= List of Wanderers F.C. FA Cup–winning players =

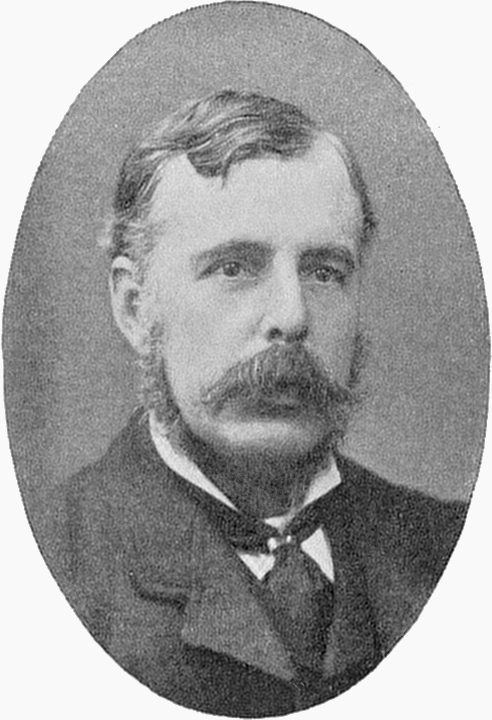
Charles W. Alcock played in the first FA Cup final. He had first proposed the creation of the tournament in 1871.

Wanderers F.C. was an English association football club based in London. Comprising mainly former pupils of the leading English public schools, the club was among the most dominant of the early years of organised football^{[a]} and won the FA Cup, the sport's first formal competition, five times between 1872 and 1878. A total of 33 players took the field for Wanderers in their cup final appearances, including several of the most prominent players of the sport's early years. The club's fortunes declined rapidly after its final FA Cup win in 1878, partly because many of its leading players opted to play instead for teams set up specifically for the former pupils of individual schools; by the mid-1880s the Wanderers club had ceased to play matches.

The club was among the 15 entrants to the first FA Cup tournament in the 1871–72 season and reached the final. A goal from Morton Betts (playing under the pseudonym "A.H. Chequer") was sufficient to give Wanderers a 1–0 victory over Royal Engineers. Also in the team was Charles W. Alcock, who, in his role as secretary of the Football Association (the FA), had first proposed the creation of a knock-out tournament for its member clubs in 1871. A year later, Wanderers received a bye straight to the final, in keeping with the original concept of the FA Cup as a "challenge tournament" in which other clubs would compete for the right to face the cup-holders in the final; this rule was abandoned after one season. In the 1873 final, Arthur Kinnaird played in the first of a record-setting nine FA Cup finals. He was on the winning team in five finals, a record which he would hold (latterly jointly) until 2010. Kinnaird (later the 11th Lord Kinnaird) was regarded as one of the pre-eminent sportsmen of his era, and later went on to serve as president of the FA for more than 30 years. William Kenyon-Slaney also played in the 1873 final; days earlier he had become the first player to score a goal for England in an international match now regarded as official.^{[b]}

Wanderers next appeared in the final in 1876, when they were held to a draw by Old Etonians, necessitating a replay, which Wanderers won. Francis Heron and his brother Hubert were both in the Wanderers team; the Etonians had two pairs of brothers in their line-up for the first match and as of the 21st century it remains the only FA Cup final to involve multiple pairs of brothers. It was the first of three consecutive cup final wins for the team; Hubert Heron, Alfred Stratford, William Lindsay, and Jarvis Kenrick played in all four matches, including the drawn game in 1876. Charles Wollaston, who had been in both of the club's first two cup-winning teams, also played in all four games and was thus the only player to appear in every one of Wanderers' cup final games and the first player to win the FA Cup five times. This feat was later matched by Kinnaird, who would go on to win the competition twice with Old Etonians in addition to his three victories with Wanderers. Kenrick scored the most goals for Wanderers in finals, with one in 1877 and two in 1878. Thomas Hughes scored two goals in the 1876 replay, the first time that any player had scored more than one goal in an FA Cup final match. A number of the Wanderers' cup-winning players, all of whom played at a time when the sport was strictly amateur and played primarily by men from wealthy and privileged backgrounds, achieved notability in other walks of life. Kenyon-Slaney became a Member of Parliament, Kinnaird, in addition to his lengthy career in football administration, was a director of Barclays Bank and Lord High Commissioner to the General Assembly of the Church of Scotland, and Albert Meysey-Thompson was a barrister and held the post of Queen's Counsel.

== Players ==
William Kenyon-Slaney played in the 1873 final for Wanderers and was also the first player to score a goal for England.

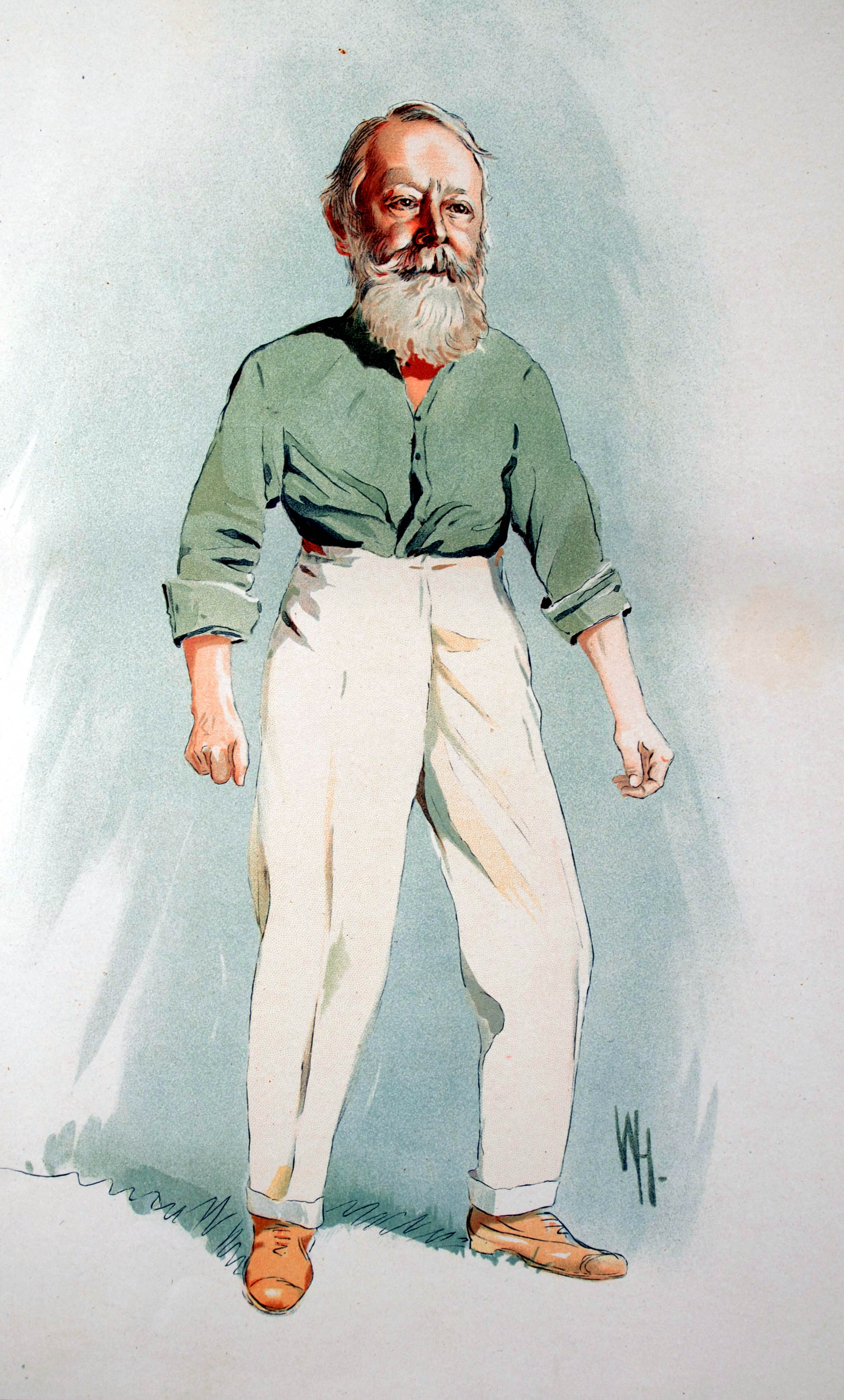
Arthur Kinnaird (later Lord Kinnaird) played in a record nine FA Cup finals, and was on the winning side five times.

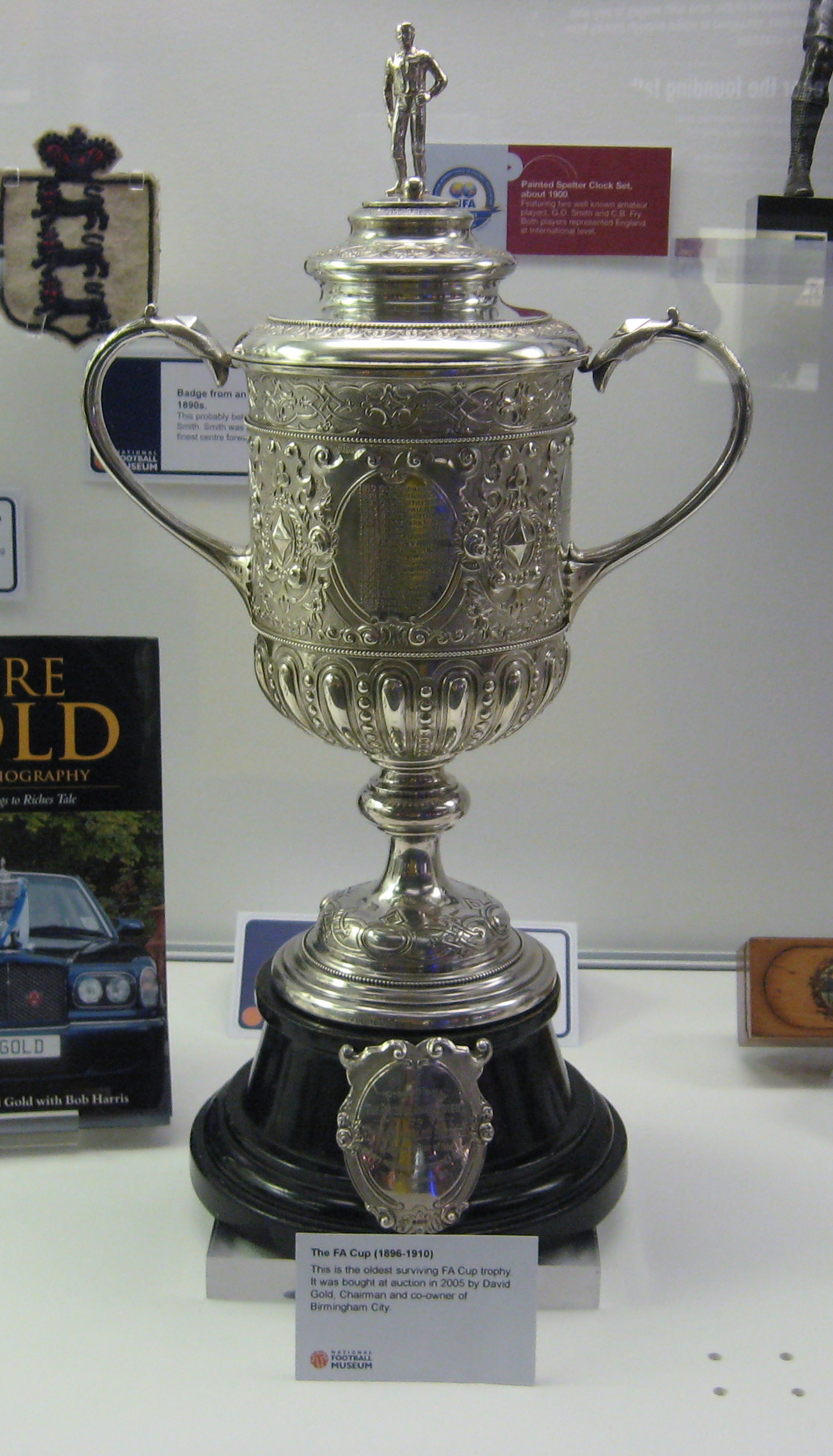
The second FA Cup trophy, identical to the original trophy won five times by Wanderers

Positions key
GK	Goalkeeper
FB	Full-back
HB	Half-back
FW	Forward

List of players
Player	Position	Apps.	Goals	Final(s)	Refs
Charles W. Alcock	FW	1	0	1872	
Morton Betts	FW	1	1	1872	
Alexander Bonsor	FW	2	0	1872, 1873	
Edward Bowen	FW/HB	2	0	1872, 1873	
William Crake	FW	1	0	1872	
Thomas Hooman	FW	1	0	1872	
Edgar Lubbock	FB	1	0	1872	
Albert Thompson	HB	1	0	1872	
Walpole Vidal	FW	1	0	1872	
Reginald Courtenay Welch	GK	2	0	1872, 1873	
Charles Wollaston	FW	6	2	1872, 1873, 1876 (both matches), 1877, 1878	
Leonard Howell	FB	1	0	1873	
William Kenyon-Slaney	FW	1	0	1873	
Robert Kingsford	FW	1	0	1873	
Arthur Kinnaird	FW/GK/HB	3	2^{[c]}	1873, 1877, 1878	
Charles Thompson	FW	1	0	1873	
Henry Stewart	FW	1	0	1873	
Julian Sturgis	FW	1	0	1873	
Francis Birley	HB	3	0	1876 (both matches), 1877	
John Hawley Edwards	FW	2	1	1876 (both matches)	
W. D. O. Greig	GK	2	0	1876 (both matches)	
Francis Heron	FW	2	0	1876 (both matches)	
Hubert Heron	FW	4	0	1876 (both matches), 1877, 1878	
Thomas Hughes	FW	3	2	1876 (both matches), 1877	
Jarvis Kenrick	FW	4	3	1876 (both matches), 1877, 1878	
William Lindsay	FB	4	1	1876 (both matches), 1877, 1878	
Frederick Maddison	HB	2	0	1876 (both matches)	
Alfred Stratford	FB	4	0	1876 (both matches), 1877, 1878	
Charles Denton	FW	2	0	1877, 1878	
Frederick Green	HB	2	0	1877, 1878	
Henry Wace	FW	2	0	1877, 1878	
James Kirkpatrick	GK	1	0	1878	
John Wylie	FW	1	0	1878	

== Footnotes ==
a. Developing out of earlier related ball games with varying, often informal, rules, the sport of association football was officially codified for the first time in 1863.
b. Kenyon-Slaney scored in what is now regarded as the second official international football match, the first in 1872 having ended 0–0. Five earlier matches had taken place between terms representing England and Scotland, but these are not now regarded as official international matches as the Scotland team was selected only from players with Scottish connections resident in and around London.
c. Kinnaird's figure of two goals includes one in the 1878 final which is credited to him in modern sources but for which contemporary newspaper reports do not definitively identify the scorer.
