= Matthew Farrer (footballer) =

English footballer and rower

Personal information
- Full name: Matthew George Farrer
- Date of birth: 12 February 1852
- Place of birth: Marylebone, London. England
- Date of death: 27 January 1928 (aged 75)
- Place of death: Berkshire, England
- Positions: Full-back; half-back

Senior career*
Years	Team	Apps	(Gls)
1875–1876	Old Etonians		
- * Club domestic league appearances and goals

Matthew George Farrer (12 February 1852 – 27 January 1928) was an English footballer and barrister, who won two FA Cup runners-up medals, and who also had great success in rowing.

== Early life ==
He was the son of Matthew Thomas Farrer, a vicar, and his wife Mary Louise.

Farrer was educated at Eton College and matriculated at Brasenose College, Oxford, in March 1870. He was most notable as a rower; he tried out for the Boat Race in 1870 and 1872, was in the Etonian eight which won the Ladies' Challenge Plate at the Henley Regatta in 1870, and was part of the Old Etonian boat which won the Grand Challenge Cup there in 1871. He finally took part in the Boat Race in 1873, and won the Oxford Pairs with his brother William the same year. He was President of Vincent's Club in 1874.

== Football career ==
Although Eton had its own forms of football, Farrer had never distinguished himself in them, although he played for the Oppidans in the 1868 Wall Game which the Collegers won by 4 shies to 0. His first appearance in an association football match of any note came in 1871, when he represented Etonians at Oxford against Oxonian Harrovians. After then, however he barely played football at all. He did not represent the university at football, and his first match for the Old Etonians - not merely first competitive match, but his first match in toto - was the 1875 FA Cup final replay, against the Royal Engineers. He seems to have been something of an emergency choice as the Etonians were without four players from the first match and Farrer was put in as full-back to allow the more experienced Wilson to play half-back. Unsurprisingly the re-jigged Etonians lost 2–0.

However, now that he had had a taste of football, Farrer seems to have taken to it, playing not only for the Old Etonians in 1875–76, but for the Gitanos side for which Etonians were also eligible. By this time he was also playing as half-back. In the 1875–76 FA Cup, he played in the Etonians' 8–0 second-round win over Maidenhead at the Kennington Oval, the quarter-final win over Clapham Rovers, and against Oxford University in the semi-final. He was however dropped for the final against the Wanderers, James Welldon taking his place as sole full-back. Welldon was unavailable for the replay, and Farrer returned to the side, but as half-back rather than sole full-back; that the more experienced, but recently recovered from illness, Edgar Lubbock was preferred at full-back to Farrer was considered one of the reasons for the Etonians' defeat.

The replay was Farrer's final recorded football match, his pupillage taking him away from the game.

== Post-football life ==
He was called to the Bar in 1878, as a member of Lincoln's Inn. In his early practice he lived at Blackmore Park Farm in Great Malvern.

He married Caroline, daughter of Robert Culling Hanbury (Member of Parliament for Middlesex until his death in 1867), on 26 January 1884. The couple had five sons and one daughter. He died in Oxford in 1928.

== Honours ==
Old Etonians

- FA Cup finalists: 1875 & 1876
