= William Lindsay (English footballer) =

English footballer and cricketer (1847–1923)

Personal information
- Full name: William Lindsay
- Date of birth: 3 August 1847
- Place of birth: Benares, British India
- Date of death: 15 February 1923 (aged 75)
- Place of death: Rochester, England
- Position: Full-back

Senior career*
Years	Team	Apps	(Gls)
- Old Wykehamists
- Wanderers
- Crystal Palace
- Civil Service
- Gitanos
- South Norwood

International career
1877	England	1	(0)
- * Club domestic league appearances and goals

William Lindsay (3 August 1847 – 15 February 1923) was an English amateur footballer who, generally playing as a full back, helped the Wanderers win the FA Cup in 1876, 1877 (when he scored the winning goal) and 1878 and made one appearance for England in 1877. He also played cricket for Surrey between 1876 and 1882.

== Career ==
=== Early life and education ===
Lindsay was born in Benares, India, the son of Major William Lindsay of the 10th Regiment. His father and most of his family were killed during the Indian Rebellion of 1857 at the Siege of Cawnpore.

In 1858 he was admitted to Winchester College as one of three boys orphaned by the Indian Mutiny and remained at the college until 1865. At school he was a keen sportsman and played cricket for the Commoners XI between 1862 and 1864, as well as for the school football team. In 1860, he won the school wide jump competition and was second in the 100 yards. In 1863, he won both the high jump and the wide jump, followed by the high jump with pole in 1864 and the sack race the following year.

=== Football career ===
Lindsay subsequently represented the Old Wykehamists before joining the Wanderers in 1875, now aged 28.

Lindsay played for Scotland in all five of the unofficial internationals against England in 1870, 1871 and 1872, which were played at Kennington Oval before the first official international match played on 30 November 1872. He qualified for Scotland as his father was born in Dundee in 1810; his grandfather had been Provost of Dundee.

His first appearance for the Wanderers was against Clapham Rovers on 2 October 1875 and he went on to make eight appearances that season, including five in the FA Cup run, where Wanderers reached the Cup Final played against Old Etonians at the Oval on 11 March 1876. The match finished 1–1 after extra time. John Hawley Edwards scored for Wanderers; Alexander Bonsor got Old Etonians' equalising goal. Wanderers won the replay 3–0, with two goals from Thomas Hughes and one by Charles Wollaston.

The following season he again turned out regularly for the Wanderers, making a total of seven appearances, including three matches in another successful FA Cup campaign, as Wanderers again reached the final to be played against Oxford University.

Three weeks prior to the Cup Final he was one of seven debutants in the England team to play Scotland at the Kennington Oval on 3 March 1877. According to Philip Gibbons, in the 1870s the England side "tended to be chosen on availability rather than skill alone". The change in the England line-up made little difference to England's performance against the Scots who won the game 3–1, with England's consolation goal coming from Alfred Lyttelton; the Scots thus inflicted England's first international defeat on home soil in the sixth appearance between the two countries. Lindsay, along with four of the international debutants, was never selected again for international honours.

In the 1877 FA Cup Final, played against Oxford University at the Oval on 24 March, Arthur Kinnaird conceded an own goal to enable Oxford University to take the lead. A few minutes from time, the Wanderers equalised when Jarvis Kenrick slotted home a goal after a pass from Hubert Heron. The game finished level after 90 minutes; in extra time, Wanderers proved too strong for their opponents when Lindsay's initial shot was headed back to him by an Oxford defender. Following in, Lindsay was able to steer the ball past the keeper for the winning goal.

In 1877–78, Lindsay appeared for Wanderers in the later stages of their FA Cup campaign, as they reached the final for the third consecutive year, and the fifth time in the first seven years of the competition. The Final against the Royal Engineers was played at the Kennington Oval on 23 March. Wanderers won 3–1, with two goals by Jarvis Kenrick and one by Arthur Kinnaird. Wanderers were thus the cup winners for the third consecutive year; as a result, the Football Association awarded the Wanderers the cup outright – the offer was declined in a "highly sporting and honourable gesture" on condition that it could never be won outright.

Lindsay continued to turn out occasionally for the Wanderers until January 1880, when he was part of the side who were defeated 3–0 by Old Etonians in what turned out to be the Wanderers final FA Cup appearance.

During his football career, he also played for Crystal Palace, Civil Service, Gitanos and South Norwood as well as playing representative football for Surrey.

=== Cricket career ===
At Winchester, he played for the school cricket eleven in 1864 and 1865.

He joined Surrey in 1876, and in his seven seasons with the county he scored 987 runs at an average of 17.31. His highest innings was 74 against Middlesex at the Oval in 1877. He also played cricket for Devon.

== Life outside sport ==
In 1867 he started work as a junior clerk in the store department of the India Office and from 1877 to 1881 was private secretary to the Under-secretary of State, and in 1882 became Senior Clerk. He was private secretary to Lord George Hamilton, Hon. Edward Stanhope, the Marquess of Lansdowne and Viscount Enfield before he retired in 1900.

He was married to Emily (who was four years older than he was), and they had a daughter, Lilias, and a son, William.

Lindsay died at his home in Rochester, Kent on 15 February 1923.

== Sporting honours ==
Wanderers

- FA Cup winners: 1876, 1877 and 1878

== See also ==
- List of England international footballers born outside England
- List of English cricket and football players
