= Farningham F.C. =

Farningham
- Full name: Farningham Football Club
- Founded: 1872
- Dissolved: 1875
- Ground: Lion Hotel, 1 mile from Farningham station
- Secretary: George Rashleigh
Home colours

Farningham F.C. was a short-lived English association football club from the village of Farningham in Kent.

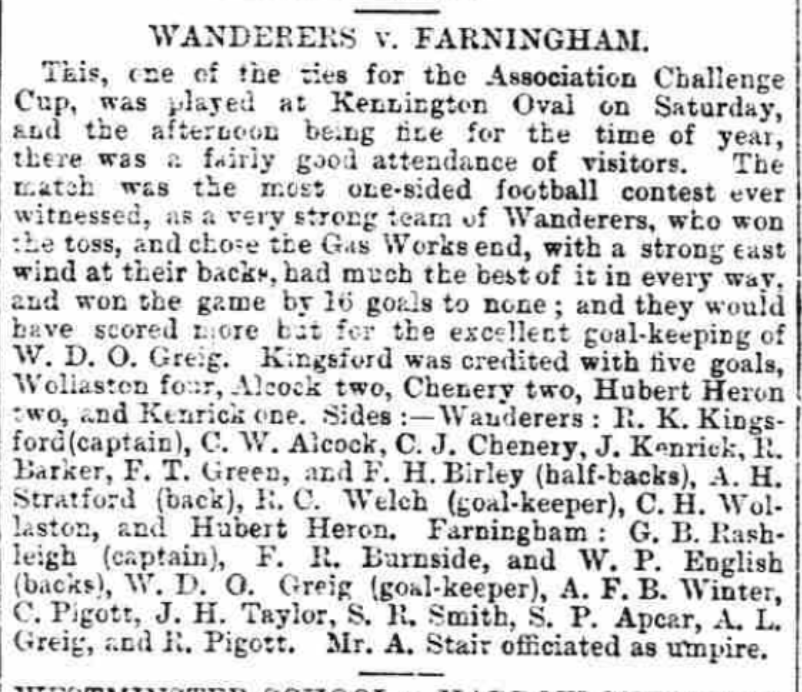
1874–75 FA Cup 1st round, Wanderers 16–0 Farningham, Morning Post, 2 November 1874

== History ==
The club played two matches in its first season (1872–73). Its first match was against the Harrow Chequers, and resulted in a win for Farningham, although that was to a large extent down to the Chequers only turning up with four players and relying on three substitutes against the ten men of Farningham. For its first match outside Kent, against the Philistines of Leytonstone, the club was able to secure the services of F. B. Maddison, who scored an equalizer right at the death.

The club entered the FA Cup on two occasions. In 1873–74 the club was drawn to play at home to the Trojans, but scratched. In the following year, the club was drawn against the Wanderers, at the Kennington Oval, and the club decided to play the match rather than scratching. The game ended 16–0 to the home side, at the time a record score. The newspapers praised the performance of Farningham's goalkeeper W.D.O.Greig, whose play was described as "very brilliant" and "excellent goalkeeping". The club appears to have been handicapped for the match by only having four of its regular players available for the tie (the others being captain and club secretary Revd. George Rashleigh, and backs Burnside and English).

Greig's reward was to be chosen for the London representative side in the match against the Sheffield Football Association representative side, albeit not as a goalkeeper. However, there are no further fixtures recorded for Farningham, which had been struggling in previous matches to put out a full side. On one occasion the club relied on a spectator to help fill out a 10-man side, and two weeks before the Wanderers game the club only turned up with eight men for a match with South Norwood.

The next season, Greig joined the Wanderers, and played in goal in their Cup Final victory.

== Colours ==
The club's colours were dark blue and white, which were probably in hoops.

== Notable players ==
- The Revd. George Rashleigh, vicar of Horton Kirby, and secretary to two Masters of the Rolls
- Frederick Maddison, England international and Cup-winner with Oxford University F.C.
