= W. D. O. Greig =

English footballer

William Dallas Ochterlony Greig (30 October 1851 – 28 January 1942) was an early association football goalkeeper who represented the Wanderers, the leading football club in England during the 1870s.

== Family and education ==
Greig was born in Dundee, the son of Alexander Ochterlony Greig (1809–1876) and Margaret Lawson (1824–1869). His father was captain of the steamship Jardine, the first steamship to travel from Britain to China in 1835. His parents married in Dundee in 1846 and also had three daughters, Margaret (born 1847 in China), Elizabeth (born 1848) and Charlotte (born 1850).

Greig attended Brighton College between 1866 and 1868, and also Farningham School.

== Football career ==
Greig, who had also played for Hertfordshire Rangers, was recruited by the Wanderers to take the place of the retiring England goalkeeper Alexander Morten. He had impressed the Wanderers with his performance during the club's 16–0 demolition of Farningham in an 1874 FA Cup first round tie, and went on to represent his new team in the same competition in 1875–76. Wanderers won the 1876 cup final, defeating Old Etonians 3–0, making Greig the only goalkeeper in FA Cup history to progress from conceding sixteen goals in a first round tie one year to winning the competition a year later.

Greig played 23 times for Wanderers, scoring twice in a rare appearance as an outfield player in 1874, and also turned out for London in two representative matches played against Sheffield.

== Later career ==
Little is known about Greig's professional life or his career after the 1876 FA Cup Final. He is recorded in the 1901 census as living at Coptfold Hall, Margaretting in Essex with his widowed sister, Elizabeth O. Jupp and her family. His profession was left blank.

Greig died in Farnham, Surrey on 28 January 1942.

== Honours ==
Wanderers

- FA Cup winners: 1876
