= Francis Heron =

English footballer

Personal information
- Full name: Charles Francis William Heron
- Date of birth: 10 September 1853
- Place of birth: Uxbridge, England
- Date of death: 23 October 1914 (aged 61)
- Place of death: Southall, England
- Position: Forward

Senior career*
Years	Team	Apps	(Gls)
- Uxbridge
- Windsor Home Park
- Swifts
- Wanderers

International career
1876	England	1	(0)
- * Club domestic league appearances and goals

Charles Francis William Heron (10 September 1853 – 23 October 1914) was an English amateur footballer who made one appearance as a forward for England and was a member of the Wanderers side that won the FA Cup in 1876.

== Playing career ==
Heron, the younger brother of Hubert Heron, was born in Uxbridge, Middlesex and attended Mill Hill School and Cranleigh School. He was a founding member of the Uxbridge Football Club on 3 February 1871. As well as playing for Uxbridge he also played for Windsor Home Park in the 1872-73 FA Cup competition and for Swifts in the 1874-75 FA Cup competition. He joined his brother at Wanderers F.C. in the 1874-75 season.

He made his solitary appearance for England in the fifth international match played at Hamilton Crescent, Partick on 4 March 1876. Heron played alongside his elder brother Hubert who was appointed team captain. According to Philip Gibbons, "England struggled throughout the game, which saw the home team run out winners by three goals to nil."

A week after the England match, he was part of the Wanderers team that met the Old Etonians in the 1876 FA Cup Final at the Kennington Oval. En route to the final, he scored two "crucial" goals against Sheffield in the third round.

In the final, the first match ended in a 1–1 draw, with the Wanderers victorious 3–0 in the replay on 18 March, with two goals from Thomas Hughes and one by Charles Wollaston. Hubert also played for Wanderers in this match; it would be another 120 years before a pair of brothers again played together in an FA Cup-final winning side and for England in the same season, when Gary and Phil Neville did so in 1996.

=== F.A. Cup history ===
F.A. Cup Season	Club	Result
1872–73 FA Cup	Windsor Home Park	Defeat to Maidenhead in the third round
1873–74 FA Cup	Uxbridge	Defeat to Royal Engineers in the second round
1874–75 FA Cup	Swifts	Defeat to Old Etonians in the first round
1875–76 FA Cup	Wanderers	F.A. Cup winning side against Old Etonians

== Later career ==
After leaving Uxbridge Frank Heron followed the same line of business as his father and brother Hubert, that of a wine merchant. He lived for twenty years in Kendal and then in Morecambe and Bath. He returned to Middlesex for the last nine years of his life, locating his business at 4 New Broadway, Southall. He was a Freeman of the City of London, being a liveryman of the Haberdashers' Company.

== Honours ==
Wanderers

- FA Cup winners: 1876
