= Walthamstow F.C. (1867) =

Defunct English football club

The Walthamstow Club
- Full name: Walthamstow Football Club
- Founded: 1867
- Dissolved: 1883?
- Ground: Palmerston Road
- Secretary: Frederick Walker
Home colours

The Walthamstow Club was an English association and rugby club based at Palmerston Road in Walthamstow.

== History ==
The club gave its foundation date as September 1867, under the secretaryship of Frederick Walker, and captaincy of Philip Rouquette. There is reference to a different Walthamstow club losing to the Forest club in 1865, and Rouquette and several of the club's players (including Rouquette, his brother Henry, H. Lloyd, A. Borwick, and E. Parry) had played for the Walthamstow Rifles club before the Walthamstow club foundation.

In 1868 the club had 40 members paying a subscription of 2s 6d per annum.

The club's first association match against another club was a 1–0 away win against the Tottenham & Edmonton club on 2 November 1867 and last recorded association match a 6–0 defeat to the Forest School in March 1876, although for its last four seasons the only association opponent the club had was the Forest School.

The club continued to play rugby into the 1880s, including fixtures against London Scottish and Oxford and Cambridge Universities in 1881.

== Colours ==
The club's original colours were red, blue and white in "broad stripes" In 1882 they changed to yellow and black.

== Notable players ==
- Philip Rouquette and A. Borwick, who were also members of the Wanderers
