= Hubert Heron =

English footballer

Personal information
- Full name: George Hubert Hugh Heron
- Date of birth: 30 January 1852
- Place of birth: Uxbridge, England
- Date of death: 5 June 1914 (aged 62)
- Place of death: Twickenham, England
- Position: Forward

Senior career*
Years	Team	Apps	(Gls)
1871-1874	Uxbridge		
- Windsor Home Park
- Swifts
1874-1878	Wanderers		
1877	Uxbridge Crescents		

International career
1873–1878	England	5	(0)
- * Club domestic league appearances and goals

George Hubert Hugh Heron (30 January 1852 – 5 June 1914) was an English footballer who made five appearances as a forward for England in the 1870s and won three FA Cup winners' medals.

== Playing career ==
Heron was born in Uxbridge, west London and attended Mill Hill School and Cranleigh School. He was a founding member of the Uxbridge Football Club on 3 February 1871 and was its captain from 2 September 1873 until joining the Wanderers in the 1874-75 season.

His first international appearance came on the left of a six-man forward line against Scotland on 8 March 1873 at the Kennington Oval, London, which resulted in a 4–2 victory for England. He was again selected for the third annual match against Scotland on 7 March 1874, when "the Scots managed a 2-1 victory to avenge the 1873 defeat".

He made his debut for Wanderers on 4 March 1874 in a mixed club friendly match against Westminster School. He was described in the 1875 "Football Annual" as "a wing player (who) is useful and at times brilliant; is fast and dribbles skilfully, used to be a little selfish in his style of play, but of late very much improved in this respect". He made ten appearances for Wanderers in 1874–75, scoring eight goals.

In 1875, he was one of several Wanderers players selected to meet Scotland at Kennington Oval on 6 March. This match ended 2-2, with England's goals coming from Heron's Wanderers team-mates, Charles Wollaston and Charles Alcock. For the next year's international match played at Hamilton Crescent, Partick on 4 March 1876 Heron was appointed captain, with his younger brother Francis playing alongside him. According to Philip Gibbons, "England struggled throughout the game, which saw the home team run out winners by three goals to nil."

A week after the England match, he was part of the Wanderers team that met the Old Etonians in the 1876 FA Cup Final at the Kennington Oval. The first match ended in a 1–1 draw, with the Wanderers victorious 3–0 in the replay on 18 March. Heron was involved in the second and third Wanderers goals, twice laying on the crosses for Thomas Hughes to score. Francis also played for Wanderers in this match; it would be another 120 years before a pair of brothers again played together in an FA Cup-final winning side and for England in the same season, when Gary and Phil Neville did so in 1996.

The following season, Wanderers were again victorious in the Cup Final, defeating Oxford University 2–1. In the semi-final against Cambridge University, Heron scored the only goal to send Wanderers to their second consecutive final and a (then) record fourth in total. This was as close as the FA Cup Final ever came to a battle between the two leading universities. In the final itself, his cross found Jarvis Kenrick who scored an equalizing goal near the end of normal time; Wanderers scored the winning goal in extra-time.

Heron was not selected for the 1877 international, but was recalled in 1878. The match, played on 2 March 1878 at Hampden Park ended in a humiliating 7–2 defeat. This brought Heron's international career to an end; all his matches had come against Scotland and comprised one victory, one draw and three defeats.

In the first round of the 1877-78 FA Cup, Heron scored four goals in a 9–1 victory over the Panthers. On 23 March 1878 he reached his (and Wanderers') third successive Cup Final. Although not scoring himself, he again put in a cross from the right for Kenrick to score his second goal of the game, with Wanderers eventually running out 3-1 victors. Wanderers thus won the Cup for the fifth (and final) time in seven years. The 1878 FA Cup final was Heron's final game for Wanderers.

During his career he also played for Windsor Home Park and Swifts as well as representing Middlesex and London.

== Later career ==
Heron served on the F.A. committee between 1873 and 1876 and earned his living as a wine merchant in Bournemouth.

== Honours ==
Wanderers

- FA Cup winners: 1876, 1877 and 1878
