= 1875–76 FA Cup =

1875–76 FA Cup (5th edition)
Tournament details
- Country: England
- Dates: 23 October 1875; 18 March 1876
- Teams: 32

Final positions
- Champions: Wanderers F.C. (3rd title)
- Runners-up: Old Etonians A.F.C.
- Semifinalists: Oxford University A.F.C.; Swifts F.C.

Tournament statistics
- Matches played: 26
- Goals scored: 111 (4.27 per match)
- Top goal scorer(s): Herbert Rawson, (Royal Engineers A.F.C.) (6 goals)

The 1875–76 Football Association Challenge Cup was the fifth edition of the annual FA Cup, the oldest national football tournament in the world. Entrants increased to 32 teams, 3 more than the previous season; 5 would never contest a match. It began 23 October 1875 and ended at the final replay on 18 March 1876.

Royal Engineers unsuccessfully defended on 29 January 1876 its 1876 title in the Third round losing to Swifts, 1–3.

The Wanderers pursuit of their 1876 Cup was interrupted in the Final on 11 March 1876 in Kennington Oval in the 1–1 draw with Old Etonians. Wanderers successfully pursued for their Cup in a Replay final on 18 March 1876 in Kennington Oval defeating the Old Etonians, 3–0. 3,500 attended.

== Format ==
This Cup was a straight knockout tournament. Semi-finals and final were played at neutral venues.

== Calendar ==
Round	Date	Fixtures					Clubs	New entries this round
Round	Date	Original	Plays	Replays	Walkovers	Byes	Clubs	New entries this round
First round	23 October - 20 November 1875	16	11	1	5	0	32 → 16	32
Second round	11 - 18 December 1875	8	6	0	2	0	16 → 8	none
Quarter-finals	29 - 31 January 1876	4	4	0	0	0	8 → 4	none
Semi-finals	19 - 26 February 1876	2	2	0	0	0	4 → 2	none
Final	11 - 18 March 1876	1	1	1	0	0	2 → 1	none

== First round ==
23 October 1875	Upton Park F.C.	1–0	Southall F.C.	West Ham Park, West Ham, London
	Unknown			Attendance: 1500

23 October 1875	Wanderers F.C.	5–0	1st Surrey Rifles F.C.	The Oval, Kennington, London
	Frederick Maddison; Jarvis Kenrick; Charles Alcock			Attendance: 3785; Referee: John Hardinge Giffard

23 October 1875	Maidenhead F.C.	2–0	Ramblers F.C.	York Road, Maidenhead
	Gould (likely); Vardy (possible)			Attendance: 1097

30 October 1875	Barnes F.C.	0–1	Reigate Priory F.C.	Barnes Green, Barnes, London
			"Charged through by the combined efforts of Pawle and Thompson"	Attendance: 800

3 November 1875	Swifts F.C.	2–0	Great Marlow F.C.	The Dolphin Cricket Ground, Slough
	Talbot; William Joll			Attendance: 1000

6 November 1875	Oxford University A.F.C.	6–0	Forest School F.C.	The Oval, Kennington, London
	John Bain; Francis Otter; Edward Parry; Albert Simpson; Unknown			Attendance: 1136

6 November 1875	105th Regiment F.C.	0–0	Crystal Palace F.C.	Regimental barracks, Aldershot
				Attendance: 500

6 November 1875	Hertfordshire Rangers F.C.	4–0	Rochester F.C.	Cassiobury Park, Watford
	Day; Gilbert; Sparks			Attendance: 700

6 November 1875	Panthers F.C.	1–0	Woodford Wells F.C.	Winchester College Ground, Winchester
	Unknown			Attendance: 500

9 November 1875	Old Etonians A.F.C.	4–1	Pilgrims F.C.	Hackney Downs, Clapton, London
	Alexander Bonsor; Alfred Lyttelton; Frederick Patton; Francis Wilson		Thomas Letchford	Attendance: 1800

10 November 1875	Royal Engineers A.F.C.	15–0	High Wycombe F.C.	Chatham Lines, Medway
	George Middlemiss; Herbert Rawson; John Blackburn; Pelham von Donop; Conyers Tower			Attendance: 2249

Cambridge University A.F.C.	w/o from	Civil Service F.C.

Clapham Rovers F.C.	w/o from	Hitchin F.C.

Leyton F.C.	w/o from	Harrow Chequers F.C.

Sheffield F.C.	w/o from	Shropshire Wanderers F.C.

South Norwood F.C.	w/o from	Clydesdale F.C.

=== Replay ===
20 November 1875	Crystal Palace F.C.	3–0	105th Regiment F.C.	The Oval, Kennington, London
	Edward Barlow; Arthur Neame; Charles Smith			Attendance: 1578

== Second round ==
11 December 1875	Old Etonians A.F.C.	8–0	Maidenhead F.C.	The Oval, Kennington, London
	Frederick Patton; Thompson (Albert or Charles); Arthur Courthope; Herbert Griffith; Unknown			Attendance: 1800

11 December 1875	Reigate Priory F.C.	0–8	Cambridge University A.F.C.	Lillie Bridge Grounds, Fulham, London
			Cole; Roffey; Sparham; Steel	Attendance: 800

11 December 1875	South Norwood F.C.	0–5	Swifts F.C.	Cricket Ground, South Norwood, London
			William Bambridge; Post; Charles Sale; Talbot; Unknown	Attendance: 800

11 December 1875	Wanderers F.C.	3–0	Crystal Palace F.C.	Lillie Bridge Grounds, Fulham, London
14:30	Charles Wollaston; Francis Heron			Attendance: 4000; Referee: R. L. Allport

18 December 1875	Clapham Rovers F.C.	12–0	Leyton F.C.	Greyhound Lane, Clapham, London
14:45	Richard Geaves; Edward Hunter; Charles Birkett; Walter Buchanan; Edgar Smith; Harry Stanley; Charles Bevington; Unknown			Attendance: 2824; Referee: Charles Wollaston (Wanderers F.C.)

18 December 1875	Oxford University A.F.C.	8–2	Hertfordshire Rangers F.C.	The Parks, Oxford
14:50	Albert Simpson; John Bain; Edward Parry; Unknown		Gilbert; Unknown	Attendance: 1500

Royal Engineers A.F.C.	w/o from	Panthers F.C.

Sheffield F.C.	w/o from	Upton Park F.C.

== Quarter-finals ==
29 January 1876	Old Etonians A.F.C.	1–0	Clapham Rovers F.C.	Meadows, Eton
15:05	Alexander Bonsor			Attendance: 1800

29 January 1876	Royal Engineers A.F.C.	1–3	Swifts F.C.	Chatham Lines, Chatham
15:00	Herbert Rawson		William Bambridge; Charles Sale; Ernest Selwyn	Attendance: 2500

29 January 1876	Wanderers F.C.	2–0	Sheffield F.C.	The Oval, Kennington, London
15:00	Thomas Hughes; Francis Birley			Attendance: 2500

31 January 1876	Cambridge University A.F.C.	0–4	Oxford University A.F.C.	The Oval, Kennington, London
15:00			Arthur Todd; William Rawson; Francis Bain; Herbert Bain	Attendance: 1100

== Semi-finals ==
19 February 1876	Oxford University A.F.C.	0–1	Old Etonians A.F.C.	The Oval, Kennington, London
			Julian Sturgis	Attendance: 1500

26 February 1876	Wanderers F.C.	2–1	Swifts F.C.	The Oval, Kennington, London
	Francis Birley; Charles Wollaston		Charles Sale	Attendance: 4000

== Final ==
11 March 1876
15:00

Wanderers F.C.	1–1	Old Etonians A.F.C.
John Edwards 35'	Report	Alexander Bonsor 50'

The Oval, Kennington, London
Attendance: from 3000 to 3500, according to sources
Referee: Walter Buchanan (Clapham Rovers F.C.)

=== Replay ===
18 March 1876
15:00

Wanderers F.C.	3–0	Old Etonians A.F.C.
Charles Wollaston 30'; Thomas Hughes 33' 55'	Report

The Oval, Kennington, London
Attendance: 3500
Referee: William Rawson (Clapham Rovers F.C.)

== See also ==
- FA Cup
- FA Cup Final
