= Thomas Bridges Hughes =

English footballer

Thomas Bridges Hughes (17 September 1851 – 10 August 1940) was an English amateur footballer who was the first player to score two goals in an FA Cup Final, with Wanderers in 1876. He subsequently had a long career as a schoolteacher.

== Education ==
Hughes attended Highgate School from 1861 to 1863 and then Winchester College between 1863 and 1870, where he excelled academically, becoming a school prefect and in 1869-70 "Prefect of Hall", effectively the head boy. He was also a keen cricketer and represented the school from 1868 to 1870. He attained a scholarship to New College, Oxford, although this took him three years to achieve.

After graduating, in 1876 he initially studied law at the Inner Temple, before embarking on his career as a teacher.

== Football career ==
His football career included appearances for Oxford University (when he played against Cambridge University in March 1874), Swifts and Old Wykehamists, but he achieved notability for his exploits with the Wanderers amateur club, who won five of the first seven FA Cup finals.

His first Wanderers match came on 29 January 1876 in a 2–0 victory over Sheffield in the FA Cup third round, with both goals coming from Francis Heron. Hughes retained his place for the rest of the season, helping Wanderers to reach their third final in the first five years of the tournament, when they met the Old Etonians at the Kennington Oval in the final on 11 March, which ended in a 1–1 draw. In the replay a week later, again at the Oval, Charles Wollaston scored Wanderers' first after a scramble in front of goal. Their next attack saw a fast run down the field by Hubert Heron, and Hughes slamming in the second goal. Heron and Hughes made another good run early in the second half and, being well supported, Hughes was able to notch another goal for the Wanderers. It was the first year of Wanderers' "hat-trick" of Final victories. Hughes thus became the first player to score more than once in an FA Cup final.

During the 1876–77 season, Hughes only made three reported appearances for Wanderers, all in the FA Cup. In the Cup Final Wanderers were again victorious, defeating Oxford University 2–1, with goals from William Lindsay and Jarvis Kenrick, with Arthur Kinnaird conceding an own goal for Oxford University.

Hughes teaching career prevented him from appearing for Wanderers over the next two seasons, but he returned in 1880–81 to make five appearances with two goals, both in the opening match of the season against Old Harrovians on 2 October 1880. By now Wanderers were in decline and Hughes played in their penultimate match against Harrow School in December 1882.

== Teaching career ==
After abandoning his initial choice of a career in the legal profession, Hughes became a school master at Repton School from April to December 1878, and then at Brighton College from January to July 1879. He then returned to London and settled at Evelyn's School in Hillingdon where he remained until at least 1907.

He died at his home in Lelant, Cornwall on 10 August 1940, aged 88.

== Honours ==
Wanderers

- FA Cup: 1876, 1877
