= Julian Sturgis =

American-born British novelist, poet and dramatist

Sturgis, in about 1880

Julian Russell Sturgis (21 October 1848 – 13 April 1904) was an American-born British novelist, poet, librettist, lyricist, and footballer.

Educated at Eton and Balliol College, Oxford, Sturgis distinguished himself in Eton's sporting activities and rowed for Balliol for three years. He then played association football as an amateur, from 1872 to 1876, and was the first foreign born person to play in, and the first to win, an FA Cup Final.

Sturgis qualified as a barrister, but he embarked on a writing career in 1874, producing novels, poetry, plays and libretti. He wrote the words for four operas, with music by Arthur Goring Thomas, Arthur Sullivan, Alexander Mackenzie and Charles Villiers Stanford, respectively. He is, perhaps, best remembered as the librettist for Sullivan's 1891 opera Ivanhoe.

== Early life and education ==
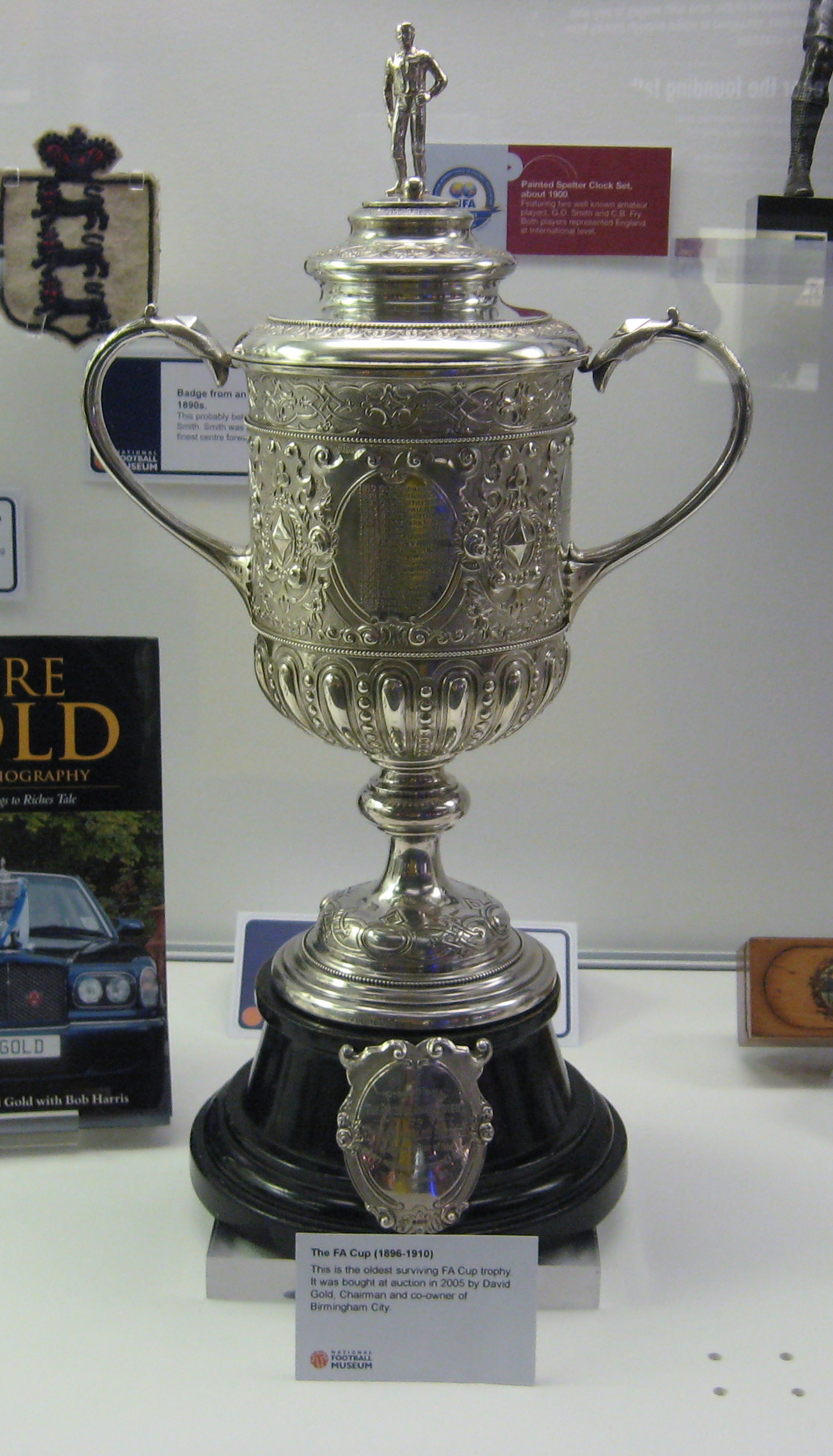
Second FA Cup, identical to original trophy won by Wanderers in the 1873 FA Cup Final

Sturgis was born in Boston, Massachusetts, the fourth son of merchant and lawyer Russell Sturgis and his third wife, Julia Overing (née Boit). His great-grandfather was another Russell Sturgis, and his older half-brother was John Hubbard Sturgis. When Julian was seven months old, the family moved to England, where Russell Sturgis joined Baring Brothers in London. (Note: Sturgis's obituary in The New York Times stated that his half brother was the art critic Russell Sturgis. However, the latter's mother, Margaret Dawes, was married to another Russel Sturgis, not Julian's father.) The writer Howard Sturgis was Julian's younger brother.

Sturgis attended Eton from 1862 to 1867, where he played an active role in the mixed Wall and Field XI games in 1867, serving as Keeper of the Field. He also edited the Eton College Journal and was chairman of Pop. On leaving Eton, he went to Balliol College, Oxford, where he rowed for three years for the college.

== Career ==
=== Law and sport ===
After graduating in 1872, Sturgis entered the legal profession, becoming a barrister of the Inner Temple in 1876. During the same four years, he distinguished himself as a footballer, playing for the amateur team Wanderers when they won the FA Cup in 1873. (Note: Sturgis joined the Wanderers in 1872, making his first appearance in a 2–0 defeat by the Royal Engineers on 30 November 1872. Wanderers automatically qualified for the 1873 FA Cup Final as the cup holders, having won the inaugural competition the previous year. Although having made only a handful of appearances for the Wanderers, Sturgis was selected as a forward for the final, played at Lillie Bridge on 29 March 1873. Wanderers defeated Oxford University 2–0, with goals from Arthur Kinnaird and Charles Wollaston.) As all the other players in this and the previous Cup Final were either English, Irish or Scottish, Sturgis was the first person born in the United States to appear in and also the first to win, an FA Cup Final. He also played for the Old Etonians, and in the FA Cup semi-final against Oxford University at The Oval on 19 February 1876, he scored the only goal for the public school old boys to take them to their second consecutive final, against the Wanderers. He played in the final at The Oval. (Note: The first match of the 1876 final, on 11 March 1876, ended in a 1–1 draw, but the Wanderers won 3–0 in the replay on 18 March, with two goals from Thomas Hughes and one by Wollaston.) Sturgis also played for the Gitanos Football Club and at county level for Middlesex.

Sturgis was granted British nationality in 1877, and he travelled extensively throughout the world in the late-1870s.

=== Writer ===
Sturgis's first published work as a professional writer was a short piece, "The Philosopher's Baby", in Blackwood's Magazine in 1874. His first novel was John-a-Dreams (1878), followed the next year by An Accomplished Gentleman, of which The Times said:

It may be described as an Idyll of Anglo-Italian life under the sunny skies of Venetia. Mr. Sturgis, who must have steeped himself in local inspiration, dwells with delicately sympathetic discrimination on his scenes as well as his characters. ... But with all its poetical refinement of tone and inspirations of cultivation and art worship there is a great deal of fun in the book in one shape or another.

Sturgis's biographer Elizabeth Lee writes that he specialised in "light comedies, mostly set at Eton or Oxford." In 1880 he published Little Comedies, described by Lee as "dialogues in dramatic form containing some of his most dazzling and characteristic writing". In 1882 two books by Sturgis came out: Comedies New and Old and Dick's Wandering. In November 1883, he married Mary Maud de la Poer Beresford. They had three sons. One, Mark, would later become assistant Under-Secretary for Ireland.

Playbill of Nadeshda, 1885

In 1885, Sturgis wrote the libretto for Arthur Goring Thomas's opera, Nadeshda, which was first performed at the Theatre Royal, Drury Lane on 16 April 1885. In a generally favourable review, the critic in The Times noted that Sturgis had taken the plot from an old Russian story recently adapted as a German novel, and commented, "Wherever or in what shape Mr. Sturgis may have found his materials he has treated them in a clever and workmanlike manner. His diction is not very refined or elevated, and his metre in rhymed lyrics or blank verse often defies the rules of prosody. But the incidents of the story are set forth simply and clearly, and more than one powerful situation is attained."

Sturgis continued to write novels during the 1880s. They were My Friends and I (1884), John Maidment (1885), Thraldom (1887), and The Comedy of a Country House (1889). Reviewing the second of these, The Manchester Guardian said, "Readers of Little Comedies know how patiently and ingeniously Mr. Sturgis can draw what may be called the minor scoundrel – the scoundrel whose scoundrelism is so successfully concealed from the world and from himself that it is only a few people who know him to be a scoundrel at all. He has made a fresh and more audacious study of this type in John Maidment, a study audacious but successful."

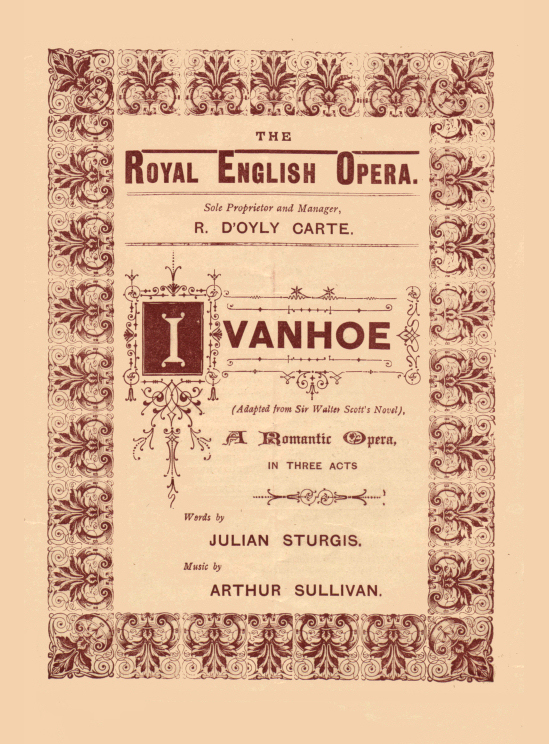
Programme for Ivanhoe, 1891

Sturgis's father died in 1887, leaving substantial legacies to his children. (Note: The Oxford Dictionary of National Biography incorrectly gives the year as 1883. Russell Sturgis's death was noted in the press in November 1887.) Sturgis received £40,000 tax-free, the equivalent of more than £20m in 2010 terms. Sturgis retained a house in London and divided his time between there and his country estate, first at Elvington, near Dover, and then at Compton, near Guildford, where he built a house, Wancote.

=== 1890s and last years ===
Throughout the 1880s, Sir Arthur Sullivan chafed at the restrictions of the comic operas for which he was famous. His friends and associates, and even the queen, encouraged him to write a serious opera. His usual collaborator, W.S. Gilbert, declined to join him in writing a full-scale romantic opera, and recommended Sturgis as "the best serious librettist of the day". The opera, Ivanhoe (1891), is an adaptation of Walter Scott's long patriotic novel of the same title. Most critics praised the libretto. Bernard Shaw was an exception, accusing Sturgis of "wanton debasement of a literary masterpiece", turning "Scott's noble dialogue" into "fustian". (Note: It is unclear how "noble" Shaw really held Scott to be: writing five years later he said, "With the single exception of Homer, there is no eminent writer, not even Sir Walter Scott, whom I can despise so entirely as I despise Shakespear.") The Times praised Sturgis's "remarkable fidelity and skill". The Observer also found his work skilful. The Manchester Guardian said that Sullivan was fortunate in his librettist, who "show[ed] himself capable of depicting ideas and events in a few words, and those words replete with rhythmical vigour and poetic beauty as well as significance of meaning." Sullivan's friend the critic Herman Klein called the libretto "a skilful and fairly dramatic adaptation of Scott's novel and a polished example of poetic lyric-writing". Although the opera was a success, initially running for an unprecedented 155 performances at Richard D'Oyly Carte's new Royal English Opera House, it passed into obscurity after the opera house failed. It was, Klein observed, "the strangest comingling of success and failure ever chronicled in the history of British lyric enterprise!"

Sturgis's operatic collaborators: clockwise from top l. Arthur Goring Thomas, Arthur Sullivan, Alexander Mackenzie, Charles Villiers Stanford

The only novel published by Sturgis in the 1890s was The Folly of Pen Harrington (1897). He also essayed a sustained piece of verse in Count Julian: a Spanish Tragedy (1893), which he followed with A Book of Song (1894). Among his poems, three were set to music by Hubert Parry, an old friend from Eton days: "Sleep" ("Beautiful up from the deeps of the solemn sea"), "Through the ivory gate" ("I had a dream last night"), and "Whence".

In 1901, Sturgis wrote the libretto for Charles Villiers Stanford's opera, Much Ado About Nothing, based on the play by Shakespeare. Sturgis's text was exceptionally faithful to Shakespeare's original. The Manchester Guardian commented, "Not even in the Falstaff of Arrigo Boito and Giuseppe Verdi have the characteristic charm, the ripe and pungent individuality of the original comedy been more sedulously preserved."

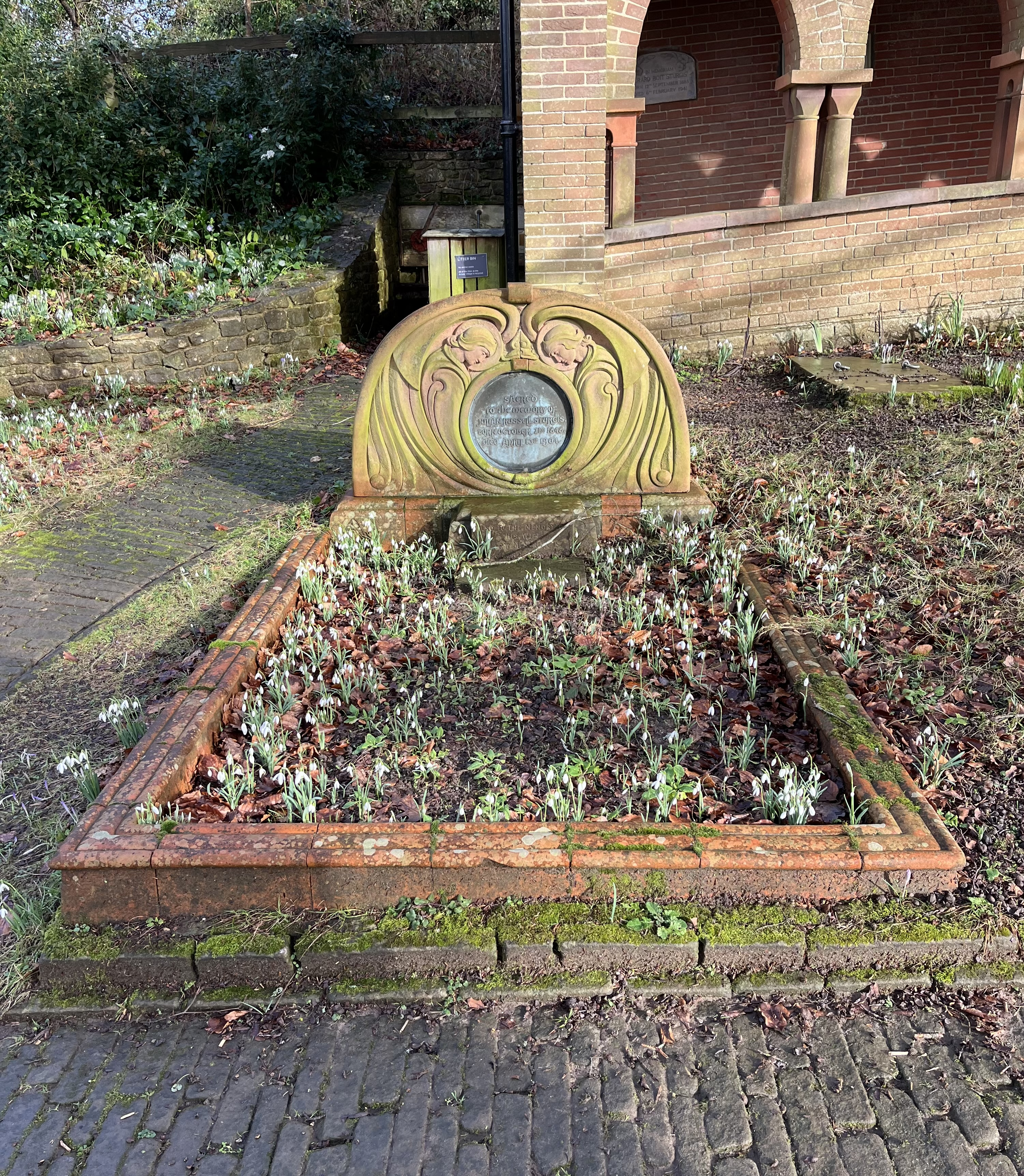
The grave of Julian Sturgis at the Watts Cemetery Chapel at Compton in Surrey in 2026

The libretto for Stanford was the last of the four that Sturgis wrote. He did not live to see the third of them staged. In 1899 he wrote a libretto for Alexander Mackenzie based on, and with the same title as, Dickens's story The Cricket on the Hearth. The text was published in 1901, and Mackenzie set it shortly afterwards. Accounts vary as to why it was not produced at the time. It may have been because the composer and the Carl Rosa Opera Company could not agree on terms, or because another adaptation by Karl Goldmark had been successfully presented too recently for another version to be viable. The piece did not reach the stage until ten years after Sturgis's death. It was given under the composer's baton by students of the Royal Academy of Music in 1914, with future stars of different operatic genres in the cast: Darrell Fancourt and Eva Turner. The critic from The Musical Times wrote of Sturgis's "skill and sympathy. ... He approached his task in the true Dickens spirit and made a good version of the story, strengthening it ... by lyrics of appropriate spirit and refinement."

== Death ==
Sturgis died at his London house in Knightsbridge on 13 April 1904, aged 55, after a long illness. He was cremated at Woking Crematorium and his ashes were buried in the cemetery at the Watts Cemetery Chapel, near his country house in Surrey. Henry James wrote to Sturgis's widow of her husband's "beautiful, noble, stainless memory, without the shadow upon him, or the shadow of a shadow, of a single grossness or meanness or ugliness – the world's dust on the nature of thousands of men. Everything that was high and charming in him comes out as one holds on to him, and when I think of my friendship of so many years with him I see it all as fairness and felicity."

== Notes and references ==
Notes

== Sources ==
- Boit, Robert Apthorp (2009). Chronicles of the Boit Family and Their Descendants and of Other Allied Families. Bibliobazaar. ISBN 978-1-113-65501-1.
- Cavallini, Rob (2005). The Wanderers F.C. - "Five times F.A. Cup winners". Dog N Duck Publications. ISBN 0-9550496-0-1.
- Jacobs, Arthur (1986). Arthur Sullivan. Oxford: Oxford University Press. ISBN 0-19-282033-8.
- Jones, Brian (2005). Lytton – Gilbert and Sullivan's Jester. London: Basingstoke Books. ISBN 1-4120-5482-6.
- Shaw, Bernard (1989). Laurence, Dan H (ed.). Shaw's Music – The Complete Music Criticism of Bernard Shaw, Volume 2. London: The Bodley Head. ISBN 0-370-31271-6.
