= Edward Fraser (rugby union) =

England international rugby union player

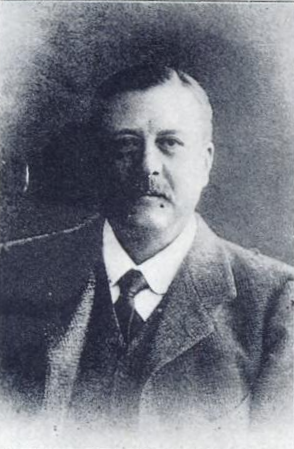
- Born: Edward Cleather Fraser; April 2, 1853 Burnside, Mauritius
- Died: October 15, 1927 (aged 74) Erpingham, Norfolk (aged 74 years 196 days)
- School: Blackheath Proprietary School
- University: Oxford University
- Occupation: Merchant

Rugby union career
- Position: Forward
Senior career
| Years | Team | Apps | (Points) |
- Oxford University RFC
| – | Blackheath | | |
International career
| Years | Team | Apps | (Points) |
| 1875 | England | 1 | |

Sir Edward Cleather Fraser KCMG (1853 - 1927) was a rugby union international who represented England in 1875 and prominent Mauritius based businessman.

== Early life and career ==
Edward Cleather Fraser was born on April 2, 1853, in Burnside, Mauritius. He was the son of James Fraser, who, alongside Hugh Hunter and George Ireland, had founded the General Merchants and factors, Hunter, Ireland & Co in Port Louis, Mauritius in 1850. On the retirement of Hugh Hunter in 1878 the firm became known as Ireland, Fraser & Co. Edward was educated at Blackheath Proprietary School and was at Merton College, Oxford from 1872 to 1875. Edward was a keen sportsman and, whilst at Oxford, as well as playing rugby union was also a keen racquets player winning a doubles trophy alongside the future FA Cup finalist Herbert Alleyne. Fraser and Alleyne were also both members of the Myrmidon Club. After graduating, Fraser returned to Mauritius in 1876 to work in his father's business and upon his father's retirement in 1878, became a partner. In May 1882, he married Mary Josephine Howie in Mauritius.

In 1902, Fraser became a Member of the Council of the Government of Mauritius and in 1912 was appointed a Companion of the Order of St Michael and St George. He was also the island's consul for Sweden, a director the Bank of Mauritius, a member of the Chamber of Commerce, a member of the Railway Board and he became President of the Meteorological Society.

Edward and Mary had three children all born in London: Elsie Georgina Fraser (born 1883); Marjory Harriet Fraser (born 1886); and a son, James Howie Fraser (born 1888). Mary, Edward's wife, died in 1901 at Saxingham Hall, Norwich, Norfolk with all three children still in their teens. James was educated at Rugby School and after a short time in Canada returned to serve with the Gordon Highlanders in World War One. He was killed in action on 30 October 1914, at Ypres, Western Front October 1914 and was posthumously Mentioned in Dispatches.

In 1923, Edward Cleather Fraser was promoted to knighthood within the order of St Michael and St George. He died on 15 October 1927 in Norfolk.

== Rugby union career ==
Fraser played rugby at Blackheath Proprietary School, a school that was both a founder of the Football Association and whose old boys club Blackheath Football Club was a founder of the Rugby Football Union. He played for Merton College in 1872 and went on to play for Oxford University in 1873 to 1875. He played in the second ever Varsity Match in 1873 and was also a member of the side in 1875 which was the first to take place with the reduced squad of fifteen players (from twenty previously). After representing the South of England in the North v South International Trial at The Oval he was selected to play for England in their first ever match against Ireland at The Oval on February 19, 1875. Despite Fraser missing a place kick, England won by 2 goals and a try to nil Before returning to Mauritius, Fraser played for Blackheath Football Club.
