= 1875–76 in English football =

Football in England
- Season: 1875–76

Men's football
- FA Cup: Wanderers

The 1875–76 season was the fifth season of competitive football in England. The only international match was the fifth match between England and Scotland.

== International ==
Date	Venue	Opponents	Score	Scotland scorers
4 March 1876	Hamilton Crescent, Glasgow (A)	Scotland	0–3	William Muir MacKinnon (8), Henry McNeil(12), Thomas Highet

According to Philip Gibbons, "the England side tended to be chosen on availability rather than skill alone." England struggled throughout the game, which saw the home team run out winners by three goals to nil.

In May 2008, a photograph of the 1876 England team was discovered in the archives of the Derby City Council Local Studies Library. Edgar Field had sent the photograph to the Derbyshire Football Express, and the picture was used in an article published on the 50th anniversary of the match. This picture came to light in May and is believed to be the earliest known picture of an England football team.

== Honours ==
Competition	Winner
FA Cup	Wanderers (3*)

Notes = Number in parentheses is the times that club has won that honour. * indicates new record for competition
