= John Forster Alcock =

English football administrator (1841–1910)

Personal information
- Full name: John Forster Alcock
- Date of birth: 14 April 1841
- Place of birth: Sunderland, County Durham, England
- Date of death: 13 March 1910 (aged 68)
- Place of death: Berkhamsted, Hertfordshire, England
- Position: Forward

Senior career*
Years	Team	Apps	(Gls)
1862–1876	Wanderers		
- Harrow Pilgrims
- * Club domestic league appearances and goals

John Forster Alcock (14 April 1841 – 13 March 1910) was an influential English sportsman and football organiser. He was founder of Football Association and FA committee member from 1863 to 1866.

== Biography ==
John Forster Alcock was born in Sunderland in 1841 to Charles Alcock (1807–1881) – a ship-owner and ship-broker – and Elizabeth Forster (1825–1891). He was the eldest child of 9 and the family lived on Norfolk Street (otherwise known as Sunniside), Sunderland and on the same street lived an uncle who headed the Alcock family's upholstery business. The Alcock family relocated prior to the 1861 census to the London area and both John Forster Alcock and Charles William Alcock (his younger brother) attended Harrow School.

Less is known of John Forster Alcock than his brother Charles, but he was a ship-owner and ship-broker who represented the Forest Club at the meetings that led to the foundation of the FA in 1863. He served on the committee of the FA until 1866 when he was replaced by Charles himself.

John Forster Alcock died aged 68 in 1910.

== Family ==
John Forster Alcock married Catherine Ruth Rouse (1848–1891) in 1867 and they divorced in 1874. He then married Augusta Lackland White (1867–1956) in Hampstead in 1886 and they went on to have three children:

- Frank Alcock (1887–1917 Rhodesia Rifles attached Kings African Rifles<CWGC>),
- Augusta Theodora Alcock (1888–unknown),
- John Forster Alcock (1896–1977).
