= Frederick Green (footballer) =

English footballer

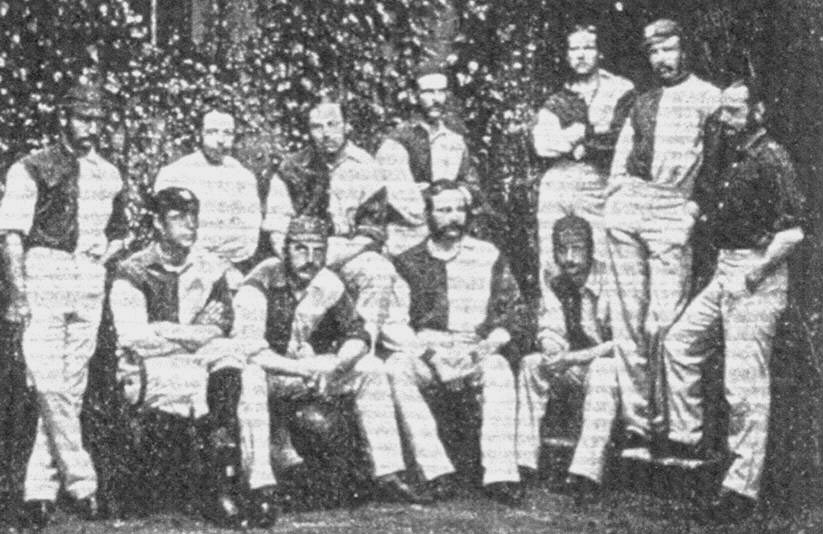
- Oxford University's FA Cup-winning side of 1874 (Green standing in back row, second from left)

Personal information
- Full name: Frederick Thomas Green
- Date of birth: 21 June 1851
- Place of birth: Wrexham, Wales
- Date of death: 6 July 1928 (aged 77)
- Place of death: Church Stretton, England
- Position: Half-back

Senior career*
Years	Team	Apps	(Gls)
- Oxford University
- Wanderers

International career
1876	England	1	(0)
- * Club domestic league appearances and goals

Frederick Thomas Green (21 June 1851 – 6 July 1928) was a footballer who won the FA Cup with Oxford University in 1874 and with Wanderers in 1877 and 1878. Born in Wales, he also made one appearance for England in 1876 against Scotland. He was described by Charles William Alcock as "a reliable half-back, being a sure kick and never irresolute".

== Life ==
Green was born in the Welsh town of Wrexham, the son of a clergyman who moved to Shropshire as Rector of Lydham. He was educated at Winchester College, in whose cricket XI he played in 1869 as well as at football, and at New College, Oxford, where he graduated as BA in 1874. He began as a barrister by profession, being called to the Bar at the Inner Temple in 1877, before becoming HM Inspector of Schools in 1880, moving up to the Education Office in 1890. He died at Church Stretton, Shropshire.

== See also ==
- List of England international footballers born outside England
