= Francis Wilson (footballer) =

English footballer and rower

Personal information
- Full name: Francis Heathcote Wilson
- Date of birth: 9 April 1848
- Place of birth: Ampfield, Hampshire
- Date of death: 11 September 1886 (aged 38)
- Place of death: Chelsea, London
- Position: Utility player (Note: Wilson was a utility player, though most often played as a full-back.)

Senior career*
Years	Team	Apps	(Gls)
1869–1972	Wanderers		
1871–1976	Gitanos		
1874–1976	Old Etonians		
- * Club domestic league appearances and goals

Francis Heathcote Wilson (9 April 1848 – 11 September 1886) was an association footballer and barrister who played in the 1875 and 1876 FA Cup finals.

== Education ==
Wilson was the son of Robert Wilson, the vicar of Ampfield, and given the middle name Heathcote in honour of Sir William Heathcote, who donated the vicarage to the church.

Wilson went up to Eton in 1860 and left in 1866. On leaving, he matriculated at University College, Oxford and took his Bachelor of Arts in 1871.

== Football career ==
The first known association football match in which Wilson played was for a Wanderers XI against a XII from the Oxford Amalgamation club (the combined members of the athletics societies at the University of Oxford) at the Parks in November 1869.

His first "regular" season was 1871–72, where he played for Wanderers and Gitanos. He did not feature in the 1871–72 FA Cup, and, as the Wanderers were exempt until the final in the 1872–73 FA Cup, and Gitanos did not enter, he did not play in that season either. A. C. Thompson occupied his usual position at half-back, but Thompson was unavailable for the 1873 FA Cup final, and Wilson, who had played for Gitanos against Wanderers two weeks before the final, was also unavailable. Leonard Howell therefore made his debut in their place.

Wilson therefore made his competitive debut in the 1873–74 FA Cup, for an 8-man Gitanos - reduced to 7 during the game due to injury - in its defeat to Uxbridge in the first round. He spent the season playing for Gitanos and scored goals - rare for backs - in wins over the Civil Service in December 1873 and Harrow Chequers in February 1874, both at the Kennington Oval.

The Old Etonians entered the FA Cup for the first time in 1874–75, and, with the Etonians only rarely playing outside the Cup, Wilson played six times for Gitanos in the "regular" season, but for the Light Blues in all of their Cup matches. Wilson played in the initial Cup final match against the Royal Engineers as full-back, but the Etonians had to make four changes for the replay, and, in order to accommodate substitute players, Wilson was moved up to half-back. The unchanged Sappers duly won 2–0.

He scored his only Cup goal for the Etonians in the first round win over Pilgrims in the 1875–76 FA Cup, shooting home after the ball came out of a scrimmage; by now he was playing mainly as a forward, and he completed the full set of positions by playing as goalkeeper in the third round win against the Clapham Rovers, keeping a clean sheet. However, he did not play in the semi-final against Oxford University or the original 1876 FA Cup final against the Wanderers, but appeared in the final replay, replacing Quintin Hogg in goal; the Wanderers won 3–0.

However, his football was greatly reduced in the season; his only match outside the competition was for Gitanos against the Royal Engineers at the Prince's Ground in Chelsea in February 1876, and the Cup final defeat seems to have been his final match.

== Legal career ==
He was called to the Bar in 1873 and worked on the Western circuit. He lived at Belgrave Square in London and practised out of chambers at 1 Paper Buildings.

== Personal life ==
Wilson was a philatelist. On 19 July 1877, he married Alice Clara Georgina Colt of Gartsherrie, near Coatbridge, in her home town. In February 1886, Wilson suffered a serious injury after falling on ice, and was admitted to the Munster House Asylum in Fulham Road, Middlesex, where he died of his injuries on 11 September.
