= Herbert Alleyne =

English footballer (1855–1884)

Personal information
- Full name: Herbert Percy Alleyne
- Date of birth: 5 March 1855
- Place of birth: Clifton, Bristol, England
- Date of death: 25 November 1884 (aged 29)
- Place of death: Matlock, Derbyshire, England

Senior career*
Years	Team	Apps	(Gls)
1875–1876	Old Etonians		
- * Club domestic league appearances and goals

Herbert Percy Alleyne (or Allene) (5 March 1855 – 25 November 1884) was an English footballer who played for English club Old Etonians.

== Family and education ==
Born in Clifton, Bristol, he was the youngest of eight children born to Charles Thomas Alleyne and Margaret Frances Alleyne (née Bruce). His father had been born in and retained strong connections with Barbados. His mother's family owned the Duffryn Estate in Glamorganshire and his maternal uncle was Henry Bruce, 1st Baron Aberdare.

Alleyne was educated at Eton College and Merton College, Oxford where he read Greats. He served as the Secretary of the Myrmidon Club before becoming its President in his final year at university. His close friend, rackets partner and future England rugby union international Edward Fraser was a fellow Myrmidon Club member.

H. P. Alleyne's sister was Leonora Blanche Alleyne who met and married the Merton Fellow Andrew Lang whilst her brother was at the college.

== Sporting career ==
Alleyne played for his school's First XI cricket and football teams. During the 1875–76 season, whilst a first year undergraduate at Oxford, he played for the Old Etonians F.C. which reached the final of the F.A. Cup.

== Later life and death ==
Alleyne graduated with a fourth-class honours degree in 1877 and was called to the bar at the Inner Temple the following year. He married Amy Constance Bright (1858–1933) in 1880 and he and his wife had one daughter, Stella Margaret Alleyne (born 1883) to whom the famous Green Fairy Book (1892), which was written by her aunt and uncle, was dedicated. Alleyne died in November 1884 at Derby Hall in Matlock Bridge, Derbyshire at the age of 29.

== Sports honours ==
Old Etonians

- F.A. Cup finalist: 1876
