= Walter Buchanan (footballer) =

English footballer

Personal information
- Full name: Walter Scott Buchanan
- Date of birth: 1 June 1855
- Place of birth: Hornsey, England
- Date of death: 11 November 1926 (aged 71)
- Place of death: Hammersmith, London, England
- Position: Forward

Senior career*
Years	Team	Apps	(Gls)
- Clapham Rovers

International career
1876	England	1	(0)
- * Club domestic league appearances and goals

Walter Scott Buchanan (1 June 1855 – 11 November 1926) was an English international footballer, who played as a forward.

== Career ==
Born in Hornsey and educated at Cranleigh School, Buchanan played for Clapham Rovers, and earned one cap for England in 1876. Buchanan was also the referee for the 1876 FA Cup final, albeit not for the replay.
