= Reginald Courtenay Welch =

English footballer

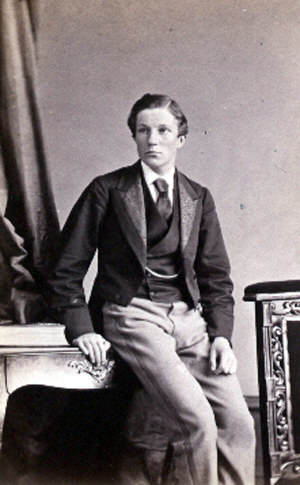
- Reginald Courtenay Welch at Harrow, c. 1868

Personal information
- Full name: Reginald Courtenay Welch
- Date of birth: 17 October 1851
- Place of birth: Kensington, England
- Date of death: 4 June 1939 (aged 87)
- Place of death: Farnham, England
- Positions: Goalkeeper; defender

Senior career*
Years	Team	Apps	(Gls)
- Old Harrovians
- Harrow Chequers
1869–1878	The Wanderers	48	(0)

International career
1872–1874	England	2	(0)
- * Club domestic league appearances and goals

Reginald Courtenay Welch (17 October 1851 – 4 June 1939) was an English footballer, a key figure in the early years of the sport. He played for the Wanderers in the FA Cup Finals of 1872 and 1873, and also played for England in the first ever international match. During his career he appeared both in goal and as a defender.

== Biography ==
Welch was born in Kensington, London on 17 October 1851 and attended Harrow School. He was the son of John Welch, a barrister of the Inner Temple. Following his career in football, Welch was an Army tutor between 1883 and 1895, going on to become principal of the Army College at Farnham, Surrey in 1895. He died at the College on 4 June 1939, aged 87, after more than 44 years as its principal. His funeral was held at St John's Church in nearby Hale and he was interred at the Green Lane Cemetery in Farnham.

== Football career ==
While at Harrow, he represented the school at association football (colloquially known as "soccer") and went on to play for Old Harrovians before joining Harrow Chequers. As an amateur he also played for The Wanderers, with whom he played as goalkeeper in the final of the inaugural FA Cup tournament. The match took place on 16 March 1872 at the Kennington Oval, London, England, with the Wanderers running out as 1–0 victors over a team from the Royal Engineers.

On 30 November 1872 he was part of the England team that played out a 0–0 draw in the first official international match against Scotland. In this match he played as half-back in a 1–1–8 or 1–2–7 formation. He is the only player to have represented Harrow Chequers F.C. whilst on England duty. His record of having played in both the first FA Cup Final and the first international match is unique.

In the next year, The Wanderers reached their second consecutive final and Welch was again on the winning side, this time playing in defence as The Wanderers beat Oxford University 2–0 at Lillie Bridge.

On 7 March 1874, he made his second (and last) England appearance, now in goal, but this time he was on the losing side as England went down 2–1 to Scotland.

He was also a member of The F.A. committee between 1873 and 1875, and again from 1879 to 1890. He was the last survivor of the England team from the inaugural international match, although he was outlived by Scotland's Billy MacKinnon.

== Cricket career ==
Welch also represented Harrow School at cricket, playing five matches during the 1871 season. A lower-order batsman, his highest score for the school was 12 in the drawn match against the Lords and Commons Cricket Club. His best bowling figures of 4–17 (4 wickets for 17 runs) came in the game against the Marylebone Cricket Club on 3 June 1871, in which he took the wickets of both Middlesex batsman Edmund Sutton and England Test player Alfred Shaw. Welch was then selected to play for the Lyric Club in a match against Marylebone in 1891 and five years later, during his time as principal of the Army College in Farnham, he played in matches against the 3rd The King's Own Hussars and the 2nd Battalion Rifle Brigade.

== Honours ==
The Wanderers

- FA Cup winners: 1872, 1873

England

- 2 Caps
