= Francis Birley =

English footballer (1850–1910)

Personal information
- Full name: Francis Hornby Birley
- Date of birth: 14 March 1850
- Place of birth: Chorlton-on-Medlock, England
- Date of death: 1 August 1910 (aged 60)
- Place of death: Lingfield, England
- Position: Full-back

Senior career*
Years	Team	Apps	(Gls)
1872–1874	Oxford University		
1873–1877	Wanderers	32	(1)
- Old Wykehamists

International career
1874–1875	England	2	(0)
- * Club domestic league appearances and goals

Francis Hornby Birley (14 March 1850 – 1 August 1910) was an English footballer who played as a half back. He won the FA Cup three times in the 1870s and made two appearances for England in 1874 and 1875.

== Career ==
=== Winchester College ===
Birley was born in Chorlton-on-Medlock, Manchester, the son of Thomas Hornby Birley J.P. (1815–1885) and Anne Leatham (1820–1866). His uncle was Hugh Birley, who became Conservative Party Member of Parliament for Manchester from 1868 to 1883.

At the age of 13, Birley started at Winchester College where he remained until 1868. He was an all round sportsman who played for the school at both cricket and football. As a cricketer, in 1867 he took 7–73 as the college beat Eton College, and in 1868 as captain he took 4–41 and 2–25. He was also a keen athlete and was the school champion at the pole vault and high jump.

=== Oxford University ===
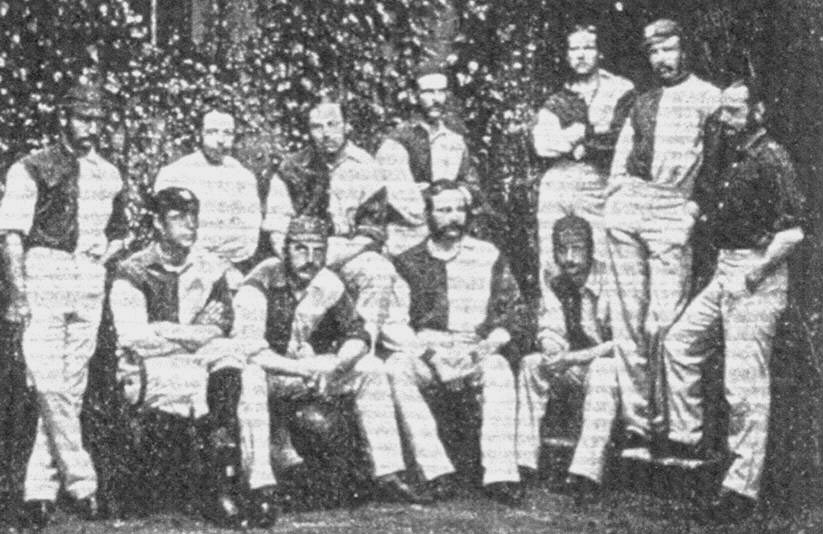
Oxford University's F.A. Cup winning side of 1874 (Birley standing at back, second from right).

In 1868, he went up to University College, Oxford to study law. He was one of the first to study Law separately at Oxford (it had previously been taught as a joint honours degree with modern history). He was not a great academic, achieving only a third class Bachelor of Arts degree in 1872, although he was more successful as a sportsman. In his time at Oxford he threw the hammer against Cambridge University in 1872 and represented the university at football. As a cricketer, although he played in the fresher's match he did not get a game for the university, although he did win a University College cup in 1871 for throwing the cricket ball with a distance of 107 yds 2 ft 1 inch.

In 1873 he was part of the Oxford University football team that reached the second final of the FA Cup, where they were beaten 2–0 by the holders, the Wanderers. The following year, he played for Oxford University in the first ever varsity football match against Cambridge University, finishing on the winning side in a 1–0 victory.

In 1873–74, Oxford University again reached the final, and this time were victorious, defeating the Royal Engineers 2–0. The match was played at Kennington Oval on 22 March 1874, Birley's 22nd birthday.

Birley's first England cap came against Scotland on 7 March 1874, when "the Scots managed a 2–1 victory to avenge their 1873 defeat".

=== Wanderers ===
By now, Birley had joined the Wanderers side, making his first appearance for them on 21 October 1873.

In 1875 he was one of several Wanderers players selected to meet Scotland at Kennington Oval on 6 March. This match ended 2–2, with England's goals coming from Birley's Wanderers teammates, Charles Wollaston and Charles Alcock.

In 1875–76, he was a member of the Wanderers team that reached the FA Cup Final for the third time in its five-year history, scoring in the semi-final against Swifts. This was his only goal for the Wanderers. In the final, Wanderers met the Old Etonians at the Kennington Oval; Birley was now the captain of the team. The first match ended in a 1–1 draw, with the Wanderers victorious 3–0 in the replay on 18 March.

The following season, Wanderers were again victorious in the Cup Final, defeating Oxford University 2–1, with Birley again the team captain. He made a total of 32 appearances for the Wanderers between 1873 and 1877; his last game was the 1877 FA Cup final.

He also played representative football for London and Middlesex.

=== Cricket career ===
Birley was described as "a moderate right-hand batsman and a useful slow right-arm bowler, an excellent field. He was said to possess excellent judgement as a captain whilst at Winchester".

Although he played in the fresher's match he did not get a game for Oxford University. He did however play for Lancashire, making his first appearance in a first-class match against Hampshire on 21 July 1870 when he took three wickets, helping Lancashire to win by ten wickets. He played twice more for Lancashire in the summer of 1870, and once in 1872.

He also made one appearance for Surrey in 1879. His first-class career took in five matches and eight innings in which he scored 65 runs, whilst he took four wickets as a bowler.

Most of his cricket was played for Cheshire. In 1868 he played his first match for Cheshire, and between then and 1873 he played in nine matches and scored 316 runs in his fourteen innings, with five not outs, achieving an average of 35.11 with a top score of 106 not out.

=== Later career ===
After leaving university he became a barrister in the Inner Temple in 1876. He later worked on the Northern Circuit and became a Justice of the Peace in Surrey.

== Family life ==
On 1 August 1876, he married Margaret Kenrick (daughter of the Rev Jarvis Kenrick, vicar of Caterham, Surrey) in Claridges, Lingfield, Surrey. His wife's brother was fellow Wanderers player, Jarvis Kenrick. He had seven children, two of whom died as infants. His two sons who survived into adulthood, James and George, both served with distinction during the First World War. At the time of the 1881 Census he was living at Hart Hill Mansion, Pendleton in Salford, with his widower father, two sisters and his wife and daughter, Margaret.

In the 1901 census, he was living at Claridges, Lingfield, Surrey. In 1910, Birley died at Dormansland, Surrey, aged 60.

His sister, Caroline was a renowned geologist. He was well known as an ornithologist.

== Sporting honours ==
Oxford University

- FA Cup winner: 1874
- FA Cup finalist: 1873

Wanderers

- FA Cup winners: 1876 and 1877
