= Alfred Stratford =

English cricketer

Personal information
- Born: 5 September 1853; Kensington, London, England
- Died: 2 May 1914 (aged 60); Newark, New Jersey, USA
- Batting: Right-handed
- Bowling: Right-arm slow
- Role: Bowler

Domestic team information
- Years: Team
- 1877–1880: Middlesex
- 1878–1880: MCC

Career statistics
Competition	First-class
Matches	34
Runs scored	577
Batting average	12.27
100s/50s	0/1
Top score	55*
Balls bowled	3,219
Wickets	83
Bowling average	16.46
5 wickets in innings	5
10 wickets in match	2
Best bowling	6/41
Catches/stumpings	10/–
- Source: CricketArchive, 8 October 2022

Alfred Hugh Stratford (5 September 1853 – 2 May 1914) was an English sportsman who played first-class cricket for Middlesex and represented the England national football team.

Stratford was at Middlesex from 1877 to 1880, during which time he also played first-class cricket with the Marylebone Cricket Club. A Malvern College graduate, he was a slow right-arm bowler and capable lower order batsman. His best performance came in 1878 when he took 12 wickets for Middlesex against Surrey at Kennington Oval. He collected 6 for 41 in the first innings and 6 for 113 in the second, dismissing England Test opener Harry Jupp in both.

At football, as a defender, Stratford appeared in his only international in a 2–1 loss to Scotland in 1874. He was a member of three FA Cup winning teams, all with the Wanderers and in successive years from 1876 to 1878.

After moving to America, Stratford continued playing cricket, with Winnipeg, Pittsburgh, New York and Newark.

In 1884, four years since his last first-class appearance, Stratford played beside his brother Frederick in a first-class match for the United States of America against the Gentlemen of Philadelphia.
