= 1876 FA Cup final =

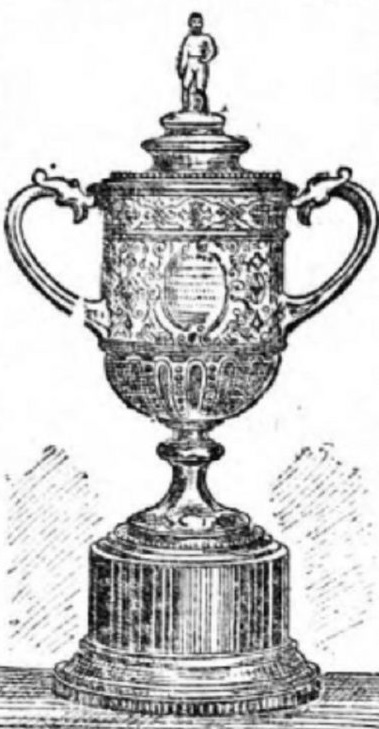
- An illustration of the FA Cup trophy awarded in 1876
- Event: 1875–76 FA Cup
| Wanderers | Old Etonians |

Final
| Wanderers | Old Etonians |
| 1 | 1 |
- Date: 11 March 1876
- Venue: Kennington Oval, London
- Referee: W. S. Buchanan (Clapham Rovers)
- Attendance: 3,500

Replay
| Wanderers | Old Etonians |
| 3 | 0 |
- Date: 18 March 1876
- Venue: Kennington Oval, London
- Referee: William Rawson (Oxford University)
- Attendance: 3,500

The 1876 FA Cup final was an association football match between Wanderers and Old Etonians on 11 March 1876 at Kennington Oval in London. It was the fifth final of the world's oldest football competition, the Football Association Challenge Cup (known in the modern era as the FA Cup). The Wanderers had won the Cup on two previous occasions. The Etonians were playing in their second consecutive final, having lost in the 1875 match after a replay against Royal Engineers. In 1876, both finalists had conceded only one goal in the four rounds of the competition prior to the final. In the semi-finals, the Wanderers defeated the Swifts and the Etonians beat the 1874 Cup winners, Oxford University.

The match ended in a 1–1 draw, the second consecutive FA Cup final to finish level and require a replay. John Hawley Edwards scored for the Wanderers, but the Etonians equalised with a goal credited in modern publications to Alexander Bonsor, although contemporary newspaper reports do not definitively identify him as the scorer. A week later, the teams met again at the same venue. The Etonians were forced to make several changes to their line-up due to players being unavailable, and the revised team lost 3–0. Charles Wollaston and Thomas Hughes scored a goal apiece in a five-minute spell before half-time, and Hughes added the third early in the second half.

== Background ==
The Football Association Challenge Cup (commonly known in the modern era as the FA Cup) was the first formal competition created for the sport of association football. The creation of the tournament had been proposed in 1871 by Charles W. Alcock, the secretary of the Football Association (the FA), who wrote that "it is desirable that a Challenge Cup should be established in connection with the Association, for which all clubs belonging to the Association should be invited to compete". His inspiration had been a similar competition between houses during his time as a pupil at Harrow School.

The first FA Cup competition took place during the 1871–72 season and 15 clubs entered. The Wanderers won the final, defeating Royal Engineers, and Alcock himself was the winning captain. The members of the Wanderers club were wealthy gentlemen who had attended some of the leading English public schools, including Harrow and Eton College. Old Etonians, the team specifically for former pupils of Eton, first entered the FA Cup in the 1873–74 season but withdrew without playing a match. The following season, they reached the final but were defeated by the Royal Engineers in a replay after the initial match finished in a 1–1 draw. The Wanderers followed their victory in 1872 by retaining the trophy in 1873 but had not progressed beyond the quarter-finals in the subsequent two seasons.

== Route to the final ==
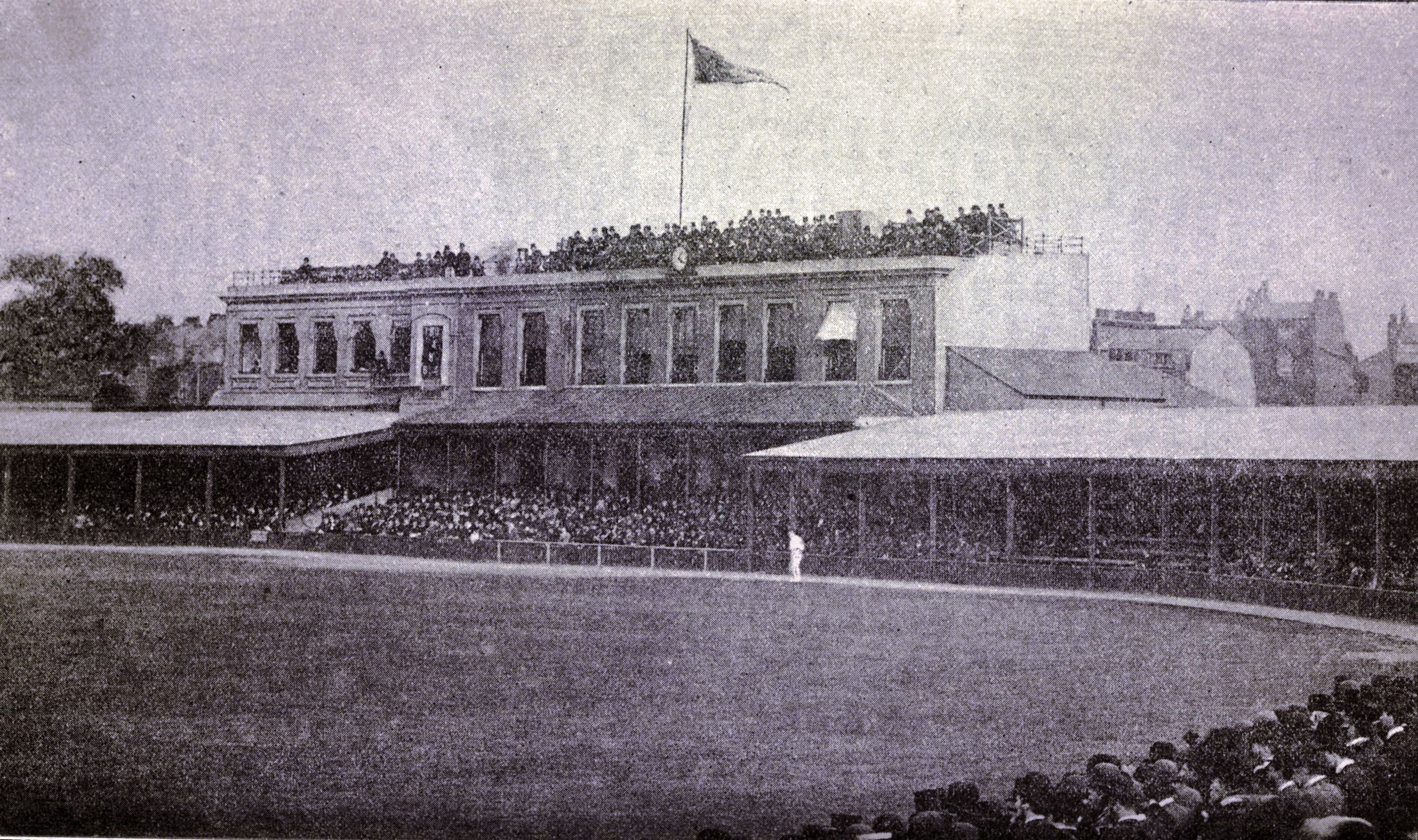
Kennington Oval (pictured in 1891) was the venue for the semi-final and final matches.

The 1875–76 FA Cup had 32 entrants, all joining the competition at the first round stage. In the random draw for the first round, the Wanderers and Old Etonians were both allocated matches at home. The Wanderers defeated the 1st Surrey Rifles team, representing the army regiment of the same name, 5–0, and the Etonians overcame Pilgrims 4–1. In the second round, both teams played at London's Kennington Oval on the same day, 11 December.

In the first of the two games, the Etonians took a 1–0 lead in the first half against Maidenhead and scored seven more goals in the second half to win 8–0. Immediately afterwards, the Wanderers defeated Crystal Palace^{[a]} 3–0. At the quarter-final stage, the Wanderers took on Sheffield, the only team left in the competition from the north of England, and won 2–0, and the Etonians gained a 1–0 victory over Clapham Rovers. Both semi-final matches took place at Kennington Oval. The Etonians beat the 1874 FA Cup winners Oxford University 1–0 in the first semi-final on 19 February, and a week later Wanderers clinched their place in the final, defeating the Slough-based club Swifts 2–1.

== Match ==
=== Summary ===
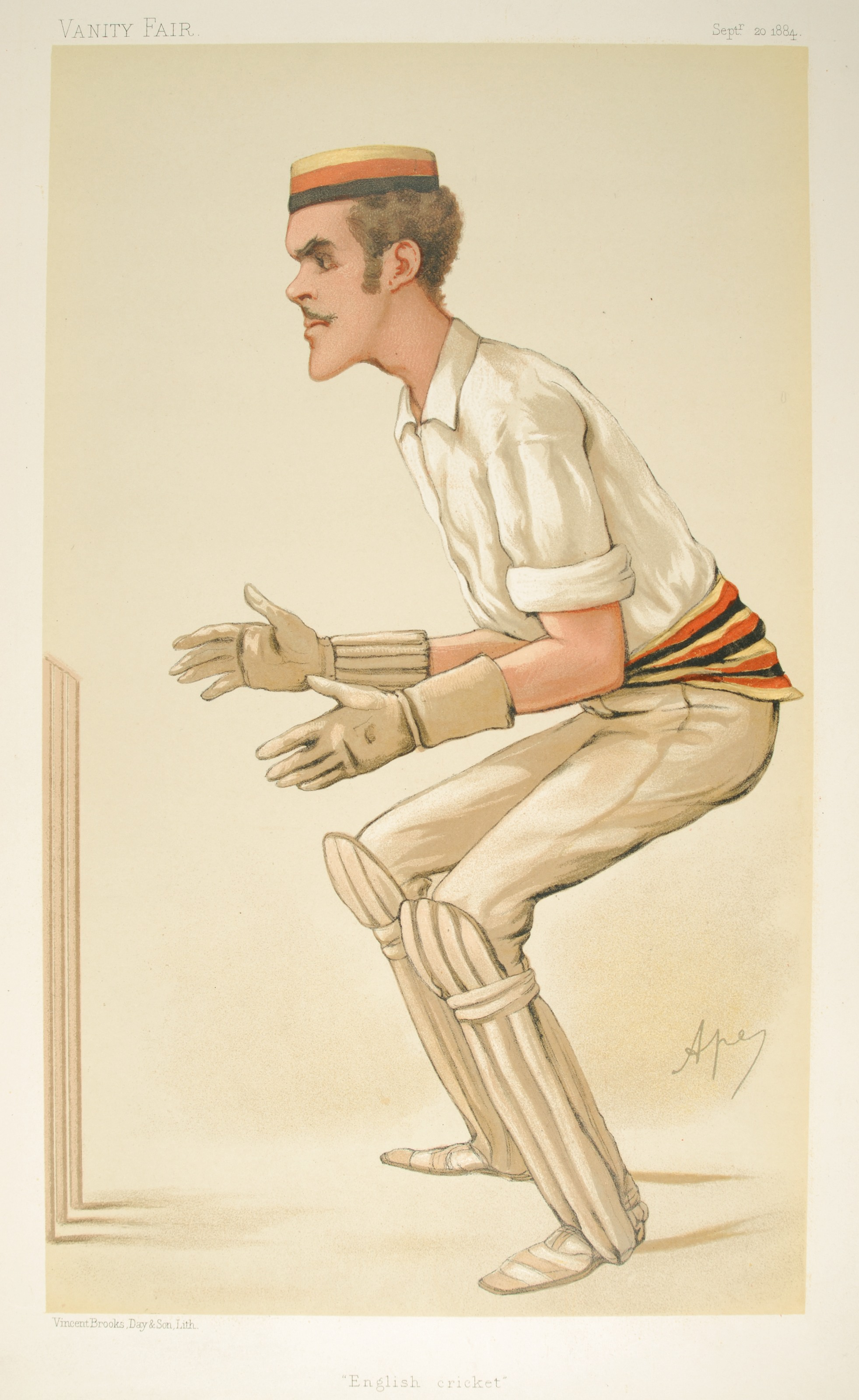
Etonian player Alfred Lyttelton also played first-class cricket, as depicted in this 1884 caricature.

The final took place at Kennington Oval. Three sets of brothers played in the match: Francis and Hubert Heron lined up for the Wanderers, while the Etonians' team included Hon. Edward Lyttelton and his brother Hon. Alfred Lyttelton as well as Albert Meysey-Thompson and his brother Charles. The latter pair's surname had been simply Thompson until it was legally changed in 1874, and for the final Albert played under the name Thompson and Charles under the name Meysey. As of the 21st century, it remains the only FA Cup final in which two or more pairs of brothers played. The Etonian team also included Julian Sturgis, who had been born in the United States and was the first player to appear in the Cup final who was not born either in Britain or to British parents residing in the overseas territories of the British Empire. Arthur Kinnaird, who had captained Wanderers to victory in the 1873 final, now captained the Etonian team. The crowd was estimated by the press at 3,500, the largest for an FA Cup final to that point.

Wanderers began the match with two full-backs, two half-backs and six forwards, while the Etonians opted for one full-back, two half-backs and seven forwards. Wanderers won the coin toss for the choice of ends in the first half and chose to start the game defending the Harleyford Road end of the Oval. The match was played in a strong wind, and when Frederick Maddison took a corner kick for Wanderers, the gale blew the ball back out of play. The Wanderers were awarded three early corner kicks, but none came to anything. Alfred Lyttelton made an attacking run but it was countered by the defending of Francis Birley and William Lindsay. A reporter for The Observer noted that "the game was carried on with great spirit by both sides without much advantage to either" for 35 minutes until Charles Wollaston eluded Thompson and passed the ball to John Hawley Edwards. With what a reporter for The Daily Telegraph called a "very fine kick", he put the ball into the Etonians' goal to give Wanderers the lead. The Wanderers' forwards had further attacking opportunities but were too slow to take a shot on goal and at half-time the score remained 1–0. The Daily Telegraph reporter praised Quintin Hogg, the Etonians' goalkeeper, for his "coolness and pluck" in the first half of the game.

After ends were changed at half-time, the Old Etonians had the wind, which had by now increased in intensity, in their favour in the second half and had the better of the play. Around five minutes after the interval, an errant kick by one of the Wanderers' backs gave away a corner kick to the Etonians. This led to a "scrimmage" (a term in common use at the time to describe a group of players all struggling to gain possession of the ball, now usually referred to as a "goalmouth scramble") in front of their opponents' goal, which resulted in the ball and a number of players being forced over the goal-line, uprooting the goalposts in the process. Modern sources credit the goal to Alexander Bonsor, but contemporary newspaper reports do not mention his name, merely noting that the goal was scored "from a scrimmage". Following their equaliser, the Etonians had the better of the play for a short time before their opponents began to dominate, the Wanderers' forwards passing the ball between themselves well. Neither team managed to score another goal and the game finished with the scores level, meaning that for the second successive season a replay would be needed to determine the winners of the competition. The referee had the option to order thirty minutes of extra time but chose not to exercise this due to a number of players struggling with injuries.

=== Details ===
11 March 1876

| Wanderers | 1–1 | Old Etonians |
|---|---|---|
| Edwards 35' | | Bonsor (unconfirmed) 50' |

Kennington Oval, London
Attendance: 3,500
Referee: W. S. Buchanan (Clapham Rovers)

| Wanderers | Old Etonians |

Wanderers:
| GK | W. D. O. Greig |
| FB | Alfred Stratford |
| FB | William Lindsay |
| HB | Frederick Maddison |
| HB | Francis Birley (Captain) |
| FW | Charles Wollaston |
| FW | Francis Heron |
| FW | Hubert Heron |
| FW | John Hawley Edwards |
| FW | Jarvis Kenrick |
| FW | Thomas Hughes |

Old Etonians:
| GK | Quintin Hogg |
| FB | James Welldon |
| HB | Hon. Edward Lyttelton |
| HB | Albert Thompson |
| FW | Hon. Arthur Kinnaird (Captain) |
| FW | Charles Meysey |
| FW | Capt. William Kenyon-Slaney |
| FW | Hon. Alfred Lyttelton |
| FW | Julian Sturgis |
| FW | Alexander Bonsor |
| FW | Herbert Alleyne |

== Replay ==
=== Summary ===
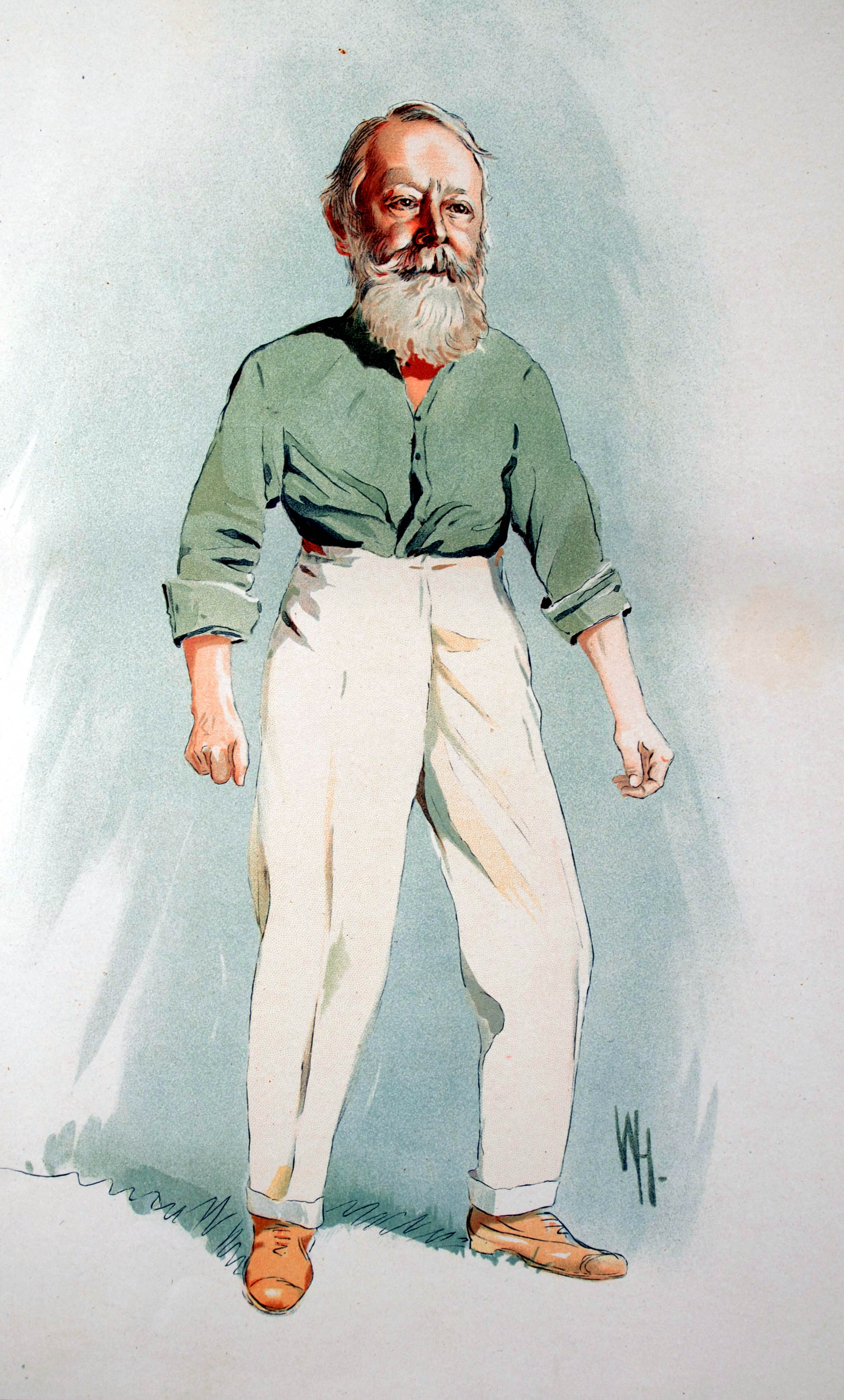
Arthur Kinnaird (1912 caricature) was nursing an injury from the first match.

The replay took place one week later at the same venue. The Wanderers fielded an unchanged team, but the Etonians had to make a number of changes, as Meysey was injured and three other players were unavailable due to other commitments. One of the replacements, Edgar Lubbock, had not long recovered from a bout of illness and was noted as being out of practice, and Kinnaird was still suffering the after-effects of an injury sustained in the original match. Francis Wilson, normally an outfield player, played in goal in place of Hogg, who was unavailable, although some newspaper reports erroneously listed Hogg in the line-up. The reported attendance was again 3,500. William Rawson, who had played for Oxford University in the 1874 final, was the referee, replacing W. S. Buchanan, who had undertaken the role for the original match. The weather on the day of the match was extremely cold, with the threat of snow.

The Etonians won the coin toss and the Wanderers kicked off defending the Harleyford Road end of the ground. The Etonians began the match playing in a rough manner, and there were many appeals from the players of both teams for handball, which resulted in a series of free kicks, all of which came to nothing. Edwards of the Wanderers made a strong run and took a shot at the Etonians' goal, but Sturgis and Alfred Lyttelton were able to repulse it. The Etonians then made a counter-attack, but the Wanderers' goalkeeper, W. D. O. Greig, kept the ball out of his goal. More free kicks were awarded to the Wanderers for handball but the Etonians successfully defended them all. After around half an hour, the Wanderers' forwards surged towards their opponents' goal and Wollaston got the final kick which sent the ball past Wilson. Almost immediately afterwards, another massed attack by the Wanderers led to Thomas Hughes doubling his team's lead. At the half-time interval, the score was 2–0 to the Wanderers.

Soon after half-time, Wollaston made a run for the Wanderers but found himself blocked. Shortly afterwards, Edwards, Francis Heron, and Jarvis Kenrick combined in a skilful attack and set up Hughes to score his second goal of the game. After this, according to The Daily Telegraph's report, William Kenyon-Slaney of the Etonians "dribbled the ball beautifully down the ground", resulting in the game's first corner kick. It marked the start of a period of end-to-end play, as the Wanderers quickly took the ball down to the opposite end of the pitch and gained a corner kick of their own before Herbert Alleyne of the Etonians made a run back the other way and had an unsuccessful shot at the Wanderers' goal. Free kicks continued to be awarded to both teams for handball. Sturgis, Alleyne, and Bonsor combined in another attack for the Etonians but play was stopped when Bonsor was deemed to be in an offside position. Late in the game, Hubert Heron of the Wanderers made a number of good runs and the Etonians made several further attacks, but no further goals resulted and the final score was 3–0 to the Wanderers. Birley, the winning team's captain, was praised for his performance by the press, as were both Lyttleton brothers for the Etonians.

=== Details ===
18 March 1876

| Wanderers | 3–0 | Old Etonians |
|---|---|---|
| Wollaston 30'; Hughes 33' 50' |

Kennington Oval, London
Attendance: 3,500
Referee: William Rawson (Oxford University)

| Wanderers | Old Etonians |

Wanderers:
| GK | W. D. O. Greig |
| FB | Alfred Stratford |
| FB | William Lindsay |
| HB | Frederick Maddison |
| HB | Francis Birley (c) |
| FW | Charles Wollaston |
| FW | Francis Heron |
| FW | Hubert Heron |
| FW | John Hawley Edwards |
| FW | Jarvis Kenrick |
| FW | Thomas Hughes |

Old Etonians:
| GK | Francis Wilson |
| FB | Edgar Lubbock |
| HB | Hon. Edward Lyttelton |
| HB | Matt Farrer |
| FW | Hon. Arthur Kinnaird (c) |
| FW | James Stronge |
| FW | Capt.William Kenyon-Slaney |
| FW | Hon. Alfred Lyttelton |
| FW | Julian Sturgis |
| FW | Alexander Bonsor |
| FW | Herbert Alleyne |

== Post-match ==
As occurred each year until 1882, the winning team did not receive the trophy at the stadium on the day of the match, but later in the year at their annual club dinner. In addition to receiving the Cup, the players each received a gold medal from the committee of Surrey County Cricket Club, the primary tenants of the Oval; Alcock, the Wanderers' former captain, was the secretary of the cricket club. Wollaston, who had played in both of the Wanderers' previous Cup final victories, became the first player to win the competition three times. He would retire from football having won the FA Cup five times, a record which was not broken until 2010, when Ashley Cole won his sixth. A week after the replay, four of the victorious Wanderers players were included in a select team which represented London in a match against an equivalent side from Sheffield. Despite their presence, the London XI lost the game 6–0.

The Wanderers won the Cup again in each of the next two seasons; as of 2024, this remains one of only two occasions when a team has won the competition in three consecutive seasons. The club's fortunes declined rapidly thereafter, partly because many of the team's leading players opted to play instead for the clubs set up specifically for the former pupils of their individual schools. The Wanderers last took part in the FA Cup in the 1879–80 season, and by the mid-1880s the club had ceased to play matches altogether. The Etonians won the Cup in 1879, defeating Clapham Rovers in the final. They reached the final again four years later but lost to Blackburn Olympic, the first occasion on which a team from a working-class background had won the Cup. The victory marked the end of the domination of the competition by teams of upper-class amateurs; no such team won the FA Cup again and the Etonians did not enter the competition after the 1887–88 season.

== Footnotes ==
a. This Crystal Palace club is not generally regarded as being the same as the modern club of the same name. In 2020, the modern club, which had long been regarded as having been formed in 1905, began asserting that it was a direct continuation of the team which existed in the 1870s based on new research by club historians, but this was disputed by other football researchers and rejected by the English football authorities.
