= Jarvis Kenrick =

English footballer (1852–1949)

Personal information
- Date of birth: 13 November 1852
- Place of birth: Chichester, England
- Date of death: 29 January 1949 (aged 96)
- Place of death: Blatchington, England
- Position: Forward

Senior career*
Years	Team	Apps	(Gls)
- Clapham Rovers
- Old Lancing
1874–1878	Wanderers	51	(24)
- * Club domestic league appearances and goals

Jarvis Kenrick (13 November 1852 – 29 January 1949) was an English footballer.

== Career ==
Born in Chichester, Sussex, Kenrick scored the first ever goal in the FA Cup, for Clapham Rovers in a 3–0 victory over Upton Park on 11 November 1871. Kenrick scored two goals in the match. He later won the FA Cup three years running with Wanderers, scoring in two consecutive finals; the FA Cup Final 1877, and again the following year, in which he scored twice.

Kenrick joined Wanderers in 1874, making his debut in a 2–1 win against Uxbridge on 14 January 1874. Kenrick scored his first, and only, hat-trick for the club in January 1875 against Harrow Chequers. In late 1875, Kenrick succeeded Charles W. Alcock as the secretary of Wanderers. Kenrick scored 20 goals in 51 games for the club, ranking him fourth on the club's all-time record scorers list.

On 18 November 1871, Kenrick played for an England representative side against Scotland after Thomas Hooman dropped out.

== Personal life ==
Kenrick was also a cricketer who played for Beddington Cricket Club. In a fixture against the Reigate Hill he took all 10 wickets in an innings and he made one first-class appearance for Surrey in 1876.

Kenrick was the Honorary Secretary of the Croquet Association from 1904 to 1909.

His sister, Margaret, was married to fellow Wanderers footballer Francis Birley.

Kenrick died in Blatchington, Sussex, on 29 January 1949, aged 96.

== Honours ==
Wanderers

- FA Cup: winners 1876, 1877 & 1878
