= Charles Wollaston =

English footballer

Personal information
- Full name: Charles Henry Reynolds Wollaston
- Date of birth: 31 July 1849
- Place of birth: Felpham, England
- Date of death: 22 June 1926 (aged 76)
- Place of death: London, England
- Position: Forward

Senior career*
Years	Team	Apps	(Gls)
- Oxford University
- Lancing Old Boys
1870–1880	Wanderers		
1880–????	Clapham Rovers		

International career
1874–1880	England	4	(1)
- * Club domestic league appearances and goals

Charles Henry Reynolds Wollaston (31 July 1849 – 22 June 1926) was an English footballer who played as a forward for Wanderers and England. He won the FA Cup five times with Wanderers, becoming the first player to do so. Wollaston was born in Felpham, Sussex and died in Westminster.

== Football career ==
Wollaston's first appearance of note was playing for the Oxford (University) Amalgamation club (while at Trinity College against Wanderers in December 1868. Wollaston first appeared for the Wanderers in February 1872, and his second game for the club was in the FA Cup semi-final against Queen's Park the next month. He played in the inaugural FA Cup Final in 1872 and scored in the second half of the 1873 final. In all he won five winner's medals, the first player to achieve this feat. Arthur Kinnaird, James Forrest and Patrick Vieira are the only other players with five FA Cup winning medals, and all of them are only bettered by Ashley Cole, who has won the FA Cup six times, beating the record in 2010. In Wanderers' 1874 FA Cup first round match against Farningham, Wollaston scored four goals in a 16–0 victory for Wanderers; the match was Wanderers biggest ever win. Wollaston had previously scored hat-tricks in 1872 against Clapham Rovers and in 1873 against Civil Service.

In 1879, Wollaston became Wanderers' club secretary, and was also the club's captain. In total, Wollaston played ten seasons for Wanderers and became the club's second top scorer, before joining Clapham Rovers in 1880/81. He earned four caps for England, scoring one goal. Wollaston captained the national side against Scotland in 1880; he was the eighth English team captain. Wollaston is also recorded as having refereed an 1884 match between Old Westminsters and Wednesbury Town.

In 2013, Wollaston was included on a special London Tube map released by the Football Association to celebrate its 150th anniversary. The map replaced station names with famous footballers.

=== Honours ===
Wanderers

- FA Cup winners: 1872, 1873, 1876, 1877, 1878

=== International goals ===
Scores and results list England's goal tally first.

#	Date	Venue	Opponent	Score	Result	Competition
1	6 March 1875	The Oval, Kennington	Scotland	1–0	2–2	Friendly

== Cricket career ==
Wollaston is known to have appeared in a total of 13 cricket matches between 1863 and 1869, although he did not play any first-class matches. He made appearances for Lancing College, FH Birley's XI, Oxford University freshman, and an Etceteras team. His first recorded appearance was for Lancing College against Brighton College at the Royal Brunswick Ground; Wollaston made scores of 6 and 12* in the match. Wollaston made a half-century in a match for FH Birley's XI against S Pelham's XI, and his last known match was for an Etceteras team against a Perambulators team, in which he scored 9 and 29*, and took one wicket.
