= Wanderers F.C. =

Wanderers
- Full name: Wanderers Football Club
- Nickname: Rovers
- Founded: 1859 (as Forest F.C.)
- Dissolved: 1887
Home colours

Wanderers Football Club was an English association football club. It was founded as "Forest Football Club" in 1859 in Leytonstone. In 1864, it changed its name to "Wanderers", a reference to it never having a home ground, instead playing at various locations in London and the surrounding area. Comprising mainly former pupils of the leading English public schools, Wanderers was one of the dominant teams in the early years of organised football and won the inaugural Football Association Challenge Cup (now known as the FA Cup) in 1872. The club won the competition five times in total, including three in succession from 1876 to 1878, a feat which has been repeated only once.

The club was a founder member of The Football Association (as Forest F.C.) in 1863 and played only friendly matches until the advent of the FA Cup in 1871. Prior to the standardised Laws of the Game, Wanderers played matches under various rules, and continued to do so even after the formation of the FA. Among the players who represented the club were C. W. Alcock, the so-called "father of modern sport", and Arthur Kinnaird, regarded as the greatest player of his day. By the 1880s the club's fortunes had declined and it was reduced to playing a single annual match against Harrow School, the alma mater of many of its founders. The club had dissolved by around 1887.

== History ==
=== Early years (1859–1871) ===
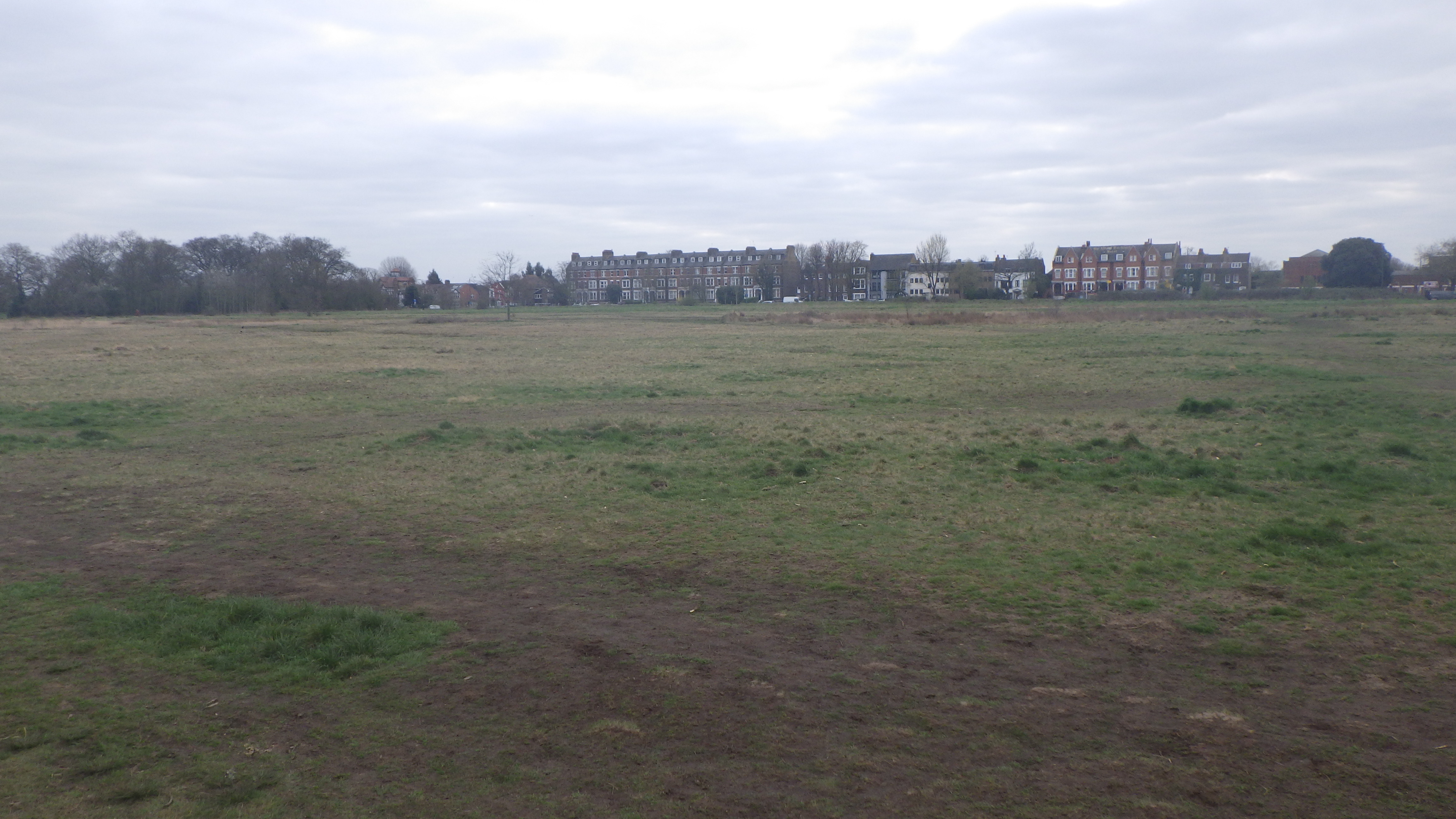
The ground at Leyton Flats, Epping Forest (pictured in 2019), where the Forest Club played its earliest football

The club was initially formed as Forest Football Club in 1859 by a number of former public school pupils, primarily recent Old Harrovian school leavers who wanted to continue to play the sport. The founding members included Charles W. Alcock, who had just left Harrow School, his brother John F. Alcock, J. Pardoe and brothers A. and W. J. Thompson. Several Old Foresters also played for the Forest club, as Forest School was located less than a mile north of the ground.

Forest's home ground from 1859 to 1865 was at Forest Place on Leyton Flats, a part of Epping Forest by the Whipps Cross Road between Snaresbrook and Leytonstone. For the first two years of the club's existence, the players organised matches among themselves at Forest Place. The first match against another club took place on 15 March 1862, and resulted in a victory over Crystal Palace (not the modern club of the same name). Both this match, and a return fixture between the two teams the following month, involved fifteen players on each team. At the time, the rules of association football had not been codified, and many variants existed, differing in the number of players per team, whether players were permitted to play the ball with their hands, or the method of scoring goals. The club's rulebook from 1861 was based on the Cambridge rules of 1856 with a small number of additions. In a September 1862 newspaper advertisement, the club sought opponents for matches "on the rules of the University of Cambridge".

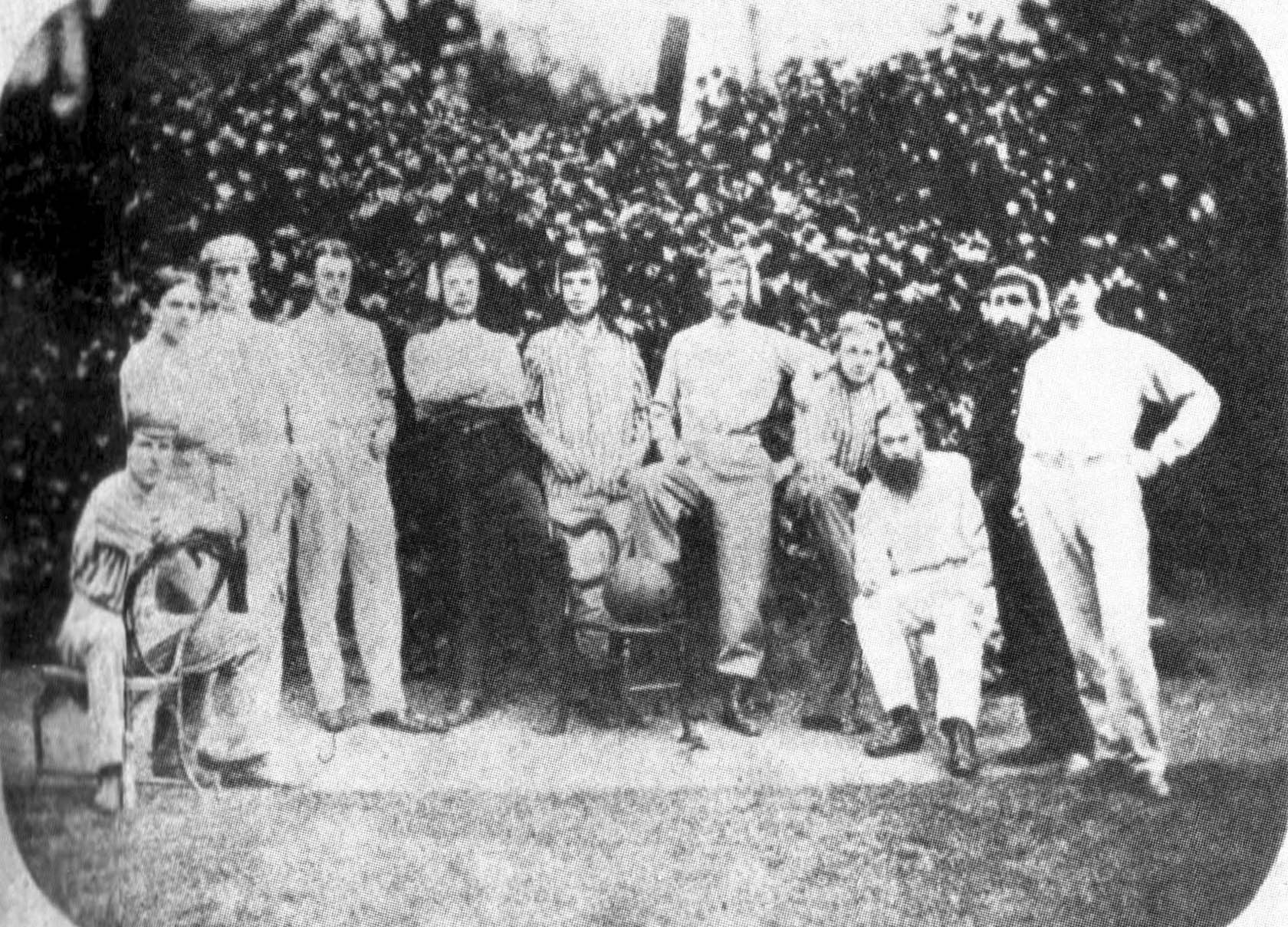
The only known photo of the team, taken in 1863 when the club was still known as Forest F.C.

In 1863 the Forest club was among the founder members of The Football Association (the FA) and adopted the rules set down by that body, although they continued to play occasional matches under other sets of rules against clubs not affiliated to the FA.

The following year, the club played its first match under the name Wanderers Football Club, against N.N. Club of Kilburn. Alcock had decided, possibly because of the expense the club was incurring by organising its own ground, to turn it into a "wandering" team with no fixed home venue, but it appears that some of the club's members opposed this idea. For the following season teams operated under both names, with several players appearing for both, and indeed Forest and Wanderers even played each other in one match, but after 1865 there is no record of any further matches under the Forest name. The Wanderers initially fared well, losing only one of their sixteen matches in the 1865–66 season, but over the subsequent four seasons the team's fortunes declined significantly and Alcock also found it increasingly difficult to ensure that eleven of his players actually turned up for a match, with the club often forced to play with fewer than the required number of players or borrow some from their opponents. During this period the club played a number of "home" matches at Battersea Park and Middlesex County Cricket Club's Lillie Bridge Grounds. Wanderers subsequently made Kennington Oval its semi-permanent home in 1869. The club played 151 matches at The Oval.

=== Cup success (1872–1878) ===
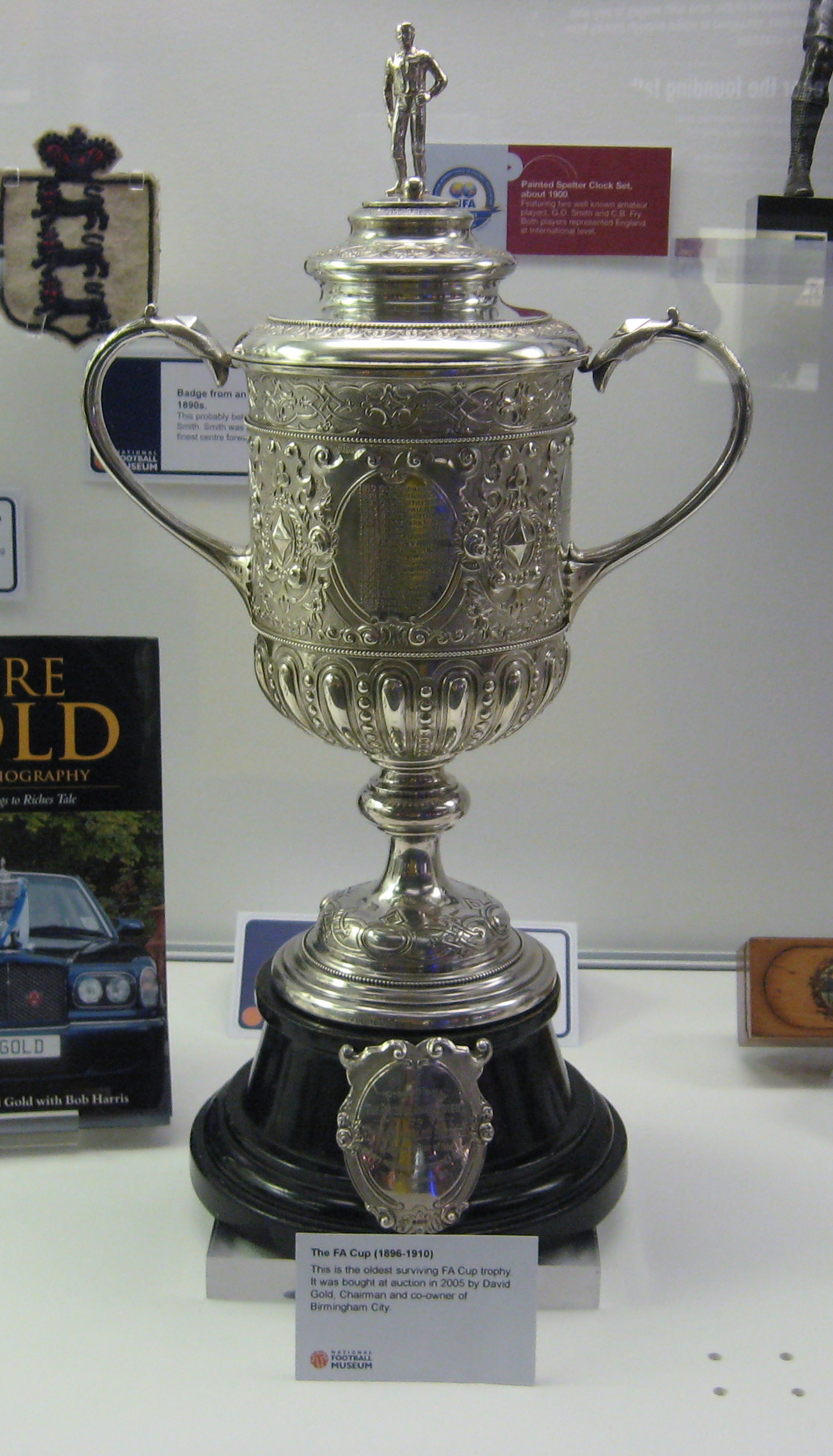
The second FA Cup trophy, pictured here, is identical in design to that won by Wanderers. The original trophy was stolen in 1895 and never recovered

In the 1870–71 season, the Wanderers finally turned around their fortunes, losing only five of thirty-seven matches played. For the following season the FA, following a suggestion by Alcock, initiated the Football Association Challenge Cup, a knock-out tournament open to all member clubs. Due to a combination of their opponents withdrawing and an unusual rule in place at the time which allowed both clubs to progress to the next round in the event of a draw, Wanderers won only one game in the four rounds leading up to the final, held at the Kennington Oval on 16 March 1872. The club beat the Royal Engineers 1–0 to become the first ever winners of the cup, the winning goal being scored by Morton Betts, who was playing under the pseudonym "A. H. Chequer".

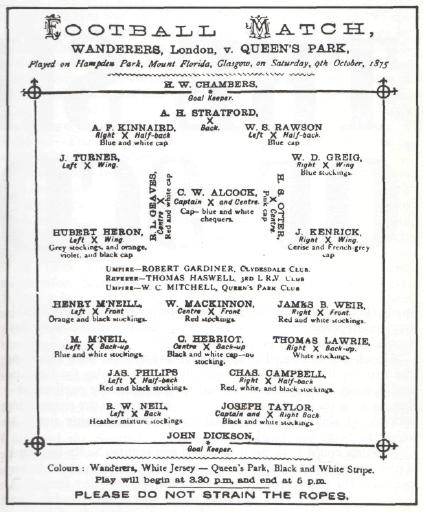
The programme from Wanderers' match away to Queen's Park in October 1875

The following season, under the competition's original rules, Wanderers, as holders, received a bye all the way to the final. In the final Wanderers beat Oxford University 2–0 to retain the cup, thanks in large part to the performance of A. F. Kinnaird. The club was unable to replicate this success over the next two seasons, although the team did manage a club record 16–0 victory over Farningham in the first round of the 1874–75 FA Cup.

In October 1875, Wanderers travelled to Scotland for the first time, to play a match against the leading team from north of the border, Queen's Park. Despite fielding their strongest team, Wanderers were outclassed by the Scots and lost 5–0. The London club gained its revenge four months later, when Queen's Park travelled to London for a re-match and lost 2–0. This was the first match the Glasgow club, which had been formed nine years earlier, had ever lost. Wanderers reached the semi-finals of the FA Cup without conceding a goal and then defeated Swifts to set up a final against Old Etonians. The Etonians' team contained five former Wanderers players, including Kinnaird. After the initial match finished in a 1–1 draw, Wanderers won the replay 3–0 to win the tournament for the third time.

The following season, with Kinnaird back in the team, Wanderers overcame indifferent early form to again reach the Cup final, and defeated Oxford University to retain the trophy. Wanderers again dominated the competition in the 1877–78 season, scoring nine goals in both their first and second round matches. The final was a rematch of the 1872 final and Wanderers again defeated Royal Engineers to win an unprecedented third consecutive FA Cup. The rules of the competition stated that under such circumstances the trophy would be retired and become the permanent property of the victorious club, but Alcock returned the cup to the FA on the condition that the rule be removed and no other team permitted to claim it on a permanent basis. Following the final, Wanderers played the reigning Scottish Cup holders, Vale of Leven, but lost 3–1.

=== Decline (1879–1887) ===
The Wanderers' fortunes declined rapidly following the club's hat-trick of FA Cup wins. By 1878, football clubs had been set up for former pupils of all the leading public schools, and many leading players chose to play for their respective old boys' team instead. Wanderers' fixture list was dramatically reduced in the 1878–79 season, and the team was knocked out of the FA Cup in the first round, losing 7–2 to an Old Etonians team led by Kinnaird. The following season Wanderers managed to reach the third round of the Cup, but lost again to the Etonians, after which many more key players left the club.

The club struggled on into the 1880–81 season, but was forced to withdraw from the 1880–81 FA Cup after being unable to raise a team for the scheduled first round match against Rangers. After 1881, the club was reduced to playing only one match per year, against Harrow School each Christmas. A book published by the newspaper The Sportsman claimed that the club folded in 1884, but a match at Harrow was reported in The Times in December 1887, which Harrow won 3–1.

=== Revival of Forest club ===
In 1868, the Forest club was revived in Woodford, Essex, wearing jerseys, caps, and stockings which were scarlet in front and black behind, with white shorts. In October 1868, it was reported that the reformed club played its first match on the "old ground" in front of Forest Place. Subsequent matches were played 200 yards from George Lane station in Woodford. In imitation of the Wanderers, the club's members were often members of other clubs, and the secretary would choose whichever members were willing and able to play, but after the creation of the FA Cup this model was not sustainable, and the club's final match was a 0–0 draw away to Clapton Pilgrims in March 1872. Pilgrims raised an issue with the FA about clubs borrowing players from other clubs after that match.

== Colours and crest ==
Wanderers are known to have played in orange, violet, and black for most of their existence, although as no photographs of the team exist, the exact design is not known. The FA's parade of winners at the 1972 FA Cup final suggested horizontal stripes, and a replica shirt sold in the modern era followed suit, a likely arrangement given that horizontally-striped shirts were very common during the Victorian era.

For the October 1875 match with Queen's Park, the club wore white shirts. In the absence of shirt numbering, which would not be introduced for another sixty years, the match card identifies the individual players by the colours of their stockings (socks) or caps, with Alcock and Kinnaird both listed as wearing blue and white caps and Jarvis Kenrick identified by his cerise and French grey cap, the colours of his former club Clapham Rovers.

1859: Forest FC	1868–1880

== Grounds ==
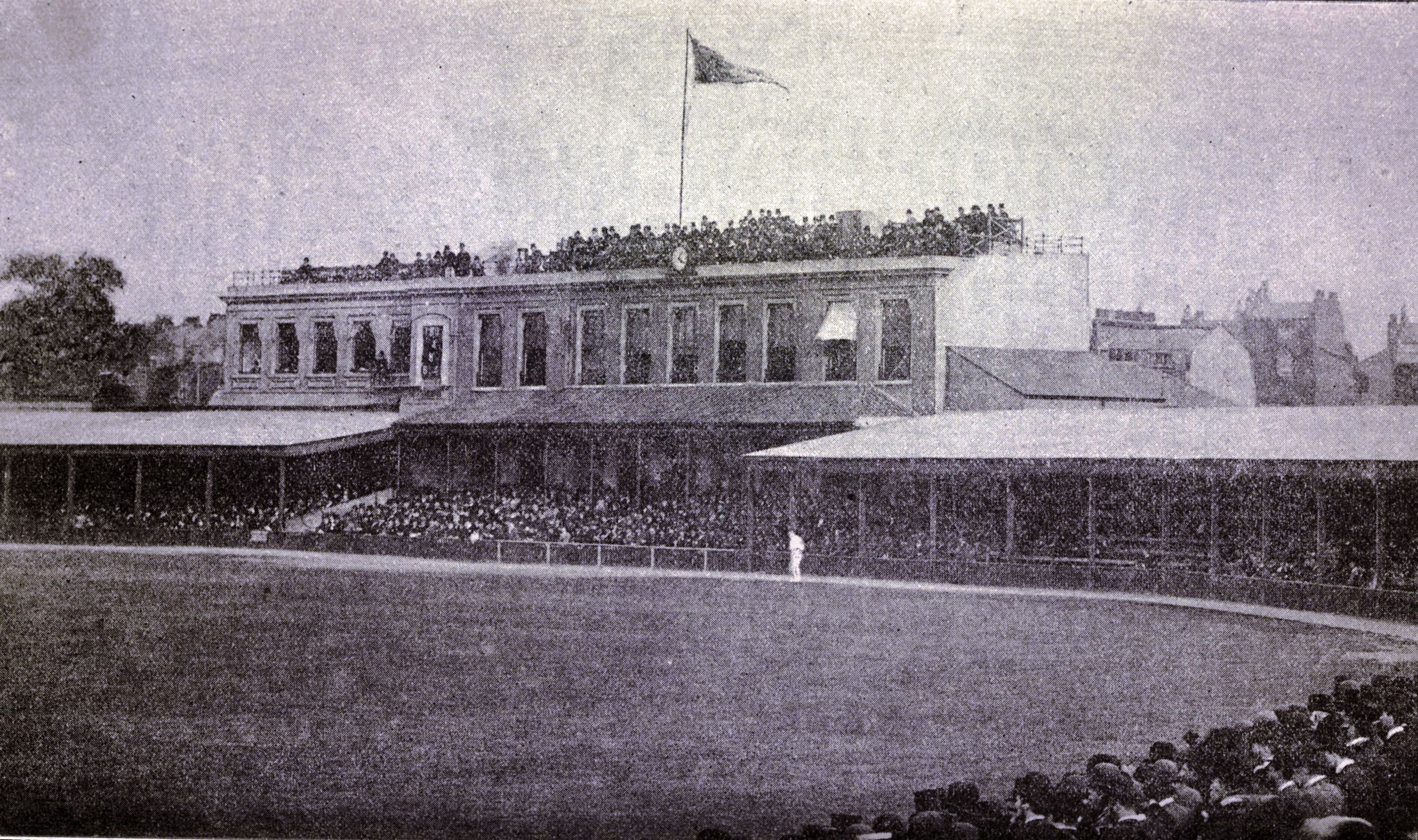
Wanderers played 151 games at the Kennington Oval (seen in 1891).

Forest F. C. played at common land in front of Forest Place on Leyton Flats between 1859 and 1865. This is now part of Epping Forest by the Whipps Cross Road between Snaresbrook and Leytonstone, about 500 metres south of the Snaresbrook Crown Court. When Forest re-formed in 1868–1872, apart from the first game at the old ground at Forest Place they played at South Woodford, close to George Lane.

Wanderers played at several locations between 1864 and 1887 throughout London, but predominantly at Kennington Oval (151 games), Vincent Square (31), Harrow (23), Harrow School (15) and Clapham Common (12). Battersea Park has been erroneously attributed as Wanderers home ground, however Wanderers played just 10 games there between 1864 and 1867.

== Rivalries ==
Prior to the formation of The Football Association in 1863, individual schools played football according to their own particular rules. Due to the connection Wanderers had with Harrow School, the school's football team played Wanderers frequently – 33 games between the two were recorded between 1865 and 1883. Among the club's other regular opponents were Royal Engineers, Clapham Rovers and Civil Service.

== Players ==
A total of fifteen players who listed Wanderers as their primary club played for the England national team in international matches, as follows:

- C. W. Alcock (1 cap)
- Francis Birley (1 cap)
- Alexander Bonsor (2 caps)
- Frederick Green (1 cap)
- Francis Heron (1 cap)
- Hubert Heron (3 caps)
- Leonard Howell (1 cap)
- William Kenyon-Slaney (1 cap)
- Robert Kingsford (1 cap)
- William Lindsay (1 cap)
- Alfred Stratford (1 cap)
- Henry Wace (3 caps)
- Reginald de Courtenay Welch (1 cap)
- Charles Wollaston (4 caps)
- John Wylie (1 cap)

The following players earned international selection whilst playing at other clubs, but held membership of Wanderers:

- Alexander Morten (1 cap)
- Edward Hagarty Parry (3 caps)
- John Frederick Peel Rawlinson (1 cap)
- Francis Sparks (3 caps)

Additionally, A. F. Kinnaird made one appearance for Scotland and John Hawley Edwards played his one game for Wales while holding membership of the club. Edwards was the first treasurer of the Welsh Football Association and one of only two players to play for England and Wales at full international level. A number of Wanderers players appeared in the England vs Scotland representative matches which took place prior to what is now recognised as the first official international match. Legendary cricketer W. G. Grace also played for the side, but did not take part in any FA Cup finals.

== Club officials ==
The first Wanderers secretary was A. W. Mackenzie (1859–1864). He was succeeded by C. W. Alcock (1864–1875), Jarvis Kenrick (1875–1879) and Charles Wollaston (1879–1883).

== Records and statistics ==
Complete FA Cup record
Season	Performance
1871–72	Winners
1872–73	Winners
1873–74	Lost in quarter-finals
1874–75	Lost in quarter-finals
1875–76	Winners
1876–77	Winners
1877–78	Winners
1878–79	Lost in first round
1879–80	Lost in third round
1880–81	Withdrew
1881–82	Withdrew

Although records are incomplete, C. W. Alcock is believed to have played the most matches for the Wanderers, with at least 199 appearances, and to have scored the most goals, with at least 82. He also recorded the highest goalscoring total for an individual season, with 17 known goals in the 1870–71 season, including four in a 6–1 win over Civil Service. R. K. Kingsford bettered that feat when he scored five goals against Farningham in 1874, the most goals scored by a Wanderers player in a single match. The 16–0 margin of victory in the Farningham match was by far the largest win achieved by Wanderers, with no other scores in double-figures recorded. The most goals conceded by Wanderers was eight, in an 8–2 defeat to Clapham Rovers in 1879; the club also lost by a six-goal margin on at least one other occasion, a 6–0 defeat to Queen's Park in 1876.

Wanderers' total of five FA Cup final wins remained a record until Aston Villa won the competition for the sixth time in 1920. As of 2018, only eight clubs have won the tournament more times than the Wanderers.

== Honours ==
The club won the first FA Cup, won three in a row and appeared in the FA Cup Final five times, winning each time. Wanderers hold the joint record for most consecutive wins with Blackburn Rovers and A. F. Kinnaird holds the record for appearances in a Final with nine. Wanderers are tied for ninth place with Everton and West Bromwich Albion for the most FA Cup wins.

- FA Cup
  - Winners: 1871–72, 1872–73, 1875–76, 1876–77, 1877–78

== Modern clubs ==
Sporting sides of Harrow School still use the Wanderers name and a Harrow alumni side named Wanderers took part in a 150th Anniversary Cup match against the Harrow first team in 2022, celebrating 150 years of the FA Cup. In 2009 a club bearing the name Wanderers F.C. was formed in London, initially for a fundraising match. The club competes in the Surrey South Eastern Combination and claims approval from descendants of some original Wanderers players.
