= 1871–72 in Scottish football =

Football in Scotland
- Season: 1871–72

1871–72 in Scottish football

Teams in the FA Cup
- Queen's Park

Season 1871–72 marked the first occasion in which any football team from Scotland participated in official competition, either at club or international level, when Queen's Park, the foremost club of the day, entered the inaugural FA Cup.

== Overview ==
The foundation of Queen's Park in 1867 had begun to put football, which had persisted in various wholly unorganised recreational forms for centuries, on a more organised basis. A number of other clubs had come into being, occasionally playing challenge matches against each other, but as yet no governing body for the game or organised competitions existed within Scotland. In England, the Football Association (FA) had been in existence since 1863, and in 1871–72 it staged the first ever FA Cup competition. As it was not yet apparent that the FA and its Cup would become primarily English (as opposed to British even worldwide), Queen's Park were invited to enter.

On the international front, official and fully representative matches had yet to be organised. A series of "England v Scotland" matches in London organised by C. W. Alcock had begun in 1870, however the Scottish sides were almost entirely selected from London residents, these matches are not officially recognised. It would be November 1872 before the first recognised international fixture took place.

== Teams in F.A. Cup ==
Without any precedents to draw on, the first FA Cup was organised on a haphazard basis, as illustrated by Queen's Park's progress. They were drawn in the first round to play Donington School from Lincolnshire, the only other entrants from outwith the Home Counties, but when the clubs were unable to agree a date for the fixture, the FA permitted both to progress to the next round. This time they were paired again, but Donington withdrew from the competition. With five teams left in the competition, Queen's were awarded a bye into the semi-finals, still without having played a match.

The semi-final draw paired Queen's Park with Wanderers, and after raising money by public subscription the Scots travelled to London, where a goalless draw was secured at Kennington Oval. Queen's, however, could not afford to extend their stay long enough for the tie to be replayed and were forced to withdraw from the competition.

Season	Club	Round	Score	Result
1871–72	Queen's Park	1st round	n/a	Received bye
1871–72	Queen's Park	2nd round	(England) Donington School	Withdrew
1871–72	Queen's Park	3rd round	n/a	Received bye
1871–72	Queen's Park	Semi-final	(England) Wanderers	0–0
1871–72	Queen's Park	Semi-final replay	(England) Wanderers	Withdrew
