= Edmond Cotter =

British Army officer, footballer & Irish Republican (1852-1934)

Edmond William Cotter
- Born: 12 February 1852; Valletta, Malta
- Died: 23 August 1934 (aged 82); Bournemouth, Hampshire, England
- Education: St Munchin's College, Limerick, Ireland
- Spouse: Jessie Tyeth Frost (m. 1876)
- Children: 5
- Parents: Sgt. John Cotter (1823–1882) (father); Anne Marie Hickey (1830–1857) (mother)
- Military career
- Branch: (United Kingdom) British Army
- Service years: 1871–1904
- Rank: Colonel
- Units: 3rd Foot 'The Buffs'; Bengal Sappers & Miners
- Conflicts: Ashanti campaign Zhob Valley Expedition; Nile Expedition; Burma Expedition
Association football career
- Position: Forward
Senior career*
Years	Team	Apps	(Gls)
187?–187?	Royal Engineers		
- * Club domestic league appearances and goals

Col. Edmond William Cotter (12 February 1852 – 23 August 1934) was an Irish Republican, who played for the Royal Engineers in the 1872 FA Cup Final. As a soldier, he was engaged in four military campaigns: the Ashanti campaign of 1873–74, the Zhob Valley Expedition of 1884, the Nile Expedition of 1884–85 and the Burma Expedition of 1887–88. At the end of his career, he was briefly involved with the United Irish movement.

== Family ==
Cotter was born in Valletta, Malta, the second of three children born to John Cotter (1823–1882) and his first wife Jane Maria née Hickey (1830–1857).

John Cotter was a career soldier who had enlisted in the 3rd Foot 'The Buffs' aged 17 in 1840. At the time of Edmond's birth, John Cotter was a sergeant. During the Crimean War (1853–1856), he was promoted to Colour Sergeant and Acting Adjt. Major, before further promotion in the field to Lieutenant in February 1856. This promotion was made permanent on 3 March 1858. He was promoted to Captain on 5 January 1870 and retired on 1 July 1881. While serving with the 2nd Battalion, The Buffs in Malta in 1858, Adjutant Cotter, not wanting to be shown up in front of the 21st Royal (North British) Fusiliers, spurred his men on with the words: "Steady, the Buffs! The Fusiliers are watching you", thus originating the expression, "Steady, the Buffs!".

== Education ==
Cotter was educated at St Munchin's College in Limerick, Ireland followed by the Royal Military Academy, Woolwich from 1868 to 1871.

== Football career ==
Cotter represented the RMA at association football, before joining the Royal Engineers. Cotter played as a forward and "revelled in rushes and scrimmages".

In November 1871, the Royal Engineers were among fifteen teams who entered the inaugural FA Cup competition; after victories over Hitchin (5–0), Hampstead Heathens (3–0) and Crystal Palace (3–0 after a replay), the Engineers met Wanderers, the top amateur club of the day, in the first FA Cup Final, played at Kennington Oval on 16 March 1872, which the Engineers lost 1–0, to a goal from Morton Betts.

Cotter was also a good cricketer who played for the Royal Engineers in 1873 and made one appearance for Warwickshire in 1877.

== Military career ==
Cotter graduated from RMA Woolwich and joined the Royal Engineers as a lieutenant on 2 August 1871. Fellow graduates on the same day were two of his fellow FA Cup finalists, Alfred Goodwyn and Herbert Muirhead, as well as Richard Ruck, who played in the 1875 FA Cup Final. Cotter was promoted to captain twelve years later.

Cotter received further promotions, to major on 18 January 1890 and to lieutenant-colonel on 1 October 1897, becoming a full colonel on 1 October 1901.

Cotter was based at Chatham between August 1871 and November 1873, when he was posted to the Gold Coast under General Garnet Wolseley, where he served in the Ashanti campaign, including the Defence of Quarman during the Battle of Amoaful where he was part of a rearguard force to the main action. Cotter was awarded the Ashantee Medal with the Coomassie clasp.

Cotter returned to England with his regiment in March 1874, before being posted to India in November 1874, where he was an assistant engineer, returning to England in July 1876. Between January 1878 and March 1880, he was based in Gibraltar, returning to England where he was based in Portsmouth Dockyard and then in Ireland until December 1883, when he was again posted to India. In 1884, he was part of the Zhob Valley Expedition, where he was in command of the 4th Company, Bengal Sappers & Miners under Brigadier-General Sir Oriel Tanner.

Cotter returned to Chatham in February 1885, but his stay was short-lived and in April he was posted to Egypt where he served in the Nile Expedition of 1884–85. He was a station officer at Aswan and Shellal manning the lines of communication, before becoming the District R.E. Officer with the Frontier Field Force under Major General Francis Grenfell.

In October 1885, he returned to India until February 1891, during which time he served with the Burma Field Force Sappers & Miners in the Burma Expedition of 1887–88, for which he was awarded the India General Service Medal with clasp. He was posted back to England in 1891, where he was based in Norwich until September 1892, when he was again posted to Egypt for five years. He spent the last five years of his military service in Ireland based at Cork. On 8 November 1897, The Times reported that Lt. Col. E W Cotter was appointed Commanding R.E., Cork District following his promotion.

Cotter was reduced to half-pay in October 1902, and retired on £450 per year on 12 October 1904.

The family report that in the army, Cotter acquired the nickname 'Terror Cotter' for his terrible temper and that his servants would hide if they heard him approaching.

== Irish Republicanism ==
During his posting at Cork, it is reported that Cotter "became keenly and publicly interested in the United Irish movement, embarrassing relations serving in HM Forces when visiting them on board HM Ships".

In 1915, Cotter travelled to Dublin to work for the Irish Volunteers alongside Col. George Moore. Described by Bulmer Hobson as "an Irishman whose people had been in the British Army for several generations" and "a delightful old man [then aged 63], a man of first-rate ability", Cotter attempted to organise the Irish Volunteers on military lines. Another witness to the Irish Bureau of Military History, Diarmuid Coffey, described Cotter as "an elderly... idealistic nationalist (who) had commuted part of his pension in order to come over to Dublin and work for the Volunteers. He had a weak heart and was somewhat impulsive and excitable".

Cotter was appointed Chief of Staff under Moore, with Hobson and John Fitzgibbon as fellow members of the military staff. Cotter's time with the Irish Volunteers was short-lived, however, and he returned to England after three months when he ran out of funds to support himself, refusing offers of help, not wishing to be "a charge on the movement in any way". In his statement, Coffey said of Cotter:

He should be remembered as a great-hearted Irish gentleman who sacrificed his health and a large portion of the little money he had to serve his country but, unfortunately, owing to age and temperament was unable to make the mark which his intentions and devotion deserved.

== Wife and children ==
Cotter married Jessie Tyeth Frost (1855–1937) on 8 October 1876 at St Stephen's by Saltash, Saltash, Cornwall. The couple had five children:

- Isabella Maud Cotter (1877-1902) married 1898, at Cork, Frank Beauchamp Macaulay Chatterton
- Edmond Brian Cotter DSO (1879–1934), married 1902, at Bombay, Edith Violet Mayne
- John Luis Cotter MC (1880–1937) married Hilda May Jukes
- Phoebe Kathleen Cotter (1882–1963) married 1907, at Yeovil, George Henry Wedd
- Jessie Mary Elsie Cotter (1884–1962) married 1906, at Yeovil, Matthew George Hodgson Gribble (a.k.a. Jack Durham Matthews)

== Death ==
Cotter died at Cranleigh Road, Bournemouth on 23 August 1934.

== Bibliography ==
- Collett, Mike (2003). The Complete Record of the FA Cup. Sports Books. ISBN 1-899807-19-5.
- Gibbons, Philip (2001). Association Football in Victorian England – A History of the Game from 1863 to 1900. Upfront Publishing. ISBN 1-84426-035-6.
- Warsop, Keith (2004). The Early F.A. Cup Finals and the Southern Amateurs. Soccer Data. ISBN 1-899468-78-1.
