= Adam Bogle =

British soldier and footballer (1848–1915)

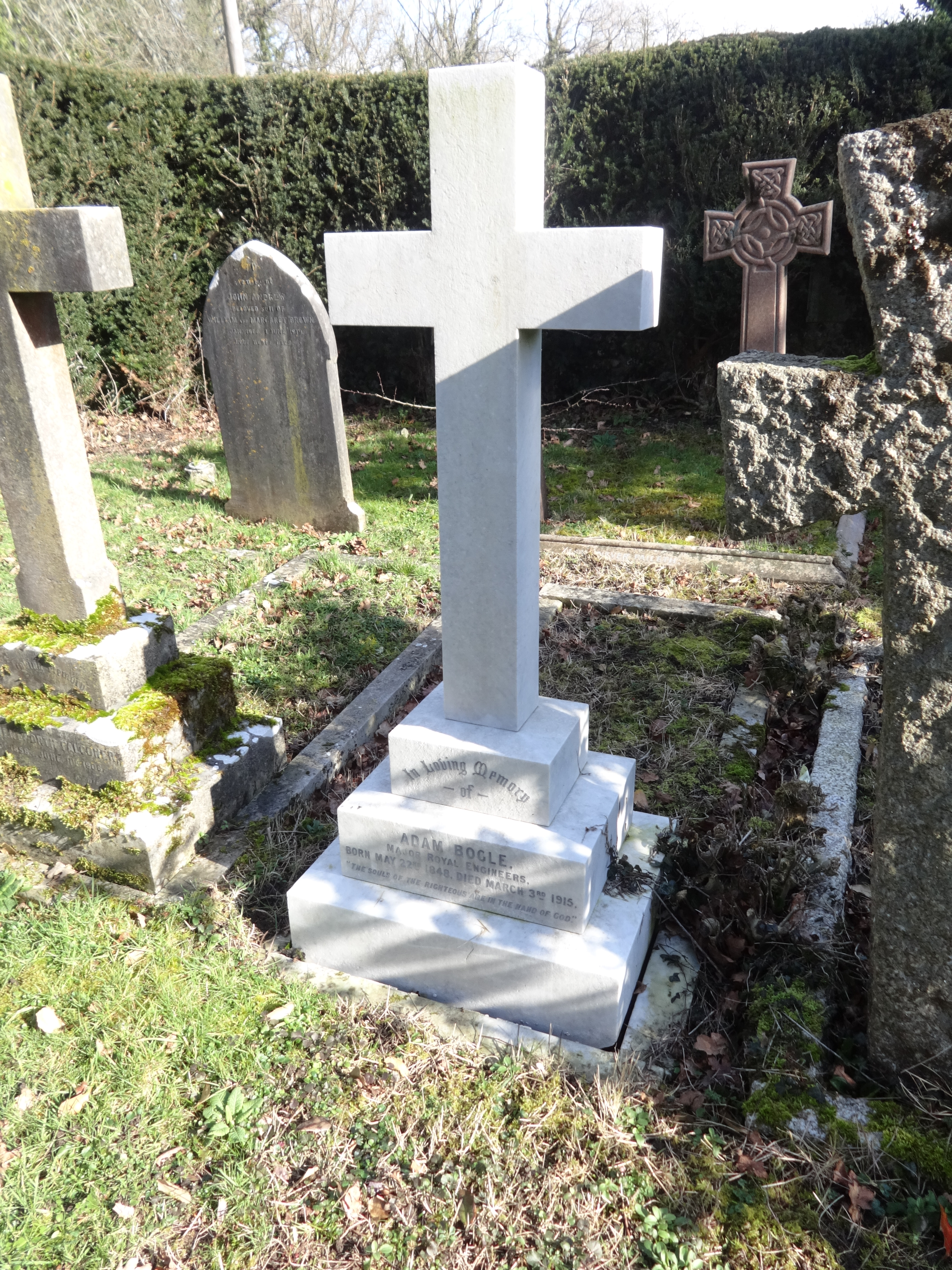
- Grave of Major Adam Bogle R.E., All Saints, Steep, Hampshire
- Born: 21 June 1848; Glasgow, Scotland
- Died: 3 March 1915 (aged 66); Steep, Hampshire, England
- Military career
- Rank: Major
- Unit: Royal Engineers
- Other work: Footballer

Major Adam Bogle (21 June 1848 – 3 March 1915) was a British soldier, who played for the Royal Engineers in the 1872 FA Cup Final.

== Family and education ==
Bogle was born in Glasgow, the son of John Bogle (1808–1879), a colonial merchant, and his wife Jane Sarah née Duterrau (1812–1885). Jane was the daughter of Benjamin Duterrau, the artist, with whom she had emigrated to Australia in 1832. She and John had married in Hobart, Tasmania, in February 1838, before returning to Britain, where they eventually settled at Woodside, near Torquay.

Adam Bogle was educated at Harrow between 1862 and 1865 followed by the Royal Military Academy, Woolwich until 1868.

== Football career ==
Bogle represented his school and the RMA at association football, before joining the Royal Engineers. Bogle played as a forward who "displayed the vigour and robust play typical of the Royal Engineers attackers". Later in his career, he also played for the Gitanos club.

In November 1871, the Royal Engineers were among fifteen teams who entered the inaugural FA Cup competition; after victories over Hitchin (5–0), Hampstead Heathens (3–0) and Crystal Palace (3–0 after a replay), the Engineers met Wanderers, the top amateur club of the day, in the first FA Cup Final, played at Kennington Oval on 16 March 1872. The Engineers lost 1–0, to a goal from Morton Betts.

== Military career ==
Bogle graduated from RMA Woolwich and joined the Royal Engineers as a lieutenant on 15 July 1868. Bogle was promoted to captain twelve years later and to major on 17 December 1889.

Between August 1868 and October 1870, Bogle was based at Chatham, before spending a year in Ireland. Between August 1871 and March 1874, he was based at the Royal Arsenal, Woolwich, before he was posted to Bermuda. In October 1876, he was transferred to Gibraltar until March 1879. Between April 1879 and May 1880, he was based at The Curragh (Ireland) before returning to Chatham. In February 1881, he was posted to Aldershot, being appointed instructor in fortifications in February 1882, a post he held for the next seven years.

After spending 1889 and 1890 in Jamaica, Bogle returned to England and was based at Dover until he retired on 25 May 1892.

== Later career ==
Bogle married Ethel Glossop (1857–1945) at St Matthias, Torquay on 20 July 1882. It would appear that the couple had no children.

There are few details of Bogle's career after his retirement from the army. By 1908, he and Ethel were living at "Collyers" near Steep, Hampshire, although in both the 1901 and 1911 censuses the house was only occupied by staff.

Bogle died at Collyers on 3 March 1915, leaving an estate of £26,740 and was buried at All Saints Church in Steep.

== Bibliography ==
- Collett, Mike (2003). The Complete Record of the FA Cup. Sports Books. ISBN 1-899807-19-5.
- Gibbons, Philip (2001). Association Football in Victorian England – A History of the Game from 1863 to 1900. Upfront Publishing. ISBN 1-84426-035-6.
- Warsop, Keith (2004). The Early F.A. Cup Finals and the Southern Amateurs. Soccer Data. ISBN 1-899468-78-1.
