= Combination Game =

Style of association football

The Combination Game was a style of association football based around teamwork and cooperation. It would gradually favour the passing of the ball between players over individual dribbling skills which had been a notable feature of early Association games. It developed from "scientific" football and is considered to be the predecessor of the modern passing game of football. It originated in Britain and its origins are associated with early clubs: Sheffield FC (founded 1857), The Royal Engineers AFC (founded 1863), Queen's Park FC (founded 1867) and Cambridge University AFC (founded 1856). Each of these claimants is supported by retrospective accounts from men who were notable in the early history of football. They are considered below in the order of earliest contemporary evidence of "scientific" football playing styles.

== Background ==
=== The effect of rule changes on playing style ===
The change to the original offside rule enabled the gradual transition from a dribbling to a passing game, this opened the way to forward passing. A similar rule had originally been part of the earlier Cambridge rules.

On 7 November 1863, the Football Association adopted an offside rule from J. C. Thring's law from the Simplest Game

A player is "out of play" immediately he is in front of the ball and must return behind the ball as soon as possible. If the ball is kicked by his own side past a player he may not touch or kick it, or advance until one of the other side has first kicked it or one of his own side on a level with or in front of him has been able to kick it.

This text was reflected in the first draft of laws drawn up by FA secretary Ebenezer Morley.

Later in the year this was replaced by a modified version of the equivalent law from the Cambridge Rules

When a player has kicked the ball any one of the same side who is nearer to the opponent's goal line is out of play and may not touch the ball himself nor in any way whatever prevent any other player from doing so until the ball has been played; but no player is out of play when the ball is kicked from behind the goal line.

The law adopted by the FA was "strict"—i.e., it penalised any player in front of the ball. There was one exception for the "kick from behind the goal line" (the 1863 laws' equivalent of a goal kick). This exception was necessary because every player on the attacking side would have otherwise been "out of play" from such a kick.

In 1866/67 the offside rule was loosened – at the behest of representatives of Charterhouse and Westminster School –

When a player has kicked the ball, any one of the same side who is nearer to the opponents' goal line is out of play, and may not touch the ball himself, nor in any way whatever prevent any other player from doing so, until the ball has been played, unless there are at least three of his opponents between him and their own goal; but no player is out of play when the ball is kicked from behind the goal line.

=== Charles W. Alcock ===
The earliest reference to the term "combination game" is made by Charles W. Alcock in 1874 when he states that "Nothing succeeds better than what I may call a 'combination game'." Alcock is referring to an early system of cooperation known as 'backing up' which he defines as a... "process of following closely on a fellow player, to assist him if required, and to take the ball if he be attacked or prevented from continuing his onward course." Although a keen dribbler, Alcock is notable as being the first footballer ever to be ruled offside on 31 March 1866, confirming that players were probing ways of exploiting the new offside rule right from the start. As early as 1870 Alcock stated that he preferred playing football in a "scientific" way. An example of this was reported in a contemporary account of the November 1870 football match between England and Scotland "Mr Alcock made a splendid run ... and being cleverly supported by Mr Walker, a goal was obtained ... by the latter" A further contemporary reference shows that Alcock himself was playing "in concert" with his teammates during the 1871 international match between England and Scotland:

indeed it seemed as if the [Scottish] defence would prove more than equal to the attack until a well executed run down by C W Alcock, WC Butler and RSF Walker, acting in concert, enabled the last named of the trio to equalise the score by the accomplishment of a well merited goal

These examples of cooperation fit in with the system of backing up, which was prevalent in the London Association game during the 1860s and early 1870s. As systematic forms of passing became more prevalent in association football, Alcock's views on combination would understandably change. Writing in 1883 he gives the following definition of combination:

Combination is the great object to be studied in the attainment of success in Association football. By combination I mean much more than the mere "passing on" which seems to be the one common idea of perfection among a large number of English Associationists... The superiority of the Association elevens of Scotland is not to be attributed to a greater skill of their forwards, or to the advantage of back play. It is to their combination - by which I mean the effective way in which they turn every chance of the game to account, never overlooking any one feature however unimportant it may appear of itself - that they owe their successes over English teams.

As the game continued to evolve Alcock would state in 1891: "An Association eleven of to-day is altogether a different machine to what it was even as recently as ten years ago.

== Scientific Football (1839 onwards) ==
The earliest uses of the term "scientific" in the context of sport are in the description of the obligatory team game cricket (1833). The first use of the term "scientific" to describe football comes from Dragley Beck, Ulverston, Lancashire, likely at what is known today as Lightburn Park, in 1839. This states:

FOOT-BALL. Last week a match took place in a field near Dragley Beck between the men of leather and the other trades of Ulverstone. The shoemakers &c challenged the other parties, and it was eventually agreed that each side should have 15 men. The ball was placed about the centre of the ground, and one from each side stood twenty yards from it. At a given signal, two opponents rushed forward, and the representative of leather, Roger Gaskell, took the ball in grand style, thereby winning the glaves. The action then became general, but leather was forced to be content with the laurels already won, as the other party won every bye that was played. Many of the gentle craft were good millers, and carried on the contest toughly, but their opponents played more scientifically, and out manoeuvred them, and carried the day in triumph."

"Scientific" was first used to describe a modern football code in 1862 with reference to Rugby football: and in 1868 the "great science" of rugby football consisted of "off your side, drop kicks punts, places and the other intricacies." It is uncertain what these other intricacies were exactly, however it is clear that this playing style was more systematic than in the past. References to scientific football come in accounts in the mid-1860s, particularly Sheffield FC (see later). Later contemporary accounts include internationals, for example the November 1870 association football match between England and Scotland which "was of unusual excellence for the many scientific points it involved." Alcock advocated scientific football as early as 1870 (see below).

== Sheffield FC: Backing up and the "passing on" game (mid-1860s and early 1870s) ==
According to Alcock, Sheffield FA team provides the first evidence of combination, in particular the "passing on" of the Sheffield FA team and their Sheffield Rules. The offside system of the Sheffield rules allowed poaching or sneaking and the forward pass was permitted: Players known as "kick throughs" were positioned permanently near the opponents goal to receive these balls. For this reason the Sheffield style is known as the "passing on game". As early as January 1865 Sheffield F.C. was associated with scoring a goal through "scientific movements" against Nottingham A contemporary match report of November 1865 notes "We cannot help recording the really scientific play with which the Sheffield men backed each other up" Combination associated with Sheffield players is also suggested in 1868: "a remarkably neat and quick piece of play on the part of K Smith, Denton and J Knowles resulted in a goal for Sheffield, the final kick being given by J. Knowles"

Contemporary proof of passing occurs from at least January 1872. In January 1872 the following account is given against Derby: "W. Orton, by a specimen of careful play, running the ball up in close proximity to the goal, from which it was returned to J. Marsh, who by a fine straight shot kicked it through" This play taking place "in close proximity to the goal" suggests a short pass and the "return" of the ball to Marsh suggests that this was the second of two passes. This account also goes onto describe other early tactics: "This goal was supplemented by one of T. Butler's most successful expositions of the art of corkscrew play and deceptive tactics which had the effect of exciting the risibility of the spectators" A similar account also comes from January 1872: "the only goal scored in the match was obtained by Sheffield, owing to a good run up the field by Steel, who passed if judiciously to Matthews, and the latter, by a good straight kick, landed it through the goal out of reach of the custodian". This match (against Notts) also provided contemporary evidence of "good dribbling and kicking" particularly by W. E. Clegg. The condition of the ground, however, "militated against a really scientific exhibition". Their play in March 1872 was described as "speed, pluck and science of no mean order"

== The Royal Engineers A.F.C.: The first combination team (late 1860s to mid-1870s) ==
Sir Frederick Wall (who was the secretary of the Football Association from 1895 to 1934) states in his biography that the combination game was first used by the Royal Engineers A.F.C. in the early 1870s, in particular prior to their 1873 tour of Nottingham, Derby and Sheffield . Wall states that the "Sappers moved in unison" and showed the "advantages of combination over the old style of individualism". He goes on to state that they were the first "to show the value of combination in Sheffield and Nottingham. Wall attended and regularly refers to the 1872 international match in his account (see below) and speaks very highly of many Scottish teams and players but he does not attribute the combination game to either of these. The Engineers were also capable of dribbling the ball, for example one 1868 match reports states "Lieut. Morris got off and dribbling the ball quite round his opponents, brought it in front of the goal and a kick from Lieut Dorward scored the first goal for the Royal Engineers".

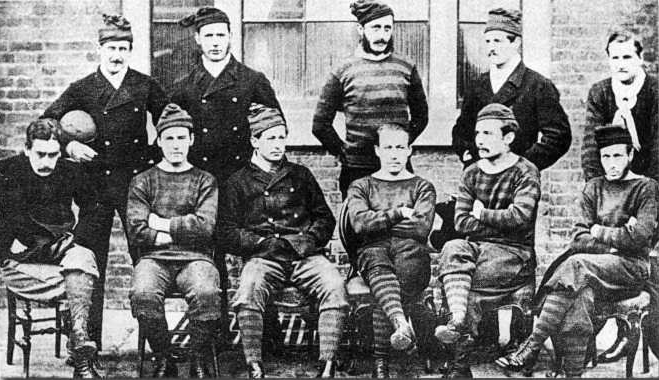
The Royal Engineers: the first passing side. The team that reached the first FA Cup final

=== Royal Engineers in 1868 ===
By early 1868 a contemporary match report states "For the R.E.s Lieuts Campbell, Johnson and Chambers attracted especial attention by their clever play"

=== Royal Engineers in 1869 ===
As early as 1869 the Royal Engineers football club is documented in a contemporary match report as having "worked well together" and "had learned the secret of football success - backing up". In this match failure of the opposite team was attributed to "a painful want of cooperation" against the Engineers.

=== Royal Engineers in 1870 ===
Another contemporary match report clearly shows that by 1870, ball passing was a feature of the Engineers style: "Lieut. Creswell, who having brought it up the side then kicked it into the middle to another of his side, who kicked it through the posts the minute before time was called"

=== Royal Engineers in 1871 ===
Although brief, contemporary match reports confirm that passing was a regular feature of the Engineers' style. For example, in a match of February 1871 against Crystal Palace it is noted that "Lieut. Mitchell made a fine run down the left, passing the ball to Lieut. Rich, who had run up the centre, and who pinched another [goal]" The Engineers used their team playing style with effect against the Wanderers, a side considered as early as 1870 to be the MCC of football. In a match of March 1871 against Wanderers their victory was due to "irreproachable organisation" and in particular that both their attacks and their backing up were both "so well organised" In November 1871 similar passing tactics are described in a contemporary account of a game against the Wanderers in which two goals were scored through tactical passing: "Betts, however, soon seized his opportunity, and by a brilliant run down the left wing turned the ball judiciously to Currie, who as judiciously sent it flying through the strangers' goal in first rate style" Later in the match it is reported that "Lieut. G Barker, turning the ball to Lieut. Renny-Tailyour who planted it between the posts" "Turning" the ball clearly points to the short pass.

=== Royal Engineers in 1872 ===
There is evidence that opponents sometimes adjusted their playing style to counteract the organisation and passing of the Engineers. For example, in February 1872 against Westminster school a brief contemporary match report states that: "The school captain took the precaution of strengthening his backs, deputizing HDS Vidal to cooperate with Rawson and Jackson and so well did these three play in concert... they succeeded in defying the... RE forwards" What is most notable about this report is that it confirms that the Royal Engineers "played beautifully together" That the Engineers were the first side to break the trend of dribbling is shown in a contemporary account of their victory against Crystal Palace in early 1872. This said that: "very little dribbling was displayed"

=== Summary of the Royal Engineers early playing style ===
The evidence above contains detailed descriptions of passing that are lacking in reports of the 1872 Glasgow international. For example, in a lengthy account The Scotsman newspaper makes no mention of passing or combination by the Scottish team and specifically describes the Scottish attacks in terms of dribbling: "The Scotch now came away with a great rush, Leckie and others dribbling the ball so smartly that the English lines were closely besieged and the ball was soon behind" and "Weir now had a splendid run for Scotland into the heart of his opponents' territory." Although the Scottish team are acknowledged to have worked better together during the first half, this contemporary account acknowledges that in the second half England played similarly: "During the first half of the game the English team did not work so well together, but in the second half they left nothing to be desired in this respect." The Scotsman concludes that the difference in styles in the first half is the advantage the Queens' Park players had "through knowing each other's play" as all came from the same club. Unlike the 1872 Glasgow international - which was drawn - the contemporary evidence above shows that the Engineers' team playing style benefited their team play by winning games. Similarly, the 5 March 1872 match between Wanderers and Queen's Park contains no evidence of ball passing.

The early accounts cited above all confirm that the Engineers were the first club to play a passing game of cooperation and organisation with both their forwards and their defence. Although they could also play rough – as would be expected for an army team – The Engineers are the first side to be considered to play the football "beautifully". All of these developments clearly occurred before and independent of the 1872 match between England and Scotland (Queen's Park FC). It is probable that Queen's Park FC observed the Engineers' passing game during one of their visits to England to participate in the 1871–72 FA Cup. Undoubtedly, their representatives in London were well aware of the Sheffield and Engineers' style.

== Queens Park FC, 1867–1882: Pioneers of the Modern Passing Game ==
Within the context of the emerging Association game in Scotland, the late historian and broadcaster Bob Crampsey compared the role of the Queen's Park club with that of the MCC in Cricket and The Royal and Ancient Golf Club in Golf. The Glasgow club's control of the early playing rules in Scotland, early management of the Scotland national team, and instigation of the Scottish Football Association and Scottish Challenge Cup provide evidence of their status as the 'Premier' or 'Senior' club of Scotland. Within this context, the club's development of a scientific form of combination, which would supersede existing playing styles, should be considered.

The most obvious outcome from the successful implementation of a football culture is the creation of a 'legacy'. Due to the club's unceasing commitment to promote the game across Scotland, the Queen's Park playing style quickly became a 'Scottish style'. This playing style was imported into the north and midlands of England during the 1870s and 1880s, by the club itself, by other Scottish clubs, and by an increasing wave of Scottish footballers, who are often referred to by contemporary commentators as 'Scotch Professors', (because of the science of their game). The passing game, as a significant football culture, does not arrive in London until the creation of the London Corinthians in 1882 (in response to Scottish supremacy at international level). Between 1872 and 1887 Scotland would win 10 times and lose only twice against England in the annual internationals. The impact of the Scotch Professors in the midlands and north of England would lead to the legalisation of professionalism in 1885 and the development of league football in 1888.

=== Regular practice and instruction, 1868 – 1872 ===
At a time when matches against other clubs were difficult to arrange, Queen's Park played internal matches dividing up its membership. As Richard Robinson in his early history of the club explains regular practice and instruction, key elements of the combination game, were already being undertaken.

Mondays, Wednesdays and Saturdays were fixed upon as the nights for play…Whoever selected the teams on practising nights had the power to place their men on the field, or appoint substitutes, and the players shall be bound to adhere to their instructions.

Robert Gardner (who captained and picked the Scotland team in the first official international match), as captain of the club, had a profound influence over tactics and team selections. In the match against Hamilton Gymnasium on 29 May 1869 he distributed cards to his team before the match showing each man where he must play. According to Robinson it was the regular practise games that enabled Queen's Park to develop their brand of combination football.

The club... never neglected practice, and this practice was indulged in systematically. Sides were arranged— North v. South of Eglinton Toll, Reds v. Blues, Light v. Heavy Weights, President's Team v. J. Smith's Team (a series of six games), and Clerks v. The Field, etc. In these games the dribbling and passing, which raised the Scottish game to the level of a fine art, were developed. Dribbling was a characteristic of English play, and it was not until very much later that the Southerners came to see that the principles laid down in the Queen's Park method of transference of the ball, accompanied by strong backing up, were those which got the most out of a team. Combination was the chief characteristic of the Queen's Park play.

=== Queen's Park and 2-2-6 formation, 1872 ===
Combination was very much in evidence in both the FA Cup tie against the Wanderers (5 March 1872) and in the international match against England (30 November 1872). In both games the club lined up in a 2-2-6 formation which would be their preferred line up for the remainder of the decade. In the international match Queen's Park organised the game and provided all of the Scotland players from within its own membership. The club would form the backbone of the Scotland national team throughout the 1870s and well into the 1880s. The tactic of combination was certainly successful in combating the superior weight and strength of the opposing players. In the game against Wanderers, the Field magazine wrote of Queen's Park,

They dribble little and usually convey the ball by a series of long kicks, combined with a judicious plan of passing on.

The Herald, in the same game noted that,

The play of the Glasgow 11 was most creditable, as their forwards worked well together, and their backs kicked with great accuracy. On the other hand, the Wanderers dribbled and played skilfully....but collectively they hardly showed so well as their antagonists.

In the first official international match, the first specific reference to a collective passing culture is recorded within the history of Association football. The earliest contemporary reference, dating from 14 December 1872, appears in The Graphic, a weekly illustrated newspaper published in London, and gives clear detail as to the opposing playing styles of the two teams:

Individual skill was generally on England's side, the dribbling of Kirke Smith, Brockbank, and Ottaway being very fine, while Welch, half-back, showed himself a safe and good kick. The Southrons, however, did not play to each other so well as their opponents, who seem to be adepts in passing the ball.

Testament to the combination style of football adopted by Queen's Park in the game is given in an eyewitness account by Walter Arnott, who would himself become a leading player for Queen's Park, Corinthians and Scotland during the 1880s and early 1890s. Arnott gives a clear description of the historic event at which he was present as a spectator. Once again the difference in weight is mentioned,

The English team was by far the heavier one. Their forwards played an individual game, and were much faster than those on the Scottish side, whose forward work was done in pairs. What a treat it was to see Clegg or Ottaway getting their ball near their own goal, and making off at a great pace down the field, and only being robbed of it by someone in the last line of the Scottish defence! Then, again, to watch the great Jamie Weir – the prince of dribblers – and his partner, by splendid combined play rushing down the wing and centring the ball with great accuracy right into the goal-mouth.

It would appear that the Queen's Park players, unable to match their opponents individually for strength, paired up to stop the dribbling runs of the England players when defending their own goal and played short passes on the run when attacking their opponent's goal. References alluding to the fact that the Scotland players 'worked from first to last well together, through knowing each other's play' can be found in the Scotsman. while the Glasgow Herald comments that, "The strong point of the home club was that they played excellently well together."

=== Creating a Scottish style ===
Queen's Park took their brand of football to other parts of Scotland, arranging exhibition matches in Dunbartonshire, Edinburgh and Dundee. The game that they promoted was quite different from the 'backing up' style of the Royal Engineers and the 'passing on' game of Sheffield. In a match against Vale of Leven, played in February 1873, the Glasgow club's systematic form of passing is highlighted in the match report,

Shortly before time was called the Queen's Park came away in fine style, and drove their opponents before them - Messrs Gardner, Leckie, Wotherspoon, Taylor and M'Kinnon working beautifully to each other's feet.

Their passing game became a Scottish style which was distinctive from other parts of the UK. An early example of other Scottish clubs emulating the passing style and 2-2-6 formation of Queen's Park can be found in January 1874. The Glasgow Herald's report on the match between the 3rd Lanark and Western clubs states,

On ends being changed, the 3rd men, who were smarting from the unexpected turn of luck, very soon got to work in earnest, and M'Neil, taking the ball in tow up his side of the ground, passed it beautifully to Dick, who was in waiting and who in turn passed it very judiciously to Miller, who kicked a very pretty goal. No better sample of the passing game could be desired than that shown in the taking of this goal; and as in this case, when combined with good dribbling, it has a telling effect and ought to be the principle study of all Association players.

=== Dribbling and Passing ===
The argument contained within the Royal Engineers section which opposes the Scottish view of the first international match focuses on the contemporary Scotsman newspaper article which gives reference to Scottish players dribbling the ball. The Scottish argument, however, contends that the playing style of the Queen's Park players, throughout the 1870s, accommodated both dribbling and passing. The evidence is certainly plentiful. This can be seen in The Graphic newspaper article which on the one hand refers to the Scottish team as being adept at passing the ball but on the other also presents evidence of Scottish players dribbling the ball,

Let it suffice to say that Ker (Scotland) closed the match by the most brilliant run of the day, dribbling the ball past the whole field close on the English lines before he was stopped...

In short, the playing tactics of Queen's Park FC allowed for the ball to be passed when possession was about to be lost or when a greater advantage could be attained; the dribble forward was augmented with a short pass to a teammate.

Writing in the Football Annual in 1883, Charles W. Alcock observed that,

It has been the combination of dribbling and passing that has made the Queen's Park and other Scotch elevens such splendid teams.

Tellingly C.W. Alcock, the FA's most influential administrator during the 1860s and 1870s, makes no reference in any of his numerous articles to the role of the Royal Engineers in developing a passing game. This confirms that the backing up system of the Engineers did not involve systematic passing.

In contrast to this, the newspaper article which features Queen's Park's victory over Wanderers in October 1875 (a match in which C.W. Alcock and the Anglo Scot A.F. Kinnaird played in for Wanderers) gives a concise description of the style of combination adopted by the club, particularly in the section which describes the second and third goals,

After a "hand" within thirty yards of the Wanderers' lines, Weir got possession, and, successfully charging the English forwards, passed it on to Herriot, who in turn placed it to Campbell, who by a well judged kick dropped the ball just below the bar, thus securing another goal for the Scotsmen in sixteen minutes. No sooner had the English captain started the ball than Herriot, Weir and Lawrie, by neat passing sent it back, and after the backs and half backs had shown good play, the two M'Neills brought it along the left side, and passing it to Lawrie, the latter made a shot for goal, but the ball passed just outside the goal post. The play was now in the centre, the Queen’s Park men dribbling and passing, while their opponents indulged chiefly in heavy kicking. In 33 minutes from the commencement of operations H. M'Neill, obtaining possession, kicked the ball to Herriot, who unselfishly serving it to Lawrie, the latter again made a shot for goal, this time with more success, as the ball, passing above the goalkeeper’s head, went clean through thus obtaining the third goal.

=== The passing game and Scottish supremacy ===
In the south east of England as the coordinated system of 'backing up' began to decline, the systematic passing game of Queen's Park would eventually win through. It was England's 5–1 defeat in 1882 to a Scotland team featuring seven Queen's Park players which led to Nicholas Lane Jackson, a prominent member of the FA, creating the famous Corinthians team. This direct reaction to the success of Queen's Park and the Scotland national team is quoted in the book Corinthians and Cricketers,

It would not be wrong to claim for Queen's Park the building of Scottish football almost single-handed.... It has wielded a profound influence in fashioning the technique of the game, and its development of scientific passing and cohesion between the half-backs and the forwards as a counter to the traditional dribbling and individuality...During those barren years England's teams consisted of amateur players from many different clubs...who had to combine their individuality without any pre-match knowledge of each other's play...Not surprisingly, England failed to beat an enemy nurtured on scientific combination. This position might have continued much longer until the flood tide of professionalism had its inevitable effect; but one of the most industrious and enthusiastic of the game's earliest legislators, N. Lane ('Pa') Jackson, who was then honorary assistant secretary of The Football Association, sought a more immediate solution. 'At that period', he has recorded for us in his autobiography, Sporting Days and Sporting Ways, 'public school and university men provided most of the players for the English side, so I thought that by giving them plenty of practice together they would acquire a certain measure of combination.

The rudimentary 'passing on' game of Sheffield could not compete with the scientific short passing style championed by Queen's Park and at representative level the Glasgow FA would experience 14 wins and only one defeat against the Sheffield FA in the 17 fixtures played between 1874 and 1890. A good example of the difference in playing styles is cited in the Scottish Football Annual of 1877/78 which gives the following comments on the Glasgow v Sheffield match of 1877,

That the game was a very well contested one, and victory has rested with the best side, no one will deny; but that it was a pretty game, abounding in fine displays of combined dribbling, which has frequently distinguished a Scottish team above all others, few will admit…The fact cannot be hidden…that the tactics pursued by the Sheffield team on Saturday were partially responsible for this inasmuch as they play a different set of rules from those of the English and Scottish Associations, and to them our "off-side" rule is next to a dead letter. In this manner, long kicking was largely indulged in on Saturday on their side; and in order to meet the same style of play, the Glasgow men actually lost that united action which had led them on to victory in many a harder fought field.

=== Legacy of the Scottish combination game ===
Queen's Park's combination game, which had emerged as a general 'Scottish style' due to the club's high standing and her energetic promotion of the game, would spread south of the border, to the north and midlands of England, through the efforts of the club and with the arrival of the Scotch Professors. William McGregor, the Father of the Football League and president of Aston Villa FC, pays the following tribute,

...their missionary visits to the Midlands and Lancashire did much to create a true love for Association football in those districts and also to give a tone and polish to local football effort. They were the first club to introduce really scientific methods into the game. Their football was as perfect and polished as football has ever been played at a time when most clubs were content with merely scrambling after the ball...

Teams throughout England, from Sunderland (the team of all the talents), Preston North End (Invincibles), Liverpool F.C. (the team of the Macs), Bolton Wanderers, Sheffield Wednesday and Blackburn Rovers in the north, to Aston Villa and Derby County in the Midlands, and Arsenal, Fulham and Southampton in the South were greatly influenced by the Scottish style through the importation of Scotch Professors, trained in the Queen's Park style. British administrators and coaches would take the Scottish short passing game overseas. These include Jimmy Hogan, John Cameron, Jock Hamilton, Fred Pentland, Alexander Watson Hutton, John Harley and John Dick.

The wealthy miner Samuel Tyzack, who alongside and shipbuilder Robert Turnbull funded the Sunderland A.F.C. "team of all talents," often pretended to be a priest while scouting for players in Scotland, as Sunderland's recruitment policy in Scotland enraged many Scottish fans. In fact, the whole Sunderland lineup in the 1895 World Championship was made from entirely Scottish players.

Sunderland striker, the Scot John Campbell, became league top scorer three times, in all of which Sunderland won the league. Important to his success in attack were other "Team of All Talents" players from Scotland: Jimmy Hannah and Jimmy Millar. Their goalkeeper Ned Doig set a 19th-century world record by not conceding any goals in 87 of his 290 top division appearances (30%).

Preston North End, the first English team to win the Championship and Cup "double", did so with a majority of their team being made up of Scottish players. In the first season, they went undefeated both in the league and the FA Cup, which led to them being known as "the invincibles."

== Cambridge University AFC: Pioneers of the modern tactical game (early 1880s) ==
See also Cambridge University AFC Parkers Piece

In a detailed investigation into the evolution of football tactics based upon contemporary accounts, Adrian Harvey of the University of London refers to the teams responsible for the early development of the passing game (including Sheffield, The Royal Engineers and "the short passes beloved of [Scotland's] Queens Park") but comes to the following conclusion about the finished, modern team product:

"Curiously, the side that was generally credited with transforming the tactics of association football and almost single-handedly inventing the modern game was not a professional team but the Cambridge University XI of 1882. Contemporaries described Cambridge as being the first "combination" team in which each player was allotted an area of the field and played as part of a team in a game that was based upon passing"

In an 1891 discussion by CW Alcock on the history of a "definite scheme of attack" and "elaborate combination" in early football playing styles (including references to "Northern" teams, including Queens Park), Alcock states: "The perfection of the system which is in vogue at the present time however is in a very great measure the creation of the last few years. The Cambridge University eleven of 1883 were the first to illustrate the full possibilities of a systematic combination giving full scope to the defence as well as the attack" The 1883 Cambridge University side was the first team to introduce the "pyramid" 2 3 5 formation (two defenders, three midfield, and five strikers). Following the success of the "Cambridge pyramid" this formation became the norm for all football teams.

Alcock goes onto say: "It was about this time [1883] that the third half back came to be recognized as a necessity of the new formation, and though the Scotch players were slow to acknowledge an innovation emanating from England, which forms the keystone of the formation of to-day"

The key role played by Cambridge University AFC in developing the modern game of football is also supported by the football historian Sir Montague Shearman.

Combination by Cambridge University FC is suggested in contemporary accounts as early as December 1872: "The goal for the university was the result of the combined efforts of Adams, Sparham and Smith". In this account Cambridge "played well together".

== Other early passing sides ==
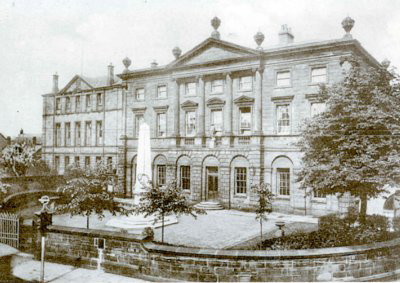
Derby School at St Helen's House

Combination play is also reported from other English sides, for example Derby School against Nottingham Forest, where a double pass is reported, the first of which is irrefutably a short pass. In this March 1872 match: "Mr Absey dribbling the ball half the length of the field delivered it to Wallis, who kicking it cleverly in front of the goal, sent it to the captain who drove it at once between the Nottingham posts" Other early passing sides include the Shropshire Wanderers in the 1875/76 season Nottingham Forest themselves also provide early evidence of passing, for example in February 1872 "Mr Widowson ...several times ...crossed it to their front player. Certain Lancashire sides (for example Blackburn Olympic) have also been considered to be innovators of the early passing game. "Systematic play" was part of other sides, for example Trent College in April 1872

Possibly the most important passing manoeuvre in the early history of the game was the pass from Reverend Vidal ("the prince of the dribblers") to M.P. Betts who then scored the only goal in the first ever FA cup final in March 1872. The report in the Field of this match suggests combination: this was 'the fastest and hardest match that has ever been seen at The Oval ... some of the best play on their [Wanderers] part, individually and collectively, that has ever been shown in an Association game."

The Corinthians F.C. are also credited with bringing into being the modern passing football game, for example by Sir Frederick Wall. This is likely to have been due to the influence of the Cambridge team on the Corinthians' playing style.
