= 1872 FA Cup final =

English association football match

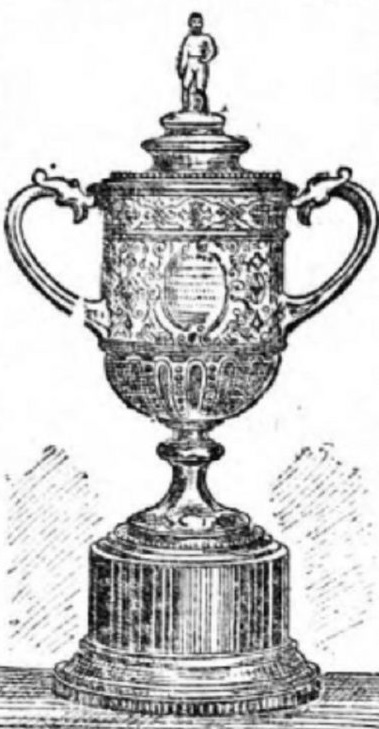
- An illustration of the FA Cup trophy awarded in 1872
- Event: 1871–72 FA Cup
Wanderers	Royal Engineers
1	0
- Date: 16 March 1872
- Venue: Kennington Oval, London
- Referee: Alfred Stair
- Attendance: 2,000

The 1872 FA Cup final was an association football match between Wanderers and Royal Engineers on 16 March 1872 at Kennington Oval in London. It was the final of the first staging of the Football Association Challenge Cup (known in the modern era as the FA Cup), which became the primary cup competition in English football and the oldest football competition in the world. Fifteen teams entered the competition in its first season and, due to the rules in place at the time, Wanderers reached the final having won only one match in the four preceding rounds. In the semi-finals, they drew with the Scottish club Queen's Park, but reached the final when the Scots withdrew from the competition as they could not afford to return to London for a replay.

The final was decided by a single goal, scored after fifteen minutes by Morton Betts of Wanderers, who was playing under the pseudonym "A. H. Chequer". Royal Engineers were noted for their innovative use of passing, then referred to as the "Combination Game", at a time when most teams relied almost solely on dribbling tactics. Despite this, they could not manage to score a goal. The winning Wanderers team received the trophy the following month, when it was presented to them at the club's annual dinner at the Pall Mall Restaurant.

== Background ==
The Football Association Challenge Cup (commonly known in the modern era as the FA Cup) was the first formal competition created for the sport of association football, which had first been codified in England in 1863. The Football Association (the FA) had been created in an attempt to formalise a standard set of rules for football, as no universally agreed rules for the sport existed; many clubs adopted what came to be known as association football, but others continued to use differing rules. The creation of the cup tournament was proposed in 1871 by Charles W. Alcock, the secretary of the FA, who wrote that "it is desirable that a Challenge Cup should be established in connection with the Association, for which all clubs belonging to the Association should be invited to compete". His inspiration had been a similar competition between houses during his time as a pupil at Harrow School.

The first FA Cup competition took place during the 1871–72 football season. Although fifty clubs were members of the FA, only twelve opted to take part and three of these quickly withdrew; a further six clubs then decided to enter, taking the total number of entrants to fifteen. Some clubs declined to enter because they had already arranged a full season of matches and did not wish to cancel any, while others felt that competing for a prize was not in keeping with the amateur ethos of the sport. The clubs taking part were mostly based in London and the surrounding area, but also included the leading team in Scotland, Queen's Park. The players involved were drawn from the upper classes; the members of the Wanderers club were wealthy gentlemen who had attended some of the leading English public schools, including Harrow and Eton College, and the Royal Engineers team consisted of officers from the Corps of Royal Engineers, a division of the British Army.

== Route to the final ==
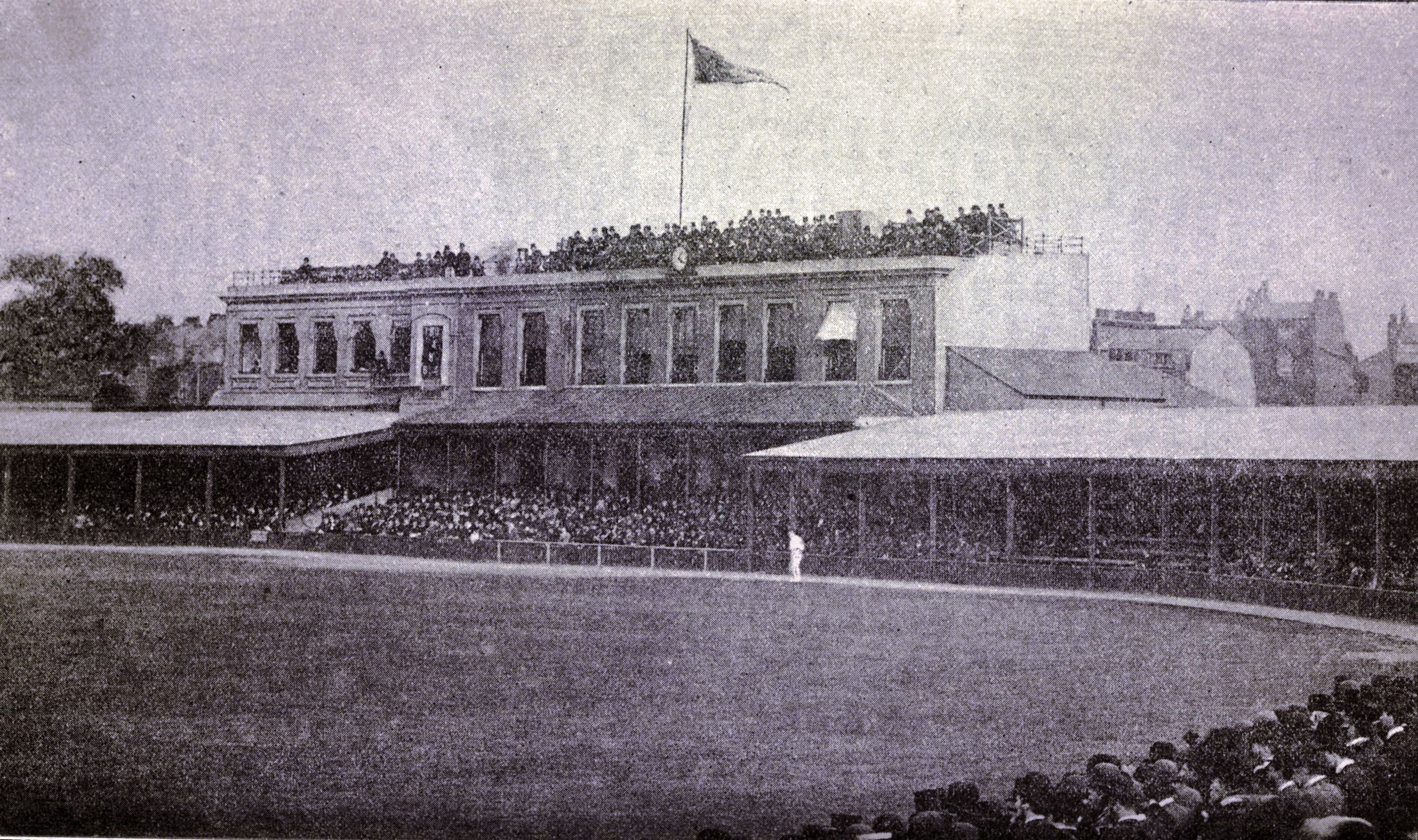
Both semi-finals took place at London's Kennington Oval (pictured in 1891).

The random draw for the first round paired Wanderers with Harrow Chequers, a team consisting of former pupils of Harrow School, and Royal Engineers with Reigate Priory. Neither match took place, as both the Chequers and Reigate withdrew from the competition, sending their opponents through to the next round on a walkover. In the second round, Wanderers defeated Clapham Rovers 1–0 in December in a match which ended in near darkness after the start was delayed due to the late arrival of a number of players; the following month, Royal Engineers won 5–0 at London's Kennington Oval against Hitchin, who could only muster eight players.

At the quarter-final stage, Wanderers drew 0–0 with Crystal Palace.^{[a]} Rather than be made to replay the match, both teams were permitted to go through to the semi-finals under one of the competition's original rules, which stated that in the event of a drawn match, the teams would either be made to play again or both progress to the next round at the organising committee's discretion. Royal Engineers beat Hampstead Heathens 2–0.

In the semi-finals, Wanderers took on Queen's Park who, due to a combination of walkovers and byes, had reached this stage of the competition without actually playing a match. The rules of the competition stated that all matches from the semi-final stage onwards would take place at Kennington Oval and, after being held to a 0–0 draw, the Scottish club could not afford to make the lengthy trip from Glasgow a second time for a replay and withdrew from the competition, sending Wanderers into the final. An article published in Bell's Life in London after the final criticised the requirement for teams from so far afield to have to repeatedly travel to the capital, which put them at a severe disadvantage against London-based clubs. Wanderers thus reached the final having won only one match and scored only one goal in the four preceding rounds. The second semi-final, between Royal Engineers and Crystal Palace, also finished goalless; the military team won 3–0 in a replay.

== Match ==
=== Pre-match and personnel ===
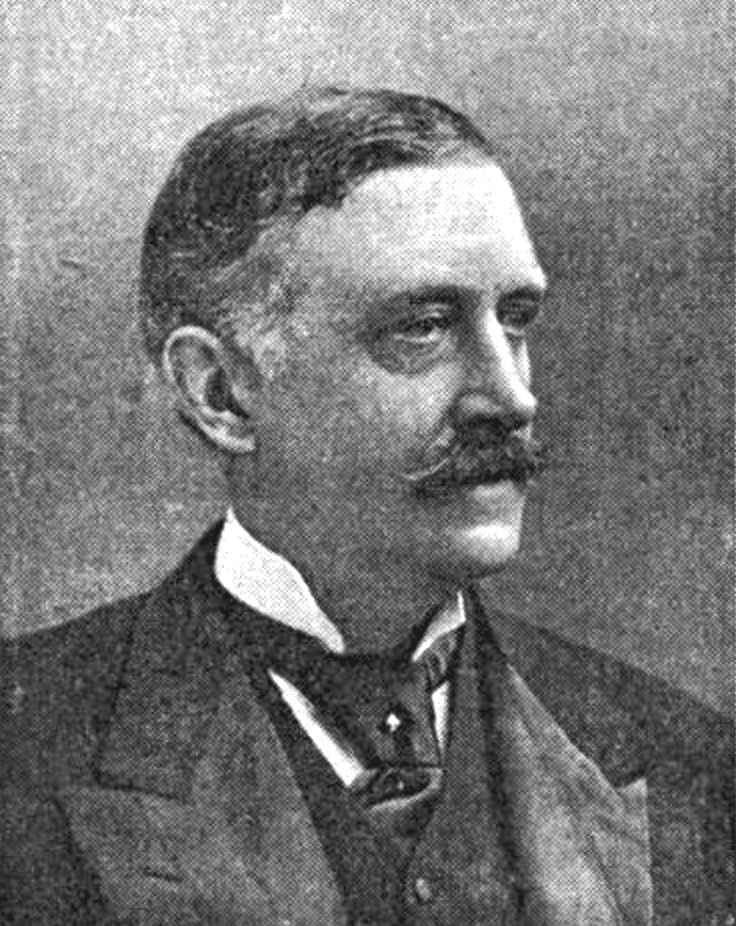
Francis Marindin captained the Royal Engineers team.

The final took place at Kennington Oval on 16 March. Previewing the game, The Morning Post described the Wanderers team as "the crème de la crème of the Association players" and noted that in the earlier rounds of the competition, some of their best players had been unavailable, but that they were expected to be at full strength for the final. The writer also commented on Royal Engineers' preferred tactics of passing the ball between players, a style then known as the "Combination Game" and considered innovative; most teams at the time relied on players making long runs dribbling the ball until they found themselves in potential goalscoring positions or were dispossessed by an opponent. The Field wrote that "the general feeling [...] seemed to be in favour of a victory for the Sappers", using a traditional nickname of the Corps of Royal Engineers.

Alcock, the man who had proposed the creation of the tournament, was the captain of the Wanderers team and Francis Marindin captained their opponents. Morton Betts of Wanderers played under the pseudonym "A. H. Chequer", referencing his membership of the Harrow Chequers club. Some modern sources assert that he played under an assumed name to disguise the fact that he was cup-tied, having been a registered player of the Chequers club at the start of the competition and therefore ineligible to play for any other club in that season's cup. This seems to be untrue, however; while the competition's original rules stated that a player could not compete for more than one team in a given season's competition, Betts had not actually represented Harrow Chequers in the cup as the team withdrew without playing a match. The rule also seems to have been generally disregarded; Cuthbert Ottaway had played for two different clubs in earlier rounds of the competition without apparent incident.

The Morning Post wrote that "a vast number of spectators" were present at the final, and The Field described the attendance as "much above average", despite the fact that the game clashed with public trials for the upcoming Oxford–Cambridge Boat Race. In contrast, Bell's Life in London stated that there were "not a great number of visitors" and blamed the decision to charge an admission fee of one shilling. Modern sources give an attendance figure of 2,000. The umpires were J. H. Giffard for Royal Engineers and James Kirkpatrick for Wanderers, and Alfred Stair, the assistant honorary secretary of the FA, was the referee. At the time, the umpires had the primary responsibility for enforcing the Laws of the Game during a match and the referee's role was to resolve disputes if the umpires could not agree.

=== Match summary ===
As was common at the time, both teams focused mainly on attack rather than defence; Royal Engineers lined up with seven forwards and Wanderers with eight. Alcock won the coin toss and chose to begin the game defending the goal at the western end of the ground, meaning that the military team initially had the wind and sun in their faces. Royal Engineers were quickly hard-pressed by their opponents' attacking play and Wanderers dominated the early part of the game, surprising onlookers with a greater degree of combination play than was their norm. Ten minutes after the kick-off, a melee took place and Edmund Creswell of Royal Engineers suffered a broken collarbone. He refused to leave the pitch, but due to his injury, was moved to a wing position where he would have less involvement in play.^{[b]} Wanderers took the lead fifteen minutes into the game when Walpole Vidal made a long dribbling run before passing the ball to Betts, who, according to The Field, "was able to effect the reduction of the military goal with but little difficulty". Under the rules in use at the time, the teams changed ends after the goal, but the military team were unable to take advantage of the fact that the sun and wind were now behind them, and Wanderers remained dominant. After twenty minutes Alcock put the ball past Royal Engineers' goalkeeper, William Merriman, but the goal was disallowed because Charles Wollaston had handled the ball in the build-up.

Herbert Muirhead had the best chance for Royal Engineers, making a run close to their opponents' goal before being blocked by Albert Thompson. Wanderers continued to exert further pressure and only the skill of Merriman was able to prevent his opponents from increasing their lead; The Field wrote that "so resolute was the front offered by Capt. Merriman [...] and so judicious his defence that further reverses were averted". The newspaper described his overall performance as "perfect". A shot from a Wanderers player hit one of the goalposts following "a protracted bully [which] raged on the very edge of the Engineers' lines", in the words of The Sportsman. Despite a late rally from their opponents, Wanderers held their lead and the game ended in a 1–0 victory. The reporter for The Field called the final "the fastest and hardest match that has ever been seen at The Oval" and said that the victors displayed "some of the best play, individually and collectively, that has ever been shown in an Association game". The Morning Post described the match as one-sided and said that the soldiers "could never get within many yards of their opponents' quarters", and The Sportsman commented that they "only on two occasions endangered the enemy's goal".

=== Details ===
16 March 1872
15:05

Wanderers	1–0	Royal Engineers
Betts 15'

Kennington Oval, London
Attendance: 2,000
Referee: Alfred Stair

Wanderers	Royal Engineers

Wanderers:
GK	Reginald Courtenay Welch
FB	Edgar Lubbock
HB	Albert Thompson
FW	Charles W. Alcock
FW	Edward Bowen
FW	Alexander Bonsor
FW	Morton Betts
FW	William Crake
FW	Thomas Hooman
FW	Walpole Vidal
FW	Charles Wollaston

Royal Engineers:
GK	Capt. William Merriman
FB	Capt. Francis Marindin
FB	Lieut. George Addison
HB	Lieut. Alfred Goodwyn
FW	Lieut. Hugh Mitchell
FW	Lieut. Edmund Creswell
FW	Lieut. Henry Renny-Tailyour
FW	Lieut. Henry Rich
FW	Lieut. Herbert Muirhead
FW	Lieut. Edmond Cotter
FW	Lieut. Adam Bogle

Umpires:

- J. H. Giffard (Royal Engineers)
- J. Kirkpatrick (Wanderers)

== Post-match ==
The trophy was presented by the President of the Football Association, Ebenezer Morley, at the annual dinner of the Wanderers club at the Pall Mall Restaurant in London, on 11 April. The Football Association also gave each player in the winning team a silk badge commemorating the victory and the club's committee presented each player with an inscribed gold medal. As cup-holders, Wanderers received a bye straight to the final of the following year's FA Cup, in keeping with the original concept of the competition being a "challenge cup"; this was the only time this rule was used. The FA Cup continues to be contested each season and is the oldest association football competition in the world. Even after the advent of professional league football in England in 1888, winning the FA Cup was for decades seen as an equal achievement to winning the league championship; the growing importance of the Premier League and UEFA Champions League has seen its prestige diminish.

In 1938, several newspapers published obituaries for Thomas Hooman which stated that he had scored the winning goal in the 1872 cup final. This is not backed up by contemporary newspaper reports, all of which list Betts as the goalscorer. The obituaries contain other information about the match which Hooman had "told a reporter some time ago", such as the claim that it was played without a referee or umpires; as these claims are demonstrably false, it is likely that the statement that he scored the goal was also based on his reminiscences and that so many years after the fact he was confusing the 1872 final with another match in which he played.

In 2010, the only known surviving medal from the final was offered for sale at an auction in London. It had been purchased by a jeweller as part of a house clearance in the 1950s and was expected to sell for up to £50,000, but was ultimately purchased by the Professional Footballers' Association for £70,500. A revived version of the Wanderers club was formed in London in 2009, reportedly with the approval of the descendants of players from the Victorian era; this team played a Royal Engineers side at the Oval in 2012 to mark the 140th anniversary of the first FA Cup final.

== Footnotes ==
a. This Crystal Palace club is not generally regarded as being the same as the modern club of the same name. In 2020, the modern club, which had long been regarded as having been formed in 1905, began asserting that it was a direct continuation of the team which existed in the 1870s based on new research by club historians, but this was disputed by other football researchers and rejected by the English football authorities.
b. The concept of substitutes was not introduced to English football until the 1960s; previously, an injured player had to play on or else the team had to continue with a reduced number of players.
