= Henry Bayard Rich =

British Army officer and association football player (1849–1884)

- Born: 14 June 1849; Berbice, British Guiana
- Died: 17 November 1884 (aged 35); Rawalpindi, British India
- Spouse: Ada Melvill Simons
- Parent(s): Frederick Henry Rich; Elizabeth Bayard

Capt. Henry Bayard Rich (14 June 1849 – 17 November 1884) was a British soldier, who played for the Royal Engineers in the 1872 FA Cup Final. As a soldier, he saw active service in three campaigns: the Perak Expedition of 1875–76, the Zulu War of 1879 and the Egyptian Expedition of 1882. He was killed in an accident while playing polo.

== Family and early life ==
Rich was born in Berbice, British Guiana, the first child of Col. Frederick Henry Rich (1824–1904) and his wife Elizabeth née Bayard (1826–1885). His father became a colonel in the Royal Engineers and was the Chief Inspecting Officer of the Railway Inspectorate between 1885 and 1889. His mother was the daughter of Richard Henry Bayard, US Senator and Chief Justice of Delaware.

Rich was educated at Marlborough College between April 1864 and Christmas 1866. He was then trained at the Royal Military Academy, Woolwich between 1867 and 1870.

== Football career ==
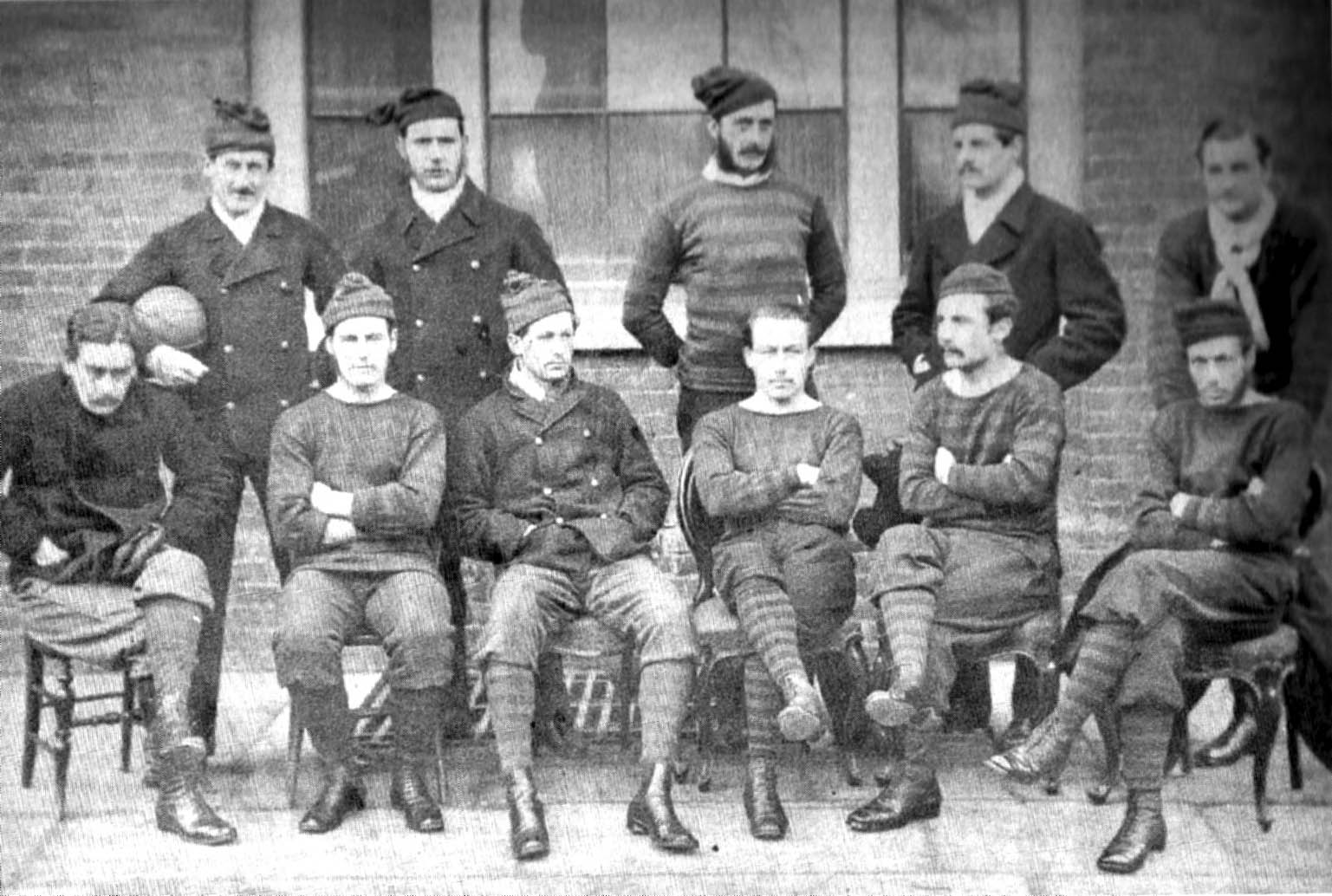
The Royal Engineers team of 1872. Rich is seated on the right

Rich played football for Marlborough College and RMA, Woolwich before joining the Royal Engineers. He generally played as a forward and was "ranked as one of the best football players of his day" who "strove hard to pass the backs".

In November 1871, the Royal Engineers were among fifteen teams who entered the inaugural FA Cup competition; after victories over Hitchin (5–0), Hampstead Heathens (3–0) and Crystal Palace (3–0 after a replay), the Engineers met Wanderers, the top amateur club of the day, in the first FA Cup Final, played at Kennington Oval on 16 March 1872, which the Engineers lost 1–0, to a goal from Morton Betts.

As well as being a footballer, Rich was an athlete who was reputed to be "one of the fastest runners on the athletic track" during his cadetship and later became one of the best horse riders in the Royal Engineers.

== Military career ==
Rich graduated from RMA Woolwich and joined the Royal Engineers as a lieutenant on 8 January 1870. Fellow graduates on the same day were two of his fellow FA Cup finalists, Hugh Mitchell and Edmund Creswell. Rich was promoted to captain twelve years later.

He was based at Chatham until July 1872, before spending eight months at Aldershot. In April 1873, he was posted to Hong Kong until December 1875 when he was sent to Perak as part of a force sent to end local resistance following the murder of the British administrator James W.W. Birch in November 1875. He was mentioned in dispatches by Col. J. Y. Moggridge and awarded the Indian Medal with clasp for the Perak Expedition. Rich returned to Hong Kong in March 1876 and then back to Aldershot in August.

In April 1879, he was posted to South Africa where he served in the Zulu War with the Telegraph Troop in charge of the signallers with the First Division, for which he received the South Africa Medal with 1879 clasp. In January 1880, he returned to England, serving at Chatham, Curragh (Ireland) and at Colchester.

He returned to active service when he was sent to Egypt in September 1882 as part of the Egyptian Expedition to put down a nationalist uprising against the Khedive Tewfik Pasha, where he was employed with the "A" troop under Sir Garnet Wolseley. Rich was awarded the Egypt Medal with a bronze star given by the Khedive. In October 1882, he returned to Aldershot before being posted to India in September 1883.

== Marriage ==
Rich married Ada Melvill Simons (1859–1915) at Sydenham Hill, London on 3 May 1881. The couple had no children.

Following Rich's death, his widow remarried, to Major Francis Slater Picot (1859–1939), of the Wiltshire Regiment. Their son, Capt. Philip Simons Picot served with the Sherwood Foresters (Nottinghamshire and Derbyshire Regiment) and was killed at Gallipoli on 11 July 1915.

== Death ==
Rich was killed at Rawalpindi on 17 November 1884, aged 35, as the result of an accident while playing polo. He and another officer collided violently and Rich was flung to the ground, suffering a fractured skull.

== Bibliography ==
- Collett, Mike (2003). The Complete Record of the FA Cup. Sports Books. ISBN 1-899807-19-5.
- Gibbons, Philip (2001). Association Football in Victorian England – A History of the Game from 1863 to 1900. Upfront Publishing. ISBN 1-84426-035-6.
- Warsop, Keith (2004). The Early F.A. Cup Finals and the Southern Amateurs. Soccer Data. ISBN 1-899468-78-1.
