= Crake (surname) =

Crake is an English surname. People with this surname include:

- Augustine David Crake (1836–1890), English cleric and author known for devotional works and juvenile historical fiction
- Francis Crake (1893–1920), British Army and Royal Irish Constabulary officer
- Paul Crake (born 1976), Australian racing cyclist
- Ralph Crake (1882–1952), Scottish first-class cricketer and British Army officer
- William Crake (1852–1921), English footballer

== See also ==
- Joe Crakes (1907–1976), American National Football League player and US Air Force officer
