= Edmund Creswell =

British Army officer and footballer (1849–1931)

Col. Edmund William Creswell (7 November 1849 – 1 May 1931) was a British soldier, who played for the Royal Engineers in the 1872 FA Cup Final. As a soldier, he was engaged mainly in administrative work and never saw active service.

== Family and education ==
Creswell was born in Gibraltar on 7 November 1849, the son of Edmund Creswell (1800–1877) and his wife Mary Margaret née Fraser (1826–1892). His father had been appointed postmaster of the colony of Gibraltar in 1831; in 1857, he secured funding from London for building a new post office, and amalgamated the two previous postal services, thus founding the Royal Gibraltar Post Office.

Creswell was educated at Bruce Castle School, Tottenham, London followed by the Royal Military Academy, Woolwich (RMA) until 1870.

Creswell's brother William (1852–1933) became a vice-admiral and is known as the "father" of the Royal Australian Navy. Another brother, Frederic (1866–1948) was a Labour Party politician in South Africa, who was Minister of Defence from 1924 to 1933. A sister, Mary Catherine (1857–1892) married one of Creswell's teammates from the 1872 FA Cup Final, Hugh Mitchell in 1878.

== Football career ==
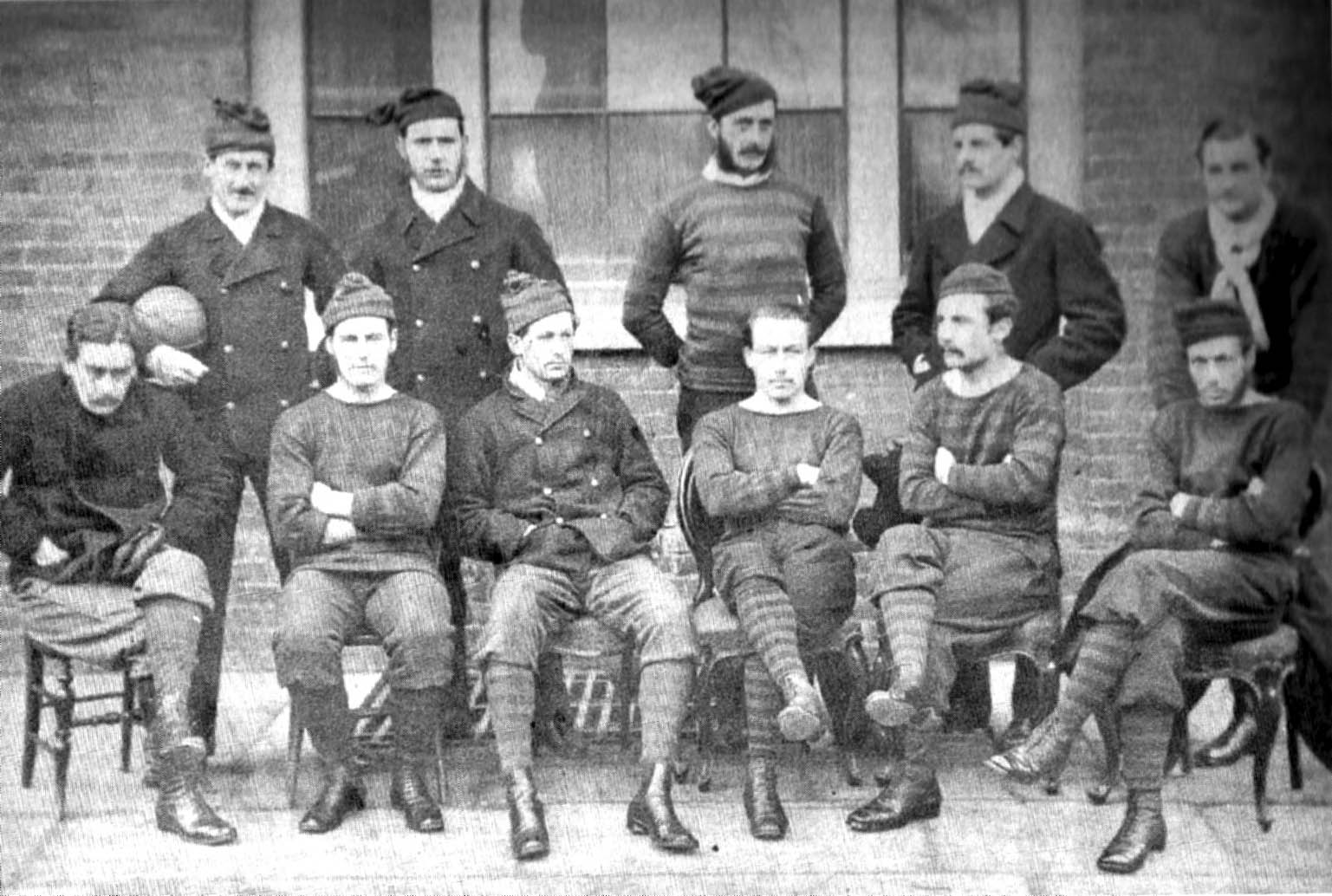
The Royal Engineers team of 1872. Eight of these players played in the first FA Cup Final. Creswell is seated third from the left

Creswell represented Bruce Castle School and the RMA at football. He was Secretary of the Royal Engineers Association Football Club, which, in November 1871, was among fifteen teams who entered the inaugural FA Cup competition, and were allocated a home match in the first round against Reigate Priory. Reigate Priory, however, withdrew from the competition, sending the Engineers through to the next round on a walkover. In the second round, the Engineers beat Hitchin 5–0 on 10 January 1872. At the quarter-final stage, the Engineers beat Hampstead Heathens 3–0, setting up a semi-final against Crystal Palace which was won 3–0 after a replay.

The first FA Cup Final was played at Kennington Oval on 16 March 1872 between the Royal Engineers and Wanderers, the top amateur club of the day. Ten minutes into the match, Creswell was seriously injured, breaking a collar-bone in a charge on goal. Despite suffering tremendous pain, he refused to leave the pitch and played the remainder of the match out of the action as a "passenger" on the wing. Wanderers took the lead fifteen minutes into the game when Morton Betts opened the scoring from an acute angle after Robert Vidal's long dribble. Wanderers continued to exert further pressure on the Engineers' goal and, despite a late rally from the Engineers, Wanderers were able to hold on to their lead and the game ended in a 1–0 victory in their favour. In its report on the match, The Sportsman commented: "Too much praise cannot be accorded to him for the pluck he showed in maintaining his post, although completely disabled and in severe pain, until the finish".

Although Creswell's football career was short, he remained an active sportsman for a long period. He played cricket for the Royal Engineers and other clubs, including the Gentlemen of Hampshire, between 1868 and 1886.

== Military career ==
Creswell graduated from the Royal Military Academy, Woolwich on 8 January 1870, joining the Royal Engineers with the rank of lieutenant. Fellow graduates on the same day were two of his fellow FA Cup finalists, Hugh Mitchell and Henry Rich. Creswell was promoted to captain twelve years later and was further promoted to major on 1 August 1888 and to lieutenant-colonel on 12 August 1895, becoming a full colonel on 12 August 1899.

During his service with the Royal Engineers, Creswell was engaged mainly in administrative work and never saw active service. Between January 1870 and August 1872, he was based at Chatham, before going to India on 23 October 1872 where he worked as an assistant engineer until he returned to Chatham in February 1880. Between 1 April 1881 and 31 March 1888, he was seconded to the Ordnance Survey before going to South Africa on 19 April 1888. He returned to England on 18 November 1892 and was then based at Liverpool until 3 June 1894, when he was transferred to Shoeburyness in Essex. On 12 January 1897, he returned to India, where he remained until he retired from the army on 12 August 1900.

== Wives and children ==
On 30 January 1875, he married Emma Mary Carver (1853–1899) at Byculla, Bombay, India. The couple had nine children, including a son Edmund Fraser Creswell (1876–1941), who became a colonel in the Royal Artillery. Awarded the Distinguished Service Order in World War One, he worked for the Ammunition Department of the Ministry of Supply in the Second World War, and died following an accident on 5 November 1941.

Following the death of Emma on 11 May 1899, Edmund Creswell married Isabel Agnes Vulliamy (1869–1956) from Paris, in St Marylebone, London on 19 October 1907. Their only child was Sir Michael Justin Creswell (1909–1986) who was the UK Ambassador to Finland, from 1954 to 1958, Yugoslavia from 1960 to 1964, and Argentina from 1964 to 1969. Michael's son, Alexander is a renowned architectural artist.

Edmund Creswell died at Copse Hill, Ewhurst, Surrey on 1 May 1931.

== Bibliography ==
- Collett, Mike (2003). The Complete Record of the FA Cup. Sports Books. ISBN 1-899807-19-5.
- Gibbons, Philip (2001). Association Football in Victorian England – A History of the Game from 1863 to 1900. Upfront Publishing. ISBN 1-84426-035-6.
- Warsop, Keith (2004). The Early F.A. Cup Finals and the Southern Amateurs. Soccer Data. ISBN 1-899468-78-1.
