= Percy Weston =

English sportsperson (1852–1905)

Percy Weston (27 March 1852 – 30 June 1905) was an English amateur athlete who played for England in two of the unofficial football matches against Scotland in 1871 and 1872. In his professional life, he was a successful stockbroker.

== Early life ==
Weston was born in Hackney, London, on 27 March 1852, the fourth son of John Weston (1817–1887) and his wife Augusta Ellen née Wood (1817–1891). His father was a merchant and financial agent.

== Rowing ==
Percy and his four brothers were members of the London Rowing Club; being small in stature, they made perfect coxes. Between 1865 and 1871, Percy won several prizes with the London Rowing Club; his rowing crews often included E. C. Morley, the first secretary of the Football Association, or his successors, R. W. Willis and R. G. Graham.

== Football ==
Weston played for the Barnes Club between 1868 and 1875, and scored a goal in their first FA Cup match, a 2–0 victory over the Civil Service on 11 November 1871. His brothers Edward and Vincent played alongside him in this match.

Weston represented London against Sheffield in 1871 and 1872, and served on the FA committee in 1872–73.

In November 1871, Charles W. Alcock was organising the fourth "international" match between an England XI and a Scotland XI. Alcock had originally selected Henry Lake of Hampstead Heathens and Thomas Hooman (Wanderers), but both were unable to play and were replaced by Weston and Jarvis Kenrick. The match was played on 18 November at the Kennington Oval; England won 2–1, with R. S. F. Walker scoring both England's goals. According to the report on the match in Bell's Life, Walker's second goal came from "the ball having been splendidly run down by Weston".

Weston retained his place in the England XI for the next match, played at The Oval on 24 February 1872. The match was won by the England XI, with the only goal coming from Charles Clegg. One match report praised Weston's "forward play" while Bell's Life commented that "on several occasions, ... Weston seriously endangered the safety of the Scotch goal".

== Family ==
Weston married Blanche Katharine Williams (1851–1925) on 8 July 1873 at St Mary's Church, Putney. She was the daughter of the late Frederick Sims Williams (1812–1863) and his wife Katharine; he was a barrister who wrote several legal reference books, including The New Practice of the Court of Chancery....

Percy and Blanche had nine children: four sons and five daughters. At the 1881 census, the couple and their eldest five children were living at "Greenfields", Upper Sheen, Mortlake, with six staff, when Percy gave his occupation as a "Member of the London Stock Exchange". Twenty years later, the 1901 census shows the couple still living at "Greenfields" with two daughters and three staff; Percy was now described as a "Stock dealer – own account".

Their first son, Digby St Aubyn Percy (1874–1944), was born in April 1874; he had a long service in the Royal Navy, reaching the rank of commander.

The third son, Spencer Vaughan Percy (1883–1973), became a brigadier with the 17th Battalion Royal Fusiliers in the First World War; in 1943, he survived the sinking of the RMS Empress of Canada by the Italian submarine Leonardo da Vinci, off the West African coast. He married Henrietta Valerie Compton-Smith (1890–1980), whose brother Geoffrey Lee Compton-Smith (born 1889) was executed by the Irish Republican Army in April 1921.

The youngest of the four sons, Howard Vernon Percy (1884–1965), also served with the Royal Navy, reaching the rank of lieutenant commander.

A daughter, Beatrice Dorothy (1881–1970), married John Alexander Duncan (1878–1943). He was also a Royal Navy officer, reaching the rank of Commander. He was appointed a CB in June 1915. Their daughter was Ursula Katharine Duncan (1910–1985), who became an eminent bryologist.

== Death ==
Weston died on 30 June 1905 at 55a Welbeck Street, and was buried at St Mary's Church, Mortlake on 6 July. He left an estate valued at £24,062, equivalent to over £2.2 million at 2013 prices.

== Bibliography ==
- Collett, Mike (2003). The Complete Record of the FA Cup. Sports Books. ISBN 1-899807-19-5.
- Mitchell, Andy (2012). First Elevens: The Birth of International Football. Andy Mitchell Media. ISBN 978-1475206845.
