= William Crake =

Scottish footballer

William Parry Crake (11 February 1852 – 1 December 1921), sometimes known as William Parry, was an English amateur footballer who won the inaugural FA Cup with the Wanderers in 1872 and played for the English XI against Scotland in the representative matches between 1870 and 1872. By profession, he was a merchant in India.

== Family and education ==
Crake was born in Madras, India where his father had been in business. He was educated at Harrow School between 1866 and 1870. At Harrow, he was a member of the school football team in 1868 and 1869; he also played cricket for the school in his last two years.

On 2 April 1881, he married Emily Noble Chase in Madras; they had two sons:

- Ralph Hamilton Crake (1882–1952), who became a Lieutenant Colonel in the King's Own Scottish Borderers and was awarded the D.S.O. He played two first-class cricket matches, the first in 1901 and the last in 1921.
- Eric Hamilton Crake (1886–1948), who made one first-class cricket appearance for M.C.C. in 1912.

== Football career ==
He played football for several clubs, including the Barnes Club, Harrow Chequers and the Wanderers. He played as a forward and was described in the 1873 Football Annual as "a very neat dribbler, slow but certain" and "very useful on the side". He made his debut for the Wanderers on 5 January 1870 at Crystal Palace, having been introduced to the club by E. E. Bowen, a master at Harrow School.

In March 1870, he and Bowen were selected for the first unofficial international match between an English XI and a team representing Scotland, which had been arranged by another Old Harrovian, C. W. Alcock. One match report said that Crake "deserved no little praise for the energy of [his] following-up throughout the game". He also played for England in the matches played in November 1870 and February 1871 (listed as a member of the Barnes Club) and November 1871 (now with Harrow Chequers).

In 1871, Wanderers were one of 15 clubs who entered the inaugural FA Cup competition. Wanderers reached the final where they met a side from the Royal Engineers. Crake played as one of eight forwards as Wanderers claimed the trophy for the first of five times, with the single goal coming from Morton Betts.

Crake continued to play for the Wanderers until 1874, making a total of 23 appearances with three goals.

== Cricket career ==
Crake was a keen cricketer who played for various clubs, including M.C.C. and the Free Foresters. In June 1868, aged 16, he played for the M.C.C. against his own school.

== Professional career ==
By the end of the 1870s, Crake had returned to India and set up as a merchant. Following his retirement in 1892, he returned to England to live in Norfolk Crescent, near Hyde Park, London where he died on 1 December 1921, aged 69. He was buried at Kensal Green Cemetery.

== Honours ==
Wanderers

- FA Cup winners: 1872
