= Hampstead F.C. =

Hampstead F.C. may refer to:

- Harlequin F.C., an English rugby league club formed in 1866 as Hampstead F.C.
- Hendon F.C., an English association football club formed as Christchurch Hampstead in 1908, named Hampstead Town from 1909 to 1926, and Hampstead F.C. from 1926 to 1933
- Hampstead Heathens F.C., an English association football club active from 1868 to c. 1872, and an amateur club formed in 1975

== See also ==
- West Hampstead F.C., an English association football club active c. 1893–1906
