= 1871–72 in English football =

Football in England
- Season: 1871–72

Men's football
- FA Cup: Wanderers

The 1871–72 season was the first season of competitive association football in England. The Football Association introduced their Football Association Challenge Cup (now better known as the FA Cup), a knockout tournament which is the world's oldest national-level football competition.

When the Football Association football was formed in 1863, the sport was played mainly by public schools, or teams with public school roots, and amateurism was the norm. This remained the case until the 1880s, when working-class teams began to vie for supremacy.

== FA Cup ==
The competition began on 11 November 1871 when four matches were played. Fifteen clubs had entered but three of those withdrew so there were just twelve actual participants. They included the leading Scottish club, Queen's Park of Glasgow who reached the semi-final in which they drew 0–0 with the eventual winners Wanderers. A replay was required but Queen's Park could not afford the travel costs and withdrew. The other semi-final between Royal Engineers and the original Crystal Palace was also drawn and the Engineers won the replay 3–0. The first-ever final was won by Wanderers who defeated Royal Engineers 1–0 at Kennington Oval in south London. The goal was scored by Morton Betts after 15 minutes' play. Under the original rules of the competition, Wanderers automatically qualified for the next season's final to defend their trophy.

== Representative matches ==
During the season, two matches between teams representing England and Scotland were played at the Kennington Oval. The first was on 18 November 1871 and England won 2–1 with both goals scored by Robert Walker in the first half. Scotland's scorer, near the end of the match, was Henry Renny-Tailyour. The second match was on 24 February 1872 and England won 1–0 with a goal by Charlie Clegg midway through the first half. The crowd was less than a thousand.

These matches are no longer recognised as full internationals because the Scotland team consisted entirely of Anglo-Scots based in the London area, so there were no Scottish residents or players from Scottish clubs. Nevertheless, the games were the forerunners of international football which began the following season when the first official match was played in Glasgow on 30 November 1872.

== Honours ==
Competition	Winners	Runners-up	Venue	Result
FA Cup	Wanderers (1/0)	Royal Engineers (0/1)	Kennington Oval	1–0

(Note: figures in parentheses display the club's tournament record as winners/runners-up.)
