= Henry Rich =

Henry Rich may refer to:

- Henry Rich, 1st Earl of Holland (1590–1649), English courtier, peer and soldier
- Sir Henry Rich, 1st Baronet (1803–1869), Liberal politician
- Henry Bayard Rich (1849–1884), British soldier and football player

== See also ==
- Frederick Henry Rich (1824–1904), British soldier and Chief Inspecting Officer of the Railway Inspectorate
