= Thomas Hooman =

English footballer

Thomas Charles Hooman
Personal information
- Full name: Thomas Charles Hooman
- Date of birth: 28 December 1850
- Place of birth: Kidderminster, Worcestershire, England
- Date of death: 22 September 1938 (aged 87)
- Place of death: Hythe, Kent, England
- Position: Forward

Youth career
- Charterhouse School

Senior career*
Years	Team	Apps	(Gls)
1870s	Wanderers		

International career
1871	England (unofficial)	2	(0)
- * Club domestic league appearances and goals

Thomas Charles Hooman (28 December 1850 – 22 September 1938) was a leading English association football player of the Victorian era. He played for Wanderers in the 1872 FA Cup Final and was also chosen to represent England on several occasions.

== Early life ==
Hooman was born in Kidderminster, Worcestershire, the son of a carpet manufacturer. He attended Charterhouse School and represented the school at cricket.

== Football career ==
Hooman played football for Wanderers, one of the leading clubs of the 1870s, as a forward. He was described by contemporary commentators as "the fastest dribbler of the day, and an accomplished player". In 1871 he was chosen to play for the England national team in two matches against Scotland at The Oval, although these matches are not now regarded as official international matches by The Football Association. He was also chosen to play in what is now regarded as the first official international match, between England and Scotland in Glasgow in 1872, but was unavailable due to other commitments. He was also selected for teams representing Middlesex and London.

Hooman played for Wanderers in the 1872 FA Cup Final, the final of the first FA Cup competition, and helped his team to a 1–0 victory over Royal Engineers. He was still playing for the club a year later, when Wanderers played in the 1873 Final, but was unavailable on the day of the final.

== Outside football ==
Hooman also competed in various other sports, representing England in athletics and rowing at the Henley Royal Regatta. He was also adept at boxing and golf. Hooman took third place in the 100 yards event at the 1871 AAC Championships.

He went into business as a merchant ship broker and later as a manufacturer of Portland cement. His son Charles (born 1887), played for Kent County Cricket Club and played golf for Britain and Ireland in the first two Walker Cup competitions in the early 1920s.

== Death ==
Hooman died in Hythe, Kent at the age of 87 following an operation. His obituary was published in several newspapers, all of which repeated a claim that he had scored the winning goal in the 1872 Cup final. This contradicts contemporary newspaper reports on the match, all of which state that Morton Betts scored the Wanderers' goal. The obituaries also mention other things which Hooman "told a reporter some time ago" about the game which are demonstrably incorrect, such as the claim that there was no referee, suggesting that in his recollections he was confusing the final with another match in which he played.
