= Frederick Wall =

English football administrator (1858–1944)

Sir Frederick Joseph Wall (14 April 1858 – 25 March 1944) was an English football administrator.

== Career ==
Wall became Secretary of the Football Association, a position he held from 1895 to 1934. He was knighted in the 1930 New Year's Honours List.

Notably, Wall refused on behalf of the FA to offer wartime financial compensation to famed Anglo-Irish coach Jimmy Hogan, on the basis of the latter's perceived co-operation with the Central Powers during the First World War (Hogan had coached Hungarian side MTK Budapest whilst interned as an enemy alien during the conflict).

After retiring as FA Secretary, he was a director of Arsenal from 1934 to 1938. Wall credited the Royal Engineers with being the first side to play the modern passing football style known as the Combination Game. He credited the Corinthians with bringing about the later developments in the passing game.
