= Cowley Academy =

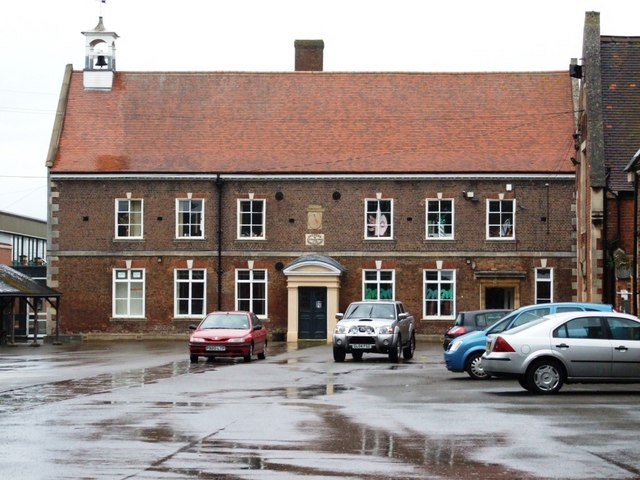
- Cowley High School

Location
- School Lane; Donington, Lincolnshire, PE11 4TF; England
- Coordinates: 52.90506°N 0.19913°W

Information
- Former name: The Thomas Cowley High School
- Type: Academy
- Established: 1719; 307 years ago
- Founder: Thomas Cowley
- Department for Education URN: 149436 Tables
- Ofsted: Reports
- Gender: Mixed
- Age: 11 to 16
- Website: www.cowleyacademy.org.uk

Cowley Academy (formally The Thomas Cowley High School) is a mixed secondary school with Academy status, in Donington, Lincolnshire, England. As of 1 September 2022, it is part of the South Lincolnshire Academy Trust.

== History ==
Landowner Thomas Cowley by deed in 1701, and by will in 1711 and 1718, bequeathed his estate to endow an almshouse, and a charity school to teach twenty poor children to read English and write. A pupil of the Cowley's charity school was Matthew Flinders, who at age 12 then attended Horbling Grammar School where his father expected him to learn Latin. The free school established by Thomas Cowley evolved into a grammar school, with the Cowley charity providing significant funding. By 1858 the school, which was governed by a scheme approved by the Master of the Rolls, John Romilly, also provided for an upper girls' school, an elementary boys' and girls' school, and an infants school. The grammar school held 80 pupils, with an average attendance of 40. At the time a new scheme was proposed to develop the Girls' department with a yearly endowment of £25 to provide minor scholarships and accommodation for resident pupils, with the inclusion of teaching of the "art of cookery." The Grammar and Girls' Upper School were not exclusive to Donington, but were open to pupils from the whole county, with fees being £4 yearly for boys, and £3 for girls. The school covered 5 acres and included a residence for the masters and mistresses, a house for the headmaster, a recreation ground, cricket field, gymnasium, and playgrounds.

In 1871 the Grammar school's football team entered the first ever edition of the FA Cup, but withdrew and did not complete a game.

Grammar school status was held until 1949. A secondary modern school was then established in its place using the Thomas Cowley name, which in 1995 became a comprehensive secondary school. In September 2006 the comprehensive school was designated as specialist Technology College, and in September 2012 it converted to Academy status.

== Notable former pupils ==
Donington Free School (est. 1718):

- Matthew Flinders – navigator and cartographer

Donington Grammar School:

- Donald Bruce, Baron Bruce of Donington – soldier, businessman and politician
- Eric Houghton – footballer and manager
- Sarah Swift – founder of the Royal College of Nursing
- Mitchel Corrado – actor
