= Eric Crake =

English cricketer

Personal information
- Full name: Eric Hamilton Crake
- Born: 25 January 1886; Madras, Madras Presidency, British Raj
- Died: 3 February 1948 (aged 62); Nakuru, Kenya
- Batting: Unknown
- Relatives: Ralph Crake (brother)

Domestic team information
- Years: Team
- 1912: Marylebone Cricket Club

Career statistics
Competition	First-class
Matches	1
Runs scored	1
Batting average	1.00
100s/50s	–/–
Top score	1
Catches/stumpings	–/–
- Source: ESPNcricinfo, 20 July 2014

Eric Hamilton Crake (25 January 1886 – 3 February 1948) was a Scottish cricketer. He was born at Madras in the British Raj, to Emily Noble Chase and the merchant and footballer William Crake.

Educated at Harrow School, where he captained the school's cricket team in 1905 and 1906, Crake was a batsman of unknown handedness. He made one appearance in first-class cricket for the Marylebone Cricket Club (MCC) against Oxford University in 1912 at the University Parks, Oxford. He batted once in the match, scoring a single run in the MCC's first-innings, before he was dismissed by Neville Fraser. The match ended in a draw.

He died at Nakuru in Kenya on 3 February 1948. His brother Ralph Crake was also a first-class cricketer.
