= Geoffrey Lee Compton-Smith =

British Army officer killed in Irish War of Independence

Major Geoffrey Lee Compton-Smith DSO
- Born: 1889 South Kensington, London, United Kingdom
- Died: April 30, 1921 (aged 31–32) Barrahaurin, County Cork, Ireland
- Cause of death: Execution by firing squad
- Allegiance: United Kingdom
- Branch: British Army
- Rank: Major
- Spouse: Gladys Mary Lloyd (m. 1916–1921)

Major Geoffrey Lee Compton-Smith was an officer of the British Army who was captured and killed by the Irish Republican Army during the Irish War of Independence. He has since been noted for the gallantry with which he faced his death.

== Early life ==
Compton-Smith was born in 1889 in South Kensington to father William Compton-Smith. After he finished school, he decided to become an artist rather than enter the family business of law, but joined the British Army as an officer at his father's behest. He studied at the Royal Military College, Sandhurst and commissioned into the Royal Welch Fusiliers, with whom he was sent to fight in France in the First World War. He was awarded the Distinguished Service Order for 'conspicuous gallantry' when he continued to fight after being wounded in the Battle of Arras. He also received the French Legion of Honour. In 1916 he was married to Gladys Mary Lloyd, with whom he had a daughter named Anne.

== Service in Ireland ==
In 1919, Compton-Smith was sent to fight in the Irish War of Independence, where he would serve as commander of the British base at Ballyvonane Townland in County Cork. Various sources alleged that he was serving as an intelligence officer at this time. In January 1921, he sentenced three IRA volunteers to six months' imprisonment for an ambush against British forces.

On April 16, 1921, Compton-Smith travelled to Blarney, where he was captured by an IRA squad led by Frank Busteed. After being transported through a series of IRA safe houses, he was taken to what would be his final place of captivity; the Moynihan family farm in Barrahaurin Townland. He was kept there for eleven days, in which time he became acquainted with the family and IRA guards, eating and drinking with them and participating in rebel singsongs.

== Death ==
The purpose of Compton-Smith's captivity was for the IRA to use him as a bargaining chip for the lives of four IRA men who had been captured by the British. On April 29, those four men were executed. Jackie O'Leary, the IRA battalion commander, consequently informed Compton-Smith on April 30 that he was to die. Compton-Smith composed one letter to his wife and another to his regiment. He gifted his silver pocket watch to O'Leary, who presided over the execution, saying in his letter to his wife that he did so because he

believe[d] [O'Leary] to be a gentleman and to mark the fact that I bear him no malice for carrying out what he sincerely believes to be his duty.

He was subsequently led to the treeline behind the farm, where he was offered a last cigarette. He reputedly told the firing squad that their signal to fire would be when he finished and threw down his cigarette. In his final letters he expressed his love for his wife, camaraderie for his regiment, and his belief that the men carrying out his execution were "mistaken idealists rather than a murder gang."
