= Harrow Chequers F.C. =

Harrow Chequers
- Nickname: the Chequers
- Founded: 1865
- Dissolved: 1876
- Ground: Kennington Oval, London
- Hon. Sec.: Reginald Courtenay Welch (1872–84); James Herbert Farmer (1886–91)
Home colours

Harrow Chequers Football Club was a football club from London, England, from 1865 to 1876. Derived from former pupils of Harrow School, the club was involved in the formation of the FA Cup in 1871. It was slated to play in three of the first six FA Cup competitions in the 1870s, but they forfeited each time, and never contested an FA Cup match as the Chequers. One of their players, however, Morton Betts, is remembered for scoring the first (and only) goal in the first ever FA Cup Final in 1872.

== History ==
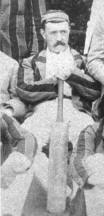
Morton Betts.

The club was formed in 1865, "consisting of Harrovians past and present", and its first reported game was in November that year.

Charles W. Alcock, the creator of the FA Cup, was a graduate of Harrow. He likely derived the concept of the competition from Harrow's tradition of houses playing an annual knock-out tournament where the winning house was named the "Cock House." The Harrow Chequers was slated to be one of the twelve teams involved in the first FA Cup in 1871-1872. They drew Wanderers in the first round, which was also a team primarily made up of Harrow graduates. Indeed, one 1869 match report stated that the Wanderers and Chequers consisted of "almost the same team" of men. In any event, the Chequers withdrew and thus the Wanderers advanced on a walkover.

The Wanderers eventually advanced to the final, and won 1–0 against the Royal Engineers. The winning goal in that match was scored by Morton Betts, who played under the pseudonym "A.H. Chequer", i.e. "A Harrow Chequer", the team for which he had previously played, and for which he was club secretary in 1871. It is sometimes suggested in modern times that he played under a fake name to avoid being cup-tied, but such a rule did not exist at the time, and it is more likely that it may have simply been a whimsical adoption.

The Chequers' next "appearance" in the FA Cup was in the 1874–75 competition. They were drawn against Civil Service, but again withdrew so that also was a walkover to the opposition in the first round. The same occurrence happened in the next Cup against Leyton.

In 1876, the Athletic News reported that the club had changed its name to the "Old Harrovians" as the club had become one exclusively for old boys from the school, rather than including current pupils. The Chequers concept was thereby defunct.

== Colours ==
The club played in blue and white "chequers", the term used for quartered shirts at the time, the shade confirmed as dark in 1877, when inherited by the Old Harrovians.

== Ground ==
The club played its home matches at Lillie Bridge or the Kennington Oval, the home of Surrey County Cricket Club; Charles Alcock was secretary of both Surrey and the Chequers.

== Legacy ==
In 1891, an article in Fores's Sporting Notes reviewed a copy of the 1874 Football Annual, which commented on the fact that clubs could come and go over time. The 1874 annual listed less than 200 football clubs in all of England, and the author asked "what has become of such old giants as the Gitanos, Harrow Chequers, Pilgrims, and Woodford Wells."
