= Ralph Crake =

Scottish cricketer and soldier

Personal information
- Full name: Ralph Hamilton Crake
- Born: 13 April 1882; Madras, Madras Presidency, British India
- Died: 26 January 1952 (aged 69); Edinburgh, Midlothian, Scotland
- Batting: Unknown
- Relatives: Eric Crake (brother)

Domestic team information
- Years: Team
- 1901: Marylebone Cricket Club
- 1920/21: Europeans

Career statistics
Competition	First-class
Matches	2
Runs scored	47
Batting average	11.75
100s/50s	–/–
Top score	37
Catches/stumpings	1/–
- Source: Cricinfo, 30 May 2021

Ralph Hamilton Crake DSO DL (13 April 1882 – 26 January 1952) was a Scottish first-class cricketer and British Army officer.

The son of the merchant and footballer William Crake, he was born in British India at Madras. He was educated in England at Harrow School, where he played for the school cricket team. Having left Harrow in 1900, Crake played a single first-class cricket match for the Marylebone Cricket Club (MCC) against Nottinghamshire at Lord's in 1901. He scored 8 runs in the MCC first innings and a single run in their second innings, being dismissed on both occasions by John Gunn.

After completing his education, he attended the Royal Military College, Sandhurst. He graduated from that school in May 1901, and was commissioned as a second lieutenant in the King's Own Scottish Borderers. Soon after being commissioned he went to South Africa, where he saw action with the 1st battalion of his regiment in the Second Boer War. The war in South Africa ended in May 1902, and he returned home later that year, on the SS Kildonan Castle in December 1902. He was promoted to lieutenant in September 1905, with promotion to captain following in November 1908. He was stationed in Egypt in 1909, where he played minor cricket matches for the Egyptian cricket team. Crake served in the First World War, seeing action during the Mesopotamian campaign from 1915 to 1918. He gained promotion to major in May 1916, while in August of the same year he was made an acting lieutenant colonel while commanding a battalion. He relinquished his acting rank in October 1916, but was once again made an acting lieutenant colonel in August 1917. Crake was awarded the Distinguished Service Order in February 1918.

Following the war, he served in British India. While there, he made his second appearance in first-class cricket, after a gap of nearly twenty years, for the Europeans cricket team against the Parsees at Bombay in the Bombay Quadrangular in November 1920. Batting twice during the match, he made scores of 37 in the Europeans first innings and 1 in their second innings, being dismissed on both occasions by M. B. Vatcha.

Crake was promoted to the full rank of lieutenant colonel in July 1930, before being placed on the half-pay list in July 1934. He retired from active service in January 1935. Crake was appointed a deputy lieutenant of Berwickshire in April 1937. During the Second World War he assisted the Army Cadet Force at Roxburgh. Crake died at Edinburgh in January 1952. His brother, Eric, was also a first-class cricketer.
