= Donington School F.C. =

Association football club from Lincolnshire which entered the first FA Cup

Donington School
- Full name: Donington Grammar School Football Club
- Founded: May 1870
- Dissolved: 1949
- Ground: The School Ground
- Secretaries: L. S. Calvert & E. Morris
1870–74 colours	1874–1939 colours

Donington School F.C. was an English football club, based in Donington, Lincolnshire.

== History ==
The club represented the Donington Grammar School, and claimed a foundation date of May 1870, it had actually joined the Football Association in 1868, possibly to gather information.

The club entered the first ever FA Cup in 1871–72, as a way of increasing the pupils' physical fitness. Having been drawn against Queen's Park of Glasgow in the first round, the two teams could not agree on a date for the match, and both were allowed to progress to the second round of fixtures. However, the two teams were again drawn together in round two, and in this instance Donington School withdrew, rather than face the cost (around £2 per student) and time of the trip to Scotland.

The club did not enter the FA Cup again, although it did remain a member of the Football Association until 1882; its remoteness and status as a school team meant it had few matches as a "senior" side, in the 1874–75 season only playing three times, scoring four goals and not conceding.

In 1949 the school was renamed the Thomas Cowley School. A team of ex-pupils played an exhibition match in Glasgow against Queen's Park in May 1972, as part of the Football Association's centenary celebrations. The match was won 6–0 by Queen's Park.

== Colours ==
The club originally wore white trimmed with blue. In 1874 it changed to scarlet and black jersey, cap, and stockings, and the school was still wearing the same schema (with black shorts) up to the Second World War. The final kit the school wore as Donington was white shirts and black shorts.

== Ground ==
The club played on the school premises, six miles from Surfleet railway station.
