= Hugh Mitchell (Scottish footballer) =

Scottish soldier, barrister & footballer (1849–1937)

Personal information
- Date of birth: 3 December 1849
- Place of birth: Marylebone, London, England
- Date of death: 16 August 1937 (aged 87)
- Place of death: Brakpan, South Africa
- Position: Forward

Senior career*
Years	Team	Apps	(Gls)
c. 1870 – c. 1872	Royal Engineers A.F.C.		

International career
1871–1872	Scotland	2	(0)
- * Club domestic league appearances and goals

Capt. Hugh Mitchell (3 December 1849 – 16 August 1937) was a Scottish member of the Royal Engineers who later became a barrister. In his youth he was a keen footballer who played for the Royal Engineers in the 1872 FA Cup Final and appeared for Scotland in two of the representative matches played against England in 1871 and 1872.

== Family and education ==
Mitchell was born in Marylebone, London, the son of Lieut. Col. Hugh Mitchell of the Madras army and his wife Jessie née McCaskill. He was educated at Harrow School between 1864 and 1867 before going to the Royal Military Academy, Woolwich. At Harrow, he was a keen sportsman, representing the school at football, cricket and shooting.

In 1878, he married Mary Catherine "Katie" Creswell, the sister of Col. Edmund Creswell who had played alongside him in the 1872 FA Cup Final. They had seven children, including Philip Euen Mitchell (1890–1964), who served as Governor of Uganda, Fiji and Kenya. Katie died in 1892 following the birth of her youngest child. Mitchell had always been "rather dour" and his wife's death was "an incurable loss and grief" to him; as a result, he became more withdrawn and was seen by his grandchildren as a "patriarchal and terrifying figure".

== Football career ==
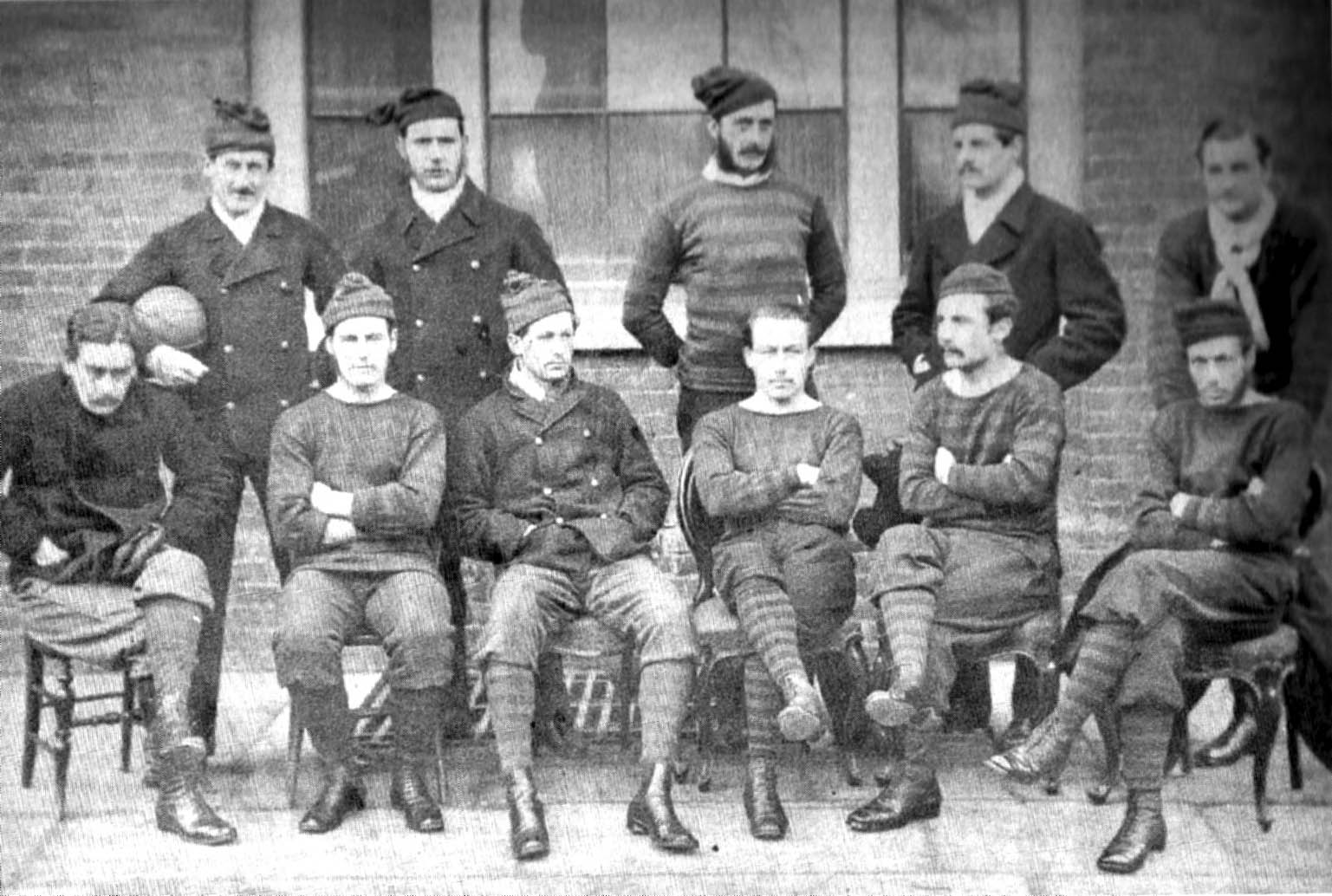
The Royal Engineers team of 1872. Eight of these players played in the first FA Cup Final. Mitchell is standing on the right

Mitchell played as a forward who was described as "a good charger and useful forward [who] sticks to the ball well". He was part of the Royal Engineers team who reached the final of the inaugural FA Cup tournament, scoring a goal in the semi-final replay over Crystal Palace. In the final, played at Kennington Oval on 16 March 1872, the Engineers were defeated by the Wanderers by a single goal, scored by Morton Betts.

In November 1871, he was selected to play for Scotland in the fourth of a series of matches between teams representing Scotland and England; he qualified for the Scottish team by virtue of his father's Scottish origins. The match ended in a 2–1 defeat, with the Scots' goal being scored by Mitchell's Royal Engineers team-mate, Lieut. Henry Renny-Tailyour. He retained his place in the Scottish team for the final match in the series, played the following February, which ended in a 1–0 victory for the English.

== Military career ==
Mitchell joined the Royal Engineers as a Lieutenant on 8 January 1870. He was posted to Bermuda from 1873 to 1875 and then to Gibraltar before returning to England in 1878 where he worked in the War Office. Although he was promoted to the rank of Captain on 8 January 1882, he retired from the army two months later to qualify as a lawyer.

== Legal career ==
He became a student of the Inner Temple on 21 January 1881 (then aged 31) and was called to the bar on 7 May 1884. He moved to South Wales where he operated on the South Wales and Chester Circuit and the Glamorgan Sessions. He practiced in Gibraltar and Tangier from 1896.

He retired in 1926 and moved to South Africa where he died at Brakpan on 16 August 1937.
