= 1871–72 FA Cup =

1871–72 FA Cup (1st edition)
Tournament details
- Country: England (and one entrant from Scotland)
- Dates: 11 November 1871 – 16 March 1872
- Teams: 15

Final positions
- Champions: Wanderers (1st title)
- Runners-up: Royal Engineers
- Semifinalists: Queen's Park; Clapham Rovers

Tournament statistics
- Matches played: 15
- Goals scored: 26 (1.73 per match)

The 1871–72 Football Association Challenge Cup was the inaugural Football Association Challenge Cup tournament. Commonly known for most of its existence as the FA Cup, it is the oldest association football competition in the world. Its creation had been proposed by Charles W. Alcock, the secretary of the Football Association (the FA), which had been formed eight years earlier in an attempt to formalise a standard set of rules for football, as no universally agreed rules existed. Fifteen of the Association's member clubs entered the tournament, although three withdrew without playing a match. A number of matches involved teams playing with fewer than the required eleven men due to players failing to turn up. Queen's Park, the only entrant from Scotland, reached the semi-finals without playing a game, but, after being held to a draw, they withdrew as they could not afford to return to London for a replay. Wanderers, their opponents in the semi-finals, won the final on 16 March 1872 at Kennington Oval in London, defeating Royal Engineers by a single goal, scored by Morton Betts, who was playing under the pseudonym A.H. Chequer. The first season of the competition was considered a success and contributed to an increased adoption of the association rules.

== Background ==
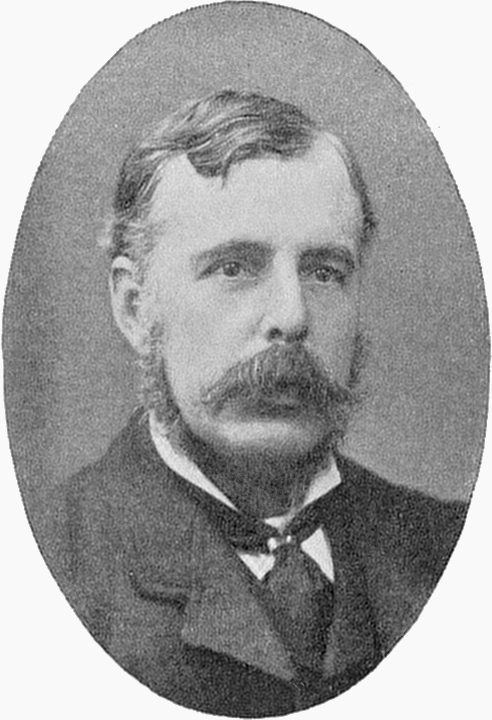
Charles W. Alcock proposed the creation of the competition.

The Football Association Challenge Cup (commonly known for most of its existence as the FA Cup) was the first formal competition created for the sport of association football, which had first been codified in England in 1863. The Football Association (the FA) had been created in an attempt to formalise a standard set of rules for football, as no universally agreed rules existed; many clubs adopted what came to be known as association football, but others continued to use differing rules. For the first eight years of the FA's existence, its member clubs took part only in friendly matches, with no prizes at stake. The creation of a knock-out tournament open to all member clubs was proposed in 1871 by Charles W. Alcock, the secretary of the FA, who wrote that "it is desirable that a Challenge Cup should be established in connection with the Association, for which all clubs belonging to the Association should be invited to compete". His inspiration was a similar competition between houses during his time as a pupil at Harrow School.

Around fifty clubs were eligible to enter, but only twelve did so: Barnes, Civil Service, Clapham Rovers, Crystal Palace, (Note: This Crystal Palace club is not generally regarded as being the same as the modern club of the same name. In 2020, the modern club, which had long been regarded as having been formed in 1905, began asserting that it was a direct continuation of the team which existed in the 1870s based on new research by club historians, but this was disputed by other football researchers and rejected by the English football authorities.) Hampstead Heathens, Harrow Chequers, Lausanne, Royal Engineers (representing the Corps of Royal Engineers of the British Army), Upton Park, Wanderers, and Windsor Home Park, all based in either London or the counties immediately bordering it, plus the leading club in Scotland, Queen's Park. Before the first-round draw took place, however, Lausanne and Windsor Home Park withdrew, reducing the number of entrants to ten. Five other clubs were persuaded to enter, including the Maidenhead club, which was not at the time affiliated to the Association but agreed to take part nonetheless. Some clubs declined to enter because they had already arranged a full season of matches and did not wish to cancel any, while others felt that competing for a prize was not in keeping with the amateur ethos of the sport. The players who represented the clubs affiliated to the FA at the time were drawn almost exclusively from the upper classes.

The rules of the competition stipulated that each team should consist of eleven players, and that each match should last 90 minutes (at the time, the Laws of the Game did not specify either of these points). If a match was drawn after 90 minutes, there would either be a replay or both teams would be allowed to proceed to the next round; the choice between these alternatives was left to the organising committee's discretion in each case. Matches in the early rounds were officiated by two umpires, one provided by each team; for the semi-finals and final, the umpires were appointed by the FA, as was an additional referee. At the time, the umpires had the primary responsibility for enforcing the Laws of the Game during a match, and the referee's role was to resolve disputes if the umpires could not agree. The competition began under the version of the Laws in force since February 1871, but changes made in February 1872, including the introduction of the corner kick, were put into effect immediately and used for the first time during the semi-final replay between Royal Engineers and Crystal Palace on 9 March.

== First round ==
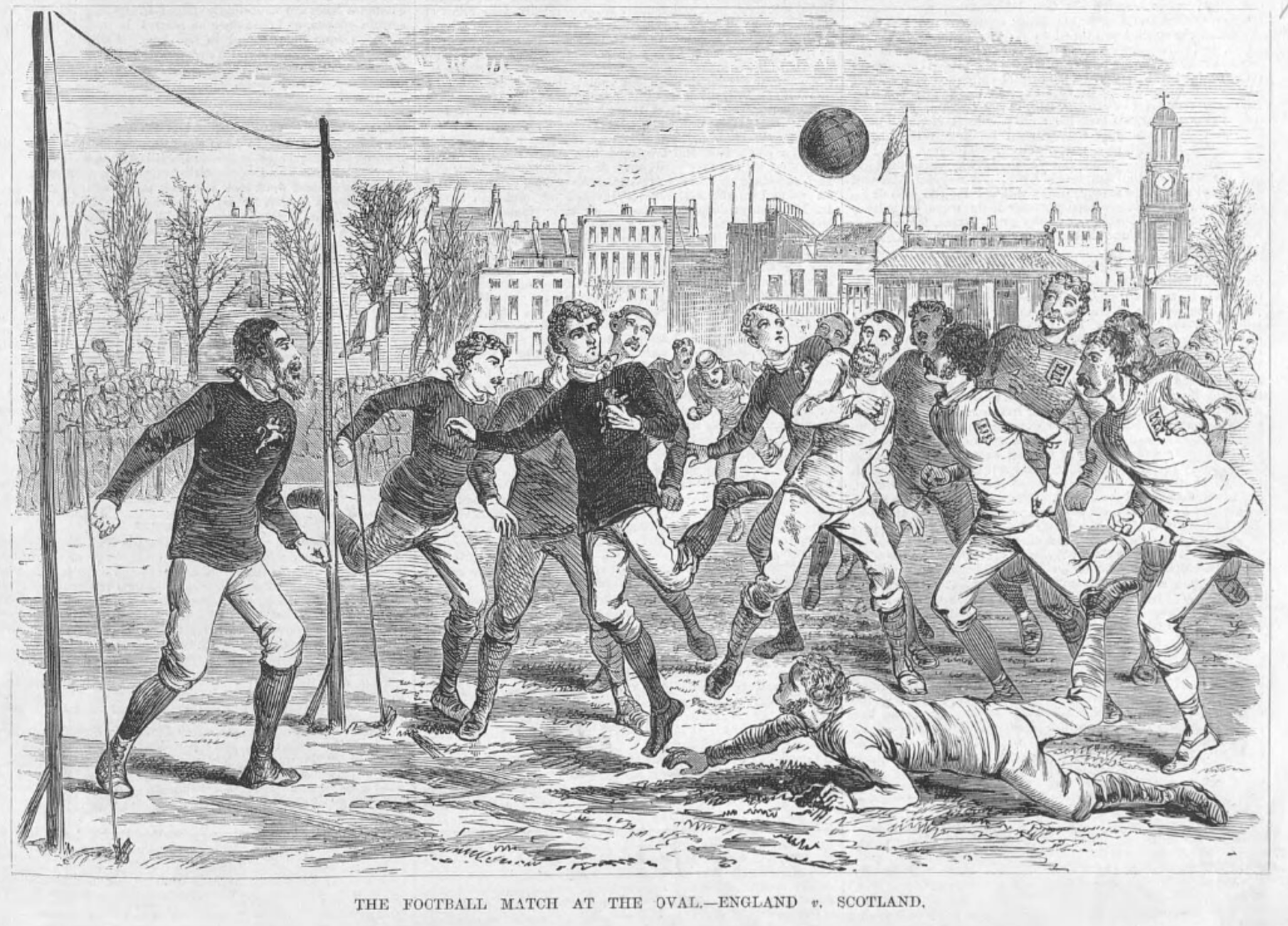
An illustration of football as it was played in the 1870s

The draw for the first round took place on 23 October. With fifteen entrants, seven matches were scheduled and Hampstead Heathens received a bye to the second round. A notice published in The Sportsman indicated that further clubs could still enter the competition and be added to the first round, but in the event no further matches were added. Although seven matches were scheduled in the first round, only four took place; all of them were played on 11 November. Wanderers and Royal Engineers both won by walkover when their opponents, Reigate Priory and Harrow Chequers respectively, withdrew from the competition. Queen's Park and Donington School, the only two "provincial teams" (those from outside London and its environs), could not agree on a date for their match at short notice and were both permitted to advance to the second round without playing.

Clapham Rovers gained what The Field deemed a very easy victory away to Upton Park. Jarvis Kenrick opened the scoring with the first goal in FA Cup competition, and Thompson added a second. Kenrick scored again late in the game and Clapham won 3–0. Bell's Life in London wrote that Upton Park "could do very little against the superior play of the visitors". Civil Service only managed to muster eight players for their match against Barnes, an occurrence which The Sportsman said was not uncommon. After a goalless first half, Barnes scored twice to secure victory. The Sportsman reported that there were a number of disputes about the rules during the game, especially concerning the legality of players handling the ball, and suggested that the appointment of neutral umpires should be considered.

Hitchin took on Crystal Palace in a match played in rainy conditions which made the pitch slippery. The game was even throughout and ended in a goalless draw; The Sportsman noted that the Crystal Palace players "were more conversant with the rules than their opponents". Both teams were permitted to advance to the second round without staging a replay. The match between Maidenhead and Marlow at the former's ground was delayed by nearly an hour due to the late arrival of the visiting team and then further delayed when it was found that twelve players had taken the field for Marlow. After an even first half in which both teams had unsuccessful attempts at goal, G. Young scored twice for Maidenhead to secure victory.

11 November 1871

Barnes	2–0	Civil Service
Percy Weston; A. Dunnage

Barnes, London
11 November 1871
15:00

Hitchin	0–0	Crystal Palace

Hitchin, Hertfordshire
11 November 1871
15:20

Maidenhead	2–0	Marlow
G. Young

Maidenhead, Berkshire
11 November 1871

Upton Park	0–3	Clapham Rovers
		Jarvis Kenrick; A. Thompson

Upton Park, Essex

Queen's Park	vs. not played - both progress	Donington School

Royal Engineers	walkover from	Reigate Priory (withdrew)

Wanderers	walkover from	Harrow Chequers (withdrew)

Hampstead Heathens	bye

== Second round ==
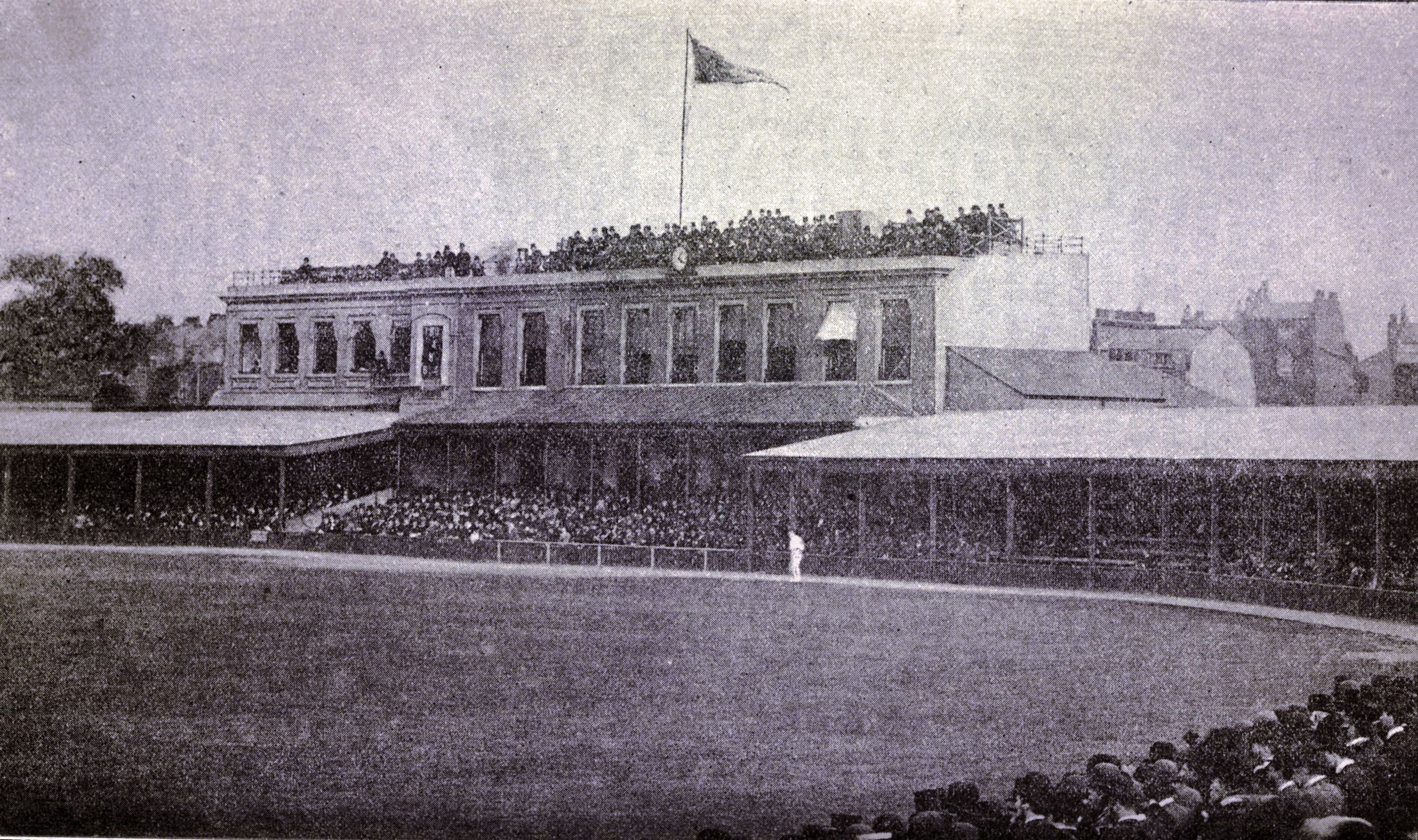
Royal Engineers defeated Hitchin at London's Kennington Oval (pictured in 1891).

In the second round Queen's Park and Donington School were again drawn together under a rule requiring provincial teams to be drawn against each other in rounds prior to the semi-finals for logistical reasons. This time the school club withdrew from the competition altogether, meaning that Queen's Park had progressed through two rounds without playing a match. Donington School never entered the competition again, making it one of a small number of clubs to have entered the FA Cup but never played an actual match.

The first two games in the round took place on 16 December. Wanderers beat Clapham Rovers 1–0 in a match which ended in near darkness after the start was delayed due to the late arrival of a number of players. (Note: Some modern sources give the result as 3–1, but this is not supported by contemporary newspaper reports.) The Sportsman singled out Edgar Lubbock for his fine play for the victors. Crystal Palace won 3–0 at home to Maidenhead despite Alexander Morten, their goalkeeper, arriving late. The Sporting Life wrote that their victory demonstrated "the value of endurance combined with speed".

A week later, Hampstead Heathens arrived for their game away to Barnes with only ten players but took the lead despite their numerical disadvantage; almost immediately afterwards the home team repeatedly attacked but were thwarted by the Hampstead backs. Finally, after 68 minutes, Highton equalised for Barnes with a shot which went in off the goalpost. At this point the game was abandoned due to bad light. The match between Royal Engineers and Hitchin, originally scheduled for 14 December, was postponed "in consequence of the continued illness of His Royal Highness, the Prince of Wales". It was eventually played on 10 January. Hitchin arrived for the match at Kennington Oval in London with only eight players and found themselves 5–0 down after an hour. At this point the match, which was played in thick fog, was abandoned and the result allowed to stand.

16 December 1871
15:00

Clapham Rovers	0–1	Wanderers
		T.H. Pelham

unknown
16 December 1871

Crystal Palace	3–0	Maidenhead
Bouch; Charles Chenery; Lloyd

Crystal Palace Park, London
23 December 1871

Barnes	1–1 abandoned	Hampstead Heathens
Highton		Barker

Barnes, London
10 January 1872

Hitchin	0–5	Royal Engineers
		Unknown

Kennington Oval, London

Queen's Park	walkover from	Donington School (withdrew)

=== Replays ===
The replay between Barnes and Hampstead Heathens took place on the first Saturday of the new year. The Heathens again only managed to field ten players, but the match was even in the first half. After the interval, the Heathens dominated and G. Leach scored what proved to be the only goal of the game. Bell's Life in London praised the play of Barker, Michell and Tatham for Hampstead, saying that the last-named player "kicked with his usual judgment and never-failing coolness".

6 January 1872
15:15

Barnes	0–1	Hampstead Heathens
		G. Leach

Barnes, London

== Third round ==
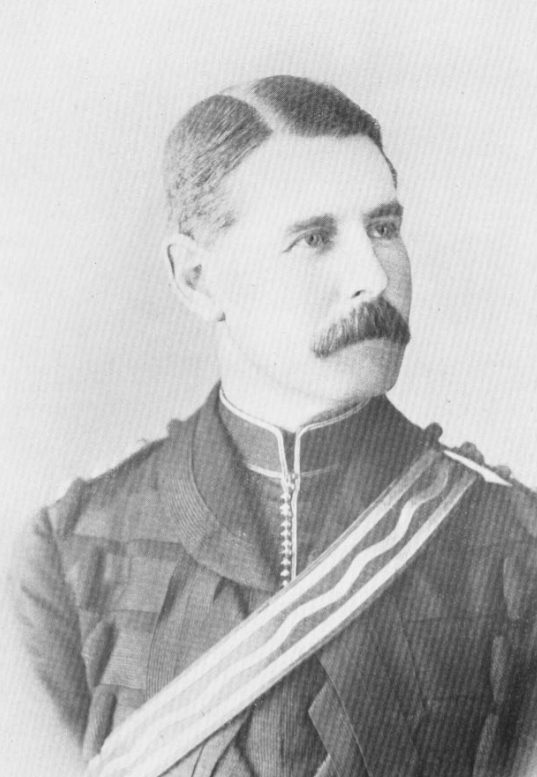
Henry Renny-Tailyour helped Royal Engineers beat Hampstead Heathens.

Wanderers took on Crystal Palace on 20 January at Clapham Rovers' ground. Wanderers dominated the early stages and Alcock, who played for them in addition to being secretary of the FA, had a shot that went over the tape used to mark the top of the goal. Crystal Palace made several attacks, but after 45 minutes the match was scoreless. In the second half, C.W. Stephenson appeared to have scored a goal for Wanderers but it was disallowed because of a handball offence and the final score was 0–0. The correspondent for The Field wrote that the only weakness shown by the Wanderers players was their "disinclination to help each other" and that the play of their opponents was "much inferior". Cuthbert Ottaway, who had been in the Marlow team defeated by Maidenhead in the first round, played for Crystal Palace. Although the original rules of the Cup stated that no player could compete for more than one team during a season's tournament, this rule had apparently been dropped or was simply disregarded. Following the drawn game, Wanderers and Crystal Palace were both permitted to advance to the semi-finals.

Royal Engineers completed the semi-final line-up after beating Hampstead Heathens 3–0 on 27 January. The Heathens began the game with only nine players, although a tenth arrived midway through the game. The Engineers took an early lead following a scrimmage in front of their opponents' goal, and scored twice more to complete the victory. Henry Renny-Tailyour was singled out by the press for his performance for the winning team. Hampstead Heathens never again entered the competition.

With no other provincial teams remaining in the competition, Queen's Park received a bye and reached the semi-finals, still without having played a match. This, combined with Wanderers and Crystal Palace both progressing, meant that only one team was eliminated in the third round.

20 January 1872
15:15

Wanderers	0–0	Crystal Palace

Clapham Common, London
27 January 1872

Royal Engineers	3–0	Hampstead Heathens
Henry Renny-Tailyour; Hugh Mitchell

Chatham, Kent,

Queen's Park	bye

== Semi-finals ==
The rules of the competition specified that all matches from the semi-finals onwards were to be played in London, and both semi-finals took place at Kennington Oval. Crystal Palace took on Royal Engineers in the first semi-final on 17 February. The Engineers won the coin toss and initially played with the wind in their favour; during the first half most of the play was close to the Crystal Palace goal and, according to Bell's Life in London, "the ball [...] was only prevented from being driven between the goal-posts by the greatest exertions of the Crystal Palace back players". After 45 minutes the teams changed ends as no goals had been scored. (Note: Under the rules in place at the time, teams changed ends after every goal and only changed ends at half-time if there had been no goals scored up to that point.) In the second half Ottaway and Charles Chenery made some good runs for Crystal Palace and their opponents made one late rush, but the game finished in a goalless draw, The Sportsman observing that "neither side [...] obtained any advantage of movement".

The match between Wanderers and Queen's Park on 5 March was the first time that a Scottish team had played in London and The Sportsman wrote that "no small interest was evinced to see how the Glasgow eleven would fare". The same reporter noted that the Scottish players were lighter than their opponents but "atoned by the energy of their play". Queen's Park dominated the first ten minutes of the match, but their opponents then regrouped and the game was even until the 45-minute mark. Wanderers had a number of goalscoring chances in the second half, including one which went so narrowly over the tape that the players appealed to the umpires for a ruling. After ninety minutes the score remained 0–0; Wanderers proposed thirty minutes of extra time to settle the match, but Queen's Park refused and subsequently withdrew from the competition as they could not afford to travel to London again for a replay. An article published in Bell's Life in London at the end of the season criticised the requirement for teams from so far afield to have to repeatedly travel to the capital, which put them at a severe disadvantage against London-based clubs.

17 February 1872

Crystal Palace	0–0	Royal Engineers

Kennington Oval, London
5 March 1872
15:40

Queen's Park	0–0	Wanderers

Kennington Oval, London

=== Replays ===
Royal Engineers secured the second place in the final by defeating Crystal Palace at the second attempt. The game was reasonably even at first, with attempts being made on both goals, but the military team began to dominate and took the lead through Hugh Mitchell. Following what The Morning Post called "some of the most spirited play ever witnessed", Renny-Tailyour scored twice to give the Engineers a 3–0 victory.

9 March 1872

Royal Engineers	3–0	Crystal Palace
Hugh Mitchell; Henry Renny-Tailyour

Kennington Oval, London

Wanderers	walkover from	Queen's Park (withdrew)

== Final ==
The final took place at Kennington Oval on 16 March. Previewing the game, The Morning Post described the Wanderers team as "the crème de la crème of the Association players" and noted that in the earlier rounds of the competition, some of their best players had been unavailable, but that they were expected to be at full strength for the final. The writer also commented on the Royal Engineers' preferred tactic of passing the ball between players, a style then known as the "Combination Game" and considered innovative; most teams at the time relied on players making long runs while dribbling the ball. The Field wrote that "the general feeling [...] seemed to be in favour of a victory for the Sappers", using a traditional nickname of the Corps of Royal Engineers.

Alcock, the captain of the Wanderers team, won the coin toss and chose to begin the game defending the goal at the western end of the ground, meaning that the military team initially had the wind and sun in their faces. Ten minutes after kick-off, a melee took place and Edmund Creswell of Royal Engineers suffered a broken collarbone; he refused to leave the pitch and played the rest of the game in obvious discomfort. (Note: The concept of substitutes was not introduced to English football until the 1960s; previously, an injured player had to play on or else the team had to continue with a reduced number of players.) Wanderers took the lead fifteen minutes into the game when Walpole Vidal made a long dribbling run before passing the ball to Morton Betts, who, according to The Field, "was able to effect the reduction of the military goal with but little difficulty". Betts had chosen to play under the assumed name "A.H. Chequer", referencing his membership of the Harrow Chequers club. After twenty minutes Alcock put the ball past goalkeeper William Merriman, but the goal was disallowed because Charles Wollaston had handled the ball in the build-up.

Wanderers continued to exert pressure, but Merriman's skill prevented them from increasing their lead; The Field wrote that "so resolute was the front offered by Capt. Merriman [...] and so judicious his defence that further reverses were averted". The newspaper described his overall performance as "perfect". A shot from a Wanderers player hit one of the goalposts following "a protracted bully [which] raged on the very edge of the Engineers' lines", in the words of The Sportsman. Despite a late rally from their opponents, Wanderers held their lead and the game ended in a 1–0 victory. The reporter for The Field called the final "the fastest and hardest match that has ever been seen at The Oval" and said that the victors displayed "some of the best play, individually and collectively, that has ever been shown in an Association game". The Morning Post described the match as one-sided and said that the soldiers "could never get within many yards of their opponents' quarters", and The Sportsman commented that they "only on two occasions endangered the enemy's goal".

16 March 1872
15:05

Wanderers	1–0	Royal Engineers
A. H. Chequer 15'

Kennington Oval, London
Attendance: 2,000 (Note: The Morning Post wrote that "a vast number of spectators" were present at the final, and The Field described the attendance as "much above average". In contrast, Bell's Life in London stated that there were "not a great number of visitors". Modern sources give an attendance figure of 2,000.)
Referee: Alfred Stair

== Aftermath ==
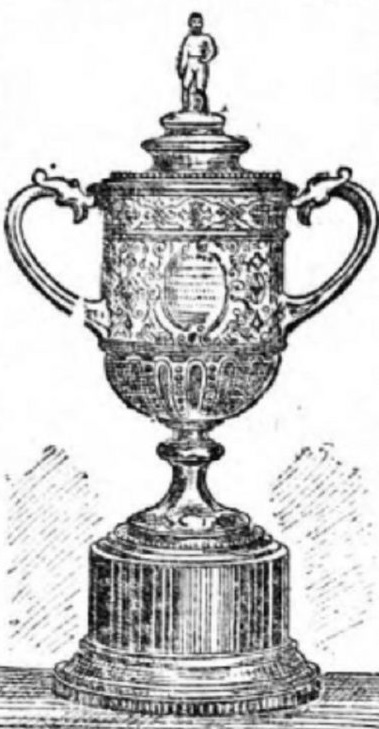
An illustration of the FA Cup trophy awarded in 1872

The trophy was presented by the President of the Football Association, Ebenezer Morley, at the annual dinner of the Wanderers club at the Pall Mall Restaurant in London on 11 April. The Football Association also gave each player in the winning team a silk badge commemorating the victory, and the club's committee presented each player with an inscribed gold medal. As cup-holders, Wanderers received a bye straight to the final of the following year's FA Cup, in keeping with the original concept of the competition being a "challenge cup"; this was the only time this rule was used.

The launch of the FA Cup, which shortly before the final The Morning Post said could now be considered "the Blue Riband of Football", was a success and contributed to greater adoption of the association rules. By 1878, the number of teams entering the competition had tripled, and by the 1890s the Oval was deemed too small to cope with the large crowds now being attracted to the final. The FA Cup continues to be contested each season and is the oldest association football competition in the world. Even after the advent of professional league football in England in 1888, winning the Cup was for decades seen as an equal achievement to winning the league championship; more recently the growing importance of the Premier League and UEFA Champions League has seen its prestige diminish.
