= Hampstead Heathens F.C. =

- Full name: Hampstead Heathens Football Club
- Nickname: the Heathens
- Founded: June 1868
- Dissolved: 1872
- Ground: 0.25 miles from Hampstead Station
- Secretary: J. P. Tatham
Home colours

Hampstead Heathens F.C. was an English football club, based in Hampstead, London. The club competed in the first ever FA Cup in 1871 and were involved in the first ever competitive replay in association football.

== History ==
The phrase "Hampstead Heathens" is found as early as 1860, used by literary critic David Masson to refer to the circle of authors, living on Hampstead Heath in the early nineteenth century, that included John Keats.

In the Football Annual, the club reported its foundation date as June 1868. In November of that year, it played a match against its neighbour N.N. Club of Kilburn. The Heathens would proceed to play against many other London clubs over the 1868–69, 1869–70 and 1870–71 seasons. The club joined the Football Association (FA) during the 1869–70 season.

The club had close links with Winchester School; in a match against the Wykehamists, five of the Heathens members played for the school side.

In 1871, the Heathens were one of the twelve teams to enter the challenge cup being organised by the FA. They received a bye into the second round of the competition, where they were drawn away to Barnes. The match finished in a 1–1 draw after being stopped by bad light, the Heathens being handicapped by playing with only 10 men. Whilst Hitchin and Crystal Palace had both been sent through after having a goalless draw in the first round, Heathens and Barnes were forced to contest a rematch, as the match had not played to time.

The match took place on 6 January 1872, again at Barnes; Hampstead Heathens triumphed 1–0, despite again having to play the match with 10 men, thanks to a late goal from G. P. Leach. The club progressed to face Royal Engineers in the quarter-final. Their cup run ended here, as they were defeated 3–0 by the team who would ultimately finish runners-up. The club was hindered by having to start the game with 9 men, as two members did not turn up, and only had 10 men for the second half.

This would prove to be the Heathens' last competitive fixture. The club did play one subsequent match a week later—a rain-sodden 3–0 defeat to Wanderers, for which the team was unable to supply a full complement of players. There is little record of the club after this match: the Heathens did not enter any subsequent competitions, nor did they contest any of the leagues which began to appear nearly two decades later. The club is absent from lists of Football Association members from 1873 onwards.

A later cricket club of the same name existed between 1921 and 1939.

== Colours ==
The club's colours were white, with blue "binding" (trim), and a blue cap.

== Ground ==
The club played on Hampstead Heath, a quarter of a mile from Hampstead Heath station.

== Notable players ==
- Henry Lake was selected to play for England in the 1871 representative match against Scotland, but fell out of the line-up before the match.
- Sherman Ralph Tatham (full-back) played for the Rest of the World side which faced the Wanderers in a challenge match to conclude the 1870–71 season, the match finishing 1–1.

== Modern day ==
An amateur club under the name Hampstead Heathens currently competes in the Southern Amateur League. This club is not related to the original, however, having been formed in 1975.
