= Hitchin F.C. =

Hitchin
- Full name: Hitchin Football Club
- Founded: 1865
- Dissolved: c. 1915
- Ground: Top Field; Hitchin
- Capacity: 4,000
- League: Last league was Spartan League
- Final Season 1910–11: 10th
Home colours

Hitchin Football Club was an English professional football club based in Hitchin, Hertfordshire. Formed in 1865 and based at Top Field, Hitchin took part in the inaugural FA Cup competition in 1871–72. Turning professional early in the twentieth century, financial worries were compounded by a fire at Top Field in 1911. The club folded soon after.

== History ==
Hitchin Football Club was formed in October 1865 and spent their formative years mainly using Dog Kennel Farm on Charlton Road, Hitchin as their home ground. A brief one-season spell at The Cricket Ground, Hitchin followed, where it's believe they played their inaugural FA Cup fixture. Ahead of the 1872/73 season, the club moved to the Bedford Road Ground - later known as Top Field.

During the aforementioned FA Cup fixture it is known that in "torrential rain", Hitchin held Crystal Palace to a 0–0 draw on the first day of the inaugural FA Cup competition on 11 November 1871. Both clubs were allowed through, and Hitchin lost 5–0 to the Royal Engineers in the next round.

The initial fixture versus Crystal Palace was one of the first two FA Cup fixtures to take place. The match in Hitchin kicked off at 15:00. Newspaper reports show that the Maidenhead vs Marlow fixture was due to kick-off at 14:30, but was delayed until 15:20, and that the Upton Park vs Clapham Rovers fixture started at 15:30.

Hitchin's ground at Top Field acquired a proud grandstand during the late 19th century, although the players were still obliged to change at The Cricketers public house across the street. The side turned professional around the turn of the century, but this was an economic folly. To make matters worse, the great grandstand burnt down in 1911. Debt-ridden, with no grandstand and little success, the club limped along until finally folding during the First World War.

This club is not to be confused with Hitchin Blue Cross who also played in the Town at this time (frequently against Hitchin). They were founded as Hitchin Blue Cross Brigade in the late 1890s and were founder members of the Herts County League in 1898–99. They changed their name to Hitchin Blue Cross in 1902 and played in the Herts County League until 1924. They were twice runners-up in the Herts Senior Cup in 1906–07 and 1920–21 and won it in 1922–23.

Hitchin Town Football Club were formed in 1928 and are generally seen as the successor to the original club and still play at Top Field.

== Colours ==
The club's colours were originally given as chocolate and magenta, and from 1869 as black and magenta, probably in hoops.

== Records ==
- Best FA Cup performance: Second round, 1871–72
