= Morton Betts =

English sportsman (1847–1914)

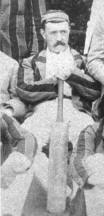

Personal information
- Full name: Morton Peto Betts
- Date of birth: 30 August 1847
- Place of birth: Bloomsbury, Middlesex, England
- Date of death: 19 April 1914 (aged 66)
- Place of death: Menton, France
- Positions: Full-back; goalkeeper

Senior career*
Years	Team	Apps	(Gls)
- Harrow Chequers
- Wanderers
- Old Harrovians

International career
1877	England	1	(0)
- * Club domestic league appearances and goals

Morton Peto Betts (30 August 1847 – 19 April 1914) was a leading English sportsman of the late 19th century. He was notable for scoring the first goal in an English FA Cup final.

== Early life ==
Betts was the son of Edward Betts of Preston Hall, Aylesford, a civil engineering contractor, and Ann Betts, née Peto. Edward was in business with Ann's brother, the railway entrepreneur Samuel Morton Peto, the pair operating as Peto and Betts until the firm was declared bankrupt in 1866. Morton was educated at Harrow School.

== Sporting life ==
Betts was an amateur footballer and cricketer. His most notable moment came when he scored the only goal in the 1872 FA Cup Final for Wanderers, the first final of the tournament. The goal was a relatively simple "tap-in", coming as a result of Walpole Vidal's successful dribble through the Royal Engineers' defence. In the match, he played under the pseudonym AH Chequer; Betts played for Harrow Chequers, a team associated with the school, who had been drawn to play Wanderers in the first round of the tournament but failed to fulfil the fixture.

Betts usually played football as a full-back, though his one appearance for England national team – against Scotland in 1877 – was as a goalkeeper. By this time, he was with the Old Harrovians Football Club. He later became a referee, helped found the Kent Football Association and was a board member of the Football Association for 20 years.

His sporting career also featured first-class cricket appearances for Middlesex (one match) and Kent County Cricket Clubs (two matches). He played club cricket, including Harrow Wanderers, Incogniti and Band of Brothers, closely associated with the Kent County club, as well as for Essex County Cricket Club in 1884, before they became a first-class county. He was secretary of Essex between 1887 and 1890 before resigning to take up the post of secretary of the newly formed British Baseball Association and as a Director of Preston North End Baseball Club in the 1890 National League of Baseball of Great Britain.

== Later life ==
He married twice, first to Jane Bouch in 1879 and then to Jane Morgan in 1901. He spent his final years living in France and died aged 66 in Menton, shortly before the outbreak of World War I.

== Bibliography ==
- Carlaw, Derek (2020). Kent County Cricketers, A to Z: Part One (1806–1914) (PDF). Cardiff: ACS.
- Giller, Norman; 2004; 'Football and all That'; Hodder and Stoughton; pp. 15–16; ISBN 0-340-83589-3
