= 1872–73 in English football =

Football in England
- Season: 1872–73

Men's football
- FA Cup: Wanderers

The 1872–73 season was the second season of competitive football in England. When the Football Association football was formed in 1863, the sport was played mainly by public schools, or teams with public school roots, and amateurism was the norm. This remained the case until the 1880s, when working-class teams began to vie for supremacy. The Football Association staged the second edition of the FA Cup, with Wanderers retaining the trophy by defeating Oxford University in the final.

The first officially recognised international football match took place on 30 November 1872 when Scotland hosted England.

== International matches ==
=== First official international ===
The Scotland v England match in November 1872 is now officially recognised by FIFA as the first-ever international football match. The Football Association (FA) had initiated five matches between English and Scottish players since 1870, but those are now rated as representative games only because the Scotland teams consisted entirely of Anglo-Scots.

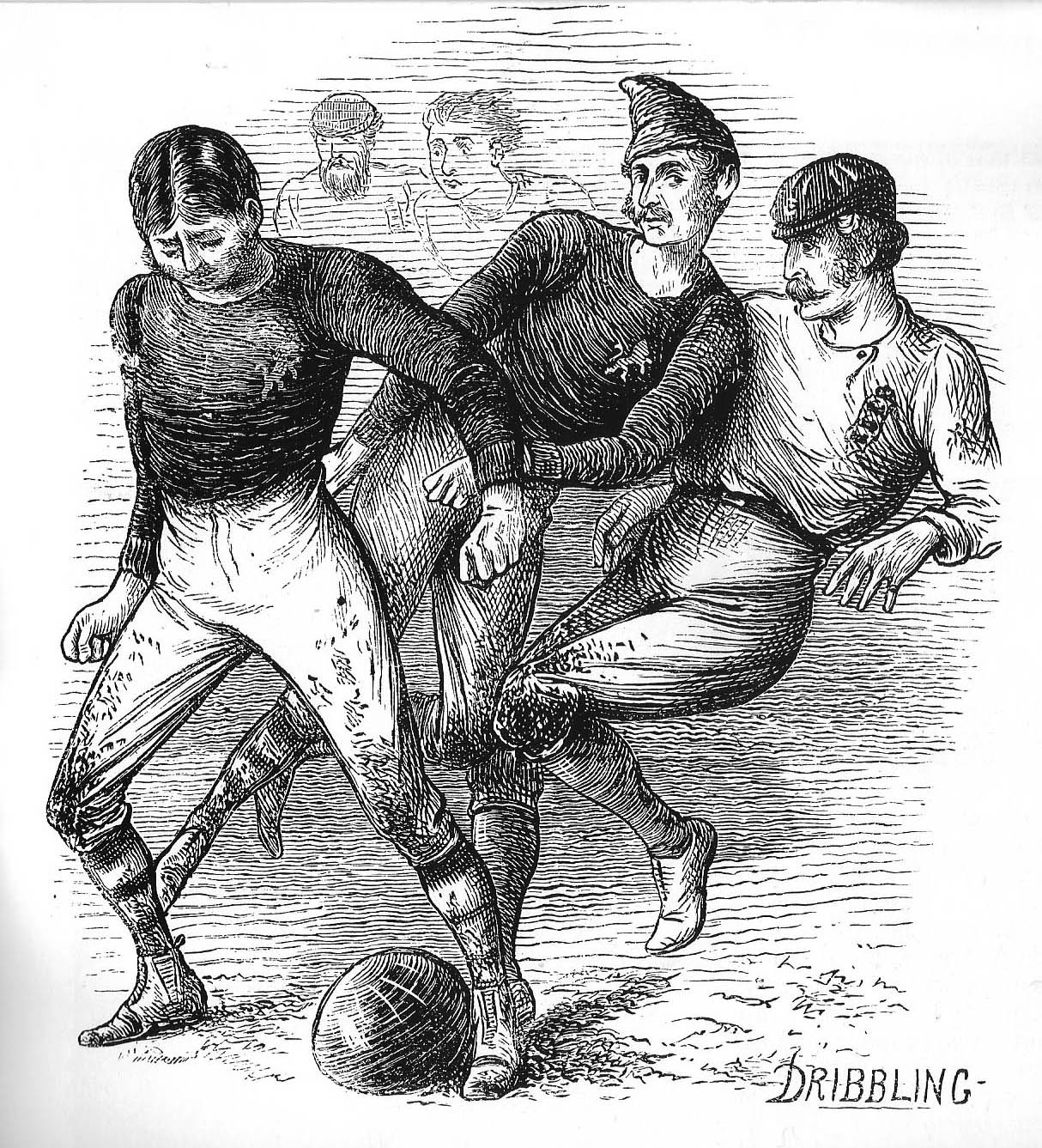
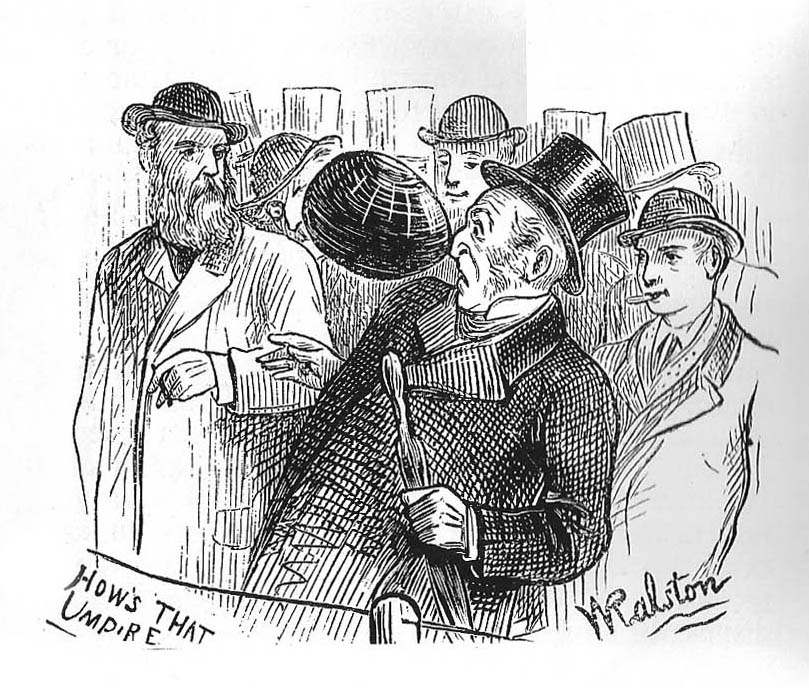
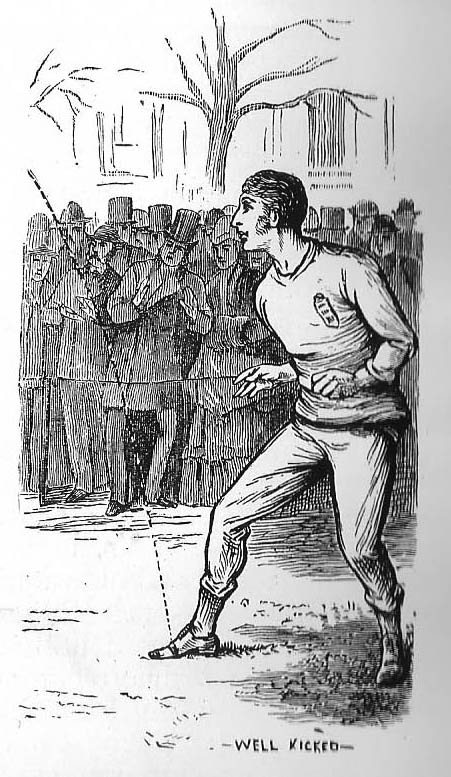
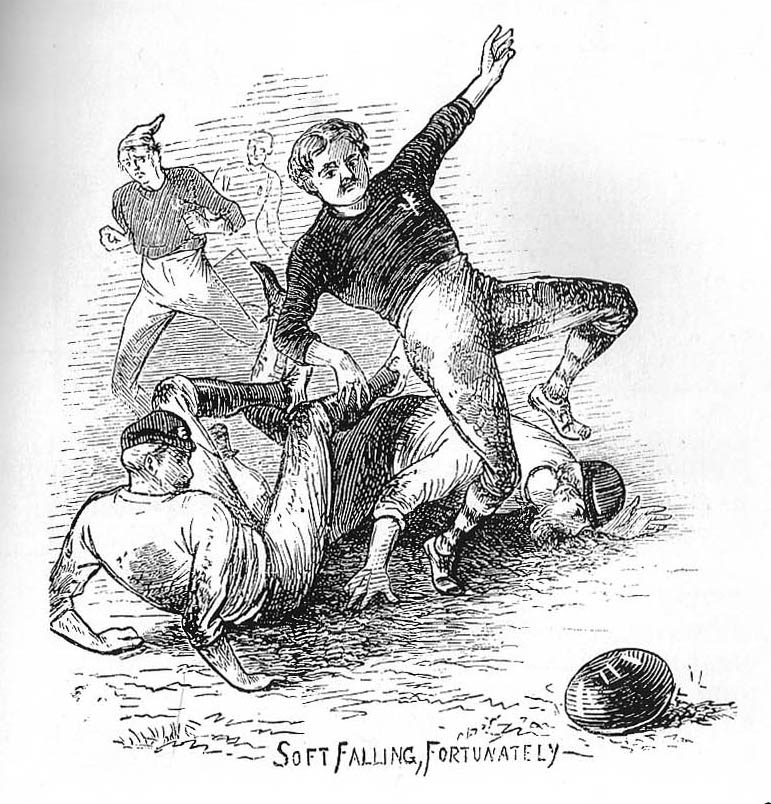
Illustrations of the first international at Hamilton Crescent, by William Ralston.

The first international match that is now officially recognised took place after Queen's Park, the leading Scottish club at the time, invited the FA to select an England team to face a Scotland team (which, as they selected it, consisted entirely of Queen's Park players). The match took place at the Hamilton Crescent cricket ground in Partick, Glasgow on 30 November 1872 and ended in a 0–0 draw in front of around 4,000 spectators. England's team was captained by Cuthbert Ottaway of Oxford University and consisted of players from eight different clubs and one Army regiment.

=== Return fixture ===
The FA hosted a return match at Kennington Oval on 8 March 1873, now officially rated the first international match in England. England adopted Scotland's 2–2–6 formation but retained only two of the players who had appeared in the November match. These were Harwood Greenhalgh of Notts County in defence and Charles Chenery of the original Crystal Palace club in attack. This team had a strong Wanderers influence with Leonard Howell, Walpole Vidal, Alexander Bonsor, William Kenyon-Slaney and Hubert Heron all selected (there were no Wanderers players in the Glasgow match). Of those, however, only Heron would play more than two matches for England. The other players selected were Alexander Morten in goal, William Clegg (whose brother Charlie had played in the previous match) and two Royal Engineers, Pelham von Donop and Alfred Goodwyn.

=== Summary of England results ===
Date	Opposition	Venue	Competition	Result	Score
30 November 1872	Scotland	Hamilton Crescent, Partick, Glasgow	Friendly	Drew	0–0
8 March 1873	Scotland	Kennington Oval, London	Friendly	Won	4–2

=== Scottish FA founded ===
The Scotland team lacked funding and could only raise enough money to cover rail fares for eight players to travel. Their team was augmented by three of the Anglo-Scots who had appeared in the representative matches: A. F. Kinnaird, John Blackburn and Henry Renny-Tailyour. The match ended in a 4–2 victory for England with Kenyon-Slaney scoring the first-ever international goal. The Scottish Football Association was belatedly formed on 13 March, five days after the second match, and assumed responsibility for running the Scotland team.

== FA Cup ==
In the second edition of the FA Cup, the rules granted automatic qualification to the final for the holders, Wanderers, on a challenge basis similar to that employed in boxing. The final was played on 29 March 1873 at Lillie Bridge, a ground which the Wanderers sometimes used as their home venue. Wanderers retained the trophy with a 2–0 victory over Oxford University. The challenge rule was scrapped after this match so that, in 1874, Wanderers began their defence in the first round with all other entrants.

Oxford University came through four rounds to reach the final. In turn, they defeated Crystal Palace at home 3–2, Clapham Rovers away 3–0 and Royal Engineers at home 1–0. In the semi-final, they were due to play Queen's Park but the Scottish club withdrew and Oxford University went into the final on a walkover.

== Honours ==
Competition	Winners	Runners-up	Venue	Result
FA Cup	Wanderers (2*/0)	Oxford University (0/1)	Lillie Bridge	2–0

(Note: figures in parentheses display the club's tournament record as winners/runners-up. * indicates a new record for most competition wins.)
