= William Stafford (British Army officer) =

British Army officer

Brigadier-General William Stafford CB
- Born: 19 December 1854; Hansi, India
- Died: 8 August 1942 (aged 87); Crowthorne, Berkshire, England
- Burial place: St. John the Baptist Church, Crowthorne
- Military career
- Allegiance: United Kingdom
- Branch: British Army
- Service years: 1873–1911, 1915–1918
- Rank: Brigadier-General
- Unit: Royal Engineers
- Commands: Commanding Royal Engineer, North-Western District; Chief Engineer Southern Command; Officer Commanding South Irish Coastal Defences
- Awards: C.B.

Brigadier-General William Francis Howard Stafford CB (19 December 1854 – 8 August 1942) was a British Army officer who served with the Royal Engineers in various campaigns in the late 19th and early 20th centuries. Towards the end of his career, he was in command of the South Irish coastal defences.

In his youth, he was a keen amateur sportsman and played rugby football for England against Scotland in 1874 and association football for the Royal Engineers, being on the winning side in the 1875 FA Cup Final.

== Family and education ==
Stafford was born at Hansi, in what is now the Indian state of Haryana, on 19 December 1854 into a military family. His father was William Joseph Fitzmaurice Stafford (c.1820–1887), a major-general in the Bengal Staff Corps, who was the son of Major-General John Stafford (1785–1846). John Stafford was the cousin of Berkeley Buckingham Stafford (1797–1847) (High Sheriff of Louth in 1828), the father of Sir Edward Stafford (1819–1901), who served three terms as the Prime Minister of New Zealand.

Stafford's mother, Emily Mary (c.1832–1909) was the daughter of Major Gavin Young, Judge Advocate General with the East India Company.

William's two brothers also joined the Royal Engineers. Henry Laurence Caulfeild Howard Stafford (1859–1948) retired in 1909 with the rank of lieutenant-colonel while their younger brother Edmund Hyde Boyle Whalley Howard Stafford (1868–1940) retired in 1912 as a major.

Stafford was educated at Wellington College from 1867 to 1871, before enrolling at the Royal Military Academy, Woolwich in 1872.

== Sporting career ==
Stafford played rugby at both Wellington College and the Royal Military Academy, before joining Richmond Rugby Club. On 23 February 1874, aged 19 years 66 days, he earned his only Rugby cap when he was selected to play for England against Scotland in the international match at Kennington Oval, which ended in a 1–0 victory for England.

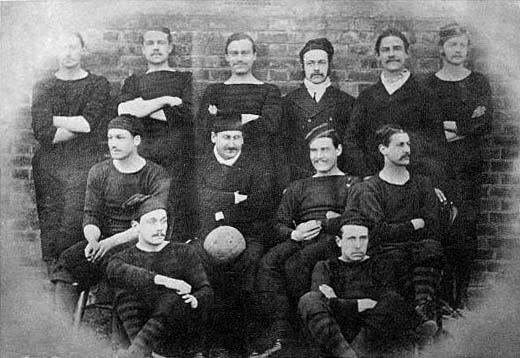
The Royal Engineers team of 1875. Stafford is third from the left in the back row.

On joining the Royal Engineers in 1873, Stafford commenced playing association football, becoming a "resolute forward, working to the very last", although he was "a little too fond of a charge". At this time, the Royal Engineers were among the top football teams in England, having reached the final of the first FA Cup tournament in 1872 and again two years later, finishing on both occasions as runners-up. In the run to the 1875 final, Stafford scored twice in the early rounds in a 5–0 victory over Cambridge University and in the next match, a 3–2 victory over Clapham Rovers. This set up a hard-fought semi-final against Oxford University in which the Engineers emerged victorious with a 1–1 draw followed by a 1–0 victory in the replay, thus reaching the FA Cup Final for the third time in four years.

In the final, played on 13 March 1875 at Kennington Oval, the Engineers met the Old Etonians. The match was played in a strong gale and the Engineers spent most of the match against the gale, with the rules requiring ends to be changed after each goal. Alexander Bonsor scored for the Old Boys after 30 minutes followed by an equaliser from Capt Renny-Tailyour within five minutes. Shortly after the equaliser, Lt. Ruck collided with Cuthbert Ottaway who was forced to leave the field with a serious ankle injury; in his absence, the Old Boys were regarded as fortunate to have held on for a 1–1 draw.

The replay was three days later; although the Engineers were able to field the same eleven as in the first match, the Etonians had to make four changes, losing the match 2–0, with both the Engineers' goals scored by Capt Renny-Tailyour.^{a} At the third attempt, the Royal Engineers won their first, and only, FA Cup Final.

Stafford was also a keen cricketer and played for the Royal Military Academy in 1873 and for Norfolk in 1889, as well as for the Royal Engineers.

== Military career ==
Stafford graduated from the Royal Military Academy after a year, when he was commissioned as a lieutenant in the Royal Engineers from 29 April 1873. Stafford spent the first two years of his military service at Chatham before being sent to Roorkee in India in February 1876, to join the Bengal Sappers & Miners.

From late 1878, he served in the Second Anglo-Afghan War when he was in command of the 6th (Field Telegraph) Company, Bengal Sappers & Miners with the 1st Division Peshawar Valley Field Force, under Lieut.-General Sir Samuel Browne, until the end of the first campaign in February 1879, during which he accompanied the expeditions to Maidanak and the Lughman valley. His company was responsible for laying field telegraphs, road making and fortifying posts on the lines of communication, including laying the first telegraph cables to Gandamak ahead of the advanced guard. During the second campaign, he was assistant field engineer with the Khyber Line Force under Brigadier-General Charles Arbuthnot, when he took part in the advance to Kata Sang in late 1879, and in December was present at Pezwan during the disturbances there, before accompanying the Hissarak valley expedition in April 1880. For his services in the Afghan War, Stafford was awarded the Afghanistan Medal and mentioned in dispatches.

Stafford returned to Afghanistan with the Bengal Sappers & Miners in April 1881, as part of the Second Column of the Mahsud-Waziri Expeditionary Force under the command of Brigadier-General John James Hood Gordon. This was an attempt to subdue the Waziri tribesman who had frequently attacked the British settlement at Tank close to the Indian border with Afghanistan, the "North-West Frontier". For his services on the expedition, Stafford was again mentioned in despatches.

In October 1882, Stafford returned to England, taking up the post of Assistant Instructor in Survey at the School of Military Engineering at Chatham in March 1883, despite still being a subaltern. He was promoted to captain on 8 January 1885. He remained at the School of Military Engineering until March 1888, when he was posted to Colchester for two years.

In April 1890, Stafford was posted to Egypt, remaining there until November 1894, having been promoted to major on 13 November 1892, before a brief posting to Malta, returning to Chatham in March 1895. Over the next four years, he was posted to various bases across the British Isles, including serving at The Curragh in Ireland from October 1886 to January 1899.

Stafford was posted to South Africa in October 1899 to serve in the Second Boer War, in command of the 26th Field Company, Royal Engineers, where he participated in the advance on the Boer capital at Bloemfontein, including the engagements at Poplar Grove and Karee Siding in March 1900, after which he was promoted to lieutenant colonel from 14 April 1900, remaining in the Transvaal until August 1902. For his services during the operations in South Africa, Stafford was mentioned in despatches and received the Queen's South Africa Medal with three clasps, and the King's South Africa Medal with two clasps, before being appointed a Companion of the Most Honourable Order of the Bath (C.B.) on 26 June 1902.

On his return to the UK, Stafford spent time in command of the Royal Engineers at Victoria Barracks, Cork from October 1902 to January 1903, and Chester, as Commanding Royal Engineer, North-Western District from January 1903 to April 1905, receiving promotion to brevet-colonel on 10 February 1904. In April 1905, on completion of five years' service as a regimental Lieutenant-Colonel, Stafford was placed on half-pay. He was restored to full pay on 8 August 1906, when he was appointed Chief Engineer for the Southern Command based at Salisbury, gaining the temporary rank of Brigadier-General on 5 October 1907.

On 19 December 1911, Stafford retired and was awarded the honorary rank of brigadier-general on 5 October 1912 .

=== First World War service ===
Following the outbreak of the First World War, Stafford offered his services to the army, and on 6 June 1915, he was appointed Officer Commanding South Irish Coastal Defences, based at Victoria Barracks, Cork, with the rank of brigadier-general. In April 1916, at the outset of the Easter Rising. Stafford was involved in an incident concerning Tomás Mac Curtain, the commander of the Irish Volunteers in Cork, who had occupied the volunteer hall, which had been surrounded by British troops. Stafford appointed his aide-de-camp, Captain F. W. Dickie, to negotiate terms with Mac Curtain for the temporary surrender of his forces' weapons to enable the hall to be vacated. In the event, the arms were not returned but Mac Curtain was arrested and imprisoned.

On 26 July 1917, Stafford was graded for purposes of pay as a staff captain, and retired finally on 11 April 1918.

== Marriage and children ==
On 9 February 1884, at Holy Trinity Church, Brompton, 29-year old William Stafford married 24-year old Edith Mary Culling Carr (1859–1931), the daughter of Francis Culling Carr-Gomm and his late wife, Jeanie. Edith's half-brother was Hubert Carr-Gomm, who became M.P. for Rotherhithe in 1906.

The couple had four children:

- Janet Elsie Howard (1885–1980)
- Lucy Edith Howard (1886–1966)
- Ursula Howard (1888–1982)
- John Howard (1890–1976)

John followed his father into the Royal Engineers, retiring with the rank of brigadier. He was appointed O.B.E. in the 1945 Birthday Honours.

== Death ==
Stafford died at his home, "Thornbury" in Crowthorne, Berkshire on 8 August 1942. He was buried at St. John the Baptist Church, Crowthorne alongside his wife, Edith, who had died 11 years earlier.

== Notes ==
- ^aSeveral modern sources claim that Stafford scored the second goal in the replay, but no contemporaneous reports support this, most of which report that the ball crossed the line in a goalmouth scramble. In his obituary in the Royal Engineers' Journal published in February 1922, the biographer credits Renny-Tailyour with both goals in the replay.

== Bibliography ==
- Collett, Mike (2003). The Complete Record of the FA Cup. Sports Books. ISBN 1-899807-19-5.
- Gibbons, Philip (2001). Association Football in Victorian England – A History of the Game from 1863 to 1900. Upfront Publishing. ISBN 1-84426-035-6.
- Warsop, Keith (30 November 2004). The Early F.A. Cup Finals and the Southern Amateurs. Nottingham: SoccerData. ISBN 978-1899468782.
