= Alexander Mein =

British Army officer

- Born: 15 July 1854; York, England
- Died: 30 November 1927 (aged 73); St Mary Bourne, Hampshire, England
- Burial place: St. Peter's Church, St Mary Bourne, Hampshire
- Military career
- Allegiance: United Kingdom
- Branch: British Army
- Service years: 1873–1911
- Rank: Colonel
- Unit: Royal Engineers
- Conflicts: Anglo-Afghan War

Colonel Alexander Lechmere Mein (15 July 1854 – 30 November 1927) was a British Army officer who served with the Royal Engineers in the late 19th and early 20th centuries, spending the majority of his career in India. The only active service that he saw was during the Anglo-Afghan War in 1878 to 1880. In his youth, he was a keen amateur sportsman and played association football for the Royal Engineers, being on the winning side in the 1875 FA Cup Final.

== Family and education ==
Mein was born on 15 July 1854 at York, where his father, Major George Mein (1817–1896) was brigade major with the 21st Dragoons. Mein's mother, Marianne (1815–1885), was the daughter of Frederick Coore, a solicitor.

Mein was educated at Wellington College, Berkshire before enrolling at the Royal Military Academy, Woolwich in 1872.

== Sporting career ==
Mein played association football at Wellington College and for the Royal Military Academy before joining the Royal Engineers in 1873, where he was described as a "brilliant" inside-left, who "worked untiringly", "making many good runs". Mein also played rugby for Richmond Rugby Club in 1874.

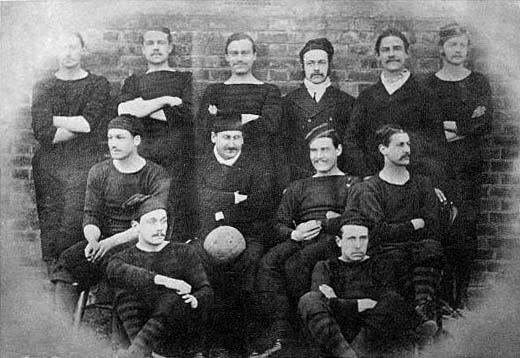
The Royal Engineers team of 1875. Mein is second from right in the back row.

At this time, the Royal Engineers were among the top football teams in England, having reached the final of the first FA Cup tournament in 1872 and again two years later, finishing on both occasions as runners-up. In the run to the 1875 final, Mein scored in a 3–2 victory over Clapham Rovers on 30 January 1875, helping to set up a semi-final against Oxford University. This was hard-fought, with the Engineers emerging victorious with a 1–1 draw followed by a 1–0 victory in the replay, thus reaching the FA Cup Final for the third time in four years.

In the final, played on 13 March 1875 at Kennington Oval, the Engineers met the Old Etonians. The match was played in a strong gale and the Engineers spent most of the match against the gale, with the rules requiring ends to be changed after each goal. Alexander Bonsor scored for the Old Boys after 30 minutes followed by an equaliser from Capt Renny-Tailyour within five minutes. Shortly after the equaliser, Lt. Ruck collided with Cuthbert Ottaway who was forced to leave the field with a serious ankle injury; in his absence, the Old Boys were regarded as fortunate to have held on for a 1–1 draw.

The replay was three days later; although the Engineers were able to field the same eleven as in the first match, the Etonians had to make four changes, losing the match 2–0, with both the Engineers' goals scored by Capt Renny-Tailyour. At the third attempt, the Royal Engineers won their first, and only, FA Cup Final.

== Military career ==
Mein graduated from the Royal Military Academy after a year, when he was commissioned as a lieutenant in the Royal Engineers from 29 April 1873. Mein spent the first three years of his military service at Chatham before being sent to India in September 1876.

In November 1878, Mein took part in the Anglo-Afghan War as assistant field engineer with the 2nd Division Peshawar Valley Field Force, and was involved in the opening battle of the war at Ali Masjid. Subsequently, Mein and the Royal Engineers were engaged in building forts along the lines of communication. Mein returned to Afghanistan, as assistant field engineer with the Khyber Line Force, for the second phase of the war in October 1879, taking part in the Wazir Khugianis Expedition, the Hissarak Expedition in April 1880 and the Lughman Valley Expedition in May 1880. For his services in the war, Mein was mentioned in dispatches and received the Afghanistan Medal.

Mein remained in Bengal for most of the remainder of his military career, receiving promotion to captain on 8 January 1885 and to major on 1 October 1892,

Mein returned to England in June 1893, and was posted to Portsmouth, before returning to India in February 1895. He was further promoted to lieutenant colonel from 24 January 1900 and to brevet colonel on 24 January 1904.

Mein retired on an Indian pension of £700 per annum on 15 July 1911.

== Marriage and children ==
On 1 June 1887, at St Paul's Church, Sarisbury, near Titchfield, Hampshire, Mein married Alice Ellen Turner-Irton (1861–1934). The marriage service was conducted by the Dean of Winchester, The Very Reverend George Kitchin. Ellen's father, Robert Lambert Turner-Irton (1825–1901) was a retired captain with the 87th Royal Irish Fusiliers.

Alexander and Alice Mein had six children:

- Evelyn May (born in Jabalpur on 3 August 1888, died at six weeks old)
- Gladys Irton (born in Jabalpur on 21 December 1889)
- Lechmere Irton (born in Mussoorie on 18 April 1892)
- Robert George (born in Alverstoke, Hampshire on 9 September 1894)
- Dudley Gerald (born in Chakrata on 1 May 1898)
- Leslie Coore (born in Lausanne, Switzerland on 25 April 1901)

Lieutenant Dudley Mein MC served with the 31st Duke of Connaught's Own Lancers during the First World War and was killed on 26 October 1918 near Aleppo in Syria.

== Death ==
Alexander Mein died on 30 November 1927 at the family home at Gang Bridge, St Mary Bourne near Andover, Hampshire. His funeral was held at St. Peter's Church at St Mary Bourne on 3 December 1927.

== Bibliography ==
- Collett, Mike (2003). The Complete Record of the FA Cup. Sports Books. ISBN 1-899807-19-5.
- Gibbons, Philip (2001). Association Football in Victorian England – A History of the Game from 1863 to 1900. Upfront Publishing. ISBN 1-84426-035-6.
- Warsop, Keith (30 November 2004). The Early F.A. Cup Finals and the Southern Amateurs. Nottingham: SoccerData. ISBN 978-1899468782.
