= George Hamilton Sim =

British Army officer

- Born: 19 November 1852; Paddington, London, England
- Died: 27 December 1929 (aged 77); Pontefract, Yorkshire, England
- Burial place: Ocklynge Cemetery, Eastbourne, England
- Military career
- Allegiance: United Kingdom
- Branch: British Army
- Service years: 1872–1918
- Rank: Colonel
- Unit: Royal Engineers
- Awards: C.B., C.M.G.

Colonel George Hamilton Sim CB CMG (19 November 1852 – 27 December 1929) was a British Army officer who served with the Royal Engineers in various campaigns in the 19th and early 20th centuries. In his youth, he was a keen amateur sportsman and played association football for the Royal Engineers, being on the winning side in the 1875 FA Cup Final.

== Family and education ==
Sim was born on 19 November 1852 at Paddington, London, the second son of Alexander Sim (1820–1885), a timber broker. Sim's mother, Agnes (1827–1909) was the daughter of Archibald Billing, a doctor and author. He was baptised on 23 March 1853 at St James's Church, Paddington.

Two of Sim's uncles, Edward Coysgarne Sim (1838–1900) and Charles Alexander Sim (1839–1897) served with the Royal Engineers, both reaching the rank of major-general.

Sim was educated at Rugby School before attending the Royal Military Academy, Woolwich.

== Football career ==
Sim played Association football at Rugby School and at the Royal Military Academy before joining the Royal Engineers in 1872. Described as ""a very useful back", Sim played as a full back; he was a pioneer in the art of heading the ball.

When Sim joined the Royal Engineers, they were among the top football teams in England, having reached the final of the first FA Cup tournament in 1872 and again two years later, finishing on both occasions as runners-up.

The Engineers reached the FA Cup Final for the third time in four years in 1875 but only after a hard semi-final against Oxford University, with a 1–1 draw followed by a 1–0 victory in the replay. In the final, played on 13 March 1875 at Kennington Oval, the Engineers met the Old Etonians. The match was played in a strong gale and the Engineers spent most of the match against the gale, with the rules requiring ends to be changed after each goal. Alexander Bonsor scored for the Old Boys after 30 minutes followed by an equaliser from Capt Renny-Tailyour within five minutes. Shortly after the equaliser, Richard Ruck collided with Cuthbert Ottaway who was forced to leave the field with a serious ankle injury; in his absence, the Old Boys were regarded as fortunate to have held on for a 1–1 draw.

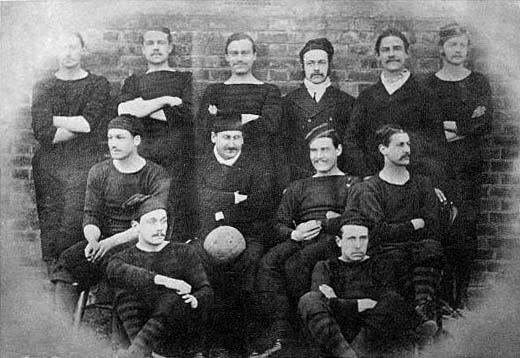
The Royal Engineers team of 1875. Sim is seated on the ground on the left.

The replay was three days later; although the Engineers were able to field the same eleven as in the first match, the Etonians had to make four changes, losing the match 2–0, with both the Engineers' goals scored by Capt Renny-Tailyour. At the third attempt, the Royal Engineers won their first, and only, FA Cup Final.

== Military career ==
Sim graduated from RMA Woolwich on 12 September 1872, when he was commissioned as a lieutenant. He spent the first three years in the army based at Chatham, Kent, before joining the Indian Service in August 1875.

On 23 September 1875, Sim was sent to northern India, where he was to remain for the next nine years. In October 1879, he was appointed Assistant Field Engineer in the Northern Afghanistan Field Force, to participate in the second phase of the Afghan War for which he received the Afghanistan Medal.

Sim returned to England in August 1884, to become an instructor at the Royal School of Military Engineering in Chatham, being promoted to captain on 12 September 1884. In March 1885, Sim was sent to Sudan with the second Suakin Expedition. In Suakin, Sim was a member of the 10th Railway Company, Royal Engineers under the command of Major William Rathbone, and were responsible for the construction of an 18-inch gauge railway system around the town. For his services in Sudan, he was awarded the Egypt Medal with clasp, together with the Khedive's Star.

Following his return to England, Sim was assigned to the Ordnance Survey based at Derby in April 1886, where he served for the following five years. He returned to the School of Military Engineering in April 1891, becoming an instructor in tactics, and being promoted to major on 16 March 1892. Sim remained at Chatham until June 1898, when he rejoined the Ordnance Survey, and was posted to Dublin.

On 4 October 1899, Sim was promoted to lieutenant-colonel, following which he was sent to South Africa in November as Commander Royal Engineers with the 5th Division, part of the Natal Field Force. Immediately on his arrival in South Africa, he led the Royal Engineers at the Relief of Ladysmith, including the operations of 17 to 24 January 1900, and the action at Spion Kop. This was followed by the operations on 5 to 7 February at Vaal Krantz and the Battle of the Tugela Heights from 14 to 27 February and the subsequent action at Pieters Hill, before the British finally defeated the Boers and entered Ladysmith on 1 March. Sim's actions during this phase of the Second Boer War earned him a brief mention in despatches from Lieutenant-General Sir Charles Warren.

During the remainder of 1900, Sim commanded the Royal Engineers in various operations in Transvaal and Natal, including the action at Laing's Nek on 6 to 9 June, before moving into the Orange River Colony at the end of the year, where he remained for the duration of the war. For his services in South Africa, Sim was mentioned in despatches three times by Lord Roberts, following which, on 19 April 1901, he was appointed a Companion of the Most Honourable Order of the Bath (C.B.). He also received the Queen's South Africa Medal with six clasps, and the King's South Africa Medal with two clasps,

In May 1902, Sim returned to Ireland to resume his service with the Ordnance Survey until October 1904, when he was placed on half-pay, having been promoted to Brevet colonel on 1 October 1903. On 19 June 1905, he was appointed Colonel in charge of Royal Engineer Records, and placed in command of the Royal Engineer Depot at Chatham, with the substantive rank of Colonel in the Army. He vacated his appointment as Officer in charge of Royal Engineer Records and was placed on half pay on 19 June 1909, before retiring on 19 November 1909.

=== First World War service ===
Following the outbreak of the First World War, Sim was appointed as an Officer in charge of Army Records. On 30 June 1915, he was attached to Headquarters as Chief Engineer for the duration of the war.

In the 1917 New Year Honours, he was appointed a Companion of the Most Distinguished Order of Saint Michael and Saint George (CMG), "in recognition of [his] valuable services in connection with the war".

== Marriage and children ==
On 5 August 1875 at St. Paul's Church, Wokingham, Sim married Bessie Katherine Hayward (1854–1927). The couple had five children:

- Evelyn Mabel Hayward, born 30 June 1876.
- Violet Bessie Hayward, born 20 July 1878, died 3 April 1880.
- Agnes Gwynneth Amy, born 19 April 1882.
- George Edward Herman, born 15 August 1886.
- Noel Eric Hayward, born 14 December 1890.

Both the sons served in the Army: George served with the Royal Engineers, reaching the rank of brigadier, while Noel became a lieutenant-colonel in the York and Lancaster Regiment.

== Death ==
At Christmas 1929, Sim was visiting his younger son, Noel, at his home in Pontefract, Yorkshire. On 27 December, he was found dead on the floor of his bedroom, having collapsed with heart failure. His funeral was held at St Anne's Church, Eastbourne, East Sussex on 2 January 1930. His body was interred at Ocklynge Cemetery.

In 2015, Sim's 1897 Royal Engineers Sword came up for auction at Mullock's Auctioneers in Shropshire, but was not sold.

== Bibliography ==
- Collett, Mike (2003). The Complete Record of the FA Cup. Sports Books. ISBN 1-899807-19-5.
- Gibbons, Philip (2001). Association Football in Victorian England – A History of the Game from 1863 to 1900. Upfront Publishing. ISBN 1-84426-035-6.
- Warsop, Keith (30 November 2004). The Early F.A. Cup Finals and the Southern Amateurs. Nottingham: SoccerData. ISBN 978-1899468782.
