= Gerald Onslow =

British Army officer

Personal information
- Full name: Gerald Charles Penrice Onslow
- Date of birth: 7 February 1853
- Place of birth: Deyrah, India
- Date of death: 16 April 1909 (aged 56)
- Place of death: Crowborough, East Sussex
- Position: Half-back

Senior career*
Years	Team	Apps	(Gls)
1874–76	Royal Engineers		
- * Club domestic league appearances and goals

Colonel Gerald Charles Penrice Onslow (2 February 1853 – 16 April 1909) was a British Army officer in the Royal Engineers, and an FA Cup-winning footballer.

== Early life ==
Onslow was the grandson of Sir Henry Onslow, 2nd Baronet. He was born in Dehradun, British India, the son of a lieutenant in the Bengal Army, and was educated at Cheltenham School.

== Sporting career ==
Cheltenham School was not one of the traditional football-playing public schools, and Onslow's first known appearance in the game was in the fourth round 1873–74 FA Cup, for the Royal Engineers A.F.C. against Swifts, as a replacement in the half-back line for Alfred Goodwyn; the Sappers won 2–0. Goodwyn soon won back his place, but was posted to India before the 1874 FA Cup final, and Onslow was recalled to fill his position. The final was only Onslow's third match for the Sappers, having appeared in a win over Gitanos in February, before the defeat by Oxford University in the final.

Onslow however was a regular in the 1874–75 season, playing in nearly every round of the 1874–75 FA Cup, and he was considered a standout player in the 5–0 second round win over Cambridge University. He did not play in the third round win over Clapham Rovers, which meant the Sappers "suffered materially" by his absence.

The Engineers reached the 1875 FA Cup final, the third time they had reached that stage, and faced the Old Etonians at the Kennington Oval. Onslow had the honour of kicking off, and his back play "was very neat and effective and without doubt the feature of the match". The match ended 1–1, and, in the replay, Onslow – entrusted with dead-ball duties – put in a free-kick which rebounded from one of the umpires standing between the posts; given a second chance with the free-kick, Onslow dropped it in the goalmouth, and the resulting scrimmage saw the Etonians collapse under the force of the Engineers' charging, giving the Sappers the first goal. Ultimately the Royal Engineers won 2–0 and therefore took the Cup for the only time.

It was Onslow's eighth and final match in the competition. He did not play in the first round in 1875–76, and his absence from the Sappers' third-round defeat to Swifts "was a great blow to them". His final recorded match was a 3–2 win over Cambridge University at the Chatham Lines in April 1876; he was reckoned to have "showed but little falling off of his old form", but he was posted to India at the end of the year, and never seems to have come back to the sport.

Charles Alcock reckoned him "one of the most brilliant half-backs of the day, very quiet and a sure kick". However, despite playing in two Cup finals, he never received an England cap.

== Military career ==
Onslow was commissioned into the Royal Engineers as lieutenant on 29 April 1873. He served in Afghanistan in 1878–1880, was promoted to captain on 8 January 1885, and served in Burma from 1885–1887. He was subsequently promoted to major on 21 October 1892, and to lieutenant-colonel on 9 April 1900, shortly before he was appointed commanding officer of the Bombay Sappers and Miners, stationed in Khadki, British India.

== Later life ==
Onslow married Flora Frances Mary Donald on 16 November 1889 in Cheltenham. He died at Camperdown, Goldsmith's Avenue, Crowborough, in 1909. He had four sons, three of whom were killed in the First World War; the fourth, Eric Montague Onslow, was kept as a prisoner of war for much of the conflict.

== Sporting honours ==
Royal Engineers

- FA Cup winner (1875)
- FA Cup runner-up (1874)
