= Charles Farmer (footballer) =

English footballer and solicitor (1847–1935)

Personal information
- Full name: Charles Edward Farmer
- Date of birth: 24 May 1847
- Place of birth: Cheam, Surrey
- Date of death: 23 December 1935 (aged 88)
- Place of death: Chelsea, London
- Position: Utility player (Note: Farmer was a utility player, though most often played as a goalkeeper.)

Senior career*
Years	Team	Apps	(Gls)
1869–1875	Gitanos		
1869	Crusaders		
1869–1870	West Kent		
1874–1875	Old Etonians		
- * Club domestic league appearances and goals

Charles Edward Farmer (24 May 1847 - 23 December 1935) was a footballer and solicitor, who won an FA Cup runners-up medal.

== Early life ==
Farmer was born in the family home, Nonsuch Mansion in Cheam, in 1847 and, after early education at Cheam School, went up to Eton College in 1861, where he was a contemporary of Arthur Kinnaird.

Unlike most of his Etonian team-mates, Farmer did not enter further education; indeed he left Eton after only two years to enter the legal world. He started undertaking his articles with a solicitor in Mayfair in 1864. After qualification he worked in the Chancery Register's Office.

== Football career ==
Despite his short tenure at Eton, he evidently made enough of an impression at games to be selected by Kinnaird to play for an early Old Etonians line-up against Wanderers in January 1869; the game ended in a draw.

=== Gitanos ===
With the Old Etonian side still something of a rara avis, Farmer instead played for the Gitanos, for which old Etonians were eligible, from 1869 to 1875, usually as a back or goalkeeper, for which he was most noted. From 1871 he was the regular captain, and from 1873 he took over the club's secretaryship, making him responsible for arranging fixtures and choosing players. His first recorded goal for the club came in a 3–1 win over the Civil Service in November 1872.

=== Other clubs ===
In an era in which club membership was not exclusive and players could turn out for numerous sides, Farmer played at least one match for the Crusaders, a club for old Etonians and Westminsters. He also played for the West Kent Football Club against the Wanderers in 1869 and 1870, in line-ups that were mostly made up of Etonians (including Kinnaird and Morton Betts); the second game, with Edgar Lubbock as captain, was the first-ever association match at the Kennington Oval, and West Kent won 2–0, with two goals from Charles Nepean.

=== Representative honours ===
Farmer was never considered good enough to play for the Wanderers, although he did score against them for the Gitanos (despite his side being a man short) in a 2–2 draw in 1873 and in a 1–1 draw in January 1875, and he represented the Surrey FA against the Middlesex FA in 1873. The closest he came to national honours was playing in goal in a trial match in February 1875. Despite his goalkeeping being "a feature of the match", he was never even selected as a reserve.

=== Competitive football ===
Farmer's devotion to the Gitanos was such that his competitive debut was in the club's only Cup tie, a defeat at Uxbridge, the Gitanos hindered both by only having 8 men at kick-off, and by Farmer being "much injured" during the game.

The highlight of his career came in the 1874–75 FA Cup; Gitanos did not enter, but Kinnaird, as captain of the Old Etonians, recruited him to play in goal for the O.E. in Cup ties. He kept clean sheets in the three ties he played in goal - the only goal the Etonians conceded en route to the 1875 FA Cup final was in a 1–1 draw with the Swifts, at a time when he had been temporarily relieved of the goalkeeping spot by Philpott, who was bundled over the goal-line by three Swifts as he fumbled a cross. He did not play in goal in the semi-final against the Shropshire Wanderers, Kinnaird moving him to half-back and putting Quintin Hogg in goal. This proved to be a genius move as it was Farmer's run and pass which created the winning goal for Alexander Bonsor.

Farmer returned to the goal for the final, against the Royal Engineers, which ended 1–1, but injury and unavailability meant the Etonians had to bring in four replacements for the replay. Farmer was moved to centre-forward as a result, and nearly scored, a shot of his just clearing the tape, but the unchanged Engineers eventually scored twice to take the trophy.

=== Close of career ===
Farmer only played one more Cup tie, in goal for the Etonians in their 4–1 win over the Pilgrims in the first round the next year, Quintin Hogg eventually taking over the berth. As his playing career wound down, Farmer found himself in demand as an umpire, including taking charge of the Varsity Match in 1874. He was also on the Football Association committee in the 1870s. Fittingly, his final match was as captain for Gitanos, playing in goal in a 4–0 defeat to the Wanderers at the Oval in November 1875.

== Later life ==
He married Emily Anne Randolph on 29 January 1885. Two of their three sons died in the First World War; the elder Charles Farmer, born in 1886, was a first-class cricketer. Their third son, Arthur, died in 1895, aged 6.

He eventually became the senior registrar of the Chancery Division of the High Court of Justice, retiring in 1920, and retained a keen interest in sport, sitting on the committees of the Marylebone Cricket Club, the Free Foresters Cricket Club, the Eton Ramblers Cricket Club, and the All England Lawn Tennis Association, as well as the FA; he was also a member of the Alpine Club. Farmer died in Chelsea in 1935. He was buried with his wife and youngest son.
