= Charles Haynes (footballer) =

English soldier and footballer (1855–1935)

Personal information
- Full name: Charles Edward Haynes
- Date of birth: 8 July 1855
- Place of birth: Hampstead, Middlesex, England
- Date of death: 29 October 1935 (aged 80)
- Place of death: Torquay, Devon, England
- Position: Forward

Senior career*
Years	Team	Apps	(Gls)
1875–1878	Royal Engineers		
- * Club domestic league appearances and goals

Charles Edward Haynes (8 July 1855 – 29 October 1935) was a British army officer in the Royal Engineers and an association footballer, who played in the 1878 FA Cup final.

== Early life ==
He was born in Hampstead in Middlesex (now Greater London), on 8 July 1855, the son of a successful builder named William Haynes, and his wife, Mary Ann (formerly Spragg). Haynes attended the Royal Military Academy and was commissioned as lieutenant in the Royal Engineers in July 1875, having scored the second highest marks on passing out for the year; future football team-mate Oliver Ruck had the fifth-highest score.

== Football career ==
Soon after joining the Engineers at Chatham, he played for the Sappers' second XI in a defeat at home to Rochester. He scored his first goals for the seconds in a 4–0 win over the obscure Gore Court club of Sittingbourne in January 1876, and stepped up to the firsts for a win over the Gitanos a week later.

He made his competitive debut as a centre-forward for the Sappers in the first round of the 1876–77 FA Cup, in a narrow 2–1 win over the Old Harrovians at the Kennington Oval. He played in all four rounds in which the Sappers took part that season, and missed out on the first two rounds of the 1877–78 FA Cup, scoring on his return to the side in a third round hammering of Druids. He also scored in the last 6 stage replay against Oxford University, and played in the final, which the Sappers lost to the Wanderers.

== Army career ==
His football career was cut short by army service; he was sent with the 2nd Field Company to South Africa in December 1878. He particularly distinguished himself by using a shaving-mirror to develop a system of heliograph signals for transmitting messages to the garrison at Ekowe. He was twice mentioned in dispatches for conduct in the Zulu War, and also took part in the Bechuanaland Expedition in 1884.

He was commissioned as captain on 28 January 1886, major on 1 October 1894, lieutenant-colonel on 15 November 1901 (when he was sent to Ireland), and colonel on 15 November 1904. He seemed to have ended his army career as Chief Engineer of the Eastern Coast defences in 1912, when he reached retirement age. However he was recalled for service in the First World War before his final retirement.

== Personal life ==
In 1890 he married Elizabeth Maude, the daughter of Sir Henry Edward Williams KCB. They had three sons. He was appointed Companion of the Military Order of the Bath in the 1911 Coronation Honours.

His home was at Roborough House on Furze Hill Road in Torquay, and he died at the Mount Stuart Nursing Home in the same town on 29 October 1935.
