= Oliver Ruck =

English soldier and footballer

Personal information
- Full name: Oliver Edwal Ruck
- Date of birth: 27 May 1851
- Place of birth: Pennal, Merionethshire, Wales
- Date of death: 24 July 1934 (aged 83)
- Place of death: Aberdovey, Gwynedd, Wales
- Position: Forward

Senior career*
Years	Team	Apps	(Gls)
1876–1878	Royal Engineers		
- * Club domestic league appearances and goals

Oliver Edwal Ruck (27 May 1851 – 24 July 1934) was a Welsh footballer and officer in the Royal Engineers, who played in the 1878 FA Cup final.

== Early life ==
Oliver Ruck was born at Pennal, Merionethshire, Wales on 27 May 1851, the fifth child and third son of Laurence Ruck (c.1820–1896), a gentleman farmer, originally from Newington in Kent. On his mother's side, he could claim descent from Owain Glyndŵr, the last Welsh native Prince of Wales.

Ruck attended the Royal Military Academy, following in the footsteps of his brother Richard Ruck, and was commissioned as lieutenant in the Royal Engineers in July 1875, having scored the fifth highest marks on passing out for the year; future football team-mate Charles Haynes had beaten him. He also won the RMA Governor's Prize that year for his skill with watercolours, as well as prizes for technical drawing - three of his future team-mates also won prizes in 1875.

== Football career ==
Richard Ruck had played in the Royal Engineers A.F.C. side which won the FA Cup in 1875. Oliver made his debut for the Sappers in goal against the Gitanos at the Prince's Cricket Ground in February 1876, and kept a clean sheet in a 2–0 victory. He only played once more in goal, and by the end of the 1875–76 season had moved up front; in April both he and Richard scored in a win for the Engineers over the Wanderers.

He made his competitive début in the second round of the 1876–77 FA Cup, playing as centre-forward in a 3–0 win at the Shropshire Wanderers. He was not a regular player - his fourth tie in the competition, and first in the 1877–78 FA Cup, was the "final six" second replay against Oxford University, in which he scored one of the Sappers' goals in a 4–2 win. He played in the semi-final and final as well, all three appearances being on the right wing. He was picked out for his "untiring" play in the final, but it was not enough as the Wanderers took the trophy with a 3–1 win.

== Military career ==
The 1878 final was Ruck's final football match, as his army duties took him away from the game. Ruck was made captain on 28 January 1888, major on 3 November 1894, and colonel in October 1904. He served in the First Boer War in 1881 before being sent to Hong Kong and Singapore, and in 1901 he was appointed in command of the Royal Engineers in Liverpool. He retired in 1908, but was brought back to serve for the First World War.

== Personal life ==
On 16 November 1884, at Chatham, he married Eve Pedley, the daughter of Thomas Pedley (owner of 1847 Epsom Derby winner Cossack), from Stubbing Court in Derbyshire. The couple had one son, Laurence, who was killed at Neuve Chapelle in 1915, and one daughter, Mary.

In retirement, he moved to Aberdovey, where he became an authority on local archaeology. He died suddenly at his home on 24 July 1934.

== Sources ==
- Warsop, Keith (2004). The Early FA Cup Finals and the Southern Amateurs. SoccerData. ISBN 1-89946-878-1.
