= Thomas Hamond =

Thomas Hamond may refer to:

- Thomas Hammond (regicide), officer in the New Model Army
- Thomas Hamond (footballer), played for Old Etonians in the 1875 FA Cup final
