= Alfred Goodwyn =

English footballer

Alfred George Goodwyn (13 March 1850 – 14 March 1874) was an English Royal Engineer, who represented his regiment at football. He was a member of the Regiment's team that was defeated in the very first FA Cup final. He also represented England in the second international football match against Scotland in 1873.

== Career ==
Goodwyn was born at Roorhir, Bengal, in British India (now Ruhea, Bangladesh). In 1869, he entered the Royal Military Academy at Woolwich. In August 1871, he was commissioned as a lieutenant in the Royal Engineers. Fellow graduates on the same day were two of his fellow FA Cup finalists, Edmond Cotter and Herbert Muirhead, as well as Richard Ruck, who played in the 1875 FA Cup Final.

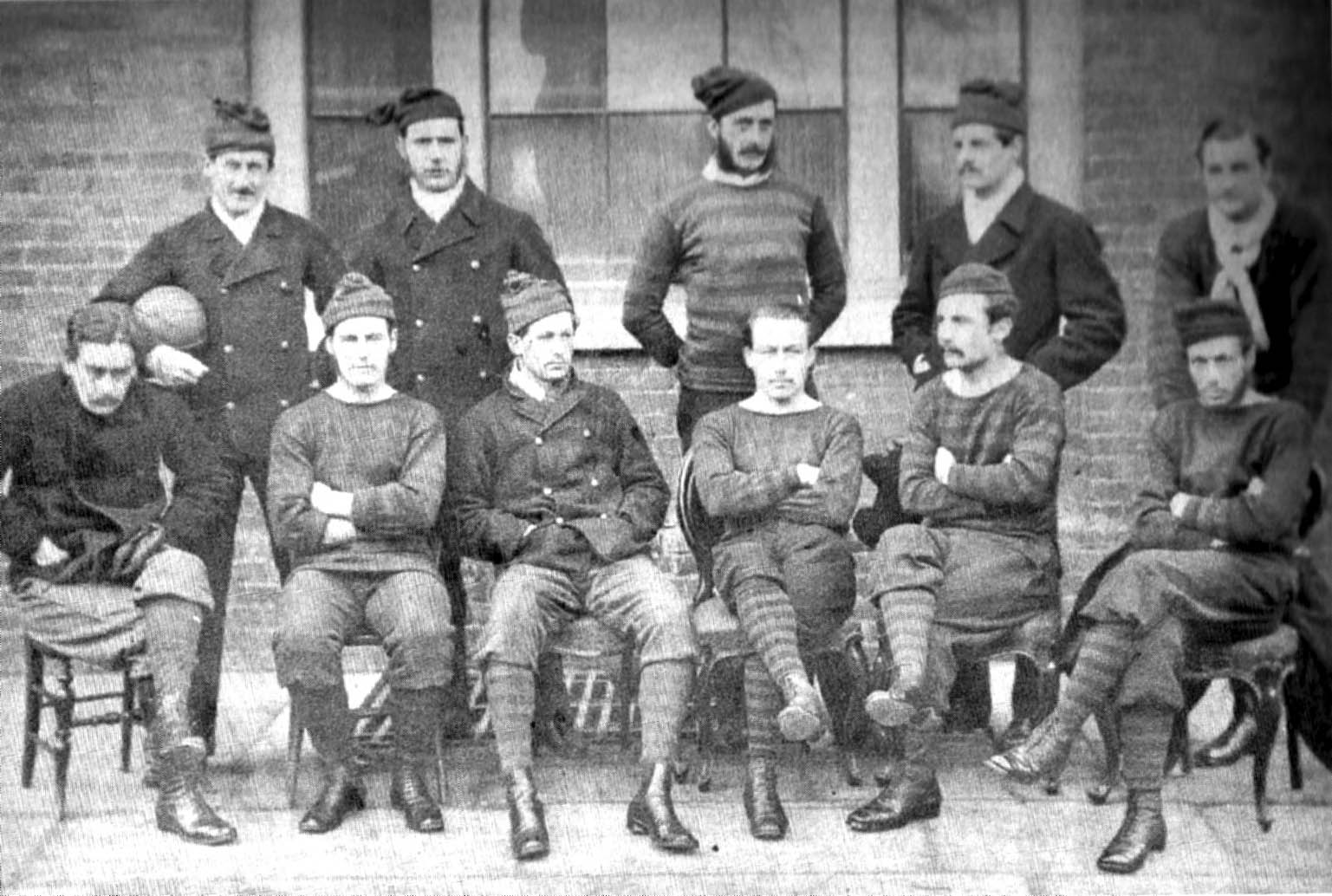
The Royal Engineers team of 1872. Eight of these players played in the first FA Cup Final. Goodwyn is seated fourth from the left

He played football for the regiment, generally playing in defence, and was a member of the team who reached the first final of the FA Cup in 1872. En route to the final, the Engineers did not concede a goal and defeated Hitchin 5–0, Hampstead Heathens 3–0 and Crystal Palace 3–0 (after a goalless draw). Although the Engineers entered the final, played at Kennington Oval on 16 March 1872, as "favourites to win the trophy", their opponents, the Wanderers, won the match 1–0.

He was selected for the second official international match between England and Scotland played at Kennington Oval, London on 8 March 1873, together with his Royal Engineers colleague, Pelham von Donop who played alongside him in defence. England won the match 4–2. In its report on the match, the Glasgow Herald (Monday, 10 March 1873) noted that "the back play of A G Goodwyn ... was faultless".

In 1874, Goodwyn was posted back to India with his regiment, where he died, at Roorkee, on 14 March 1874 (the day after his 24th birthday) as a result of injuries suffered two days earlier in a horse riding accident and ironically on the same day as the 1874 FA Cup Final where his colleagues were defeated 2–0 by Oxford University. He was the first England international footballer to die.

== Sporting honours ==
Royal Engineers

- FA Cup Final finalist: 1872

== See also ==
- List of England international footballers born outside England
