= Thomas Hamond (footballer) =

English footballer and solicitor

Personal information
- Full name: Thomas Astley Horace Hamond
- Date of birth: 17 August 1845
- Place of birth: Swaffham, Norfolk
- Date of death: 5 February 1917 (aged 71)
- Place of death: Norfolk
- Position: Right wing

Senior career*
| Years | Team | Apps | (Gls) |
| 1875–1876 | Gitanos | | |
| 1875 | Old Etonians | | |
- * Club domestic league appearances and goals

Thomas Astley Horace Hamond (17 August 1845 – 5 February 1917) was an association football player and solicitor, who won an FA Cup runner-up medal in 1875.

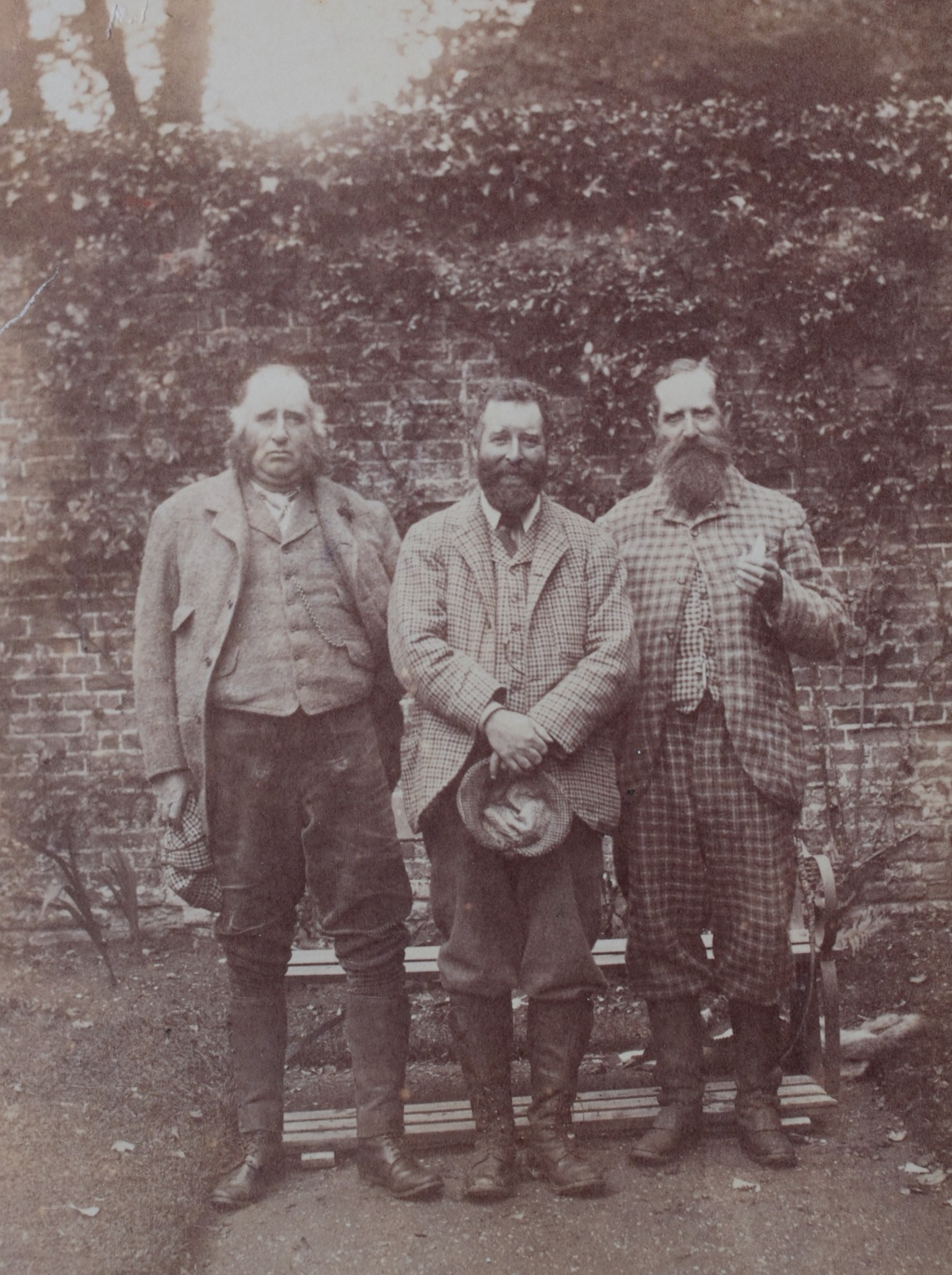
Thomas Hamond (right) with older brothers Anthony and Richard, circa 1890

== Personal life ==
Hamond was born in Swaffham in Norfolk, the son of Anthony Hamond, who was lord of the manor of West Acre in the county.

He attended Eton College and played in first-choice elevens in both codes of Etonian football - for the Field XI and the Oppidan side in the Wall Game in 1863. Team-mates in both sides included future Old Etonian players Edgar Lubbock and Quintin Hogg.

Hamond matriculated at Magdalene College, Cambridge in 1864, and was awarded his degree in 1868. He was awarded a Distinction in his Law Society finals in 1870 and became a solicitor, practising in Lincoln's Inn fields, eventually inheriting the lordship of the manor. Hamond never married and left an estate of £37,528.

== Football career ==
The first report of Hamond playing a non-Etonian code of football comes from November 1866, when he appeared for "Eton" - an Old Etonian side - against old boys from Harrow School in a goalless draw played under "University" rules.

His first recorded game of association football was for the Gitanos against the First Surrey Rifles in February 1875; his second was the 1875 FA Cup final replay. The Etonians had suffered an injury crisis after the original game against the Royal Engineers, losing four players after the first match, and Hamond was drafted in to play on the right wing alongside Lubbock. Perhaps significantly, four other players who were in the Old Etonians side had also played for the Gitanos against the Riflemen (Arthur Kinnaird, Henry Home-Drummond-Moray, A.C. Thompson, and Francis Wilson), so they had been able to assess his abilities first-hand. (One other member of the Gitanos' side was J. H. Giffard, who was the umpire nominated by the Royal Engineers.)

Hamond, who had been the oldest member of the Etonians side, played twice for the Gitanos in 1875–76; once in a defeat to the Wanderers at the Kennington Oval, and once in a 12-a-side match at Barnes which ended goalless, but there is no record of him playing afterwards. His association career therefore lasted four matches; three for Gitanos, in which his side never scored a goal, and one FA Cup final.
