= Leonard Howell (footballer) =

English footballer

Personal information
- Full name: Leonard Sedgwick Howell
- Date of birth: 6 August 1848
- Place of birth: Herne Hill, England
- Date of death: 7 September 1895 (aged 47)
- Place of death: Lausanne, Switzerland
- Position: Defender

Senior career*
Years	Team	Apps	(Gls)
- Wanderers
- Old Wykehamists

International career
1873	England	1	(0)
- * Club domestic league appearances and goals

Leonard Sedgwick Howell (6 August 1848 – 7 September 1895) was an English footballer who won the FA Cup with the Wanderers in 1873 and made one appearance as a full back for England in the second international match.

== Career ==
Leonard Howell was born in Herne Hill, a younger son of Frederick Howell, Esq. He and his elder brother Frederick Broke Howell (1846–1901), who became a clergyman, entered Winchester College together in Short Half 1861. Both were assigned to the college's house in Kingsgate Street (B), of which the Revd. Henry Moberly had become housemaster in 1859. Moberley was a strong cricketer, having played for the Oxford University eleven several times between 1842 and 1845. During his student years, Leonard Howell represented Winchester College at various sports, including "soccer", cricket and athletics, winning the 100 yds, 300 yds and 110 yds hurdles in 1866.

=== Football career ===
After leaving the college, Howell joined the Wanderers and helped them retain the FA Cup which they had won 1872 final. Under the competition rules, Wanderers were given a "bye" to the final, where they met Oxford University at Lillie Bridge on 29 March 1873. In the early stages of the final, Oxford "made the running... with Howell and Thompson performing admirably in the Wanderers defence to keep the University students at bay". Despite the students' efforts, Wanderers won the game 2–0, and thus retained the trophy. This was Howell's first match for the Wanderers; he is, thus, one of the few players to have made his debut in an FA Cup Final.

His solitary appearance for England had come three weeks before the Cup Final, in the second international match against Scotland played at Kennington Oval, London on 8 March 1873. England selected a side with a strong Wanderers influence, including Charles Chenery, Robert Vidal, Alexander Bonsor, William Kenyon-Slaney and Hubert Heron. England won the match 4–2.

His football career was brought to an end following an injury sustained during the 1873–74 season.

=== Cricket career ===
As well as playing football at a high level, Howell was also an accomplished cricketer who made nineteen first-class appearances for Surrey and Marylebone Cricket Club (MCC) between 1869 and 1880. He played as a right-hand batsman and his best season was 1870 when he scored 163 runs from eight innings. In the match against Oxford University in June/July 1870, he scored 49 in the first innings, followed by his career top score of 96 in the second innings. Despite his efforts, Oxford University won the match by three wickets.

In his cricket career, he scored a total of 519 runs from 34 innings, at an average of 18.53.

== Later life ==
After leaving Winchester College, he became a malt factor. He died at Lausanne in Switzerland on 7 September 1895, aged 47.
