= Bruce Russell (footballer) =

English footballer

Personal information
- Full name: Bruce Bremner Russell
- Date of birth: 25 August 1859
- Place of birth: Kensington, England
- Date of death: 13 May 1942 (aged 82)
- Position: Left back

Senior career*
Years	Team	Apps	(Gls)
- Royal Engineers

International career
1883	England	1	(0)
- * Club domestic league appearances and goals

Bruce Bremner Russell (25 August 1859 – 13 May 1942) was an English international footballer, who played as a left back.

== Career ==
Born in Kensington, Russell played for Royal Engineers, and earned one cap for England in 1883.
