= 1875 FA Cup final =

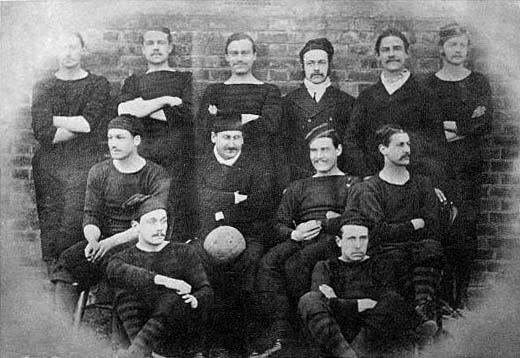
- The Royal Engineers AFC squad that won the FA Cup. Left to right (standing): Mulholland (did not play in final), Onslow, Stafford, Rawson, Mein, Wingfield; (middle): Ruck, Merriman, Tailyour, Donop; (down): Sim, Jones (did not play in final).
- Event: 1874–75 FA Cup
Royal Engineers	Old Etonians
- Royal Engineers won after a replay

Final
Royal Engineers	Old Etonians
1	1
- After extra time
- Date: 13 March 1875
- Venue: Kennington Oval, London
- Referee: Charles Alcock
- Attendance: 2,000

Replay
Royal Engineers	Old Etonians
2	0
- Date: 16 March 1875
- Venue: Kennington Oval, London
- Referee: Charles Alcock
- Attendance: 3,000

The 1875 FA Cup final was a football match between Royal Engineers and Old Etonians on 13 March 1875 at Kennington Oval in London. It was the fourth final of the world's oldest football competition, the Football Association Challenge Cup (known in the modern era as the FA Cup). Heading into the final, the Royal Engineers were playing in their third final after losing the 1872 and 1874 finals while the Old Etonians were playing in their first FA Cup final.

Prior to the final, the Royal Engineers had played the same number of matches as the Old Etonians with the Etonians getting a bye in the second round due to the odd number of the teams that had entered the tournament. 2,000 people saw the match which ended in a 1–1 draw, Alexander Bonsor scored for the Etonians but Henry Renny-Tailyour replied to have the match end in a draw and have the final being replayed for the first time with two goals from Renny-Tailyour sealing the Royal Engineers' first and only FA Cup title.

== Route to the final ==
The Engineers, who lost the final on two of the three previous occasions, kicked off with a resounding 3–0 win over Marlow. They kept the scoring feat up in the next round, beating Cambridge University 5–0. The Quarter Final was a closely fought match against Clapham Rovers, just prevailing 3–2. The Semi-final produced a repeat fixture of the final of 1874, as the Engineers faced Oxford University. This time, the Engineers won 1–0 in a replay after a 1–1 draw.

The Old Etonians started off against the Swifts, which proved a very tough match. After two drawn games, the Etonians managed to pull off a 3–0 victory. In the second round they received a bye which led them into the quarter-finals. Following a win against Maidenhead, they played Shropshire Wanderers. An extremely close match was just edged out by a single goal to nil.

== Final matches ==
The first match was notable chiefly because it was played in a "howling gale". The conditions considerably favoured the Etonians team, which had the wind at its backs for all but 10 minutes of the 90, and all 30 minutes of extra time (teams in this period changed ends after every goal- this game was the last to feature this rule). Cuthbert Ottaway received an ankle injury after 37 minutes into the final, following a collision with Richard Ruck, and was forced to leave the field; in his absence, the Old Boys were regarded as fortunate to have held on for a 1–1 draw.

Ottaway failed to recover in time for the replay, held only three days later, and Etonians also lost the services of three other players who had prior commitments. Unable to obtain adequate replacements, the Old Boys arrived at the ground an hour late and lost the delayed replay 0–2. Henry Renny-Tailyour scored all three goals in both matches for the Engineers.^{a}

The newspaper The Observer published the following chronicle of the match on 14 March 1875:

... considering the coldness of the weather, there was a large attendance of visitors, who must have numbered over 1,000... With the change of ends, the Engineers soon showed their superiority, and five minutes had scarcely elapsed before Von Donop ran the ball a short distance along the right side, planting it well in front of the Old Etonians goal, and Renny-Tailyour, who was in waiting, had little difficult in scoring the goal. The Engineers wore scarlet and blue jerseys and stockings, and blue serge knickerbockers, the Old Etonians being dressed in blue and white, which difference of uniform made the players on either side very discernible.

=== Final ===
13 March 1875

Royal Engineers	1–1 (a.e.t.)	Old Etonians
Renny-Tailyour	Report	Bonsor

Kennington Oval, London
Attendance: 2,000
Referee: Charles Alcock

Royal Engineers	Old Etonians

GK	(England) Capt William Merriman
DF	(England) Lieut George Hamilton Sim
HB	(British Raj) Lieut. Gerald Onslow
DF	(Wales) Lieut Richard Ruck
FW	(England) Lieut Pelham von Donop
FW	(England) Lieut Charles Wood
FW	(England) Lieut Herbert Rawson
FW	(England) Lieut William FH Stafford
FW	(Scotland) Capt Henry Renny-Tailyour
FW	(England) Lieut Alexander Mein
FW	(England) Lieut Cecil Wingfield-Stratford

GK	(England) Charles Farmer
DF	(England) Francis Wilson
DF	(England) Albert Thompson
DF	(England) Edgar Lubbock
FW	(England) Robert Benson
FW	(England) William Kenyon-Slaney
FW	(Ireland) Frederick Patton
FW	(England) Alexander Bonsor
FW	(England) Cuthbert Ottaway
FW	(Scotland) Hon Arthur Kinnaird
FW	(Ireland) Sir James Stronge

=== Replay ===
16 March 1875

Royal Engineers	2–0	Old Etonians
Renny-Tailyour	Report

Kennington Oval, London
Attendance: 3,000
Referee: Charles Alcock

Royal Engineers	Old Etonians

GK	(England) Capt William Merriman
DF	(England) Lieut George Hamilton Sim
HB	(British Raj) Lieut. Gerald Onslow
DF	(Wales) Lieut Richard Ruck
FW	(England) Lieut Pelham von Donop
FW	(England) Lieut Charles Wood
FW	(England) Lieut Herbert Rawson
FW	(England) Lieut William FH Stafford
FW	(Scotland) Capt Henry Renny-Tailyour
FW	(England) Lieut Cecil Wingfield-Stratford
FW	(England) Lieut Alexander Mein

GK	(Scotland) Capt Edward Drummond-Moray
DF	(England) Matt Farrer
DF	(England) Edgar Lubbock
DF	(England) Francis Wilson
FW	(England) Thomas Hamond
FW	(England) Alfred Lubbock
FW	(Ireland) Frederick Patton
FW	(England) Alexander Bonsor
FW	(England) Charles Farmer
FW	(Scotland) Hon Arthur Kinnaird
FW	(Ireland) Sir James Stronge

== Notes ==
- ^aSeveral modern sources claim that Stafford scored the second goal in the replay, but no reliable source reports support this, most of which report that the ball crossed the line in a goalmouth scramble. In an amendment to his obituary in the Royal Engineers' Journal published in February 1922, the biographer credits Renny-Tailyour with both goals in the replay.

== Bibliography ==
- Collett, Mike (2003). The Complete Record of the FA Cup. Sports Books. ISBN 1-899807-19-5.
- Gibbons, Philip (2001). Association Football in Victorian England – A History of the Game from 1863 to 1900. Upfront Publishing. ISBN 1-84426-035-6.
- Warsop, Keith (30 November 2004). The Early F.A. Cup Finals and the Southern Amateurs. Nottingham: SoccerData. ISBN 978-1899468782.
