= Charles Wood (footballer, born 1851) =

British Army officer and football player

Personal information
- Full name: Charles Knight Wood
- Date of birth: 1 July 1851
- Place of birth: Ledbury, Herefordshire, England
- Date of death: 12 February 1923 (aged 71)
- Place of death: Bodenham, Herefordshire, England
- Position: Forward

Senior career*
| Years | Team | Apps | (Gls) |
| 1872–1876 | Royal Engineers | | |
- * Club domestic league appearances and goals

Colonel Charles Knight Wood OBE (1 July 1851 – 12 February 1923) was a British Army officer in the Royal Engineers and footballer who played as a forward.

== Early life ==
Born in Ledbury, Wood was educated at Cheltenham College, and was a player in the college's cricket XI and rugby football XX in 1869. He went to the Woolwich Academy, where he proved distinguished in both military and academic matters, winning the Silver Bugle (for highest marks) in 1872 and the Despatch Box (for athletic excellence) in both 1871 and 1872. He was the younger brother of Elliott Wood and was usually known as "C.K.".

== Sporting career ==
Wood joined the Royal Engineers in 1872 and was quickly recruited for its football side, his first recorded match for the Sappers being a 3–0 win in the first round of the 1872–73 FA Cup over the Civil Service in November 1872 at the Chatham Lines. His position was on the right-side of the forward line, and by 1874 had formed a formidable partnership with Pelham von Donop, Wood usually playing in advance of von Donop.

Wood was on the losing side of the 1874 FA Cup final, the Sappers going down to Oxford University, but he collected a winner's medal in the 1875 FA Cup final, although he only played in the semi-final and final, albeit both in the original ties and in the replays.

The Cup final replay was his penultimate match in the competition. His final competitive match was also his final recorded game for the Sappers, in a surprise 3–1 defeat to the Swifts at Kennington Oval in the 1875–76 third round.

In 1879, Wood was posted to Bermuda, fortuitously with von Donop, and the two renewed their partnership on the tennis court, winning the Bermuda Open doubles.

He also played cricket for the M.C.C. in 1886, taking six wickets in the second innings against Wiltshire at Marlborough College, as well as being a regular for the Royal Engineers side in the 1870s and early 1880s.

== Military career ==
Wood served with the Royal Engineers in the Nile Expedition in 1884–85, and the Boer War between 1899 and 1901. In the latter conflict he sustained a permanent injury to his leg, and was awarded the Queen's South Africa Medal with six clasps; he retired in 1904 with the rank of colonel. He was made an Officer of the Order of the British Empire in the military division in the 1919 New Year's Honours List.

== Later life ==
Wood married Lillian Arden on 16 February 1887, in Dunsford, Devon, with whom he had 2 sons, one of whom died in 1918 while in the Colonial Service. Wood, a "fine and versatile actor", died on 12 February 1923, in Bodenham, Herefordshire, of bronchial pneumonia, just a week after he was starring in a charity play at the Kemble Theatre in Hereford.
