= Marion Stinson Crerar =

Canadian clubwoman

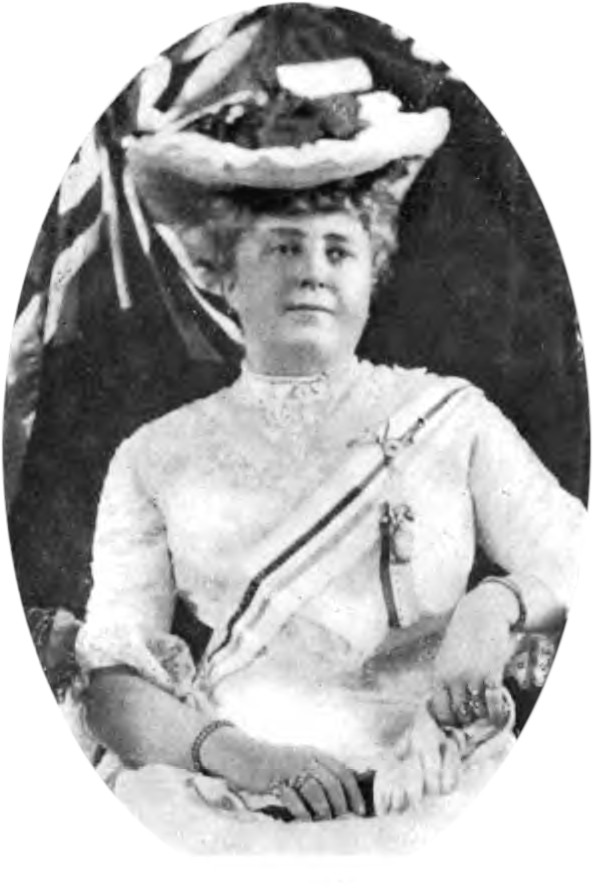
- Marion Stinson Crerar, from a 1906 publication.
- Born: Marion Elizabeth Stinson; 8 September 1859; Hamilton, Canada West
- Died: 20 May 1919 (aged 59)
- Spouses: Cuthbert John Ottaway (m. 1877; died in 1878) Peter Duncan Crerar (m. 1884; died in 1912)

Marion Elizabeth Stinson Crerar (September 8, 1859 — May 20, 1919) was a Canadian clubwoman focused on public health, and especially active during World War I.

== Early life ==
Marion Elizabeth Stinson was born in Hamilton, Canada West, the daughter of John Stinson and Emma Caroline Counsell Stinson. Her father was a banker who died from tuberculosis when Marion was six years old. Marion was educated in Canada and in England.

== Career ==
Marion Stinson Crerar helped to found the Hamilton branch of the Imperial Order Daughters of the Empire (IODE), a women's club, and served as the club's regent from 1902 to 1919. She led the club in promoting locally made goods in Hamilton, and raising funds for tuberculosis prevention. The latter work led to her joining the women's auxiliary of the Hamilton Health Association, which operated the Hamilton Mountain Sanatorium for Consumptives. She also founded a second sanatorium at London, Ontario. She was the only woman speaker at the Ontario Anti-Tuberculosis Convention in 1908.

During World War I, she worked with the IODE and the Canadian Red Cross to raise money for Canadian troops. In 1915 she opened her own home as a convalescent home for returning servicemen. Also in 1915, she persuaded the Canadian National Committee of Women for Patriotic Service to send a letter of support and loyalty to the King of England. In 1917, she advised "the new women voters" to keep their votes secret, saying "The women's votes can be of enormous power if we do not make the mistake of talking too much."

All three of her sons enlisted; one son (Alistair Crerar) was badly wounded in 1918, and one son (Malcolm Crerar) was killed in action as a member of the Royal Air Corps in 1917.

== Personal life ==
Marion Stinson married twice. Her first husband was English lawyer Cuthbert John Ottaway; they married in 1877 and she was pregnant with her daughter Lilian Ottaway and 18 years old when he died from tuberculosis months later. She married again in 1884, to Scottish-born lawyer Peter Duncan Crerar; they had four children together, including Harry Crerar, a Canadian general during World War II. Her daughter Lilian married Sir Adam Beck, a German hydropower expert in Ontario.

Marion Stinson Crerar was widowed a second time in 1912. She died in 1919, aged 59 years, from diabetes.
