= Elliott Wood =

British Army general

Major-General Sir Elliott Wood KCB
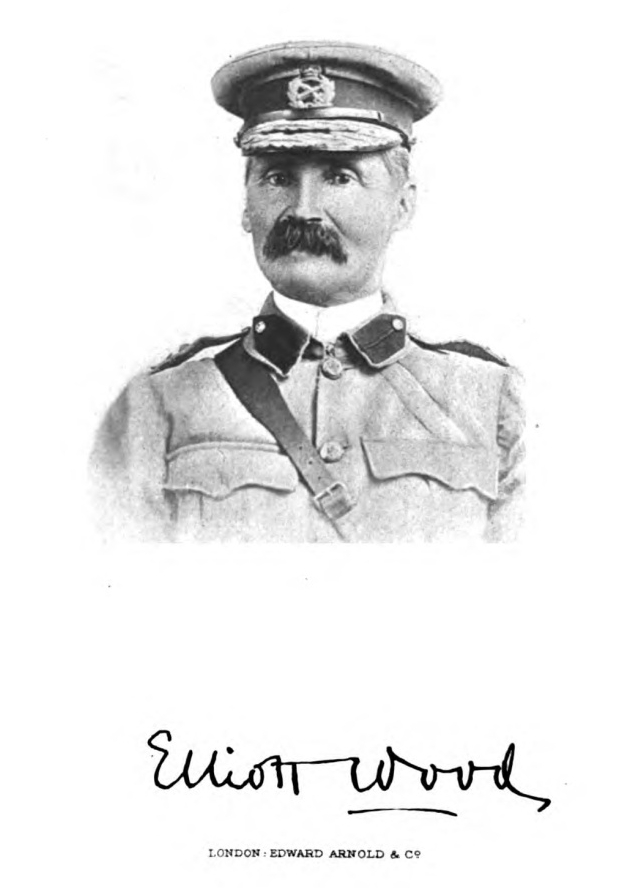
- Wood in c. 1924
- Born: 5 May 1844; Ledbury, Herefordshire, England
- Died: 7 September 1931 (aged 87); Hereford, Herefordshire, England
- Relatives: Colonel Charles Knight Wood (brother)
- Military career
- Allegiance: United Kingdom
- Branch: British Army
- Service years: 1864–1906
- Rank: Major-General
- Unit: Royal Engineers
- Conflicts: Anglo-Egyptian War; Mahdist War; Second Boer War
- Awards: Knight Commander of the Bath

Major-General Sir Elliott Wood, KCB (5 May 1844 – 7 September 1931) was a British Army officer, who served in the Anglo-Egyptian War, the Sudan Campaign and the Second Boer War.

== Military career ==
Wood was born in 1844, the son of Dr. Miles Astman Wood, of Ledbury. He was commissioned a lieutenant in the Royal Engineers on 15 January 1864, and was promoted to captain on 30 September 1877. He served in the Anglo-Egyptian War in 1882, and was present at the Battle of Tell El Kebir (September 1882), for which he was mentioned in despatches, received the medal with clasps, the 4th class of the Order of Medjidie, the Khedive's star, and a brevet promotion to major on 18 November 1882. Two years later, he took part in the Sudan expedition of 1884 (twice mentioned in despatches), for which he received a brevet promotion to lieutenant-colonel on 21 May 1884. He continued in the Sudan Campaign of 1885, for which he was also mentioned in despatches, and appointed a Companion of the Order of the Bath (CB).

Following promotion to colonel on 21 May 1888, Wood was from 1889 to 1894 A.G.G. at Headquarters, and from 1894 to 1899 he was in command of the Royal Engineers at Malta. On 1 April 1899 he was appointed Commanding Royal Engineer at Aldershot Garrison. After the Second Boer War broke out in October 1899, he was asked to accompany Sir Redvers Buller and the 1st Army Corps as they went to South Africa. On arrival he was appointed Chief Engineer in South Africa, with local rank of major-general, and continued as such until the war ended in June 1902. For his war service he was thrice mentioned in despatches, received the Queen's South Africa Medal with five clasps and the King's South Africa Medal with two clasps, and was promoted to a Knight Commander of the Order of the Bath (KCB) in the 1901 South Africa Honours list (the order was dated to 29 November 1900). He returned to the United Kingdom on the SS Dunvegan Castle, which arrived in Southampton in early September 1902, and was invested with the KCB by King Edward VII at Buckingham Palace on 24 October 1902.

Wood was appointed in command of the Royal Engineers, 1st Army Corps based at Aldershot Garrison, on 8 September 1902, and received the substantive rank of major-general on the same day (this was later dated back to 22 August 1902 as he was promoted for Distinguished service in the Field in the October 1902 South Africa Honours list). He retired from the army in 1906.

In 1924 he published Life and Adventure in Peace and War.

== Family ==
Wood married, in 1906, Annie Beatrice Bourne, daughter of Colonel Robert Bourne and widow of Horace R. Dugmore. They lived at Holmer Park, Hereford, and he died on 7 September 1931.
