= John Blackburn (footballer) =

Scottish footballer and soldier

Colonel John Edward Blackburn CB (30 April 1851 – 29 September 1927) was a Scottish footballer and soldier.

In 1869, he entered the Royal Military Academy, Woolwich and was commissioned in the Royal Engineers in 1871. He played for the Royal Engineers A.F.C. and Scotland.

He was made a Companion of the Order of the Bath in the 1917 New Year Honours for services during the First World War.
