= Lughman =

Lughman لغمان Loghmān
- Location in Khwahan Afghanistan
- Coordinates: 37°44′30″N 70°22′59″E
- Country: Afghanistan
- Province: Badakhshan
- District: Khwahan
- Time zone: + 4.50

Lughman Persian: لغمان is a village in Khwahan Badakhshan Province in north-eastern Afghanistan.
