= Richard Ruck =

British Army officer

Major-General Sir Richard Ruck KBE CB CMG
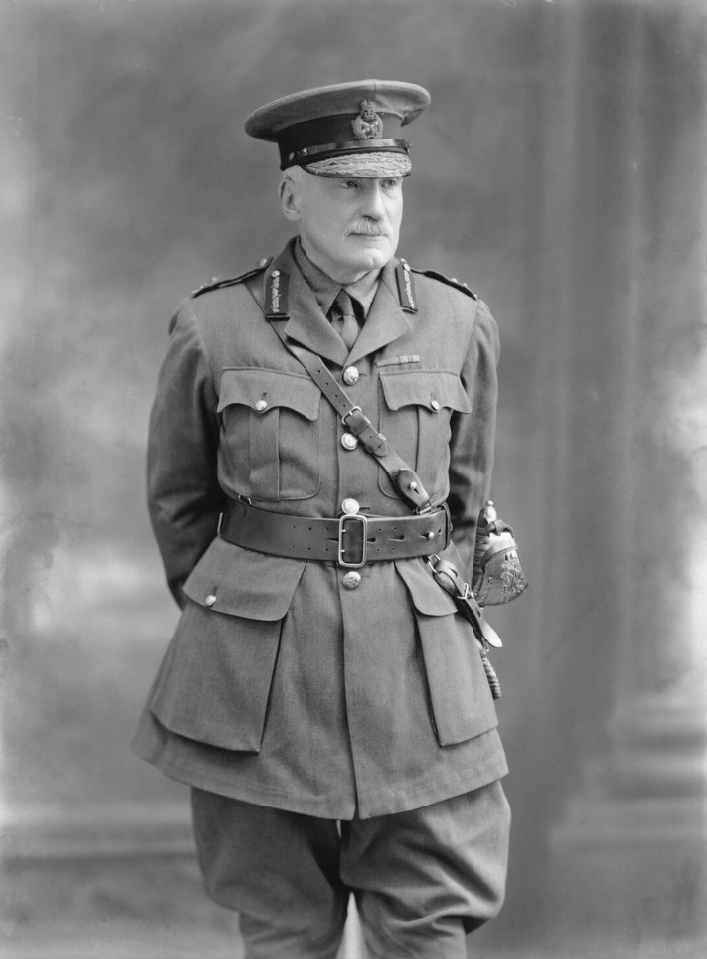
- Richard Ruck in 1920
- Born: 27 May 1851; Pennal, Merionethshire, Wales
- Died: 17 March 1935 (aged 83); St John's Wood, London, England
- Burial place: Golders Green Crematorium, London
- Relatives: Oliver Edwal Ruck (brother); James Atkin, Baron Atkin (nephew); Berta Ruck (niece); Bernard Darwin (nephew)
- Military career
- Allegiance: United Kingdom
- Branch: British Army
- Service years: 1871–1916
- Rank: Major-General
- Unit: Royal Engineers
- Commands: Inspector of Submarine Defences; Director of Fortifications and Works
- Awards: K.B.E., C.B., C.M.G.

Major-General Sir Richard Mathews Ruck, KBE, CB, CMG (27 May 1851 – 17 March 1935) was a British Army officer who served with the Royal Engineers, spending most of his career in the Submarine Mining Service, before becoming the Director of Fortifications and Works (the equivalent of the Chief Royal Engineer). He was a keen amateur sportsman, who played football for the Royal Engineers, helping them to victory in the 1875 FA Cup Final.

== Family and education ==
Richard Ruck was born at Pennal, Merionethshire, Wales on 27 May 1851, the fourth child and second son of Laurence Ruck (c.1820–1896), a gentleman farmer, originally from Newington in Kent. Richard acquired his second Christian name from his mother, Mary Anne Mathews (1822–1905), whose family could claim descent from Owain Glyndŵr, the last Welsh native Prince of Wales.^{a}

Richard's siblings included:

- Mary Elizabeth Ruck (1842–1920): married Robert Travers Atkin, a newspaper editor; their son, James, became an eminent judge and was ennobled as James Atkin, Baron Atkin.
- Arthur Ashley Ruck (1847–1939): served with The King's (Liverpool Regiment), retiring in 1886 with the honorary rank of lieutenant-colonel. He was later the Chief Constable of Caernarvonshire. His daughter Amy Roberta (1878–1978) was a writer of romance novels.
- Amy Richenda Ruck (1850–1876): married Francis Darwin, the botanist son of the naturalist Charles Darwin. She died shortly after the birth of her son, Bernard, the golf writer.
- Oliver Edwal Ruck (1856–1934): also served with the Royal Engineers and played in the 1878 FA Cup Final.

Ruck was educated privately, before joining the Royal Military Academy, Woolwich.

== Football and sporting career ==
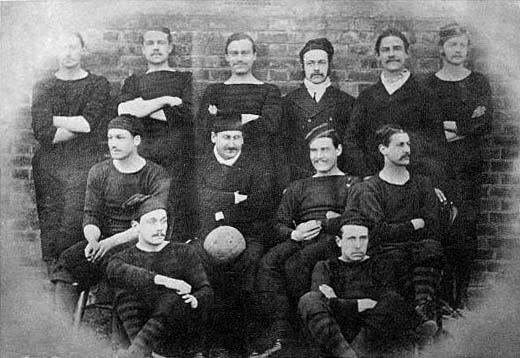
The Royal Engineers team of 1875. Ruck is on the left of the middle (seated) row.

At the Royal Military Academy, Ruck gained a reputation as an athlete, playing both cricket and rugby football and being a keen gymnast. On joining the Royal Engineers in 1871, he switched to association football. At this time, the Royal Engineers were among the top football teams in England, having reached the final of the first FA Cup tournament in 1872 and again two years later, finishing on both occasions as runners-up. Ruck played on the right of the half-backs and was described as a "good half-back, being a sure kick... using his weight well".

The Engineers reached the FA Cup Final for the third time in four years in 1875 but only after a hard semi-final against Oxford University, with a 1–1 draw followed by a 1–0 victory in the replay. In the final, played on 13 March 1875 at Kennington Oval, the Engineers met the Old Etonians. The match was played in a strong gale and the Engineers spent most of the match against the gale, with the rules requiring ends to be changed after each goal. Alexander Bonsor scored for the Old Boys after 30 minutes followed by an equaliser from Capt Renny-Tailyour within five minutes. Shortly after the equaliser, Ruck collided with Cuthbert Ottaway who was forced to leave the field with a serious ankle injury; in his absence, the Old Boys were regarded as fortunate to have held on for a 1–1 draw.

The replay was three days later; although the Engineers were able to field the same eleven as in the first match, the Etonians had to make four changes, losing the match 2–0, with both the Engineers' goals scored by Capt Renny-Tailyour. At the third attempt, the Royal Engineers won their first, and only, FA Cup Final.

Ruck also represented the Royal Engineers at billiards, cricket and golf. During his military posting to Malta from 1899 to 1902, he laid out a golf course and designed the clubhouse, before winning the inaugural tournament, despite this being open to officers from both the Army and the Royal Navy.

In 1891, he was the founder and first secretary of the Welsh Golfing Union, becoming president in 1933, and was a member of golf clubs at Aberdovey and Woking.

In December 1928, he was the author of a "valuable" article published in the Royal Engineers Journal entitled "R.E. Football in the Early 'Seventies".^{b} In the article, Ruck describes the Engineers' use of passing rather than running with the ball:

Individually, we were sometimes up against better players than ourselves, but collectively we felt equal to any club. We were a veritable band of brothers.

== Military career ==
Ruck graduated from RMA Woolwich and joined the Royal Engineers as a lieutenant on 2 August 1871. After completing his initial training at the Royal School of Military Engineering in Chatham in November 1873, he was posted to Aldershot until September 1874, when he returned to Chatham to join the Submarine Mining Service, in which he was to serve for over 20 years.

Over the next six years, Ruck was posted to various ports around the British Isles, including Pembroke and Cork, taking command of the 28th Company, Royal Engineers, until 1 March 1881, when he was appointed assistant instructor at the School of Military Engineering, in charge of the Submarine Mining School at Gillingham. He was promoted to captain on 2 August 1883.

Between May and December 1885, Ruck worked in the War Office, before being appointed Assistant Inspector of Submarine Mining Defences in January 1886, with the temporary rank of major in the Army. He was promoted to the permanent rank of major on 17 December 1889, and to Inspector of Submarine Defences at Headquarters on 1 July 1891, replacing Colonel R. Y. Armstrong.

On 31 December 1896, Ruck was promoted to lieutenant-colonel, and left the War Office to become Commander, Royal Engineers (C.R.E.) at Shoeburyness, until July 1898, when he was placed on temporary half-pay on account of ill-health. On 1 January 1899, his health was restored and he briefly returned to the War Office, until 26 April 1899, when he took up his first and only overseas posting as C.R.E., West Sub-district, Malta.

Having been promoted to brevet colonel on 17 June 1901, Ruck remained in Malta until 1 June 1902, when he returned to England to take up the post of Deputy Inspector-General of Fortifications, at Headquarters, under General Sir Richard Harrison.

On 1 April 1904, he was promoted to Director of Fortifications and Works (the equivalent of the Chief Royal Engineer), with the substantive rank of Colonel in the Army, obtaining the temporary rank of brigadier general on 17 July 1905.

After four years as director of fortifications and works, on 1 April 1908 Ruck was appointed major general in charge of administration, taking over from Major General Edward Thompson Dickson, and was soon afterwards promoted to major general, before retiring from the army at his own request on 1 October 1912, having been appointed a Companion of the Most Honourable Order of the Bath (C.B.) in the Coronation Honours of 23 June 1911. In his final role, he took charge of the military arrangements in London during the railway strike in August 1911.

=== First World War service ===
On the outbreak of the First World war, Ruck volunteered to re-join the Army, and on 22 October 1914 he was appointed Chief Engineer of the Central Force, with responsibility for organising Territorial units in London and eastern England, covering the coast from The Wash to Portsmouth, and for preparing the defences of London. In April 1915, the command of the Central Force was combined with that of the Eastern Command, and in November 1915, Ruck was appointed Major-General in Charge of Administration to the Eastern Command.

On 6 June 1916, he was replaced by Major General Sir Frederick Robb, and retired for the second time. following which he was mentioned in dispatches. On 1 January 1917, he was appointed a companion of The Most Distinguished Order of Saint Michael and Saint George (C.M.G.).

== Aeronautics ==
Ruck developed a keen interest in aeronautics and in 1905, he forecast that "in the early future the question of military supremacy would be decided by fighting in the air".

In 1911, Ruck became a member of the Royal Aeronautical Society, and was the society's chairman from 1912 to 1919, after which he became a vice-president.

In 1916, he was appointed vice-chairman of the Air Inventions Committee under the Air Ministry, and was also a member of the first Civil Aerial Transport Committee.

For his services on the Air Inventions Committee, Ruck was appointed Knight Commander of the Order of the British Empire (K.B.E.) on 1 April 1920.

== Inventor ==
Throughout his career, Ruck submitted numerous applications for patents to cover his inventions, including:

- June 1885: A "counterbalancing float for marine torpedoes".
- May 1890: Hook or shackle.
- October 1906: Variable speed driving mechanism.
- August 1927: Gear-changing apparatus.
- March 1930: Gear-changing apparatus.

== Marriage and children ==
On 8 October 1878, Ruck (aged 27) married 45-year old Mary Constance Pedley née Gully, the widow of Thomas H. Pedley (1806–1871), at the Roman Catholic Church of Our Lady of the Rosary, Marylebone. She was the daughter of the late John Gully (1783–1863), a prize-fighter and politician. By her marriage to Thomas Pedley, Mary had ten children, including William (1858–1920), who played first-class cricket for Sussex and was later an engineer in California, and Eve (1854–1951) who married Richard's younger brother, Oliver, in 1884.

By 1903, Richard Ruck was in a relationship with a 21-year old Frenchwoman, Elizabeth Marie (Lisette) Ducros, with whom he had three children: Alice Bertha (1903–1991), Richard Edward (1905–1976) and Dorise Annette (1908–1997). In January 1905, Lisette Ducros was the subject of an attempted blackmail by Frederick Paxton, who threatened to expose her relationship with "a Mr.... in the War Office", with whom she had a child, and accused her of "keeping a disorderly house" at her lodgings in Clarendon Street, Pimlico. At his trial at the Central Criminal Court on 8 February, Paxton was found guilty of demanding money with menaces, and sentenced to 18 months hard labour.

Ruck's wife, Mary, died on 13 October 1914, but earlier that year, Lisette had married student-teacher Frank Hoare (1894–1980), who would later become a film and TV producer. Richard Ruck adopted the three children shortly after the death of his wife. Alice married Revd. Geoffrey Warwick in a "society wedding" at St. Paul's Church, Regent's Park, London on 23 February 1927. Dorise married Edward Kench at All Saints' Church, Leamington Spa on 11 June 1930.

== Death and funeral ==
Following the death of his friend, John Townshend, 6th Marquess Townshend in 1921, Ruck was a trustee of the Raynham estates in Norfolk, during the minority of the 7th Marquess, who inherited the title aged just 5.

During the last few years of his life, Ruck lived with his daughter, Alice and her husband, Revd. Geoffrey Warwick at Woodford, Essex (where Geoffrey Warwick was Vicar of St Peter-in-the-Forest), although his home was at Charles Street in St James's, Westminster. Richard Ruck died, aged 83, on 17 March 1935 at a nursing home in St John's Wood, London.

His funeral was at Golders Green Crematorium on 21 March 1935.

Among the tributes paid to him, one officer said:

He had a very strong character and a quiet efficiency which was very comforting to his subordinates.

== Notes ==
- ^a Most official sources record him as Richard Matthews Ruck; e.g. his military service records.
- ^b The reprint of the Royal Engineers Journal on the NZ Sappers website has had the pages covering Ruck's article removed.

== Bibliography ==
- Collett, Mike (2003). The Complete Record of the FA Cup. Sports Books. ISBN 1-899807-19-5.
- Gibbons, Philip (2001). Association Football in Victorian England – A History of the Game from 1863 to 1900. Upfront Publishing. ISBN 1-84426-035-6.
- Warsop, Keith (30 November 2004). The Early F.A. Cup Finals and the Southern Amateurs. Nottingham: SoccerData. ISBN 978-1899468782.
