= Gitanos F.C. =

Gitanos
- Full name: Gitanos Football Club
- Founded: 1864
- Dissolved: 1881
- Ground: Prince's Cricket Ground
- Secretary/Captain: Charles E. Farmer
Home colours

Gitanos Football Club was an English association football club and one of the first members of the Football Association.

== History ==
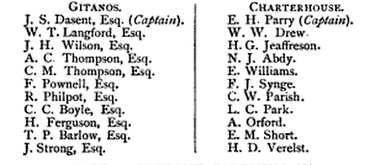
Lineups for November 8, 1873 match against Charterhouse School.

The club was founded in 1864, their name, Spanish for "gypsies", and primarily consisted of Old Etonians and Old Carthusians (men who had attended Eton or Charterhouse).

The earliest known report of the club playing an external fixture dates from 1867. As a "select" club, in an era before players concentrated their efforts on one club, the Gitanos enjoyed the ad hoc services of a number of prominent players of the day, such as Arthur Kinnaird, Edgar Lubbock, Albert Thompson, George Holden of the Clapham Rovers, and J.H. Giffard of the Civil Service. There was a particular overlap with the Wanderers as old boys of Eton and Charterhouse were eligible for both sides.

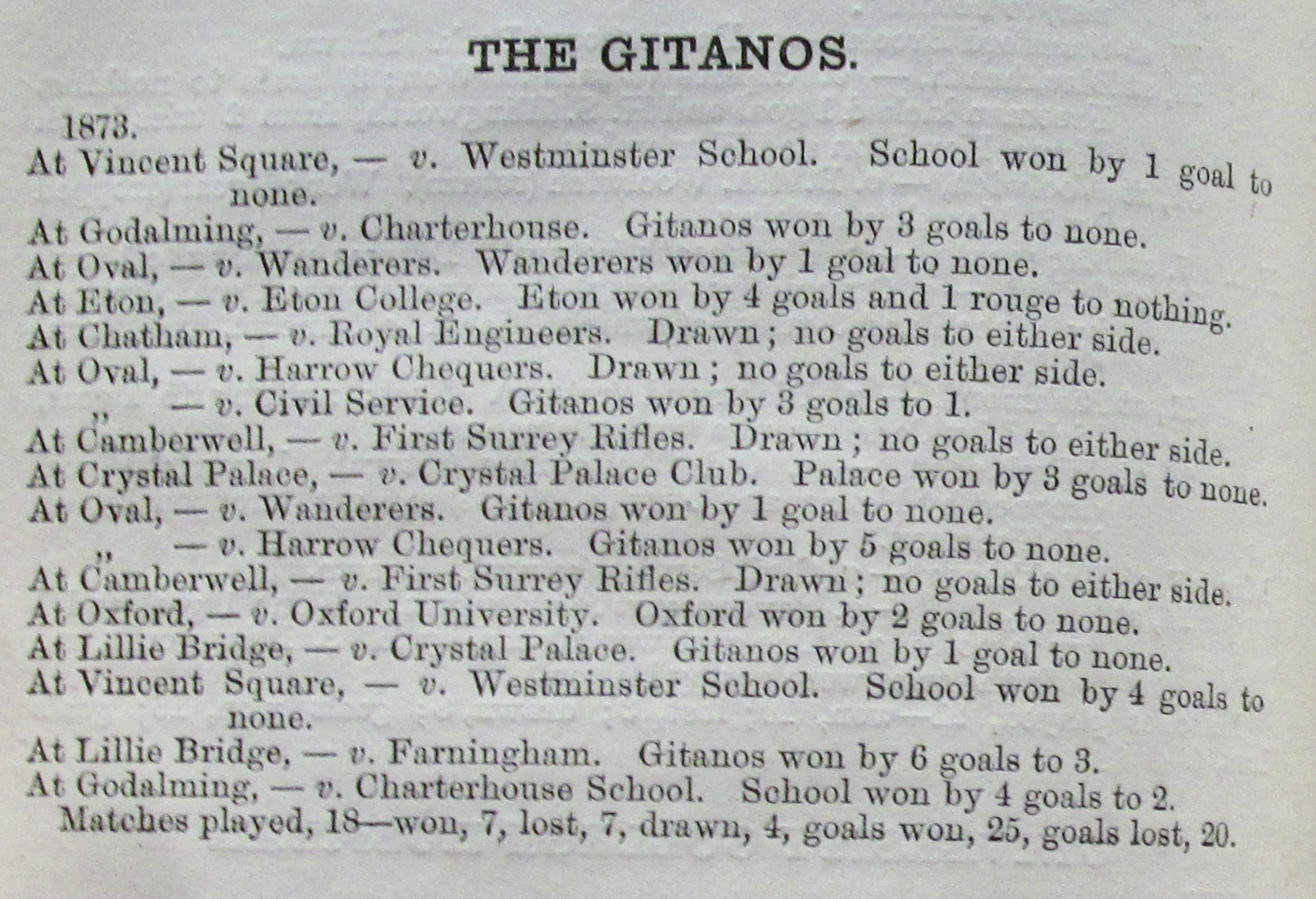
Results for the Gitanos Football Club in 1873, as reported in the 1874 Charles Alcock Football Annual

The club competed in the FA Cup in 1873, losing to Uxbridge F.C. in the first round. Given the overlap of membership with the Wanderers, most players preferred to play for the more successful club in Cup competition, and the Gitanos' one FA Cup tie saw only eight players turn up. Those who did play were not the first choice players; of the line-up that faced the Royal Engineers that season, only four played against Uxbridge, and two other players played instead for the Wanderers in the competition. The club did not enter the FA Cup again.

The club gradually petered out over the 1870s, with competition for loyalty from the Old Etonians and Old Carthusians sides which gained more prominence over the decade, although it was helped by absorbing players from the disbanding Runnymede club in October 1878. The club could still occasionally put out a strong side; Gitanos for instance gained a surprising 7–1 win over the Old Etonians - at the time the FA Cup holders - to open the 1879–80 season at Eton College. It was still registered as a member of the Football Association in 1882 but it does not seem to have played after meeting Westminster School in January 1881.

== Records ==
Only FA Cup performance: 1st Round – 1873–74

== Colours ==
The club wore scarlet, violet, and white, in broad "stripes", which in the context of the time referred to hoops.

== Ground ==
As the club's name - being Spanish for "gypsy" - suggested, the club played most of its matches away from home; it originally declared it had no ground and 16 of its 18 matches in 1873 for instance were at the opponent's venue. It did however host two games at Lillie Bridge that year. In 1874 the club gained a tenancy at the Prince's Cricket Ground.

== Legacy ==
In 1891, an article in Fores's Sporting Notes reviewed a copy of the 1874 Football Annual and commented on how clubs had come and gone over time. The 1874 annual listed less than 200 football clubs in all of England, and by 1891 the author asked "what has become of such old giants as the Gitanos, Harrow Chequers, Pilgrims, and Woodford Wells."

== See also ==
- Crusaders, another club of the time made up of old boys from two public schools (Eton and Westminster School)
- Category:Gitanos F.C. players
