= Cuthbert Ottaway =

English sportsman (1850–1878)

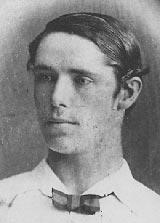
Cuthbert Ottaway, first captain of the England international football team, was regarded by contemporaries as perhaps the most versatile sportsman of his generation.

Cuthbert John Ottaway (19 July 1850 – 2 April 1878) was an English footballer. He was the first captain of the England football team and led his side in the first official international football match.

Representing his university at five different sports – a record that remains unmatched – Ottaway was also a noted cricketer until his retirement shortly before his early death at the age of 27.

== Early life, professional career and death ==
Cuthbert Ottaway was born in Dover, the only child of James Ottaway, a surgeon and former mayor of the town. He was educated at Eton (where he was a King's Scholar) and at Brasenose College, Oxford, where he displayed a versatility as a sportsman matched only by his near-contemporary Alfred Lyttelton. Representing his school in the annual cricket match against Harrow, twice victor in the Public Schools' Rackets Doubles Championship, and winning Blues for representing his university at football (1874), cricket (1870–73), racquets (1870–73), athletics (1873) and real tennis (1870–72), Ottaway was – an Oxford newspaper remembered after his death – "a great cricketer... the best amateur racquet player of his time, a capital football player and a fair sprint runner. It has fallen to the lot of few amateur cricketers to attain greater popularity, and his reception on the day when he took his degree at Oxford was something to be remembered."

Ottaway read classics at Brasenose, and, after going down, trained as a barrister and was called to the bar in 1873. He married, in August 1877, Marion Stinson of Hamilton, Ontario – whom he met, when she was just 13, while touring Canada with an England cricket team – and practised law until his death, in London, as a result of complications from a chill caught in the course of a night's dancing. The precise cause of death remains a matter of speculation. Diabetes ran in the Ottaway family, and this may have increased his susceptibility to respiratory diseases. It is also possible that he had earlier contracted tuberculosis.

Ottaway had one daughter, Lilian, who was born after his death. She married the Canadian politician Sir Adam Beck, and became Lady Beck. Ottaway is buried in Paddington Old Cemetery.

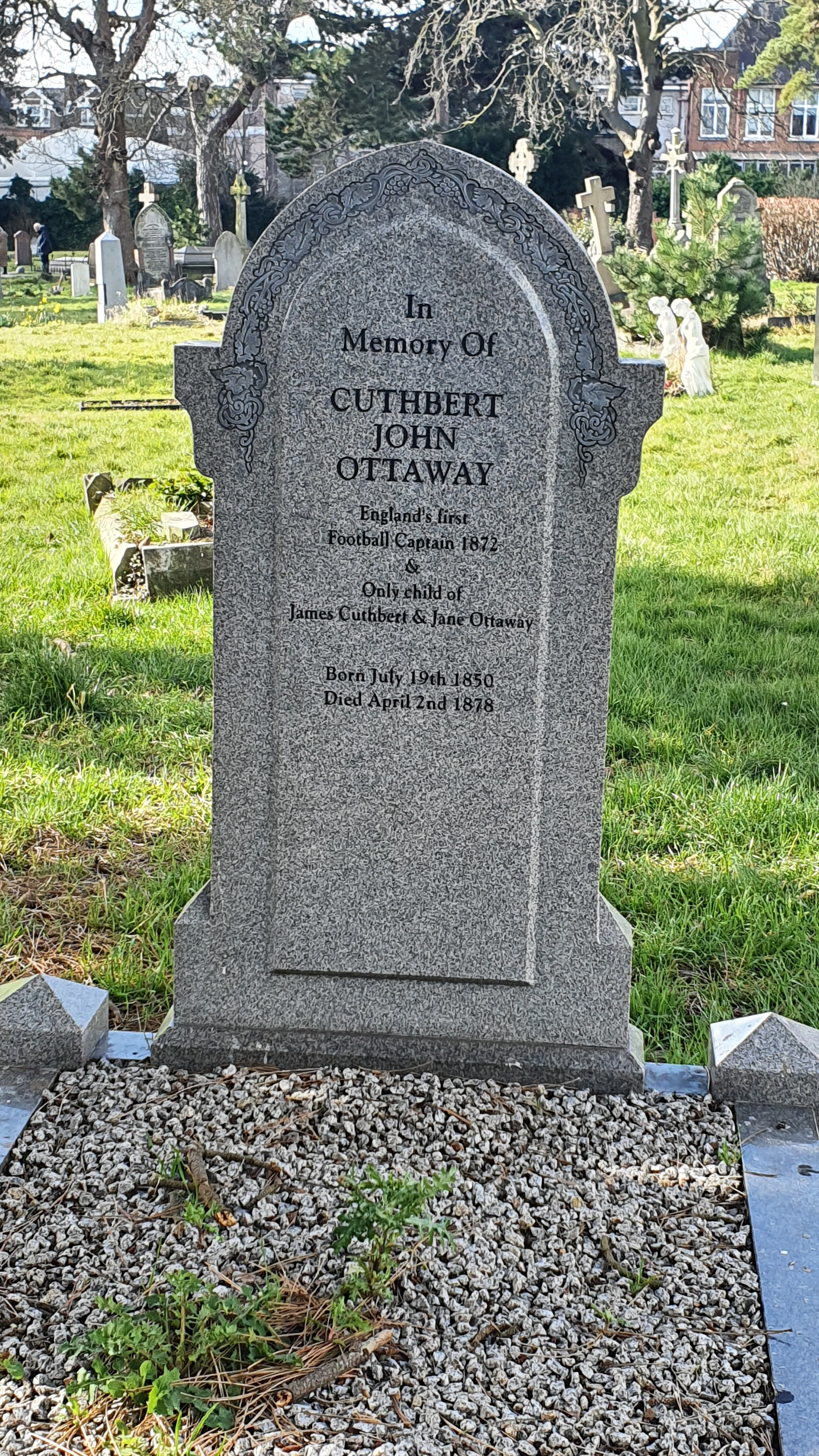
Tomb stone of Cuthbert John Ottaway in Paddington Old Cemetery

== Club career ==
Ottaway's greatest successes came as a footballer. He attended school and university at a time when the new Association code was gaining considerable popularity, and – as was often the case in the earliest days of the amateur game – represented several teams, playing for Old Etonians, Oxford University, Crystal Palace and Marlow.

As a club player, Ottaway took part in three successive FA Cup finals between 1873 and 1875, losing 1–2 with Oxford University against Wanderers in 1873, winning 2–0 with Oxford against Royal Engineers a year later, and then representing Old Etonians against Royal Engineers in 1875. He was noted for his speed and dribbling ability – this at a time when "the dribbling game", in which one man retained control of the ball for as long as possible until tackled, had yet to be superseded by the "combination" (passing) game.

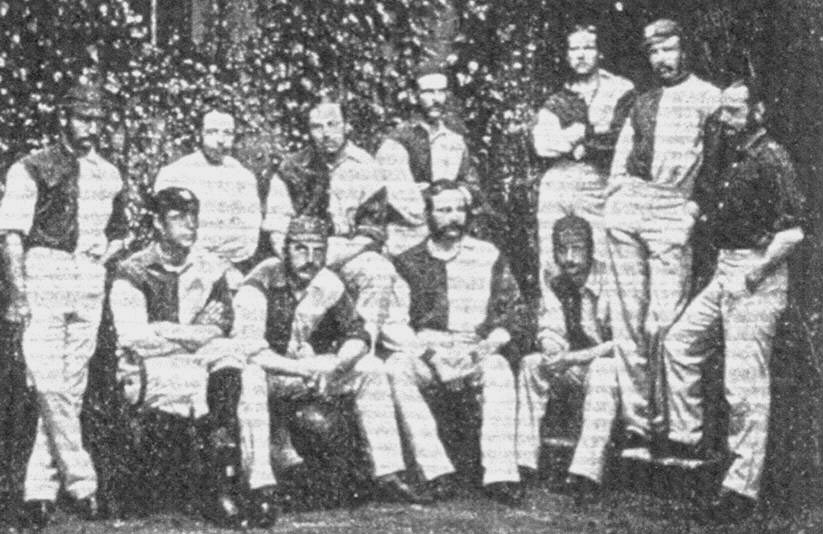
Oxford University's F.A. Cup winning side of 1874 (Ottaway sitting at front, first on the left).

Ottaway played an important part in two of his three finals. In 1874 he captained Oxford and helped to pin the Engineers back in their own half for long periods with extended excursions into opposition territory. He also participated in a three-man dribble that took the ball almost the whole length of the pitch and resulted in the scoring of his team's second and decisive goal. In 1875, Ottaway represented Old Etonians in a match notable chiefly because it was played in a "howling gale". The conditions considerably favoured the Eton team, which had the wind at its backs for all but 10 minutes of the 90, and all 30 minutes of extra time (teams in this period changed ends after every goal). Ottaway himself received a severe hack on his ankle from Richard Ruck 37 minutes into the final and was forced to leave the field; in his absence, the Old Boys were regarded as fortunate to have held on for a 1–1 draw. Ottaway failed to recover in time for the replay, held only three days later, and Etonians also lost the services of three other players who had prior commitments. Unable to obtain adequate replacements, the Old Boys arrived at the ground an hour late and lost the delayed replay 0–2.

Although the precise nature of Ottaway's ankle injury remains unknown, there is no evidence that he ever played senior football again after the 1875 Cup Final. His biographer, Michael Southwick, suggests that "the damage sustained to his ankle... signalled the end of his footballing career."

== International career ==
As an international, Ottaway was selected to lead the England team travelling to Partick to meet Scotland on 30 November 1872 in what is now recognised as the first international match to be played. (England had met a "Scotland" team in five earlier friendlies, but these matches are not regarded as official as the "Scotch" players were drawn solely from those then domiciled in England). England dominated the match, played before a crowd of around 4,000 at the West of Scotland Cricket Club, but were unable to break down an obdurate Scottish defence, a failing probably attributable to the "rampant individualism" indulged by Ottaway's forwards in this early and formative period of the Association game. The game ended in a 0–0 draw.

Ottaway did not play in the return fixture, arranged in London for 8 March 1873, but again captained his country in the third England-Scotland international, played once again at Partick on 7 March 1874. On this occasion, the result was a 2–1 victory for Scotland.

The precise reasons for Ottaway's elevation to the captaincy in 1872 are not known. Southwick suggests that he owed his selection solely to Charles Alcock, who had originally been chosen to captain the team by the committee of the Football Association. Alcock was injured playing for Old Harrovians sometime before the international, and, writes Southwick, "it being too late to call a committee meeting... it fell, almost certainly, to Alcock, and Alcock alone, [to decide] who would fill the breach." The Field, on the other hand, suggested that the decision was made by general acclaim, writing: "Mr C.J. Ottaway [was] unanimously selected by the Englishmen as best worthy to take the command."

== Playing style and reputation ==
Cuthbert Ottaway played principally as a centre forward in the seven- and eight-man attacks in vogue during the early 1870s, and was described as "an excellent forward, being fast and very skilful in piloting the ball". As a striker, another contemporary appreciation noted, "he can certainly hold his own against all rivals"; he was "an elegant dribbler and plays well." It would appear that the player depended more heavily on skill and control than most footballers of his period; at a time when play of the most robust sort – including body-checking and "hacking" – was in vogue, Ottaway was praised for his grace. "His beautiful science," another report observed, "exhibited how a ball ought to be taken through a host of foes."

Ottaway appears to have been well regarded by his teammates, but there are hints that he practised the snobbery not uncommon among men of his class and time. The Sheffield amateur Charles Clegg (later Sir Charles Clegg, President of the Football Association), who played alongside him in the first England-Scotland international, remarked in later years that none of the southern amateurs in the side would speak to him.

== Cricketing career ==
As a cricketer, Cuthbert Ottaway represented Eton College, Oxford University, Gentlemen, South of England, Middlesex, Kent and M.C.C., also touring the United States and Canada with an England team in 1872. He played as a right-handed batsman and first came to public notice in 1868, when his 108, scored in the Eton-Harrow match at Lord's, was largely responsible for his team's victory in the fixture by an innings and 108 runs. Ottaway went on to score two first-class centuries, both notched at the end of his career, while accumulating a total of 1,691 runs at an average of 27.27. "As a steady, defensive player," according to one obituarist, "he had not many superiors," and Southwick writes that he was "considered to have both the best defensive and most correcting batting action. of his day." In his best year, 1876, Ottaway stood fourth in the national first-class batting averages.

Though Ottaway represented Gentlemen against Players three times (in 1870, 1872 and 1876) – the highest honour available to a cricketer in the years before the advent of Tests – he is perhaps better known for playing in four Varsity Matches against Cambridge. The most notable of these was the first, in 1870 – a game still remembered as "Cobden's Match". Scoring 69 in Oxford's second innings and taking an exceptional catch one-handed at long on, Ottaway played a full part in helping his teammates to a position in which, with three wickets remaining, they needed to score four runs to win the game. Bets were taken among the spectators at 100–1 on for Oxford to win from this position, but they were thwarted by the Cambridge bowler Frank Cobden, who – having conceded one run from the first ball of his four-ball over – took a hat-trick with his last three balls to leave Ottaway's team two runs short of a tie and three short of the total required for victory. "By superior bowling and infinitely superior fielding," commented Geoffrey Bolton's History of the OUCC, "Oxford reached a position where they could not lose; and they lost."

== Honours ==
Oxford University

- FA Cup: 1874

== Sources ==
- Bolton, Geoffrey (1962). History of the OUCC. Oxford: Holywell Press.
- Gibbons, Philip (2001). Association Football in Victorian England: A History of the Game from 1863 to 1900. Leicestershire: Upfront Publishing. ISBN 1-84426-035-6.
- Gibson, Alfred, and William Pickford (1906). Association Football and the Men Who Made It. London, 4 vols.: The Caxton Publishing Company.
- Southwick, Michael (2009). England's First Football Captain: A Biography of Cuthbert Ottaway, 1850–1878. Nottingham: Soccer Data. ISBN 978-1-905891-27-6.
- Wall, Sir Frederick (2006 reprint of 1935 original). 50 Years of Football 1884–1934. Cleethorpes: Soccer Books.
- Warsop, Keith (2004). The Early FA Cup Finals and the Southern Amateurs. Nottingham: Soccer Data. ISBN 1-899468-78-1
