= Henry Renny-Tailyour =

Scottish sportsperson (1849–1920)

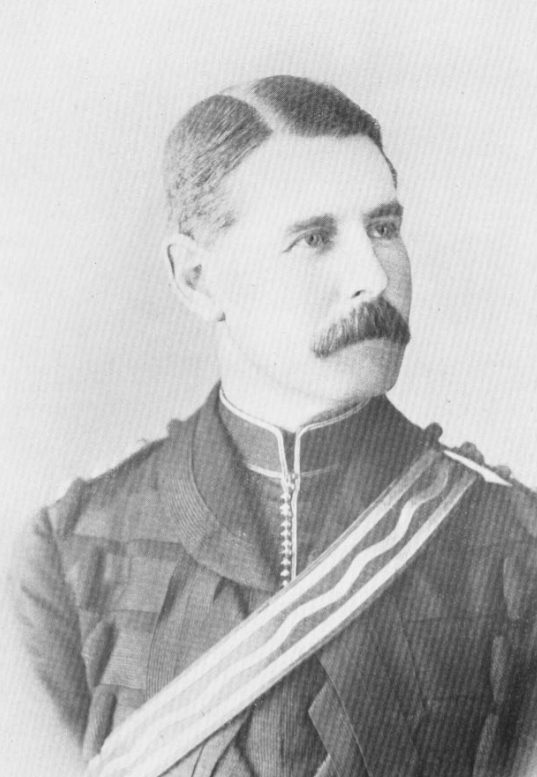
- Renny-Tailyour in about 1890
- Born: Henry Waugh Renny-Tailyour; 9 October 1849; Mussoorie, British India
- Died: 15 June 1920 (aged 70); Montrose, Scotland
- Education: Cheltenham College
- Occupations: Soldier; Sportsman; Businessman
- Employer: Guinness
- Known for: Association and rugby football international; first-class cricketer
Association football career
- Position: Forward
Senior career*
| Years | Team | Apps | (Gls) |
- Royal Engineers
International career
| 1873 | Scotland | 1 | (1) |
- * Club domestic league appearances and goals

Rugby union career
- Position: Forward
Amateur team(s)
| Years | Team | Apps | (Points) |
- Royal Engineers
International career
| Years | Team | Apps | (Points) |
| 1872 | Scotland | 1 | (0) |
- Cricket career

Cricket information
- Batting: Right-handed
- Bowling: Right arm fast (roundarm)
- Role: Batsman

Domestic team information
- Years: Team
- 1873–1883: Kent
- 1875: Marylebone Cricket Club (MCC)
- FC debut: 17 July 1873 Gentlemen v Players
- Last FC: 9 August 1883 Kent v Middlesex

Career statistics
| Competition | First-class |
|---|---|
| Matches | 28 |
| Runs scored | 818 |
| Batting average | 19.02 |
| 100s/50s | 1/4 |
| Top score | 124 |
| Balls bowled | 220 |
| Wickets | 5 |
| Bowling average | 17.40 |
| 5 wickets in innings | 0 |
| 10 wickets in match | 0 |
| Best bowling | 2/28 |
| Catches/stumpings | 16/0 |
- Source: ESPNcricinfo, 15 July 2009
- Military career
- Allegiance: United Kingdom
- Branch: British Army
- Rank: Colonel
- Unit: Royal Engineers

Henry Waugh Renny-Tailyour (9 October 1849 – 15 June 1920) was a British amateur all-round sportsman who appeared for Scotland in some of the earliest international football and rugby union matches, remaining to this day the only player to have represented the country in both codes. He also played first class cricket for Kent County Cricket Club and was an accomplished athlete.

== Biography ==
Renny-Tailyour was born at Mussoorie, North-Western Provinces (now in Uttarakhand) in what was then British India, while his Scottish father was serving in the army there. He grew up on the family estate at Newmanswalls, Montrose, Angus, and was educated at Cheltenham College before entering the British Army, joining the Royal Engineers. A lieutenant at the time of his sporting achievements in the 1870s and 1880s, he served in New South Wales, contributing to the publication of at least two reconnaissance maps of the Sydney area, and eventually reached the rank of colonel. After retiring from army service, he became managing director of the Guinness company. He died in Montrose.

== Football ==
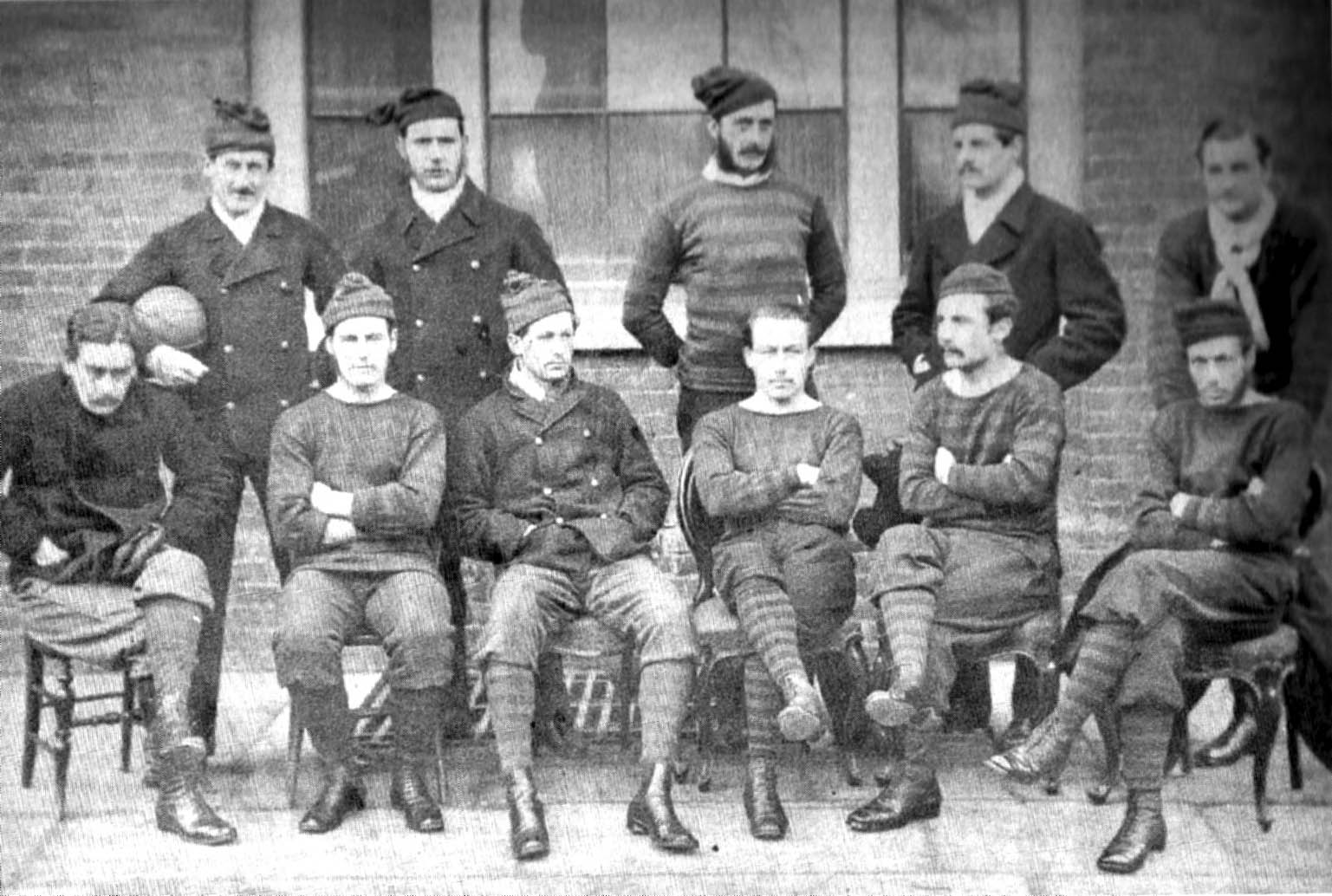
The Royal Engineers team of 1872. Eight of these players played in the first FA Cup Final. Renny-Tailyour is seated second from the left

Renny-Tailyour represented the Royal Engineers regimental team in the early days of organised football, when they were one of the strongest teams in England as a result of their innovative combination game. A forward, he played for the Royal Engineers in the first FA Cup Final in 1872, losing to the Wanderers. They returned in 1874 to face Oxford University, a match which they lost 2–0. The Engineers finally won the cup in 1875: 2–0, after a 1–1 draw, with Renny-Tailyour scoring in both matches against Old Etonians. This was his last cup final appearance.

Renny-Tailyour was selected to represent Scotland on two occasions. First he appeared against England at The Oval in London on 17 November 1871. This match, however, is not regarded as an official international, the Scottish team being entirely composed of London area residents. Renny-Tailyour was selected again in 1873, when England hosted an official international between the two countries for the first time. His residence again proved to be a factor, as the fledgling Scottish Football Association was only able to fund eight players to travel to London. It was therefore necessary to supplement the team with three others based in the south. Renny-Tailyour's goal in Scotland's 4–2 defeat at The Oval gave him the honour of scoring Scotland's first international goal.

His family connections with Montrose led to him being appointed as the local football club's Honorary President, 1887–88.

=== Honours ===
- FA Cup 1875

== Cricket ==
A middle order batsman and occasional bowler, Renny-Tailyour's cricketing career was restricted by his army service. He played mostly minor cricket, for the Royal Engineers Cricket Club, I Zingari, Strathmore and Aberdeenshire, but also played at first-class cricket level, albeit only 28 matches over a period of a decade. As well as representing Kent, Renny-Tailyor appeared for the Gentlemen in Gentlemen v Players matches, and also played in first class matches for Marylebone Cricket Club (MCC), Gentlemen of the South, the South of England and a combined Kent and Gloucestershire XI.

== Rugby ==
Renny-Tailyour also played for the Royal Engineers on the rugby field, and represented Scotland in one of that sport's earliest internationals, against England at The Oval in 1872.

== See also ==
- List of Scottish cricket and rugby union players
- List of Scotland international footballers born outside Scotland

== Bibliography ==
- Carlaw, Derek (2020). Kent County Cricketers, A to Z: Part One (1806–1914) (PDF). Cardiff: ACS.
