= Royal Engineers A.F.C. =

Association football club in England

Royal Engineers AFC
- Full name: Royal Engineers Association Football Club
- Nickname: Sappers
- Founded: 1863; 163 years ago
- Ground: Number one ground, Chatham
- Chair: Lt Col Chloe Plimmer
- Manager: Keith Stubbs
- League: Army Football Association
Home colours

The Royal Engineers Association Football Club is an association football team representing the Corps of Royal Engineers, the 'Sappers', of the British Army and based in Chatham, Kent. In the 1870s, it was one of the strongest sides in English football, winning the FA Cup in 1875 and being Cup finalists in three of the first four seasons. The Engineers were pioneers of the combination game, where teammates passed the ball to each other rather than kicking ahead and charging after the ball. With the rise of professional teams, in 1888 the Engineers joined a newly formed Army Football Association.

== History ==
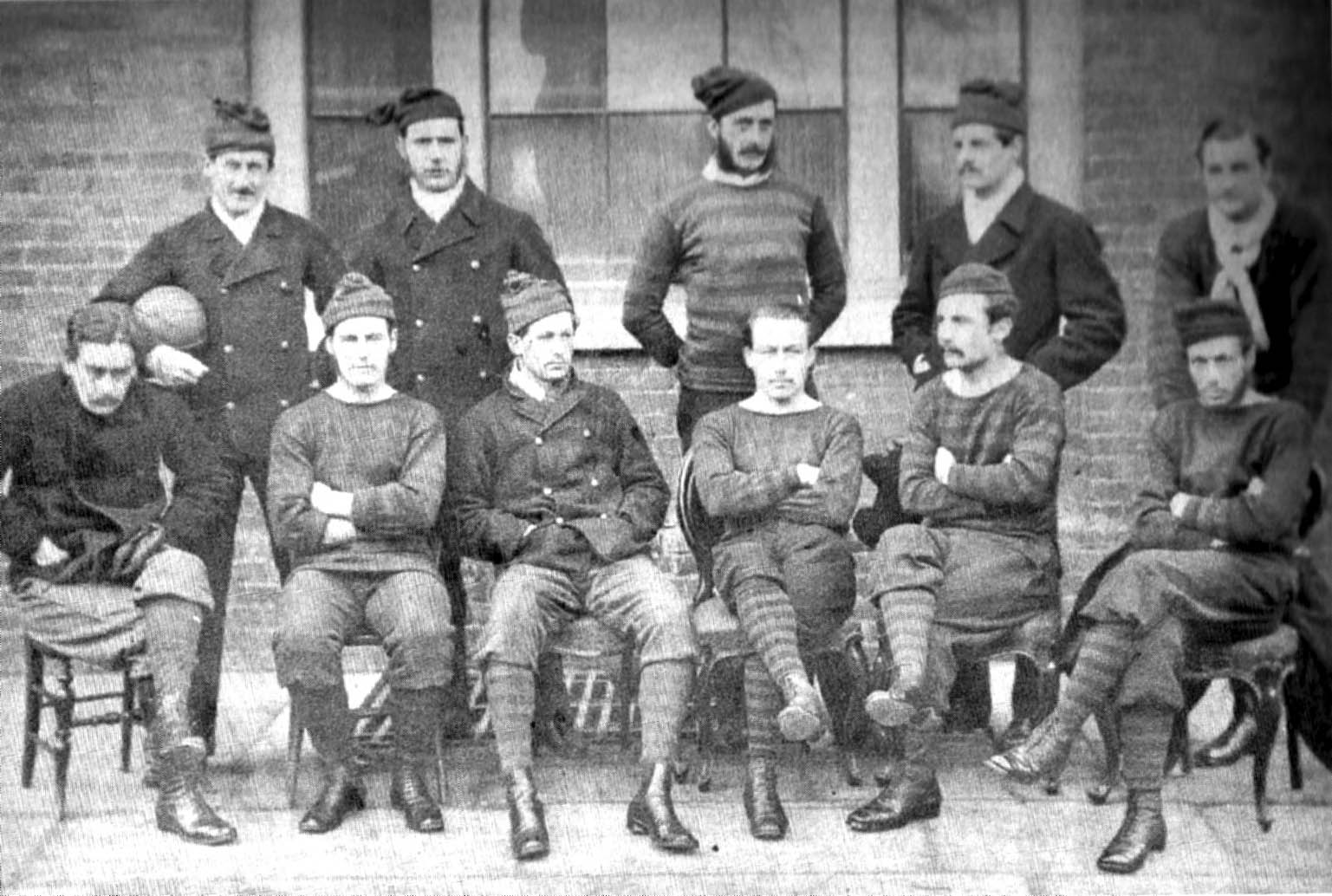
The Royal Engineers pictured in 1872. Back: Merriman, Ord, Marindin, Addison, Mitchell; Front: Hoskyns, Renny-Tailyour, Creswell, Goodwyn, Barker, Rich.

The club was founded in 1863, under the leadership of Major Francis Marindin, and adopted the association code permanently in October 1867; the earliest game recorded for the Engineers against a non-military side is a 3–0 home win over No Names Club in March 1867. Sir Frederick Wall, who was the secretary of The Football Association 1895–1934, stated in his memoirs that the "combination game" was first used by the Royal Engineers A.F.C. in the early 1870s. Wall states that the "Sappers moved in unison" and showed the "advantages of combination over the old style of individualism".

Contemporary match reports confirm that passing was a regular feature of the Engineers' style. An 1869 report says they "worked well together" and "had learned the secret of football success – backing up"; whereas their defeated opponents had "a painful want of cooperation". In February 1871 against Crystal Palace it is noted that "Lieut. Mitchell made a fine run down the left, passing the ball to Lieut. Rich, who had run up the centre, and who pinched another [goal]"

By early 1868, a contemporary match report states "For the R.E.s Lieuts Campbell, Johnson and Chambers attracted especial attention by their clever play"

Another contemporary match report clearly shows that by 1870, ball passing was a feature of the Engineers style: "Lieut. Creswell, who having brought it up the side then kicked it into the middle to another of his side, who kicked it through the posts the minute before time was called"

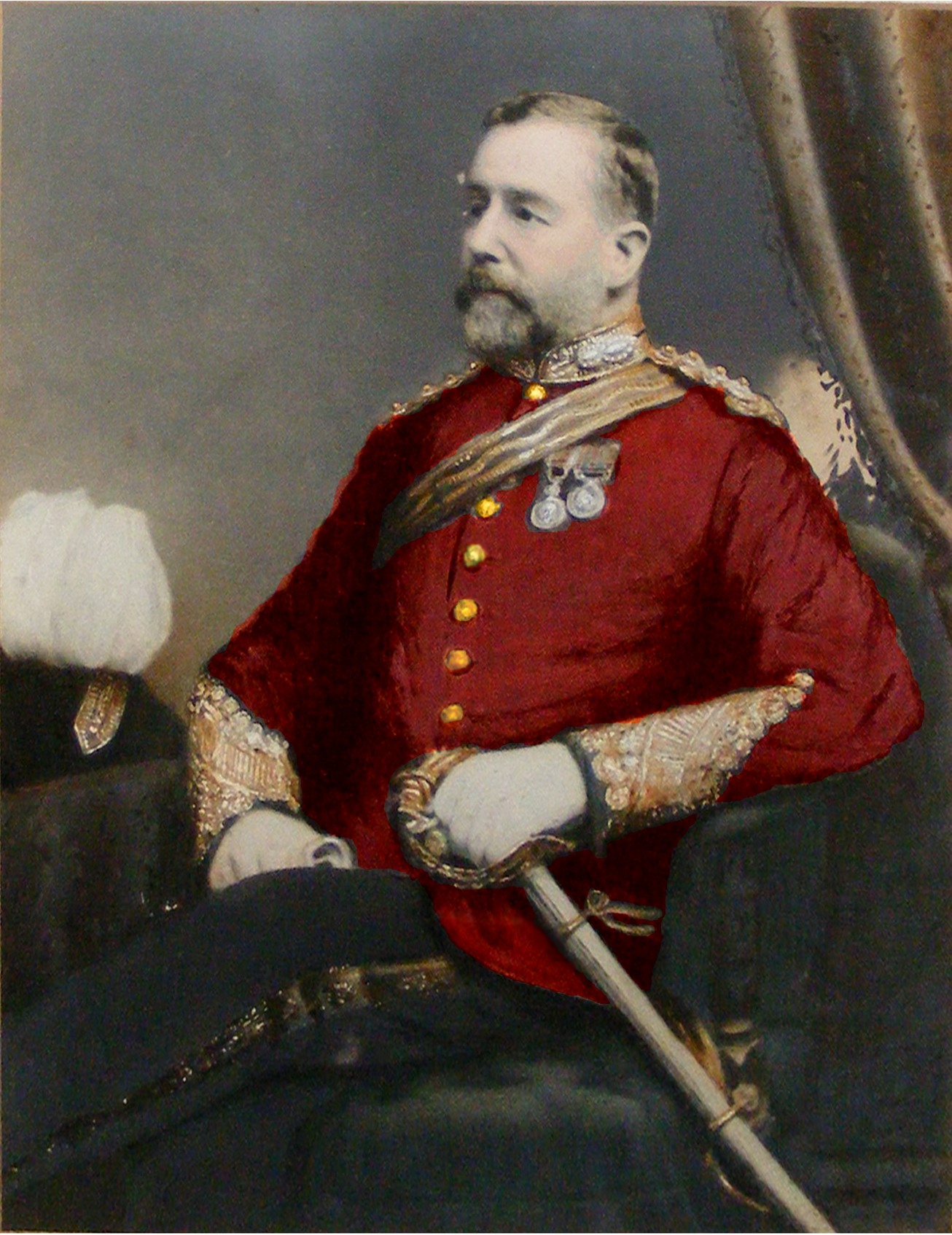
Colonel Thomas Tupper Carter-Campbell of Possil.

The Engineers used their team playing style with effect against the Wanderers, a side considered as early as 1870 to be the MCC of football. In a match of March 1871 against Wanderers their victory was due to "irreproachable organisation" and in particular that both their attacks and their backing up were both "so well organised" In November 1871 similar passing tactics are described in a contemporary account of a game against the Wanderers in which two goals were scored through tactical passing: "Betts, however, soon seized his opportunity, and by a brilliant run down the left wing turned the ball judiciously to Currie, who as judiciously sent it flying through the strangers' goal in first rate style" Later in the match it is reported that "Lieut G Barker, turning the ball to Lieut Renny-Tailyour who planted it between the posts" "Turning" the ball clearly points to the short pass.

There is evidence that opponents sometimes adjusted their playing style to counteract the organisation and passing of the Engineers. For example, in February 1872 against Westminster School, a brief contemporary match report states that: "The school captain took the precaution of strengthening his backs, deputizing HDS Vidal to cooperate with Rawson and Jackson and so well did these three play in concert... they succeeded in defying the... RE forwards". What is most notable about this report is that it confirms that the Royal Engineers "played beautifully together" That the engineers were the first side to break the trend of dribbling is shown in a contemporary account of their victory against Crystal Palace in early 1872. This said that: "very little dribbling was displayed"

The Engineers played in the first-ever FA Cup Final, losing 1–0 at Kennington Oval on 16 March 1872, to regular rivals Wanderers. They also lost the 1874 Final, to Oxford University A.F.C.

Part of the club's early success was due to Lieutenant Henry Waugh Renny-Tailyour, who was positioned as the Engineer's center forward. He was apart of their FA Cup campaigns in 1872, 1873, and 1874 - prior to their victory in 1875. A biographical memoir from a lifelong friend notes that his contribution to the Engineers went beyond the score sheet. They stated that "his keenness in the field was infectious, and made everyone play the game to the best of their abilities". Beyond the Engineers, Renny-Tailyour was among a few who got to represent Scotland under both association football and rugby.

The Royal Engineers were the first football team to go on a tour, to Nottingham, Derby and Sheffield in 1873. Wall's memoirs state that this tour introduced the combination game to Sheffield and Nottingham. In 1875 the Engineers won the FA Cup, considered their greatest triumph. In the final against Old Etonians, they drew 1–1 with a goal from Renny-Tailyour and went on to win the replay 2–0 with a further goal from Renny-Tailyour after a goal from a scrimmage.

The winning side was:

- Capt. W. Merriman; Lt. G.H. Sim; Lt. G.C. Onslow; Lt. R.M. Ruck; Lt. P.G. von Donop; Lt. C.K. Wood; Lt. H.E. Rawson; Lt. W.F.H. Stafford; Lt. H. W. Renny-Tailyour; Lt. A. Mein; and Lt. C. Wingfield-Stratford.

Their last FA Cup Final appearance came in 1878, again losing to the Wanderers. The Engineers continued to compete until the introduction of qualifying rounds in 1888–89, but with ever diminishing returns; in the first round in 1884–85, the club lost 10–1 at Great Marlow, the club's heaviest competitive defeat. Its final tie in the competition was a 5–1 defeat at the Crusaders of Brentwood in the first qualifying round in 1888–89.

=== Summary of the Royal Engineers early playing style ===
The evidence above contains detailed descriptions of passing that are lacking in reports of the 1872 Glasgow international. For example, in a lengthy account the Scotsman newspaper makes no mention of passing or combination by the Scottish team and specifically describes the Scottish attacks in terms of dribbling: "The Scotch now came away with a great rush, Leckie and others dribbling the ball so smartly that the English lines were closely besieged and the ball was soon behind" and "Weir now had a splendid run for Scotland into the heart of his opponents' territory". Although the Scottish team are acknowledged to have worked better together during the first half, this contemporary account acknowledges that in the second half England played similarly: "During the first half of the game the English team did not work so well together, but in the second half they left nothing to be desired in this respect." The Scotsman concludes that the difference in styles in the first half is the advantage the Queens' Park players had "through knowing each others' play" as all came from the same club. Unlike the 1872 Glasgow international, the contemporary evidence above shows that the Engineers' team playing style benefited their team play by winning games. Similarly, the 5 March 1872 match between Wanderers and Queens Park contains no evidence of ball passing.

The early accounts all confirm that the Engineers were the first club to play a passing game of cooperation and organisation with both their forwards and their defence. Although they could also play rough – as would be expected for an army team – The Engineers are the first side to be considered to play the football "beautifully". All of these developments occurred before and independent of the 1872 match between England and Scotland.

=== Ireland ===
It was not only in England that the Engineers helped pioneer association football. While stationed in Ireland during the early 1900s the Royal Engineers, together with other British Army regimental teams organised and competed in local competitions. In 1902–03 the Engineers won the Munster Senior Cup. The regiment also entered teams in the Munster Senior League.

=== Later years ===
Professionalism arrived in Northern England in the 1880s, with the Football League starting in 1888. In the early years, the Engineers was one of several amateur teams who could defeat the professionals in challenge matches.

The Army Football Association was formed in 1888. Its teams were organised by battalion, and later by regiment.

The Engineers' Depot Battalion won the FA Amateur Cup in 1908.

On 7 November 2012, the Royal Engineers played against the Wanderers in a rematch of the 1872 FA Cup Final at The Oval. Unlike the actual final, the Engineers won, and by a large margin, 7–1 being the final score.

Nowadays, the Engineers play in the Army FA Massey League, and compete in the Massey Trophy Division 1. The Massey League is made up of 2 divisions, with 6 teams in each, all made up of sides across different branches of the British Army. The Engineers won the Massey Trophy 4 times between 1994 and 2002, before the competition split into its current 2 division format in 2006. Since then, the team have always competed in the first division, winning it on 3 occasions. Alongside the league, the team also compete in the Army FA's Woolwich Cup, a cup competition between all teams in the Massey League. The Royal Engineers have lifted the Woolwich Cup a record 7 times since its introduction in 2006.

Ladies team

In 2014, Keith Stubbs founded the REAFC Ladies squad which runs in line with the male squad.

Veterans

REAFC have a serving veterans team that play in exhibition type games. Recently the "Vets" have played games against the House of parliament and invited to some prestigious events.

== Colours ==
The club has worn scarlet and blue hoops since its foundation in 1863.

== Ground ==
The club plays on the Chatham Lines, originally marking out a pitch where available, but now a formal set of pitches at the barracks.

== Honours ==
=== Cup Honours ===
- FA Cup
  - Winners: 1875
  - Runners-up: 1872, 1874, 1878
- FA Amateur Cup
  - Winners: 1908
- Munster Senior Cup
  - Winners: 1902–03

=== Army FA Massey League ===
Records only from 1993-94.

- Massey Trophy - Division 1
  - Winners: 2007–08, 2017–18, 2021–22
- Massey Trophy
  - Winners: 1994–95, 1998–99, 2000–01, 2001–02,
- Army FA Woolwich Cup
  - Winners: 2007–08, 2011–12, 2012–13, 2014–15, 2016–17, 2017–18, 2019–20
- Inter-Corps Quadrangular Tournament
  - Winners: 1976, 1984, 1985, 1986, 1989, 1995, 1999, 2002, 2008, 2010, 2016, 2018, 2019

=== Army FA Challenge Cup ===
Various regiments and battalions within the RE Corps have won the Army FA Challenge Cup:

Service Bn
Won 1903; Runners-up 1904, 1905
Depot Bn
Won 1907
Training Bn
Won 1937
Barton Stacey
Won 1947
4th Training Bn
Won 1950, 1957, 1958
4th Divisional Engineers
Won 1969
32nd Engineer Regiment
Won 1970; Runner-up 1971
Training Regiments
Won 1980; Runner-up 1991, 1993
28 [Amphibious] Engineer Regiment
Won 1981, 1990, 1991, 1992, 1993, 1994, 1996, 2000, 2001, 2002; Runner-up 1983, 1988
40 Army Engineer Support Group
Runner-up 1985

== International players ==
=== England ===
The following six Royal Engineers players played for England. The number of caps gained while playing for club is in brackets.

- Horace Barnet (1 cap)
- Alfred Goodwyn (1 cap)
- Herbert Rawson (1 cap)
- Bruce Russell (1 cap)
- Pelham von Donop (2 caps)
- Cecil Wingfield-Stratford (1 cap)

=== Scotland ===
The following played for Scotland.

- John Edward Blackburn (1 cap)
- Henry Renny-Tailyour (1 cap)
