= Alexander Bonsor =

English footballer

Personal information
- Full name: Alexander George Bonsor
- Date of birth: 7 October 1851
- Place of birth: Great Bookham, England
- Date of death: 17 August 1907 (aged 55)
- Place of death: Brussels, Belgium
- Position: Forward

Senior career*
Years	Team	Apps	(Gls)
1871–1873	Wanderers		
- Old Etonians

International career
1873–1875	England	2	(1)
- * Club domestic league appearances and goals

Alexander George Bonsor (7 October 1851 – 17 August 1907) was an English footballer, one of the earliest in the sport.

== Career ==
Bonsor played in the 1872 FA Cup Final – the first ever final in the FA Cup's history – and finished on the winning side. He played for the Wanderers that day, and with Wanderers he won the cup the following year as well.

Bonsor appeared in the 1875 final playing for Old Etonians, scoring a goal, as his side drew 1–1. They lost the replay, but Bonsor was back in the final the following year. He played for Old Etonians again, and scored again. Old Etonians drew that match 1–1 but, once again, lost the replay.

He played twice for England against Scotland. He also scored England's second-ever international goal against the latter during England's 4–2 victory in March 1873.

== Honours ==
Wanderers

- FA Cup winners: 1872 & 1873

Old Etonians

- FA Cup finalists: 1875 & 1876

== International goals ==
Scores and results list England's goal tally first.

#	Date	Venue	Opponent	Score	Result	Competition
1	8 March 1873	The Oval, Kennington	Scotland	1–0	4–2	Friendly
