= Bambridge =

Bambridge is a surname, and may refer to:

- Arthur Bambridge (1861–1923), England international footballer
- Charles Bambridge (1858–1935), England international footballer and captain
- Chris Bambridge (born 7 October 1947), Australian association football referee
- Ernest Bambridge (1848–1917), England international footballer
- George Bambridge (1892–1943), husband of Elsie Kipling, daughter of Rudyard Kipling
- Thomas Bambridge (d. c. 1750), warden of Fleet Prison in England
- William Samuel Bambridge (1820–1879), missionary in Waimate, New Zealand and photographer to Queen Victoria
- Willy Bambridge (1911–1953), French footballer born in Papeete, Tahiti
- Edwin Elijah Bambridge (1815–1879), a pioneer of the Australian Capital Territory who planted some of the first willow trees along the Molonglo River.
- Anthony Bambridge (1937–1997) Managing Editor The Sunday Times; co-author "Ambush"
