= Enoch Hood =

English footballer

Personal information
- Date of birth: 10 January 1861
- Place of birth: Middleport, Staffordshire, England
- Date of death: 6 February 1940 (aged 79)
- Place of death: May Bank, Newcastle-under-Lyme, England
- Position: Right winger

Youth career
- Porthill Victoria

Senior career*
Years	Team	Apps	(Gls)
1876–1885	Burslem Port Vale		
- * Club domestic league appearances and goals

Enoch "Tubby" Hood (10 January 1861 – 2 February 1940) was a founder member of Port Vale F.C. (1876) and was the first recorded team captain (1879). His brothers Jack and Harry, and nephew Edgar also played for Port Vale.

== Football career ==
Hood played for Porthill Victoria before becoming a founder member of Port Vale F.C., probably in 1879. The decision to found a new team was based on the fact that Porthill was inconveniently far away from Hood, and some other players wished to play closer to home. He was the captain of the first recorded Vale line-up on 9 December 1882, also scoring the goal of the 5–1 defeat to nearby Stoke. He scored in the replayed final of the North Staffordshire Charity Challenge Cup in 1883, which Vale won 4–2. Between November 1884 and April 1885, he played only the occasional match and from that point onwards was mainly a reserve and supporter.

== Other work ==
He worked as a potter for much of his life.

Hood was a lay preacher and member of the Burslem Brotherhood (a Christian social group). He was a highly respected member of the community, and his granddaughter, Edna Lamb, had many recollections of his work for charity, including collecting funds to kit out the local brass band for Christmas performances.

== Career statistics ==
Appearances and goals by club, season and competition
Club	Season	Total	
Club	Season	Apps	Goals
Burslem Port Vale	1882–83	2	2
Burslem Port Vale	1883–84	15	3
Burslem Port Vale	1884–85	10	1
Total		27	6
