= Arthur Bambridge =

English footballer (1861–1923)

Personal information
- Full name: Arthur Leopold Bambridge
- Date of birth: 16 June 1861
- Place of birth: Windsor, England
- Date of death: 27 November 1923 (aged 62)
- Place of death: England
- Positions: Full back; winger

Senior career*
Years	Team	Apps	(Gls)
- Windsor
- Upton Park
- Swifts
- Clapham Rovers
- Corinthian

International career
1881–1884	England	3	(1)
- * Club domestic league appearances and goals

Arthur Leopold Bambridge (16 June 1861 – 27 November 1923) was an English footballer who made three appearances either as a full back or as a right winger for England between 1881 and 1884. He was one of three brothers who played for England.

== Career ==
Arthur Bambridge was born in Windsor, Berkshire, the sixth child of Sophia (née Thorington) and William Samuel Bambridge, who had been a missionary in Waimate, New Zealand, and was then the photographer to Queen Victoria. He was educated at St Mark's School in Windsor.

His football career was spent with Windsor, Upton Park, Swifts, Clapham Rovers and Corinthian and he gained representative honours for Berkshire. According to the 1881 Football Annual, he was "useful; plays with judgement and is difficult to pass".

He made his debut for England, playing at left back against Wales on 26 February 1881. The match, played at Alexandra Meadows, Blackburn ended as a 1–0 victory for the Welsh. He was next selected two years later, again against the Welsh at the Kennington Oval on 3 February 1883; this time he played on the right wing, with his brother Charles on the left, as the English won comfortably 5–0, with Clement Mitchell scoring a hat trick.

His third and final England appearance came against Ireland on 23 February 1884. In this match, played at Ballynafeigh Park, Belfast, Arthur was again on the right with Charles on the left. Arthur scored his only international goal in this match (with Charles scoring twice) in an 8–1 victory.

His elder brother, Ernest, played one game for England in 1876. They are the only trio of brothers to have played for England.

== Outside football ==
After an injury ended his football career in 1884, he travelled the world, studying art, and produced a few minor paintings.
