= Windsor Home Park F.C. =

- Full name: Windsor Home Park Football Club
- Founded: 1870
- Dissolved: 1882 (became Windsor F.C.)
- Ground: Home Park
- Secretary: P. G. Chamberlain, E. C. Bambridge
Home colours

Windsor Home Park F.C. was an amateur football club who featured in the early years of the FA Cup.

== History ==
A cricket ground opened in Windsor Home Park in the summer of 1850, and Windsor Home Park Cricket Club started playing matches in that year. While there is some evidence of a "Home Park Football Club" existing in Windsor as early as 1854, this particular club was founded in September 1870, originally to play under "modified" association laws, and it played its first match on 3 December 1870 against St. Stanislaus College.

The club played regularly against local rivals such as Maidenhead F.C. and Great Marlow F.C. In 1872–73 the club entered the FA Cup for the first time. It beat Reigate Priory in the first round, at the Kennington Oval with the score given as 3 goals, plus one "in abeyance", to two. There was no referee for the match, so, after a Home Park goal was disputed for being offside, the teams continued with the decision to be left for the Football Association to rule, as was normal under the laws of the game at the time. As Home Park scored three undisputed goals, there was no need for an adjudication.

The second round tie with South Norwood, at the Kennington Oval, proved controversial, as both sides claimed to have won 1–0. Windsor Home Park claimed the South Norwood goal was the result of a handball, with which both umpires agreed, and South Norwood claimed that the Windsor Home Park goal the result of Home Park taking a corner that ought to have been a goal-kick. As at the time the referee's decision was subject to an appeal, the Football Association ordered a replay, which Home Park won easily.

The third round tie, with Maidenhead, was played at the Slough cricket pitch, as a neutral ground, as Home Park refused to toss for the choice of venue. Maidenhead won 1–0, and had one goal disallowed as it went directly through the goal from a free-kick; under the laws at the time, all free-kicks after a handball were indirect. The winning goal was from an early example of a corner kick (at the time, called a free-kick), which was landed at the feet of Hebbes, who made no mistake.

The club entered a second time in 1874–75, but did not play a match; first round opponents Uxbridge withdrew, and Home Park in turn withdrew when drawn to play Oxford University. The club's next competitive football came in the first edition of the Berks & Bucks Senior Cup in 1878–79, but Home Park lost 1–0 at home to Maidenhead.

The club entered the FA Cup twice more, in 1880–81 and 1881–82, both times exiting in the first round. The latter exit was controversial; the club was knocked out by Reading Minster, the Reading Observer reporting that Minster had won 1–0, with a disputed goal against which Home Park had made a protest, and the Windsor newspapers reporting the score as being 0–0. The Football Association rejected the protest. Home Park also exited the Berks & Bucks Cup in the first round both years, losing 5–0 at home to Reading in 1879–80 and 1–0 at home to Grosvenor F.C. in 1880–81, in front of fewer than 600 spectators.

In September 1882, the club amalgamated Grosvenor to form Windsor Football Club.

== Notable players ==
- Three of the Bambridge brothers - Ernest Bambridge, Charles Bambridge, and Arthur Bambridge - played for Home Park before joining Swifts. Ernest and Arthur both scored in the Cup tie against Reigate Priory.
- Francis Heron, future England international, played in the 1872–73 season.

== Colours ==
The club's colours were blue and black hoops.

== Ground ==
The club played at Home Park in Windsor, a two-minute walk from Windsor railway station. It used the Royal Oak in Datchet Road for changing facilities.
