= 1878–79 in English football =

Football in England
- Season: 1878–79

Men's football
- FA Cup: Old Etonians

The 1878–79 season was the eighth season of competitive football in England.

== National team ==
For the first time, England played a team other than Scotland. England played both Scotland and Wales at Kennington Oval, London, beating Wales 2–1. This match was played in atrocious weather conditions with the team captains agreeing to play only 30 minutes in each half. England gained revenge on Scotland for the previous year's debacle by beating them 5–4.

Date	Opponents	Score	England scorers	Wales scorers
18 January 1879	Wales	2–1	Herbert Whitfeld (Old Etonians) (8 mins) & Thomas Sorby (Thursday Wanderers) (20 mins)	William Henry Davies

Date	Opponents	Score	England scorers	Scotland scorers
5 April 1879	Scotland	5–4	Billy Mosforth (The Wednesday) (5 mins), Charles Bambridge (Swifts) (48 & 83 mins), Arthur Goodyer (Nottingham Forest) (60 mins) & Norman Bailey (Clapham Rovers) (75 mins)	William Muir MacKinnon (2), John McDougall, Dr John Smith

Note – TheFa.com credits England's 4th (equalising) goal against Scotland as an own goal by the Scottish goalkeeper, Robert Parlane.

== Honours ==
Competition	Winner
FA Cup	Old Etonians (1)

Notes = Number in parentheses is the times that club has won that honour. * indicates new record for competition
