= William Bambridge =

English missionary and photographer (1819–1879)

- Born: 24 October 1819; Windsor
- Died: 1 May 1879 (aged 59); Wandsworth
- Known for: Royal photographer
- Children: Arthur Bambridge; Charles Bambridge; Ernest Bambridge; George Bambridge
- Parent(s): George White Bambridge and his second wife Harriet

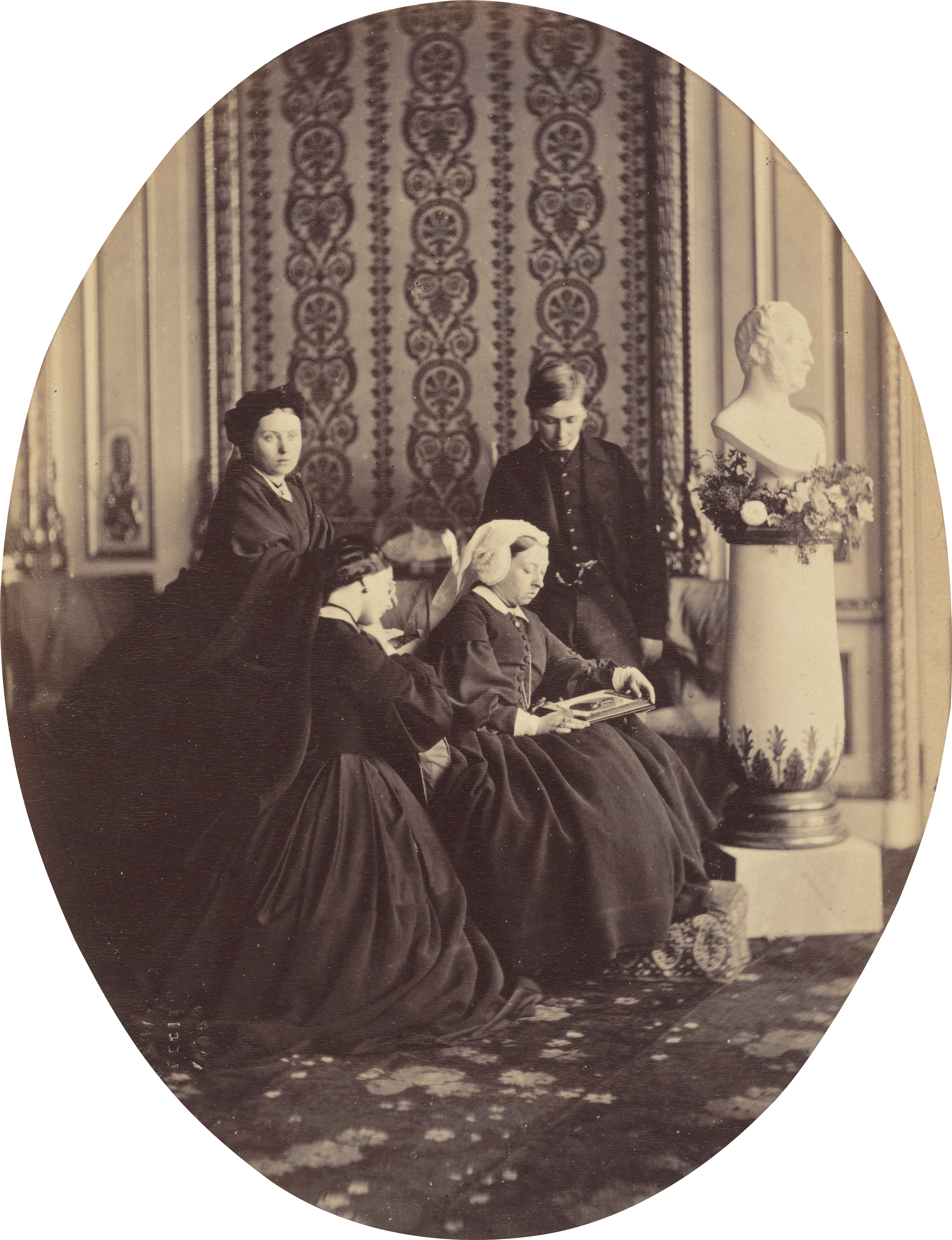
Queen Victoria in Mourning

William Samuel Bambridge (24 October 1819 – 1 May 1879) was a school-teacher who accompanied George Augustus Selwyn and William Charles Cotton in the Te Waimate mission, New Zealand, before returning to England where he became photographer to Queen Victoria. Three of his sons became England international footballers.

== Career ==
Bambridge was born in Windsor, Berkshire, England, the second son of George White Bambridge and his second wife, Harriet. His father was a professional flautist whose first wife had died within two years of their marriage. He had three children with Harriet who died in June 1821, shortly after the birth of her third son. George remarried in December 1848 and his third wife, Mary, bore him three children, the last of whom was born in December 1853, when George was 64. George died in September 1860.

=== Missionary ===
William Bambridge married Sophia Thorington at Clewer on 2 November 1841. Bambridge had trained as a teacher and was recruited by Selwyn who had recently been appointed as the first bishop for New Zealand. Selwyn had been parish priest at Windsor and a tutor at Eton College and recruited most of the other clergy and ordinands from the surrounding area of Eton and Windsor to accompany him on his mission. The party also included William Charles Cotton who had been appointed as chaplain. The missionary party of 23 members set sail from Plymouth late on 26 December 1841 on board the barque Tomatin. In April 1842, the Tomatin arrived in Sydney. The boat was damaged by a rock on entering their landing place and, rather than wait for its repair, some of the party, including Selwyn, Cotton and Bambridge, set sail for New Zealand on the brig Bristolian on 19 May. They arrived in Auckland on 30 May. After spending some time as guests of Captain William Hobson, the first Governor of New Zealand, they set sail for the Bay of Islands on the schooner Wave on 12 June, arriving on 20 June.

Selwyn had decided to set up residence at the Waimate Mission Station, some 15 miles (24 km) inland from Paihia where the Church Missionary Society had established a settlement 11 years earlier. Waimate was to be the Anglican ecclesiastical centre for the whole of New Zealand, and to that end Selwyn had planned for the training of ordinands; a school for Maori and missionary children; farming and agriculture; workshops for printing and carpentry, all with a view to becoming self-supporting, and all to be under the name of St John's College. It was to become a power house to fuel the spread of the Gospel throughout New Zealand and the islands beyond. Bambridge spent his days in the schoolroom teaching reading, writing, arithmetic, drawing, singing and religious knowledge. His contributions to Cotton's journal testify to his beautiful copperplate hand writing and facility in drawing.

Like his father, Bambridge was a keen musician and a flautist of some competence; with other members of the party, they entertained the missionaries with chamber music. Bambridge was also an accomplished artist and recorded the Mission buildings, occupants, scenery and activities by drawing and water colour.

In July 1842, Sophia gave birth to her first child, also called William Samuel with George Frederic being born in April 1844.

Later in 1844, Selwyn decided to move some 160 miles (257 km) south to West Tamaki near Auckland where he bought 450 acres (1.8 km^{2}) of land, giving it the name of Bishop's Auckland. The party left on 23 October and arrived in Auckland on 17 November. William and Sophia's third child, Sophia Esther, was born in August 1846 at Purewa. By now, Sophia was struggling with the rigours of life in the mission and was longing to return to England. Eventually, Selwyn was persuaded to release Bambridge from his contract and the family finally left New Zealand in December 1847, together with Cotton, arriving back in England in May 1848.

=== Photographer ===
Shortly after arriving back in England, Bambridge joined the studio of William Fox Talbot in the castle at Windsor. In 1854, he was appointed the Royal Photographer to Queen Victoria, remaining in the Queen's employment for 14 years. His subjects include not only members of the royal family and their pets but also still life, scenes from the royal hunts etc. Many of his photographs are now housed in the Royal Collection. Bambridge used the wet collodion process invented by Frederick Scott Archer on glass plate negatives.

One striking photograph in the collection is a portrait of Hare Pomare, a Māori chief who was visiting Windsor shortly after the death of Prince Albert. During the visit, the chief's wife gave birth and Queen Victoria was godmother at the christening of the child, named Albert Victor Pomare. Bambridge was called on to photograph the christening. Hare Pomare was also to feature in the works of William Strutt.

Bambridge died in Wandsworth, London, in May 1879 and is buried in Clewer churchyard, along with his brother George, and his father. His death certificate states that he died from "Exhaustion and Paralysis".

== Children ==
William and Sophia had six children of whom the latter three sons were all born at Windsor between 1849 and 1861. All the sons were keen footballers. The first-born son, William Samuel became Professor of Music and Organist at Marlborough College and named his home in the town of Marlborough, "The Waimate". The publication of one of his letters in "The Field" regarding the problems in using local rules in football contributed to establishment of one set of laws by the Football Association in April 1877.

His first son, William Herbert Bambridge, died at Béthune, France, in the First World War. The second son, George Frederic became Secretary to Prince Alfred, Duke of Edinburgh. His son George Louis St Clair Bambridge married Elsie, daughter of Rudyard Kipling.

The three younger sons all joined the local Swifts team from where they were selected to play for the England national team. The eldest of the three, Ernest, made only one appearance for his country whilst his younger brothers, Charles and Arthur played 18 and 3 times respectively for England. Charles was the first player to score ten international goals for England and was twice appointed England's captain.
