= 1884–85 in English football =

Football in England
- Season: 1884–85

Men's football
- FA Cup: Blackburn Rovers

The 1884–85 season was the 14th season of competitive football in England.

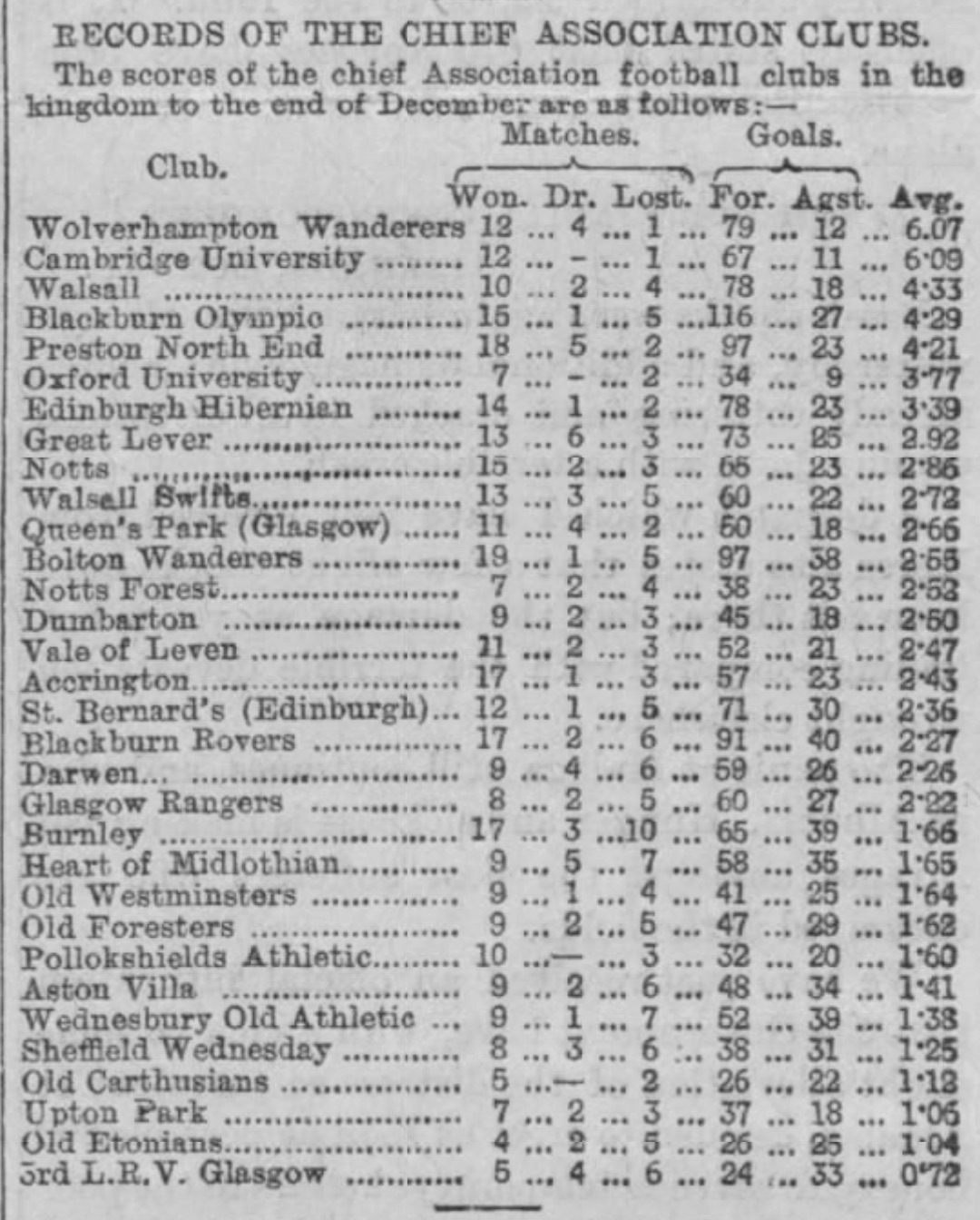
An early form of football league table, with clubs sorted by goal average. Manchester Courier, 5 January 1885

== British Football Association ==
On 23 October 1884, a number of members of the Lancashire Football Association, at the instigation of Bolton Wanderers, met in Blackburn with a view to resisting new Football Association legislation restricting the ability of clubs to "import" players. The result was the formation of a new association, the British Football Association, made up of Lancashire clubs, plus Aston Villa and Walsall Swifts, and Sunderland provisionally joining, pending a club committee vote; the main refusenik was Blackburn Rovers, which had already "grandfathered" in its imported players, having been the first club to do so en masse.

The breakaway was forestalled in July 1885, when the Football Association voted to allow professional players to take part in football competitions, by 35 votes to 12, and the BFA was no longer necessary.

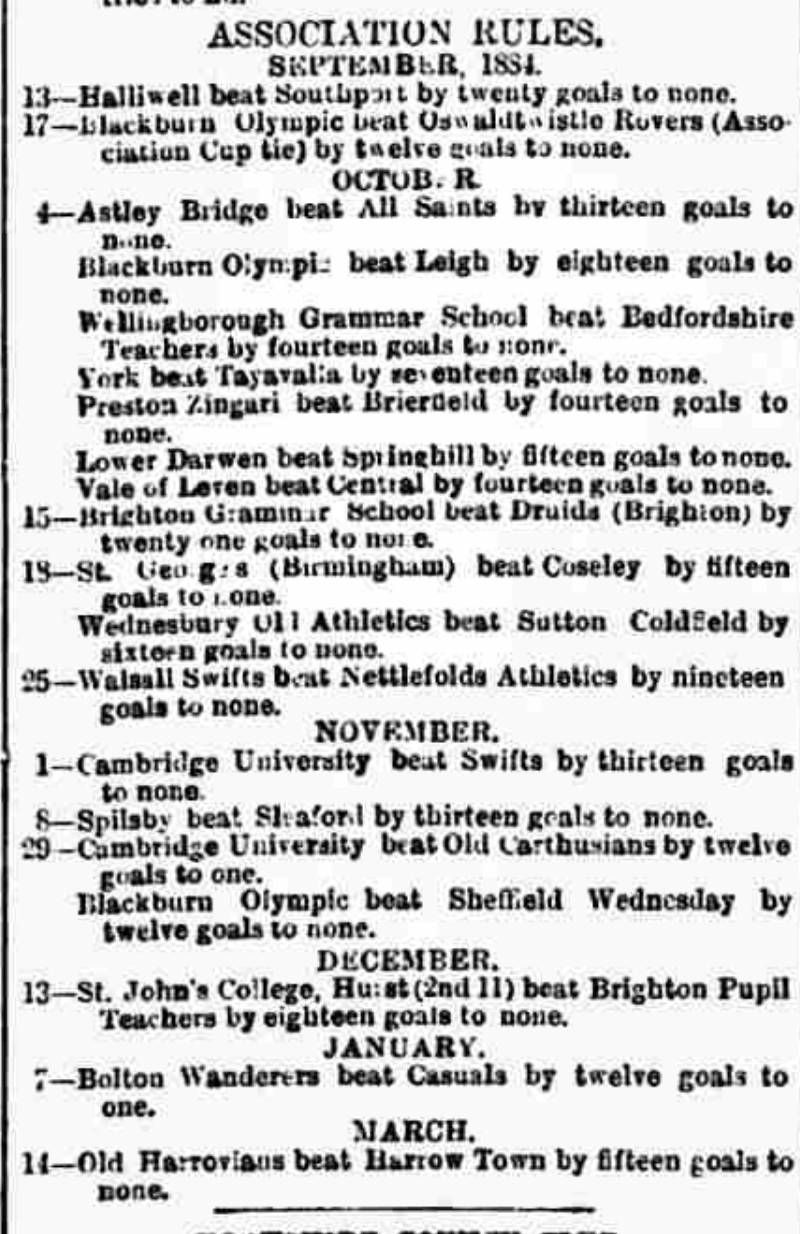
Biggest wins of 1884–85, from the Sportsman, 28 March 1885. NB: "York" is Yoker F.C. and the win was, at the time, the biggest-ever Scottish Cup win.

== National team ==
England finished second in the British Home Championship, which was won by Scotland.

Date	Venue	Opponents	Score*	Comp	England scorers
28 February 1885	Whalley Range, Manchester (H)	Ireland	4–0	BHC	Charles Bambridge (Swifts), James Brown (Blackburn Rovers) & Benjamin Spilsbury (Cambridge University); William Eames (Own goal)
14 March 1885	Leamington Road, Blackburn (H)	Wales	1–1	BHC	Clement Mitchell (Upton Park) (35 mins)
21 March 1885	Kennington Oval, London (H)	Scotland	1–1	BHC	Charles Bambridge (Swifts) (57 mins)

* England score given first

Key

- H = Home match
- BHC = British Home Championship

Note – Some sources credit England's third goal as a Joe Lofthouse goal, but match reports clearly state an Eames own goal.

== Honours ==
Competition	Winner
FA Cup	Blackburn Rovers (2)
Home Championship	Scotland

Notes = Number in parentheses is the times that club has won that honour. * indicates new record for competition
