= 1880–81 in English football =

Football in England
- Season: 1880–81

Men's football
- FA Cup: Old Carthusians

The 1880–81 season was the tenth season of competitive football in England.

== International matches ==
England played their first home match outside London when they hosted Wales at Alexandra Meadows in Blackburn.

Date	Venue	Opponents	Score*	England scorers	Scotland/Wales scorers
26 February 1881	Alexandra Meadows, Blackburn	Wales	0–1		John Vaughan
12 March 1881	Kennington Oval, London	Scotland	1–6	Charles Bambridge (Swifts) (64 mins)	David Hill, Edgar Field (own goal), George Ker (2), Dr John Smith (2)

* England score given first

== Honours ==
Competition	Winner
FA Cup	Old Carthusians (1)

Notes = Number in parentheses is the times that club has won that honour. * indicates new record for competition
