= 1883–84 in English football =

Football in England
- Season: 1883–84

Men's football
- FA Cup: Blackburn Rovers

The 1883–84 season was the 13th season of competitive football in England.

Since 1880, Bolton Wanderers (founded in 1874), was known to have unofficially offered professional terms to Scottish players ("Scotch Professors"). The subject remained a heated one through the 1880s, directly or indirectly involving many other clubs besides Bolton. Their neighbours, Blackburn Rovers (founded in 1875) and Darwen (founded in 1870) had also signed Scottish players on a 'shamateur' basis using side jobs, either real or fabricated, to facilitate payment. The FA espoused the ideal of amateurism promoted by the likes of Corinthian F.C. from whom the phrase "Corinthian Spirit" came into being.

== Overview ==
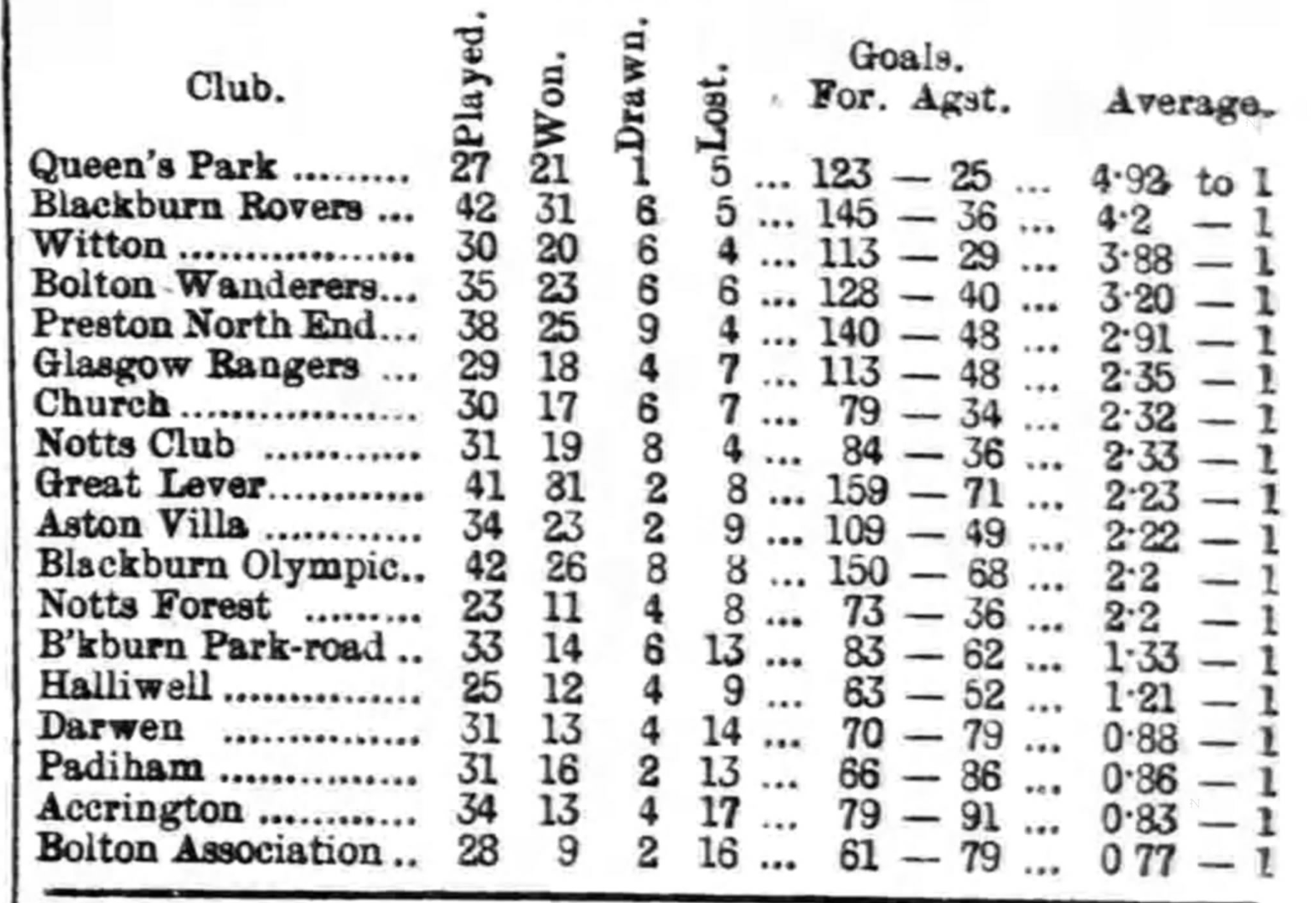
A football merit table from the 1883–84 season with a bias towards Lancashire, Blackburn Weekly Standard, 5 April 1884

1883–1884 saw the world's first international tournament begin. The British Home Championship pitted the UK's four national teams (England, Scotland, Wales and Ireland) against each other in a league competition in which each played the other three once. Scotland won the first contest with England finishing second.

== National team ==
Date	Venue	Opponents	Score*	Comp	England scorers	Other scorers
23 February 1884	Ballynafeigh Park, Belfast (A)	Ireland	8–1	BHC	Henry Cursham (Notts County) (3), Edward Johnson (Stoke) (2), Charles Bambridge (Swifts) (2) & Arthur Bambridge (Swifts)	William BR McWha
15 March 1884	Cathkin Park, Glasgow (A)	Scotland	0–1	BHC		Dr John Smith
17 March 1884	Racecourse Ground, Wrexham (A)	Wales	4–0	BHC	William Bromley-Davenport (Oxford University) (7 & 85 mins), Norman Bailey (Clapham Rovers) (75 mins) & Billy Gunn (Notts County) (90 mins)	

* England score given first

Key

- A = Away match
- BHC = British Home Championship

== Honours ==
Competition	Winner
FA Cup	Blackburn Rovers (1)
Home Championship	Scotland

Notes = Number in parentheses is the times that club has won that honour. * indicates new record for competition

== Events ==
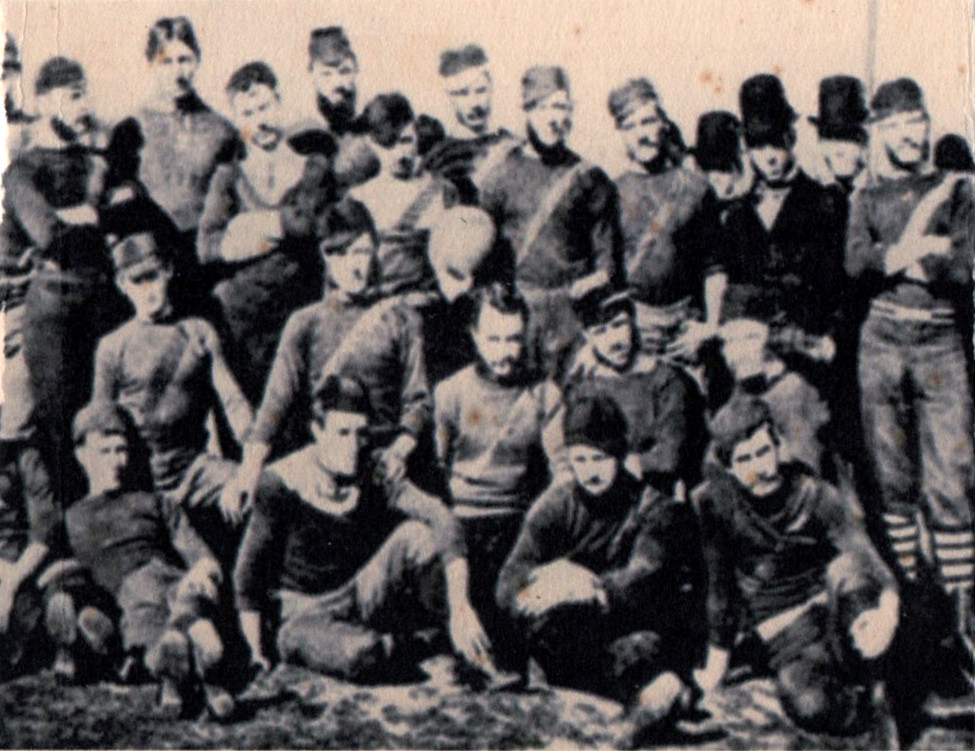
Bristol Rovers were founded in the 1883–84 season as the Black Arabs Football Club

- 5 February 1884 – Derby County Football Club is founded
- Black Arabs F.C. season 1883–84 (inaugural season of today's Bristol Rovers F.C.)
- Everton moves as tenant to Anfield, a newly enclosed ground off Anfield Road, Liverpool.
- Leicester City founded as Leicester Fosse.
