= 1882–83 in English football =

Football in England
- Season: 1882–83

Men's football
- FA Cup: Blackburn Olympic

The 1882–83 season was the 12th season of competitive football in England.

When the Football Association football was formed in 1863, the sport was played mainly by public schools, or teams with public school roots, and amateurism was the norm. This remained the case until the 1880s, when working-class teams began to vie for supremacy. Blackburn Olympic, a team composed mainly of factory workers, won the 1883 FA Cup Final. They were the first working-class team to win the competition since its inception in 1870. Though professionalism was not permitted, Olympic arranged jobs for their players, and supplemented their income with additional payments, a common occurrence among Lancashire clubs.

== National team ==
Date	Venue	Opponents	Score*	England scorers	Scottish scorer
3 February 1883	Kennington Oval, London, (H)	Wales	5–0	Charles Bambridge (Swifts) (43 mins), Clement Mitchell (Upton Park) (16, 70 & 90 mins) & Arthur Cursham (Notts County) (65 mins)	
24 February 1883	Liverpool Cricket Club (H)	Ireland	7–0	Oliver Whateley (Aston Villa) (15 & 47 mins), William Cobbold (Cambridge University) (17 & 19 mins), Arthur Dunn (Cambridge University) (43 & 80 mins) & Francis Pawson (Cambridge University) (88 mins)	
10 March 1883	Bramall Lane, Sheffield (H)	Scotland	2–3	Clement Mitchell (Upton Park) (24 mins) & William Cobbold (Cambridge University) (43 mins)	Dr John Smith (3)

* England score given first

Key

- H = Home match

== Honours ==
Competition	Winner
FA Cup	Blackburn Olympic (1)

Notes = Number in parentheses is the times that club has won that honour. * indicates new record for competition
