= Charles Bambridge =

English footballer (1858–1935)

Personal information
- Full name: Edward Charles Bambridge
- Date of birth: 30 July 1858
- Place of birth: Windsor, England
- Date of death: 8 November 1935 (aged 77)
- Place of death: Surrey, England
- Position: Winger

Senior career*
Years	Team	Apps	(Gls)
- Swifts
- Windsor Home Park
- Streatham
- Upton Park
- Clapham Rovers
1886–1889	Corinthian		

International career
1879–1887	England	18	(11)
- * Club domestic league appearances and goals

Edward Charles Bambridge (30 July 1858 – 8 November 1935) was an English footballer who made eighteen appearances as a left winger for England between 1879 and 1887, being appointed captain twice. He was one of three brothers who played for England.

He was an extremely fast winger, being considered one of England's first notable players. Throughout his career he was known as "Charlie Bam".

== Career ==
Charles Bambridge was born in Windsor, Berkshire, the fifth child of Sophia (née Thorington) and William Samuel Bambridge, who had been a missionary in Waimate, New Zealand, and then the photographer to Queen Victoria. He was educated at St Mark's School in Windsor and then Malvern College in Malvern, Worcestershire, and was a member of the college football team.

His football career was spent with Swifts, Windsor Home Park, Streatham, Upton Park, Clapham Rovers and Corinthian, also gaining representative honours for Surrey, Berkshire and London.

He made his debut for England against Scotland at Kennington Oval on 5 April 1879. At half time, England were 4–1 down to the Scots. Bambridge scored early in the second half and his teammates had levelled the score by the 75th minute. With less than ten minutes remaining, the Scots scored what they thought was the winning goal but the referee disallowed it as offside. The English forwards then raced upfield with Bambridge scoring the winning goal, thus enabling England to claim their first victory over the Scots since 1873 in what was described as "the most exciting England and Scotland game to date".

His next England appearance came a year later on 13 March 1880 and was another exciting encounter in which Bambridge again scored twice. This time it was the Scots who were the winners, 5–4, with a hat trick from George Ker. Bambridge scored against the Scots again in the following year's international, a consolation goal in a 6–1 defeat.

He was appointed captain for the first match between England and Ireland played at Bloomfield, Belfast on 18 February 1882. Ireland were "totally dominated by the visitors" who won the game 13–0, with Bambridge scoring once. The other goal scorers included Aston Villa forwards Howard Vaughton who scored five and Arthur Brown with four.

In the match against Wales on 13 March 1882, Bambridge left the field after only three minutes because of injury, and England played on with ten men, losing 5–3 with two late goals for the Welsh. The English gained their "revenge" the following year with a 5–0 victory in which Bambridge scored once, with Clement Mitchell scoring a hat-trick. In this match, his younger brother Arthur played on the right wing. For the match against Ireland on 23 February 1884, Charles again played alongside Arthur; both brothers scored in an 8–1 victory, with Charles scoring twice, but he again left the pitch with an injury after 75 minutes.

He continued to be selected regularly for England over the next few years, scoring against the Irish and the Scots in 1885. His second captaincy came in a 7–0 victory over the Irish on 5 February 1887, in which Tinsley Lindley scored a hat-trick. His final England appearance came a month later against Scotland on 19 March.

He was a member of the Football Association committee from 1883 to 1886 and a member of the Corinthians original committee in 1882. He became honorary secretary of the Corinthians between 1923 and 1932.

=== Achievements ===
Bambridge holds several records and distinctions. He scored 11 goals in 18 appearances for England, with an average goals per game rate of 0.61.

England's list of all-time top goalscorers is skewed towards more recent players, in large part, due to the sheer number of games played in the modern game but Bambridge has the distinction of having been England's top scorer in 1879, 1881 and 1885 which places him as 8th player for the most number of years as top scorer and 4th for most years as outright top scorer (excluding joint first places), a record bested only by Vivian Woodward, Gary Lineker and Michael Owen, with four, five and six exclusive top scoring years, respectively. He held the overall England goalscoring record, either jointly or alone, from his debut against Scotland in 1879 until his final tally of 11 was overhauled by Tinsley Lindley in 1890.

The 13–0 routing of Ireland on 18 February 1882, when Bambridge was captain, is England's highest ever winning margin. In this match, three Old Malvernians were present, including Bambridge; the others being Doctor Greenwood and Fred Hargreaves.

Bambridge is also said to have played in a cup tie with a broken leg, and scored the winning goal.

Two of his brothers, Arthur and Ernest, also played for England, making three and one appearances, respectively. They are the only trio of brothers to have played for England.

== Outside football ==
Bambridge earned his living as a Lloyd's underwriter, but went "broke" at Lloyd's in 1909.

He married Kathleen Sylvia Bailey on 13 August 1862 and had four children. Two of his sons, Rupert and Frederick, were killed in France during the First World War. His grandson, Anthony Charles Bambridge, was managing director of Colmans Foods in the 1970s.

Charles died on 8 November 1935, aged 77. His widow, Kathleen, lived on until 1960 and died at the age of 97.
