= Frank Saunders (footballer) =

English footballer

Personal information
- Full name: Frank Etheridge Saunders
- Date of birth: 26 August 1864
- Place of birth: Brighton, England
- Date of death: 14 May 1905 (aged 40)
- Position: Centre half

Senior career*
| Years | Team | Apps | (Gls) |
- Swifts

International career
| 1888 | England | 1 | (0) |
- * Club domestic league appearances and goals

Frank Etheridge Saunders (26 August 1864 – 14 May 1905) was an English international footballer, who played as a centre half.

== Career ==
Born in Brighton, Saunders played for Swifts, and earned one cap for England in 1888. He also played numerous times for Gloucester City.
