= Football in England =

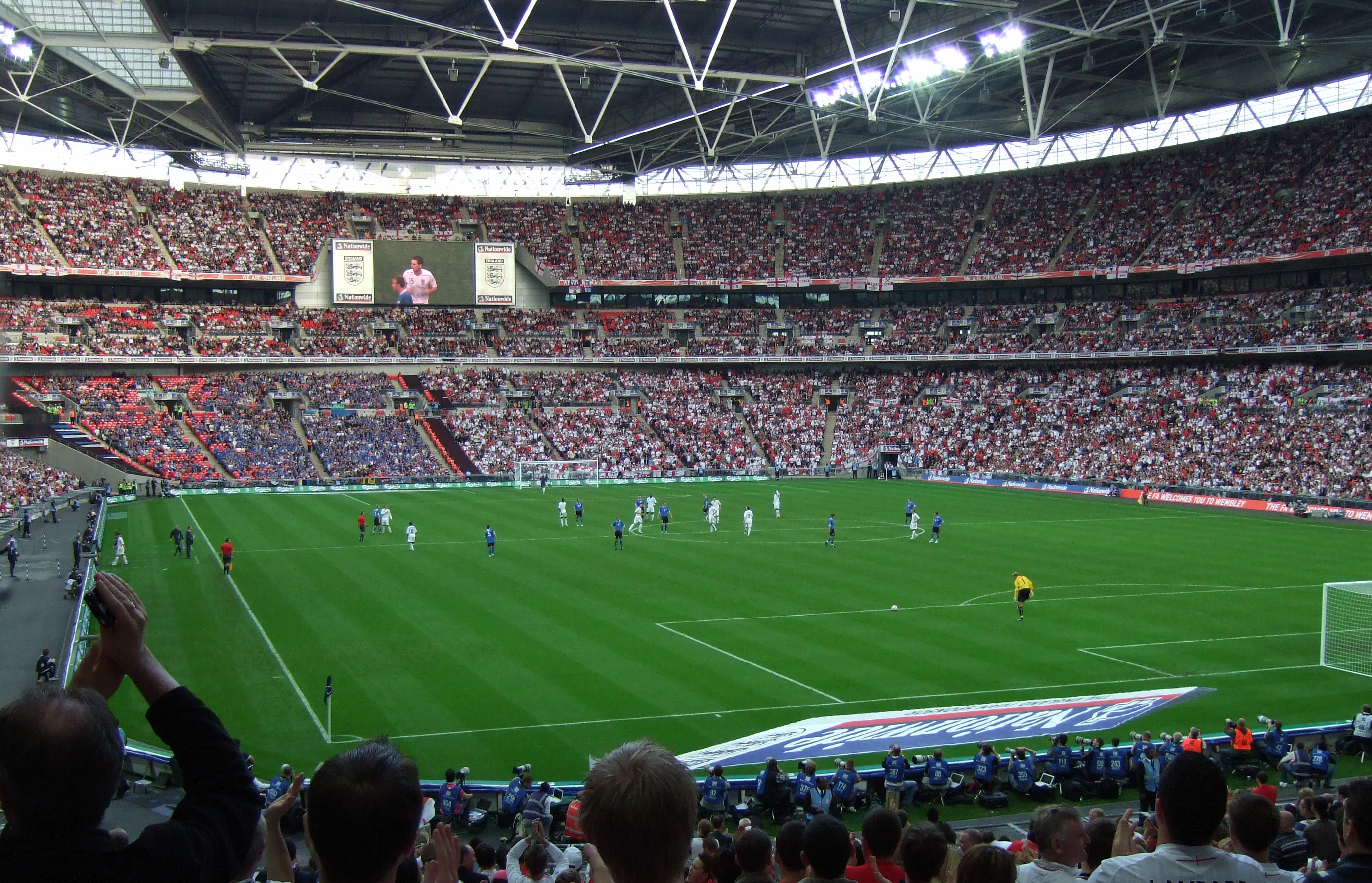
- The England national football team playing at Wembley Stadium in 2008
- Country: England
- Governing body: The Football Association (FA)
- National team: Men's · women's
- First played: 1863; 163 years ago
- Registered players: 800,000+
- Clubs: 40,000+ clubs (organised into 600+ leagues)

National competitions
- Men's competition: FIFA World Cup; UEFA European Championship; UEFA Nations League; Women's competition: FIFA Women's World Cup; UEFA Women's Championship; UEFA Women's Nations League

Club competitions
- League: Men's competition Premier League EFL Championship EFL League One EFL League Two National League National League North National League South Isthmian League Northern Premier League Southern Football League Northern Premier League Premier Division Southern Football League Premier Central Southern Football League Premier South Isthmian League Premier Division; Women's competition FA Women's Super League; FA Women's Championship; FA Women's National League North; FA Women's National League South: Cups: Men's competition FA Cup EFL Cup FA Community Shield EFL Trophy FA Trophy FA Vase FA Inter-League Cup Women's competition Women's FA Cup FA Women's League Cup Women's FA Community Shield

International competitions
- Men's competition: FIFA Club World Cup; FIFA Intercontinental Cup; UEFA Champions League; UEFA Europa League; UEFA Conference League; UEFA Super Cup; Women's competition: FIFA Women's Club World Cup; FIFA Women's Champions Cup; UEFA Women's Champions League; UEFA Women's Europa Cup

Football is the most popular sport in England. Widely regarded as the birthplace of modern football, the first official rules of the game were established in England in 1863. The country is home to the world's first football league, the oldest national governing body, and the oldest national knockout competition. With over 40,000 football clubs, England has more teams involved in the sport than any other country. The world's first football club, Sheffield F.C., and the oldest professional club, Notts County, were both founded in England.

The influence of the British Empire helped spread football across the globe, shaping the development of the modern Laws of the Game. England's domestic football scene remains one of the strongest in the world, with the Premier League ranking among the richest and most popular leagues globally. As of 2024, six of the ten richest football clubs were English. Football remains deeply ingrained in English culture, with 31% of the population expressing an interest in the sport.

The England national football team is one of only eight teams to have won the FIFA World Cup, lifting the trophy once, in 1966. The team played in the first international match in 1872 and has since qualified for the World Cup 16 times. 78% of the British people were interested in following, listening or watching the 2022 FIFA World Cup.

English club teams have also enjoyed success on the European stage, with six clubs winning the UEFA Champions League, previously known as the European Cup.

== History of the men's game ==
=== Middle Ages ===
Football was played in England as far back as medieval times. The first written evidence of a football match came in about 1170, when William Fitzstephen wrote of his visit to London, "After dinner all the youths of the city goes out into the fields for the very popular game of ball." He also went on to mention that each trade had their own team, "The elders, the fathers, and the men of wealth come on horseback to view the contests of their juniors, and in their fashion sport with the young men; and there seems to be aroused in these elders a stirring of natural heat by viewing so much activity and by participation in the joys of unrestrained youth." Kicking ball games are described in England from 1280.

In 1314, Edward II, then the King of England, said about a sport of football and the use of footballs, "certain tumults arising from great footballs in the fields of the public, from which many evils may arise." An account of an exclusively kicking "football" game from Nottinghamshire in the fifteenth century bears similarity to association football. By the 16th centuries, references to organised teams and goals had appeared. There is evidence for refereed, team football games being played in English schools since at least 1581. The eighteenth-century Gymnastic Society of London is, arguably, the world's first football club.

=== 19th century developments ===
The 19th century saw the codification of the rules of football at several public schools, with those of Rugby School (first published 1845) and Eton College (first published 1847) being particularly influential, in addition to those of Harrow, Winchester and Shrewsbury. The need for alumni of different public schools to be able to play against each other resulted in several sets of "compromise laws", often known as Cambridge rules, being drawn up at the University of Cambridge between the 1830s and the 1860s.

In the second half of the century, a culture of independent "football clubs" began to thrive. It was through the spread of football in elite social groups that allowed the growth of such clubs. It was common for sons descendant of elite locals to return to their home from school and form their own clubs.

Sheffield Football Club, founded in 1857, is recognised today as the world's oldest surviving independent football club. It published its first set of laws in 1859 which soon led to a proliferation of clubs in and around the city playing "Sheffield rules". Sheffield hosted the world's first multi-team football tournament, the Youdan Cup, in 1867.

In general, each football club, school or university tended to have its own rules, which might differ on such fundamental questions as whether to follow the example of Rugby School by allowing the ball to be carried, with players carrying the ball being allowed to be "hacked" (kicked in the shins) by their opponents. The desire of football clubs for a common code was the impetus behind the foundation of the Football Association (FA) in 1863.

Within the nascent FA, there was an acrimonious debate between the "hacking" and "non-hacking" clubs. When the first meetings were held to discuss the FA's laws of football, the "hackers" were in the ascendancy, but the publication of the 1863 set of Cambridge rules (which forbade hacking) enabled the "non-hackers" to prevail and the FA's first Laws of the Game, published in December 1863, banned hacking and carrying the ball. The FA, initially dominated by London-based clubs, saw its influence gradually spread over the country through the success of the FA Cup, first contested in the 1871–72 season.

But it should also be noted that most of the clubs that preferred “hacking” and “carrying” the ball, such as Blackheath Football Club, carried on playing their rugby-type game and they went on to form their own official association in England, the Rugby Football Union, in January 1871. This was followed by the adoption by the RFU of their own codified set of laws of the game of rugby in June 1871.

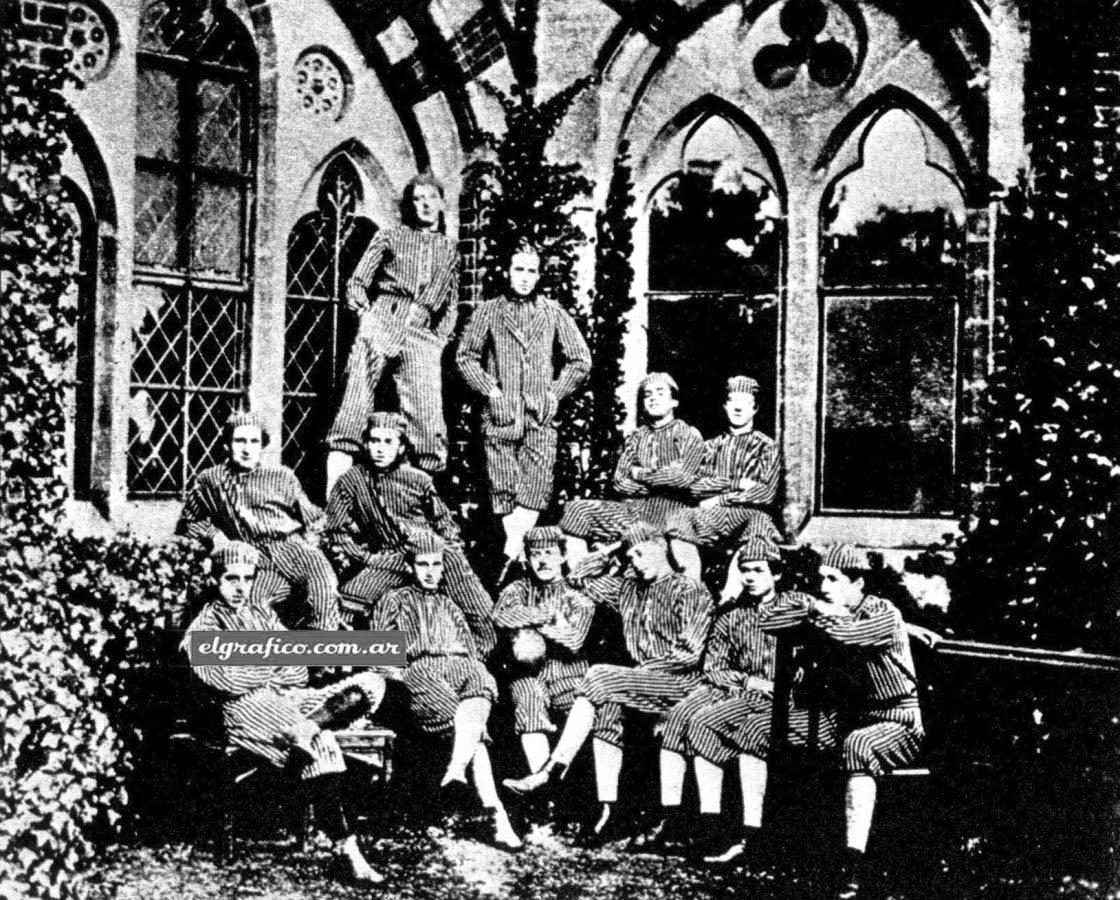
Harrow School team of 1867

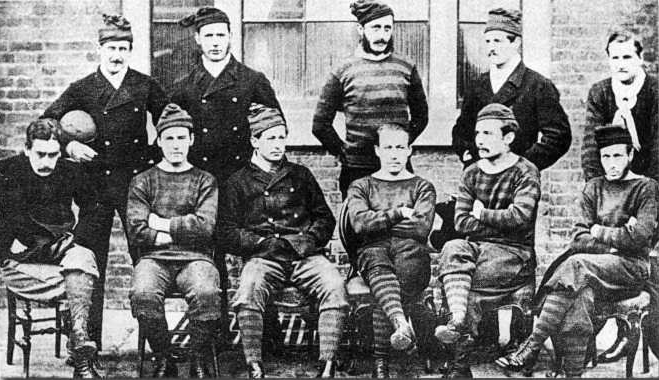
The Royal Engineers AFC (1872): the first passing side

Between 1863 and 1877, the FA and Sheffield rules co-existed, with each code at times influencing the other. Several games were played between Sheffield and London teams, using both sets of rules. After several disputes, the two codes were unified in 1877 when the Sheffield Football Association voted to adopt the FA laws, following the adoption of a compromise throw-in law by the FA. The Sheffield rules had a major influence on how the modern game of football developed. Among other things they introduced into the laws of the game are the concepts of corners, and free kicks for fouls.

International football began when teams representing England and Scotland met in a match at Kennington Oval in south London on 5 March 1870. A total of five games were played between the two teams to 21 February 1872, but they are not recognised as official internationals by FIFA because the Scottish players were all London-based and so not fully representative of Scotland as a nation.

The first official international, Scotland v England, was played on 30 November 1872 at Hamilton Crescent, the West of Scotland Cricket Club's ground in Partick, Glasgow. It was a 0–0 draw watched by 4,000 spectators. On 8 March 1873, England's 4–2 win over Scotland at Kennington Oval was the first-ever victory in international football.

The late nineteenth century was dominated by the growing split between the amateur and professional teams, which was roughly aligned along a North-South divide. Northern clubs were keen to adopt professionalism as workers could not afford to play on an amateur basis, while Southern clubs by the large part stuck by traditional "Corinthian" values of amateurism. Eventually, in 1885, the FA legalised professionalism, and when Aston Villa director William McGregor organised a meeting of representatives of England's leading clubs, this led to the formation of the Football League in 1888. Preston North End were inaugural winners in 1888–89 and were also the first club to complete the double of both winning the league and the FA Cup. Aston Villa repeated the feat in 1896–97.

In 1894, Charles Miller, a young elite son of a Scottish father and Brazilian mother, returned home to Brazil after his studies in Southampton with a new profound passion for football. Miller spread this passion of football to his fellow peers in a local athletic club and began to organise local football matches. More importantly, colleges that trained teachers encouraged educators to spread the passion for football and even to set up their own football clubs. This encouragement of educators to spread the enthusiasm for football aided in the global diffusion of the game. For example, William Leslie Poole, a teacher at the English High School in Montevideo, is acknowledged as the founder of the first football club and league in Uruguay.

=== Early 20th century: Expanding the league ===
The League expanded over the next 25 years as football boomed in England, from one division of twelve clubs in 1888, to two divisions by the 1892–93 season, with a total of 28 clubs and with the gradual addition of more clubs, a total of 40 by 1905–06. It remained at 40 until the league was suspended after the 1914–15 season with the outbreak of World War I. During this time clubs from the North and Midlands dominated, with Aston Villa, Sunderland, The Wednesday (later renamed Sheffield Wednesday) and Newcastle United all winning three or more league titles in the period leading up to World War I. Other clubs to win league titles in this period include Sheffield United, Manchester United and Everton. London-based clubs enjoyed little success during the late 19th and early 20th centuries, with the first major trophy being won by a London-based club being Tottenham Hotspur's FA Cup triumph in 1901, when they were still a Southern Football League club, although they were elected to the Football League soon after.

During the war, competitive football was suspended. However, an unofficial "Wartime Football league" was played from 1915–16 to 1918–19, although the FA Cup was suspended until after the war.

In the 1920–21 season the Football League was expanded, with the new Third Division, which expanded the league south of Birmingham, which until then had been sparsely represented in the Football League. Each division had 22 clubs. The next season the league was again expanded with the Third Division divided into North (with 20 clubs) and South (with 22 clubs) sections, making a total of 86 clubs in the Football League. In the 1923–24 season the Third Division North was expanded to 22 clubs, making a total of 88 league clubs.

After half a century of cup finals and internationals being hosted at various venues across England, the national stadium at Wembley was opened in 1923, with the "White Horse Final" being the first FA Cup final to be played there. Bolton Wanderers defeated West Ham United to win this landmark game. Bolton Wanderers would win the FA Cup on three occasions during the 1920s.

The inter-war years were dominated by Huddersfield Town, Everton and Arsenal, who won eleven of the eighteen league titles contested between them, with Huddersfield and Arsenal each grabbing a three consecutive titles, and Arsenal taking five in total, as well as two FA Cups. Huddersfield, and then Arsenal, were managed by Herbert Chapman, who moved from Huddersfield to Arsenal after the Yorkshire club's second successive title, and died just before Arsenal won their third successive title.

By the turn of the 1930s, the national side regularly played against other national teams from outside the British Isles. However, the FA's resignation from FIFA in 1928 meant that England did not contest any of the first three World Cups. The 1939–40 season was abandoned in September 1939 following the outbreak of World War II. However, as with World War I, a special wartime league was played throughout the war years, with the FA Cup again suspended. Ten regional "mini-leagues" were initially established in 1939 as well as the Football League War Cup which ran six seasons from 1939 to 1945 with West Ham United, Preston North End, Wolverhampton Wanderers, Blackpool, and Bolton Wanderers winning the trophy while in 1943–44 Aston Villa and Charlton Athletic shared the trophy after drawing 1–1. Various leagues and cups, mostly on a regional basis, were organised throughout the war years for five seasons until the FA Cup resumed in 1945–46. The Football League returned the following season.

=== Late 20th century: World War II aftermath ===
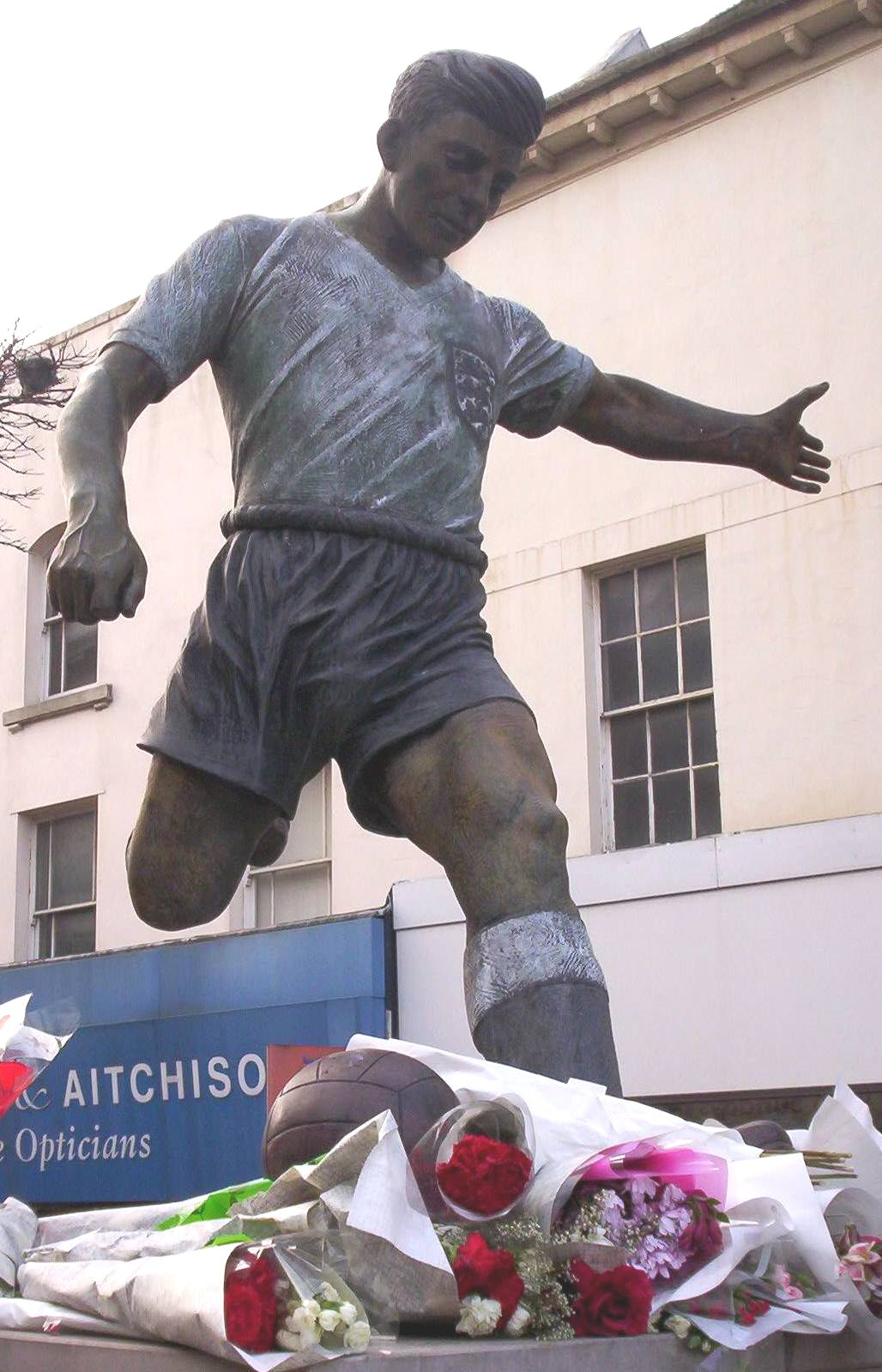
Duncan Edwards was a highly rated midfielder who was one of the eight Manchester United players who died as a result of the Munich air disaster in 1958.

The English national team suffered two shock defeats in the early 1950s: a 1–0 loss to the United States at the 1950 World Cup and a 6–3 defeat to Hungary at Wembley in 1953. However, Wolverhampton Wanderers defeated the Hungarian club Budapest Honvéd, a match which inspired the creation of the European Cup. Chelsea were dissuaded from participating in the first season of the European Cup in 1955–56, but Manchester United ignored such advice and went on to reach the semi-final of the 1956–57 edition, losing to the eventual winners Real Madrid. In the following season's European Cup, Manchester United were involved in the Munich air disaster: this also affected the national team as three of the players who died – Roger Byrne, Tommy Taylor and Duncan Edwards – were established England internationals. Their manager Matt Busby was seriously injured but survived; he had already taken United to FA Cup glory in 1948 and another league title triumph in 1952 with an earlier side which featured the likes of Johnny Carey, Jack Rowley and Stan Pearson.

Two English teams, a London XI and Birmingham City, both lost to Barcelona in the first two finals of the Inter-Cities Fairs Cup in 1958 and 1960.

Wolverhampton Wanderers were another highly successful English club side during the postwar years. Under the management of Stan Cullis, they were league champions three times and FA Cup winners twice between 1949 and 1960. Although they failed to make a major impact in either of their European Cup campaigns, they did beat some of European football's most respected club sides in a series of friendlies at Molineux Stadium during the 1950s. Arsenal continued their run of success for several years after the resumption of league football, winning two league titles and an FA Cup between 1948 and 1953. Their North London rivals Tottenham Hotspur won the league title for the first time in 1951, and by the end of the decade were challenging for honors once again under new manager Bill Nicholson and captain Danny Blanchflower. Another London club, Chelsea, won the league title in 1955. Newcastle United were FA Cup winners three times in the 1950s, while Portsmouth won back-to-back league titles in the early postwar years.

The Football League was reorganised for the 1958–59 season with Third Divisions North and South discontinued. The top half of each regional Third Division from the previous season formed a new Third Division, while the lower halves formed the new Fourth Division. Modernisation followed in the 1960s, with revolutions in the game such as the George Eastham case allowing players greater freedom of movement, and the abolition of the maximum wage in 1961.

Tottenham Hotspur became the first club to win the Double in the 20th century in 1960–61, retained the FA Cup the following season, and then became the first English club to win a European trophy, the Cup Winners' Cup in 1962–63 when they beat Atlético Madrid 5–1 in the final. Manager Bill Nicholson then built another successful Tottenham side which lifted a further FA Cup in 1967.

The most marked success of the era, however, was Alf Ramsey's England team, which won the 1966 FIFA World Cup on home soil after controversially beating West Germany 4–2 after extra time, the only time the national team has won the trophy.

In the late 1960s, English clubs dominated the last years of the Inter-Cities Fairs Cup, with wins for Leeds United, Newcastle United and Arsenal. Manchester United became the first English club to win the European Cup in 1967–68 when they beat Benfica 4–1 at Wembley in the final. Liverpool (four), Nottingham Forest (two), and Aston Villa (one) won the European Cup in a successful period between 1977 and 1984.

The first half of the 1960s saw the promotion of two sides to the First Division who would achieve great success as this level for many years afterwards: Liverpool (in 1962) and Leeds United (in 1964). Liverpool, managed by Bill Shankly, won the league title in 1964, two seasons after promotion, and followed this up with their first-ever FA Cup triumph a year later and a further league title in 1966. Among their players was Roger Hunt, who played in attack for England's World Cup winning side of 1966. Leeds United had appointed Don Revie, an FA Cup winner for Manchester City as a player in 1956, as their new manager in 1961, and he guided them to promotion in 1964. A year after promotion, they only missed out on the league title on goal average, finally winning it in 1969, by which time they had already won the Football League Cup and Inter-Cities Fairs Cup.

Manchester United also faced competition from their local rivals Manchester City, who overcame a dismal first half of the decade (which included three seasons in the Second Division) to pip United to the league title in 1968, win the FA Cup in 1969 and claim their first piece of European silverware in 1970 when they lifted the European Cup Winners' Cup.

West Ham United also played a major role in English football in the 1960s. They won their first silverware in 1964 when they won the FA Cup, and went on to win the European Cup Winners' Cup a year later. In 1966, they provided three key players in England's World Cup winning side – goalscorers Geoff Hurst and Martin Peters as well as captain Bobby Moore.

Liverpool enjoyed even more success during the 1970s. They won a further league title, FA Cup and the UEFA Cup before the retirement of Bill Shankly as manager in 1974. His successor Bob Paisley took Liverpool to even greater heights; by the end of the decade, he had guided them to three league titles, another UEFA Cup triumph, and the club's first two European Cups. Liverpool's local rivals Everton, who had been league champions in 1963 and FA Cup winners in 1966, began the 1970s by winning another league titles, but failed to add any silverware to their list of honors for the rest of the decade, although they did hold onto their place in the First Division. Arsenal started the 1970s on a winning note by lifting the penultimate Inter-Cities Fairs Cup, and then became the second team of the 20th century to win the double when they clinched the league title and FA Cup in 1971. Their next major trophy came in 1979, when they fought off a late revival from Manchester United at Wembley to win the FA Cup final 3–2.

Leeds United added a further league title and Inter-Cities Fairs Cup, as well as their first FA Cup, before Don Revie departed to take over as manager of the England national football team in the summer of 1974, after the Football Association terminated Sir Alf Ramsey's contract after 11 years, following England's failure to qualify for the World Cup.

Although Leeds United were still in the First Division at the decade's end, they failed to win any trophies after Revie left the club. The England team, meanwhile, continued to struggle, failing to qualify for the 1978 World Cup, with Revie defecting to coach the United Arab Emirates side just before this latest disappointment. Things began to turn around under his successor Ron Greenwood, who ended the decade by securing England's qualification for the 1980 European Championships, the first major tournament England had qualified for in 10 years.

Derby County, promoted to the First Division in 1969 after a lengthy absence, emerged as a force during the 1970s, winning the league title in 1972 under the controversial but effective management of Brian Clough, and again in 1975 under Clough's successor Dave Mackay. Clough, after a disastrous 44-day spell as Don Revie's successor at Leeds United, enjoyed even greater success at Nottingham Forest, taking the East Midlands club to promotion in 1977, the league title and League Cup in 1978 and to a further League Cup and the European Cup in 1979, before retaining their European crown in 1980. During this run of outstanding success, Clough also shelled out British football's first £1million transfer fee for the Birmingham City forward Trevor Francis, who signed for Forest in February 1979. Also among his acquisitions was the goalkeeper Peter Shilton, who went on to win a record of 125 full caps for England.

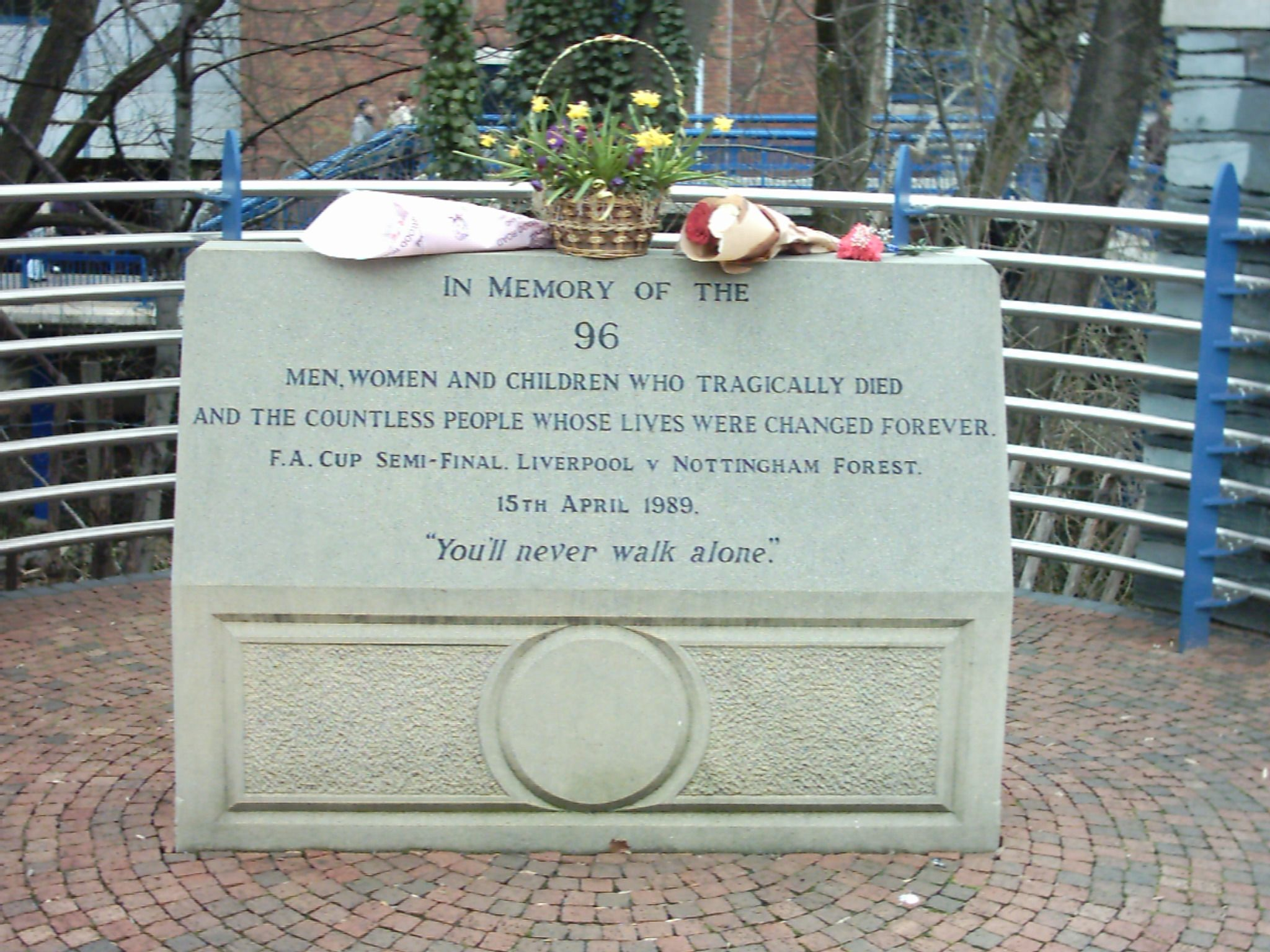
Memorial to the 1989 Hillsborough disaster at the stadium. The disaster resulted in a modernisation of English stadiums.

The rise of football hooliganism marred the game throughout the 1970s and 1980s, which contributed to a decline in match attendance. Other factors in falling attendances were the dismal economic conditions and rising unemployment, which plagued the British economy for most of the 1970s and into the 1980s, with many clubs in the north of England being hit particularly hard.

Many of English football's most famous and successful clubs reached low ebbs during the 1970s and 1980s, in many cases at least partly due to financial problems. Preston North End and Blackpool both fell into the Fourth Division and had to apply for re-election to the Football League between 1982 and 1986. Wolverhampton Wanderers found themselves on the verge of closure twice during the 1980s and suffered three successive relegations, which pushed them into the Fourth Division in 1986. Their local rivals Birmingham City dropped into the Third Division for the first time in 1989. Sunderland suffered the same fate as Birmingham two years previously, but achieved promotion at the first attempt and were soon challenging for a return to the First Division, while Wolves ended the decade back in the Second Division after two successive promotions. Bolton Wanderers, four times FA Cup winners, were relegated to the Fourth Division in 1987, but were promoted at the first time of asking.

In August 1974, a Blackpool fan was stabbed to death at the back of the Spion Kop, Bloomfield Road at Blackpool's home match with Bolton Wanderers. It was widely reported as being the first hooligan death at an English football match, and other clubs who gained notorious reputations for hooliganism during the 1970s and 1980s included Chelsea, Millwall, West Ham United, and Leeds United. The nadir came in May 1985, when Liverpool fans' hooliganism, combined with poor policing and infrastructure, led to the deaths of 39 Juventus fans before the European Cup final, in the Heysel Stadium disaster. The sequel to the tragedy was a ban on English clubs in European competitions, which was not lifted for five years. Due to the ban, many English star players transferred to continental clubs. England's ageing and poorly built stadiums were responsible for two disasters, at Bradford in May 1985 (just before the Heysel tragedy) and Hillsborough in April 1989, resulting in the deaths of 56 and 97 people respectively.

In 1986–87, automatic promotion and relegation between the Football League and non-league was introduced, with the bottom club in the league being relegated to the Conference. The first club to suffer automatic relegation from the Football League was Lincoln City, who were replaced by the GM Vauxhall Conference champions Scarborough, only to regain their league status a year later. That first relegation place in 1987 had very nearly been occupied by Burnley, league champions 27 years earlier and First Division members until just over a decade earlier, but victory in their final league game of the season secured their league survival.

Another major change that took place in English football during the second half of the 1980s was a restructuring of the divisions. During the 1986 close season, the Football League decided to reduce the First Division to 21 clubs for the 1987–88 season and finally to 20 clubs for the 1988–89 season, while the Second Division would be increased to 23 and finally to 24 clubs in the process. End-of-season promotion/relegation playoffs were introduced for these two transitional seasons, before the playoffs were established as promotion-only deciders from the end of the 1988–89 season onward, with the previously two-legged final being altered to a single match at Wembley from 1990 onward.

The 1970s saw the FA Cup won twice by Second Division clubs, the first time in the postwar era that the trophy had been won by a club outside the First Division. First, Sunderland lifted the trophy in 1973 at the expense of Leeds United. Three years later, Southampton defeated Manchester United to claim the first silverware of their history. In 1980, the trophy was won by a Second Division club for the third time in eight seasons when West Ham United triumphed over holders Arsenal.

The 1980s saw five different clubs reach the First Division for the first time. In 1981, Swansea City reached the First Division after climbing from the Fourth Division in just four seasons – the fastest rise of any club throughout the league at the time. They topped the First Division more than once during the 1981–82 season before finishing sixth. However, Swansea's successive story was short-lived, and their second season among the elite ended in relegation, and by 1986, they were back in the Fourth Division, having narrowly avoided going out of business. In 1982, Watford reached the First Division under the chairmanship of Elton John, management of Graham Taylor, and with the scoring prowess of Luther Blissett and John Barnes in attack. They finished runners-up in the league in their first top division season and were FA Cup runners-up in their second, and survived in the First Division until 1988. Taylor later managed the England team, while Barnes went on to help Liverpool win five major trophies and was a regular member of the England side for the second half of the 1980s and into the 1990s. 1985 saw the promotion of Oxford United to the First Division, 23 years after being elected to the Football League. They survived for three seasons in the First Division and won the League Cup in their first season among the elite. An even bigger success story emerged soon after Oxford's First Division arrival, when Wimbledon won promotion to the First Division in 1986, a mere nine years after being elected to the Football League. They quickly established themselves in the First Division, finishing sixth in their first season at this level, and even more impressively won the FA Cup a year later, beating league champions Liverpool 1–0 in the Wembley final. Wimbledon would enjoy the longest stay in the top flight of any of the First Division's new arrivals of the 1980s, retaining their tenancy at this level for 14 years. 1988 saw Millwall reach the First Division for the first time. Tipped by many to go straight back down, they actually topped the First Division briefly in its early stages before finishing 10th – the lowest position they occupied all season. They briefly went top of the league again during the second month of the following season, but finished the season relegated after just two seasons in the First Division.

Eventually, promotion and relegation between the Conference and the Football League was increased to two clubs in 2002–03. In the 1980s, play-offs were introduced throughout the Football League for promotion each season, with one club each season being promoted via the end-of-season play-offs in addition to those clubs promoted automatically.

Liverpool remained the most successful club side in England during the 1980s, winning the league title six times and the FA Cup twice (including the double in 1986). They also won four successive League Cups, and before the Heysel disaster they won the European Cup in 1981 and again in 1984, bringing their total number of victories in European football's biggest competition to four.

Everton also enjoyed a resurgence in the 1980s. Following the appointment of Howard Kendall as manager in 1981 and the signing of inspirational striker Andy Gray in November 1983, Everton won the FA Cup in 1984 and enjoyed even more success a year later, when they lifted the league title and their first European trophy – the European Cup Winners' Cup. Although they failed to win any trophies in 1986, they did finish runners-up to Liverpool in the league and reached the FA Cup final, where they lost 3–1 to their close neighbours, in a season where Gray's successor in attack, Gary Lineker, found the net more than 40 times in all competitions. Despite the sale of Lineker to Barcelona in the summer of 1986, Everton retained their league title the following season.

Manchester United endured a difficult time in the 1970s following the retirement of Matt Busby as manager. They suffered relegation to the Second Division in 1974, but achieved instant promotion and went on to win the FA Cup in 1977. The 1980s brought more success for the club, who won the FA Cup in 1983 and again in 1985 under the management of Ron Atkinson. They were captained by Bryan Robson, who also captained the England team for much of the decade, and had been Britain's most expensive footballer on his £1.5million arrival at the club in October 1981. Atkinson was succeeded by Alex Ferguson as manager in November 1986, but by the end of the decade, United had gone more than 20 years without winning the league title, although they had finished in the top four on no less than seven times during the decade.

Tottenham Hotspur also enjoyed success during the 1970s and 1980s. They won the League Cup twice during the early 1970s as well as the inaugural UEFA Cup in 1972, but suffered relegation to the Second Division in 1977. They achieved instant promotion under recently appointed manager Keith Burkinshaw, who then guided Spurs to back-to-back FA Cups and then another UEFA Cup triumph before stepping down as manager in 1984. Their North London rivals Arsenal won the League Cup in 1987 and ended their 18-year wait for the league title in 1989, when they beat Liverpool at Anfield in the final minute of the last game of the season to clinch the championship trophy on goals scored.

The summer of 1988 saw the first £2million+ transfer fees paid by British clubs. Tottenham Hotspur signed 21-year-old PFA Young Player of the Year Paul Gascoigne from Newcastle United, before Everton swooped for high-scoring forward Tony Cottee from West Ham United. After spending an unsuccessful season in Italy with Juventus, Ian Rush headed back to Liverpool for a second spell with the club he had scored more than 200 goals from during his first spell there.

The England team made considerable progress during the 1980s after the barren performances of the previous decade, qualifying for every major tournament between 1980 and 1990, with the exception of the 1984 European Championships, although their best run in any of these competitions was a quarter-final appearance at the 1986 World Cup.

The post-Hillsborough Taylor Report forced the conversion of major to all-seater, which was a requirement at all clubs in the top divisions by the 1994–95 season. At the same time, the money from television coverage was increasing rapidly, due to England reaching the semi-finals of the 1990 World Cup and a concerted effort to drive out hooliganism reinvigorated the national game. The ban on English clubs in European competitions was lifted in July 1990, although Liverpool still had to serve an additional year, and it would be a further five years before all of the English places in European competitions were restored.

Manchester United marked a winning return for English clubs in European competitions by winning the European Cup Winners' Cup in 1991, having lifted the FA Cup a year earlier. Enjoying a run of success under Alex Ferguson, they clinched the League Cup in the 1991–92 season, although a shortage of goals in the second half of that season did cost them the league title, which was instead won by a resurgent Leeds United. Liverpool also enjoyed a good start to the 1990s, winning their 18th league title in 1990, but were then stunned by the resignation of Kenny Dalglish as manager in February 1991. His successor Graeme Souness, who had enjoyed great success with the club as a player a decade earlier, guided the Reds to FA Cup glory in 1992.

Arsenal, the 1989 champions of the English First Division, won another league title in 1991, losing just once all season. The FA Cup also headed to North London that year, although it was won by Tottenham Hotspur, who lifted the trophy for a record eighth time.

In the last season of the English Football League being the highest division, Leeds United won their first league title ever since 1974.

=== 1992–present: Premier League era ===
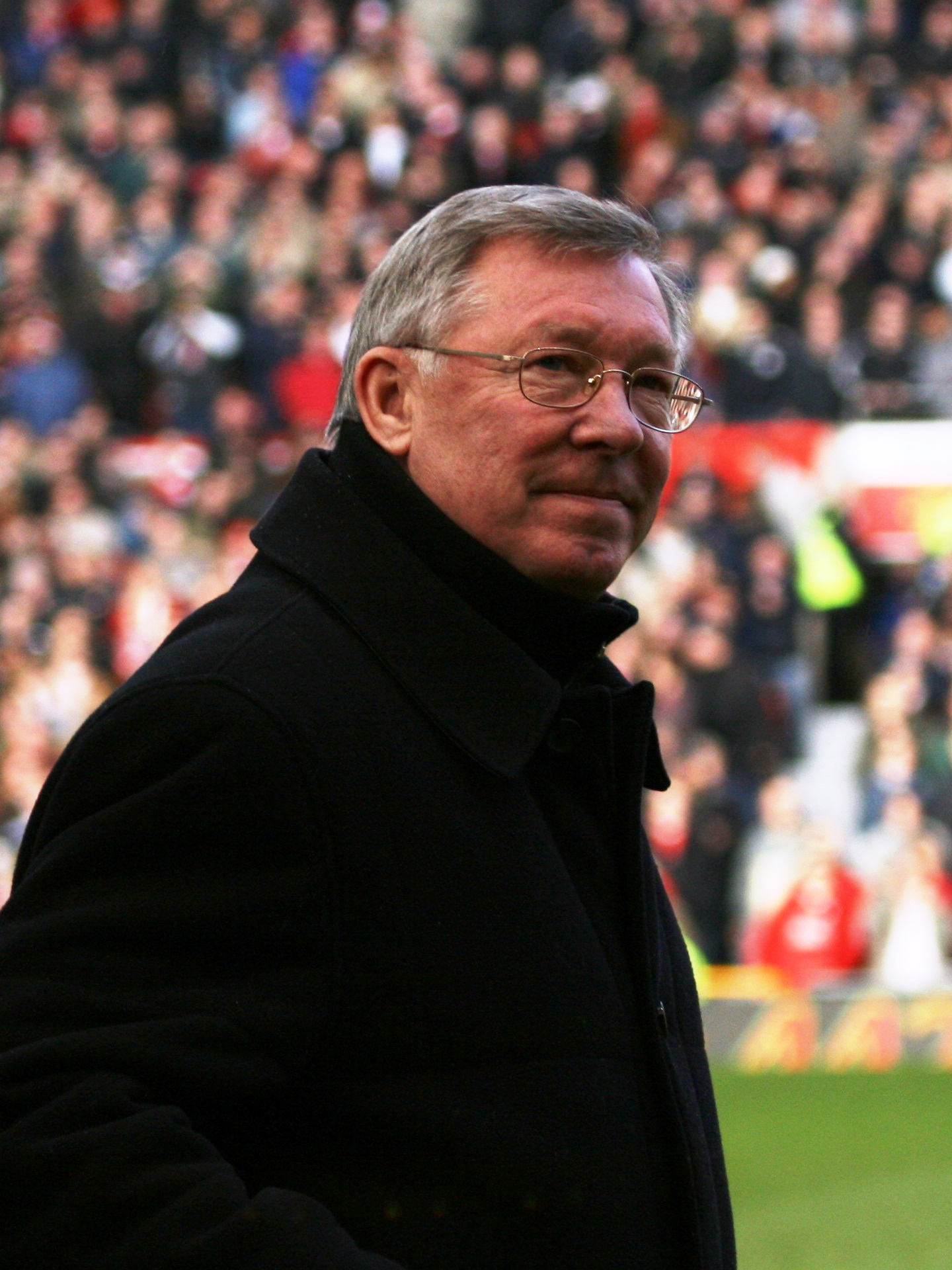
Under Scottish manager Alex Ferguson, Manchester United were the dominant team in the first 20 years of the Premier League

In the 1991–92 season, following two years of widespread speculation about the leading clubs of English football forming a breakaway league from the Football League, the 22 clubs competing in the First Division resigned en masse from the Football League, forming a new top-level competition, The FA Premier League, overseen by the FA, largely to capitalise upon their status as the biggest and most wealthy clubs in the country, and negotiate more profitable television rights. The new league came into force for the 1992–93 season. The Football League was consequently reorganised, with the Second, Third and Fourth Divisions renamed as the First, Second and Third Divisions respectively. Thus, the First Division, while still the top level of the Football League, became the second level of the entire English football league system with the top clubs inheriting the promotion play-off system from the old Second Division. The Premier League was reduced to 20 teams after the 1994–95 season.

The Premier League has been won by seven clubs in its 30 seasons, with Manchester United winning on 13 occasions. They have set many precedents in the process, becoming the first team to win a second double of the league title and FA Cup in 1996 (their first double being won in 1994), and in 1999 they won a unique treble of the league title, FA Cup and European Cup. English clubs have also won European tournaments since being permitted to compete after the Heysel disaster, the first English team to win the UEFA Champions League being Manchester United in 1999. The 2008 final, for the first time, was played between two English teams, Manchester United and Chelsea. Manchester United won the final in Moscow on penalties after a 1–1 draw.

The early Premier League years saw the transfer record fee in English football broken many times in a relatively short period of time, and rise at a rate barely comparable with even that of the late 1970s. The biggest fee paid by an English club during the Football League era was the £2.9million paid by Liverpool for Dean Saunders in July 1991. The national record was broken the following summer when Blackburn Rovers paid £3.3million for Alan Shearer. The national record was broken again in June 1993 when Manchester United signed Roy Keane for £3.75million. Blackburn then broke the national record in the 1994 close season by signing 21-year-old Norwich City striker Chris Sutton for £5million. In 1995, the record fee was broken three times in the space of six months. At the turn of the year, Andy Cole arrived at Manchester United in a deal worth £7million. After the season's end, Arsenal paid £7.5million to Inter Milan for Dutch forward Dennis Bergkamp, but Bergkamp had just spent days with his new club when Liverpool paid £8.5million for Nottingham Forest striker Stan Collymore. A year later, Alan Shearer became the most expensive player not only in England but in the world when he left Blackburn Rovers to sign for Newcastle United in a £15million deal. This fee, however, remained unsurpassed for more than four years. Premier League clubs have been increasingly successful at attracting foreign players, particularly since the removal of the limit on fielding players from common market countries in the mid-1990s.

The first decade of the premier league was dominated by Manchester United, who won the championship in 1993, 1994, 1996, 1997, 1999, 2000 and 2001, and then won again in 2003 and in 1999 completed a continental treble. After a hiatus during which United manager Alex Ferguson rebuilt his squad, United went on to win further titles in 2007, 2008, 2009, 2011 and 2013. The first team to interrupt Manchester United’s early dominance were Blackburn Rovers, who won the title by a single point in 1995. They had only returned to the top flight of English football in 1992, in time for the new league's formation, after a 26-year exile, bankrolled by the wealth of steel baron owner Jack Walker, who had enabled Blackburn to compete for some of the best players in English football; however, following their title success, their performances declined. Under Arsène Wenger, Arsenal have so far been Premier League champions three times: in 1998, 2002 and 2004. On the first two occasions, they completed the double of the league title and FA Cup, while on the third occasion, they won the title without losing a single league game all season. Chelsea made history in 1997 when they won the FA Cup under Dutch manager Ruud Gullit, the first foreign manager to win a major trophy in English football. They won the European Cup Winners' Cup and League Cup a year later under Gullit's successor Gianluca Vialli, who added a further FA Cup in 2000. Chelsea's biggest successes, however, have come since the arrival of new Russian owner Roman Abramovich in June 2003 and the appointment of Portuguese coach José Mourinho as manager 12 months later. Mourinho was in charge for more than three years until his sudden departure from the club in September 2007, before returning for a second spell as manager six years later (which lasted two years before getting sacked in December 2015). In the interim, Chelsea were managed by seven different managers over the course of six seasons, but continued to win trophies on a regular basis. Since Abramovich's takeover of Chelsea, the West London club has been Premier League champions five times, FA Cup winners four times, and League Cup winners three times, and has also won the European Cup and the Europa League (formerly the UEFA Cup). Manchester City, bankrolled since August 2008 by wealthy Arab owners, ended their 35-year wait for a major trophy by winning the FA Cup in 2011, and then won their first league title in 44 years the following season, both under the management of Italian coach Roberto Mancini. His Chilean successor Manuel Pellegrini became the first non-European manager to win a major trophy in English football when he guided City to the Premier League title and the League Cup in 2014. Further titles followed under Spanish coach Pep Guardiola, along with further domestic trophies, including a domestic treble, and in 2023 the European Cup. After narrowly avoiding relegation the previous season, outsiders Leicester City won an unprecedented league title in 2016, having never previously won the top flight title. The winning squad was worth just one-tenth of that of Manchester City's. For much of the premier league era Liverpool struggled to recapture their form of the previous decades and did not win a league championship until 2020 though in the meantime they won other domestic trophies, the UEFA Cup and two further European Cups. Leeds United, the last champions of English football before the creation of the Premier League, played in the first 12 seasons of the Premier League, peaking at third place in 2000, before being relegated in 2004 in the midst of a serious financial crisis which was the direct result of heavy spending on players in the previous few seasons and a failure to net the extra revenue that successful challenges for domestic and European silverware would have brought them. They would not return to the Premier League until more than a decade later, guided by Marcelo Bielsa to champions of the 2020/2021 EFL championship season.

Since the creation of the Premier League, a number of England's leading clubs have relocated to new stadiums. After several smaller clubs adopted this approach rather than update their ageing homes in the late 1980s and early 1990s, newly promoted Middlesbrough became the first top flight club to relocate to a new stadium when they moved into the Riverside Stadium for the 1995–96 season, ending a 92-year residence of Ayresome Park. Two years later, Middlesbrough's north-east rivals Sunderland left their historic Roker Park home for the new 42,000-seat Stadium of Light (which has since been expanded to hold nearly 50,000 seated fans) on the banks of the River Wear. Also in 1997, Derby County, Stoke City and Bolton Wanderers all moved into new all-seater stadiums.

A number of clubs that initially chose to convert their existing homes into all-seater stadiums went on to relocate to new stadiums to gain a larger capacity from the turn of the 21st century, particularly those that had progressed throughout the league and attracted a higher demand for tickets since the early 1990s. Southampton relocated to St Mary's Stadium in 2001 after more than 100 years at The Dell, with their new 32,000-seat stadium holding more than twice as many fans as their previous home had during its final years, as an all-seater stadium. Leicester City relocated to the Walkers Stadium (now known as the King Power Stadium) in 2002 after 111 years at Filbert Street. Having originally decided to stay at Maine Road, which was redeveloped to hold 35,000 seated fans by 1995, Manchester City moved into the City of Manchester Stadium (built for the previous year's Commonwealth games) at the start of the 2003–04 season. Arsenal had converted Highbury into an all-seater stadium capable of holding just under 39,000 fans by 1993, but within five years the club's owners had decided that such a capacity was inadequate and, after local residents objected to any expansion of Highbury (parts of which were listed structures) and a bid to buy Wembley Stadium from the Football Association was rejected, decided to build a new stadium at nearby Ashburton Grove. Their new stadium, the Emirates Stadium, was completed in time for the 2006–07 season, holding more than 60,000 spectators. West Ham United moved from the Boleyn Ground into the ~60,000 capacity Olympic Stadium at the end of the 2015–16 season.

The beginning of the new century also saw the construction of a new national stadium at Wembley. The old Wembley Stadium had been converted to an all-seater format by 1989, but its capacity was reduced to 78,000 from its previous capacity of 100,000. By the mid-1990s, plans were afoot for the refurbishment or complete reconstruction of the stadium. The eventual plan was for the old stadium to be demolished and a completely new 90,000-seat stadium to be built in its place. The old stadium finally closed in October 2000, and it was anticipated that the new stadium would be completed in 2003, but a series of delays meant that demolition of the old stadium did not take place for two years after the last game was played, and the new Wembley was not opened until March 2007.

== Development of women's football ==
Women's football has been played in England since the late 19th century and became especially popular in the early 20th century, with some matches attracting very large crowds. In 1921, however, the Football Association banned women's matches from being played on grounds affiliated with FA clubs, stating that the game was "quite unsuitable for females". The ban remained in place for fifty years until it was lifted in 1971, after which the women's game gradually returned to formal competition under the FA.

The Football Association assumed direct responsibility for the England women's national team in 1993, helping accelerate the professional development of the women's game. This later contributed to the launch of the FA Women's Super League in 2011 and England winning UEFA Women's Euro 2022.

== Men's League system ==
The English Football League, established in 1888 as The Football League by Aston Villa director William McGregor and renamed "English Football League" in 2016, was the first professional football league in the world. Since its founding, however, many other leagues have been founded in England. Sunday leagues are played each weekend by clubs, and the study made by the FA sees to this. Over the years, there has been an increasing effort to link all these leagues together in a pyramidal structure, allowing promotion and relegation between different levels. The primary motivation for this drive is to maintain the possibility that any club in England may dream of one day rising to the very top, no matter what status they currently hold. In a study made by FIFA in 2006, there are around 40,000 clubs registered with the FA, which is 11,000 more than any other country, the closest being the Brazilian Football Confederation, who have 29,000 registered clubs. Even without taking relative population into account, England has more football clubs than any other country in the world.

Traditionally, men's league fixtures are played on Saturdays at 3pm, although more recently high-profile matches are played across weekend afternoons and evenings to allow television broadcasts. European fixtures are typically played on Tuesday, Wednesday and Thursday evenings.

=== Premier League ===
The Premier League was founded in 1992 after England's top clubs broke away from the Football League in a successful effort aimed at increasing their income at the expense of clubs in the lower divisions. Links with The Football League were maintained, and each season the bottom three clubs are relegated from the Premier League and replaced by the top three from the Championship. The Premier League is contested between 20 clubs each season. Each club in the Premier League in any given season owns one twentieth of a share in the league itself, meaning that they are all supposedly equal owners with equal rights and responsibilities. Some of the famous clubs in the premier league include Manchester United, Liverpool and Chelsea. The Premier League is widely considered to be the best league in the world.

=== English Football League ===
Although the oldest league in the world, the English Football League (EFL) now ranks second in the hierarchy of English football since the split of England's top clubs in 1992 to form the FA Premier League. The EFL has 72 member clubs evenly divided among three divisions, currently named the Championship, League One and League Two. Despite the organizational split, promotion and relegation of clubs still take place between the Premier League and the EFL.

=== National League ===
Clubs not playing within either the Premier League or the three levels of the English Football League are commonly stated to be playing "non-League football". This use of the term non-league can be confusing, as these lower-level clubs do indeed play within organized league structures, but these lower-level leagues are outside of the Premier and English Football Leagues; hence the term "non-league" football.

In recent years, the top few levels have been consolidated into the National League System, operated by the FA. Most clubs in the National League division are fully professional.

There is promotion and relegation between League Two and the National League, and for several levels below that, although this becomes more irregular further down the league system. The non-League system is often known as the "pyramid", because the number of leagues at each level begins to increase the further down through the levels, with each league covering a smaller geographic area.

=== Amateur ===
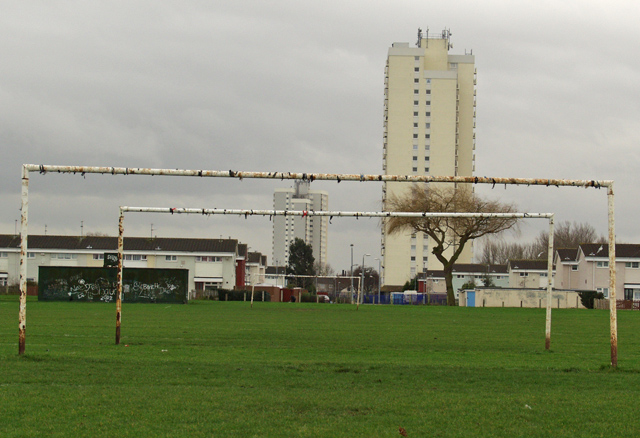
Many residential areas in England have public football pitches such as these on the Orchard Park Estate in Kingston upon Hull.

Although the FA abandoned a formal definition of "amateur" in the early 1970s, the vast majority of clubs still effectively play as amateurs, with no financial reward.

Regional

There are three leagues at a regional level: Northern Premier League, Isthmian League and Southern League. Each has a top and multiple, single-level, lower divisions.

County

A non-league match between Maine Road F.C. and 1874 Northwich of the North West Counties Football League, part of the ninth level of English football.

The various County Football Associations, which are based roughly on the historic county boundaries, are the local governing bodies of football in England. They govern all aspects of Sunday league football. Not all County Football Associations are run on a county basis. Each armed service has one, for instance, such as the Army Football Association which administers football within the British Army.

The Amateur Football Alliance (AFA) is the largest organized amateur competition, being particularly strong in the London area. The AFA is also a County Football Association and as such governs leagues such as the Arthurian League which contains two former FA Cup winners, Old Etonians who won the FA Cup twice, in 1879 and 1882 as well as Old Carthusians who were FA Cup winners in 1881.

=== Sunday League ===
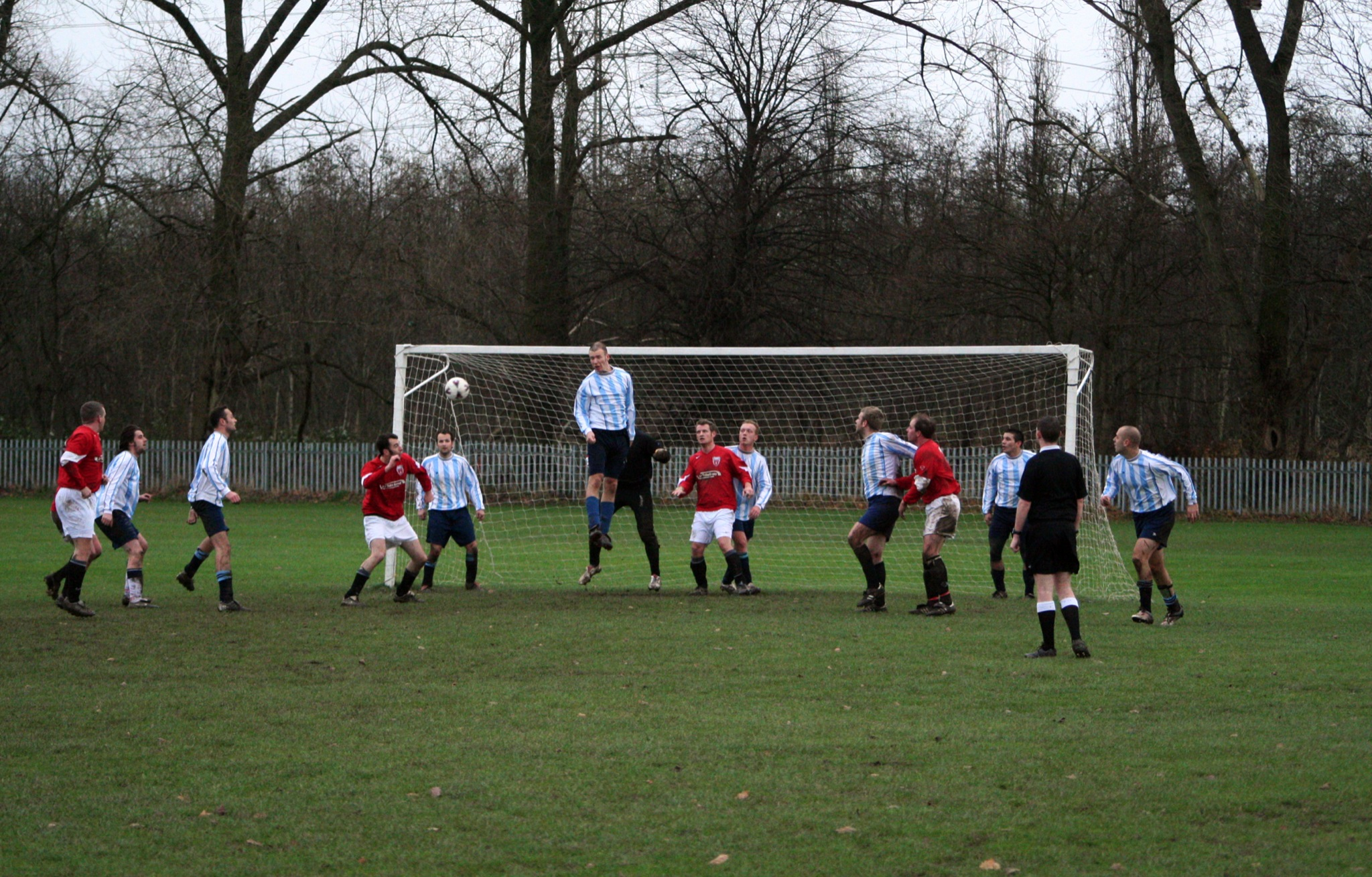
Sunday league football (a form of amateur football). Amateur matches often take place in public parks.

Sunday league football in England tends to be lower-level amateur football, which is also sometimes referred to as Pub League due to the number of public houses that field teams in Sunday leagues. Each local County Football Association governs all aspects of Sunday league football.

=== Scaled-down teams ===
Smaller-sided versions of the game such as Five-a-side football are popular. Futsal is also a growing sport in England. These are often played informally, but there are many competitive small-sided leagues running across the country.

=== Reserve leagues ===
The top division for reserve teams of professional clubs is the Premier Reserve League, which was founded in 1999 and is split into Premier Reserve League North and Premier Reserve League South, both with ten participating teams.

Beneath that operate the Central League for Football League clubs' reserve teams in the Midlands and North of England, and the Football Combination for clubs from the South of England and Wales.

The Central League was formed in 1911 and currently has 28 teams, split into three divisions – Central, North and South. The winners of each division and the best runner-up compete in the end-of-season play-offs to decide the league champions. Whilst the Central League is for Football League reserve teams, the West Division contains a Manchester City side which uses a mix of reserve team and youth team squad players, and in 2007–08 they were Central League champions. The Central League also organises the Central League Cup, although not all clubs enter the cup.

The Football Combination was formed in 1915 and currently has 30 teams. The Combination is also split into three divisions – East, Central and Wales & East. Whilst the majority of teams are Football League reserve teams, the Combination also currently has the reserve teams of two National League sides, Lewes, and Salisbury City. The Football Combination also organises the Combination Challenge Cup, although not all clubs enter the cup.

There is no promotion and relegation between the reserve team leagues. When a first team is relegated from the Premier League, their reserve team withdraws from the Premier Reserve League to either of the other two leagues and is replaced by the reserve team of the club promoted from the Championship.

Below the professional club reserve leagues, many clubs also operate reserve teams, which play in separate Reserve leagues, such as the Lancashire League. Some lower leagues, such as the North West Counties Football League, organised their own reserve leagues. And, at some lower levels of the pyramid, reserve teams play against first teams.

=== Youth leagues ===
Many club sides have youth teams. The top level of youth football is the Premier Academy League, founded in 1997, which is for all Premier League and Football League clubs that have Academy sides. The league, which currently has 40 clubs, is divided into four groups, each with ten teams. The winners of each group contest the end-of-season play-offs to decide the league champions.

The second-tier youth league is the Football League Youth Alliance, also founded in 1997, in which those Football League clubs that have Centres of Excellence status field their youth teams. The league, which currently has 58 clubs, is divided into four regional conference leagues. The Youth Alliance also operates the annual Youth Alliance Cup.

The FA Youth Cup is a nationwide cup competition for Under-18 teams organised by the FA. More than 400 clubs enter the FA Youth Cup each season.

== Men's Cup competitions ==
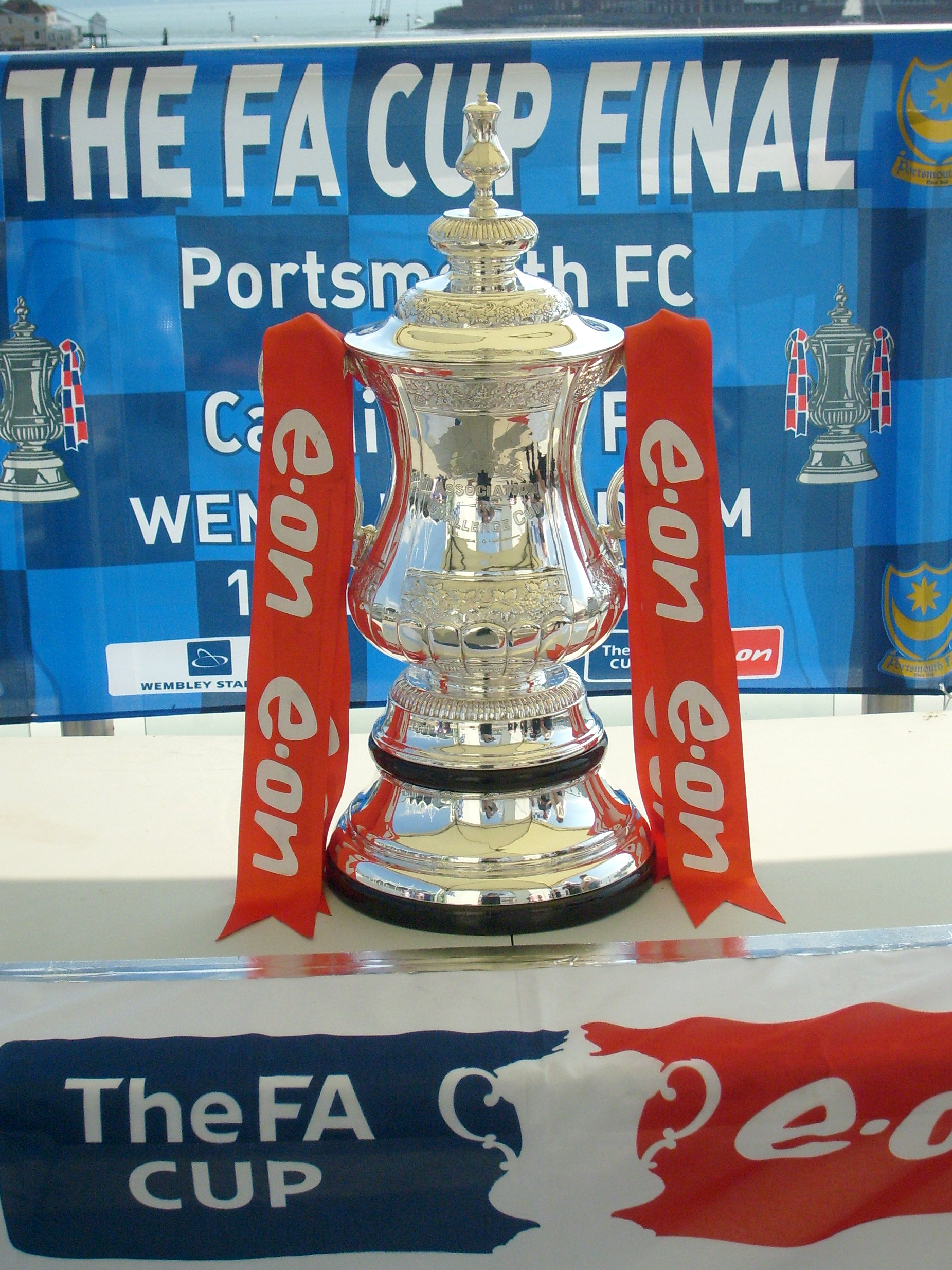
First staged in 1871–72, the FA Cup is the oldest football tournament in the world

There are several cup competitions for clubs at different levels of the football pyramid. The two major cup competitions are the FA Cup and the EFL Cup, with the winners of the FA Cup qualifying for the UEFA Europa League and the winners of the EFL Cup qualifying for the UEFA Conference League.

- The FA Cup, first held in 1871, is the oldest national cup competition in the world. It is open to around 600 clubs in levels 1–10 of the football pyramid.
- The FA Community Shield (formerly Charity Shield), first held in 1908, is a single match played each August between the FA Cup winners and the Premier League champions.
- The EFL Cup (currently known as the Carabao Cup), first held in 1960, is England's second major cup competition, and is contested by the 92 Premier League and EFL clubs.
- The EFL Trophy (currently known as the Vertu Trophy), first held in 1983, is a competition for the 48 clubs in Football League One and Football League Two, and 16 Premier League and Championship under-23 sides.
- The FA Trophy, first held in 1969, is for clubs playing in levels 5–8 of the football pyramid (steps 1–4 of the National League System), i.e. the twelve divisions of the National League, the Southern Football League, the Isthmian League and the Northern Premier League.
- The FA Vase, first held in 1974, is for clubs in levels 9–10 of the football pyramid (steps 5–6 of the National League System)
- The FA Inter-League Cup (NLS Cup) was formed in the 2003–04 to provide an English representative in the UEFA Regions' Cup. It is contested by representative sides from leagues at level 11 of the English football pyramid (level 7 of the National League System), which is roughly the county level, together with a few other leagues permitted by the FA. The first winner of the NLS Cup was the Mid Cheshire League, who beat the Cambridgeshire County League 2–0 in May 2004.
- A number of lower leagues organise their own cup competitions, such as the North West Counties Football League, who run a League Cup and a Division One Trophy.
- Many County Football Associations organise their own cup competitions involving Premier League and Football League clubs as well as non-league clubs in some counties. Most league clubs tend to use reserve or youth teams, whereas non-league clubs will use their first team. County cups include the Sheffield and Hallamshire Senior Cup, which is one of the oldest surviving cup competitions in the world, the Birmingham Senior Cup which began in 1875 with its first final in 1876 making it the oldest known surviving regional football cup competition in the world and which has featured all of the major West Midlands clubs over the years with Aston Villa winning a record number of times, the Lancashire Senior Cup which is competed for by Premier League and Football League clubs from the historic county of Lancashire, including Manchester United, Manchester City, Liverpool, Everton and Burnley, along with Blackburn Rovers, Wigan Athletic, Bolton Wanderers, Blackpool, Preston North End, Oldham Athletic, Rochdale, Bury and Morecambe. The Lancashire FA Challenge Trophy is for senior non-league clubs in the same county. Everton, Liverpool and Tranmere Rovers enter the Liverpool Senior Cup using their reserve or youth teams, along with local Merseyside non-league clubs, such as Burscough and Marine. Other competitions include the London Senior Cup and the Middlesex Senior Cup.
- The FA Sunday Cup began in 1964 and is a national knockout competition for all Sunday league teams. The 2008 final was played at Anfield.
- The AFA Senior Cup is an amateur football competition organised by the Amateur Football Alliance and contested by the first teams of clubs affiliated to the Alliance.
- Although not an FA-affiliated contest, the Masters Football contest is a contest between former players and is refereed by former Premier League Referees

There have also been a number of other cup competitions which are no longer run:

- FA Amateur Cup (1893–1974) was for all teams outside the Football League, which in theory, were amateur
- Sheriff of London Charity Shield (1898–1907, 1931–1934 and 1965–66) was an early predecessor to the Community Shield
- Anglo-Italian Cup (1970–1973, 1976–1986 and 1992–1996) also involved Italian clubs
- Anglo-Italian League Cup (1969–1971, 1975–1976) involving FA Cup or League Cup winners and the Coppa Italia winners
- Watney Cup (1970–1973) was an invitational tournament for select clubs across Football League divisions
- Texaco Cup (1971–1975) was an invitational tournament also involving teams from Scotland and all Ireland
- Anglo-Scottish Cup (1975–1981)
- Super Cup (1985)
- Full Members' Cup (1985–1992) was for clubs in levels 1–2 and ended with the Premier League separation.
- The Conference League Cup (1979–2009) was for clubs in level 5–6 i.e. the three divisions of the Football Conference.

=== Current national cup eligibility ===
Level	League(s)	FA Cup	EFL Cup	EFL Trophy	FA Trophy	FA Vase
1	Premier League	Yes	Yes	Academies	No	No
2	English Football League Championship	Yes	Yes	Academies	No	No
3	English Football League One	Yes	Yes	Yes	No	No
4	English Football League Two	Yes	Yes	Yes	No	No
5	National League Top Division	Yes	No	No	Yes	No
6	National League North / South	Yes	No	No	Yes	No
7	NPL / SFL/ IL Premier Division	Yes	No	No	Yes	No
8	NPL / SFL/ IL Division One	Yes	No	No	Yes	No
9	Various	Yes	No	No	No	Yes
10	Various	Yes	No	No	No	Yes
11	Various	No	No	No	No	Yes

== Most successful men's clubs ==
The most successful men's football club of all time is Liverpool with a total of 70 competitive honours, closely followed by Manchester United with 68 honours. The next two most successful are Arsenal and Manchester City.

In the all-time league table since 1888–89, Liverpool is once again the most successful club in terms of points achieved. This is followed by Arsenal, Everton, Manchester United, and Aston Villa.

== The popularity of Premier League clubs ==
Many successful Premier League clubs are also successful on social media with a large international fanbase. Six of the top 20 most popular football clubs on social media in the world, as of 28 September 2023, are from England:

#	Football club	Country	Followers
1	Real Madrid	Spain	415 million
2	FC Barcelona	Spain	391.7 million
3	Manchester United	England	224.5 million
4	Paris Saint-Germain	France	189.6 million
5	Manchester City	England	156.3 million
6	Chelsea	England	151.7 million
7	Juventus	Italy	147.1 million
8	Liverpool	England	136.9 million
9	Bayern Munich	Germany	130.7 million
10	Arsenal	England	104.1 million
11	Tottenham Hotspur	England	95.3 million
12	AC Milan	Italy	70.3 million
13	Inter Milan	Italy	64.1 million
14	Borussia Dortmund	Germany	57.1 million
15	Flamengo	Brazil	52.5 million
16	Atlético Madrid	Spain	50.9 million
17	Al-Ahly	Egypt	46.9 million
18	Galatasaray	Turkey	44.9 million
19	Al-Nassr	Saudi Arabia	43.8 million
20	AS Roma	Italy	35.1 million

== UEFA qualification ==
From the 2015–16 season, the various permutations allow for a maximum of five English clubs to qualify for the UEFA Champions League and five for the UEFA Europa League. From the 2018–19 season, the top four clubs in Europe's four highest ranked leagues qualify directly to the group stages. These leagues are currently England, Italy, Spain, Germany, and France. The minimum quota is for four English clubs to qualify for the UEFA Champions League and three for the UEFA Europa League. In the 2024/25 season, a new Champions League format was introduced which increased the number of teams to 36, and replaced the group stage with a Swiss format. This meant that the top two leagues in the UEFA coefficients received one extra Champions League spot each. This allowed Newcastle United to qualify to the 2025–26 UEFA Champions League, even though they finished fifth in the Premier League. This season also saw the most teams in the Champions League from a single league (6), due to Tottenham Hotspur also winning the Europa League.

Competition	Who qualifies	Notes
UEFA Champions League group stage	Club finishing 1st in the Premier League	
UEFA Champions League group stage	Club finishing 2nd in the Premier League	
UEFA Champions League group stage	Club finishing 3rd in the Premier League	
UEFA Champions League group stage	Club finishing 4th in the Premier League	
UEFA Champions League group stage	UEFA Champions League Winners	From the 2018–19 season, the UEFA Champions League Winners will gain entry to the UEFA Champions League in the group stages.
UEFA Champions League play-off round for non-champions	UEFA Europa League Winners	Prior to the 2015–16 season, there was a limit of four clubs from each association entering the Champions League. If a club outside of England's top four won the Champions League, the 4th placed club would be demoted to the Europa League in the following season. This occurred in the 2011–12 season when Chelsea won the Champions League but only finished sixth in the Premier League. They replaced Tottenham Hotspur in the Champions League, who were demoted to the Europa League as the final English representative in the Champions League. From the 2018–19 season, the UEFA Europa League winners will gain entry to the UEFA Champions League in the group stages. From the 2018–19 season, if English clubs win both the UEFA Champions League and UEFA Europa League, and neither finishes the Premier League in a position that qualifies them for the UEFA Champions League, the following will happen: The club that won the UEFA Champions League will go straight into the group stage; The UEFA Europa League winners will go into the UEFA Champions League group stage; The club that finished fourth in the Premier League will transfer into the UEFA Europa League
UEFA Europa League group stage	FA Cup winners	If the FA Cup winners qualify for the UEFA Champions League or the UEFA Europa League via the domestic championship, by Regulation 3.04, the highest ranking non-qualified league club qualifies, taking the lowest Europa League spot (the League Cup spot – the League Cup inherits the League spot, and the League inherits the FA Cup spot).
UEFA Europa League group stage	Club finishing fifth in the Premier League	If the fifth-placed club has already qualified for Europe through the FA Cup, then the next-highest Premier League finishers get this place
UEFA Conference League play-off round	League Cup winners	If the League Cup winners have already qualified for Europe by a high Premier League finish, then the next highest-finishing Premier League club gets this place

== National teams ==
The England national football team represents England in international football. It is one of the two oldest national football teams in the world, the other one being Scotland. England is one of only eight national teams to have won the World Cup and did this in 1966. They are one of the more prominent teams on the global stage, rarely dropping outside of the top ten rankings of both FIFA and Elo. They were the most successful of the Home Nations in the British Home Championship with 54 wins (including 20 shared wins) before the competition was suspended in 1984.

There are also a number of other national teams from the Under-16 team to the Under-21 team, the latter of which is considered to be a feeder team for the national team. In addition, there is an England B team which occasionally plays games as support for the national team. The England C team (formerly the England National Game XI and the England Semi-Professional team) represents England at the non-league level. They compete annually in the Four Nations Tournament as well as in friendly matches throughout the year.

== Women's football ==
The first recorded women's football match in England was more than 100 years ago. Women's football was very popular for many years, but it was stopped by a ban made by the Football Association from 1921 to 1962.

Women's football in England is organised into a pyramid system similar to the men's game. It has seven tiers, with the FA Women's Super League (FA WSL), launched in 2011, at the top.

== Stadiums ==
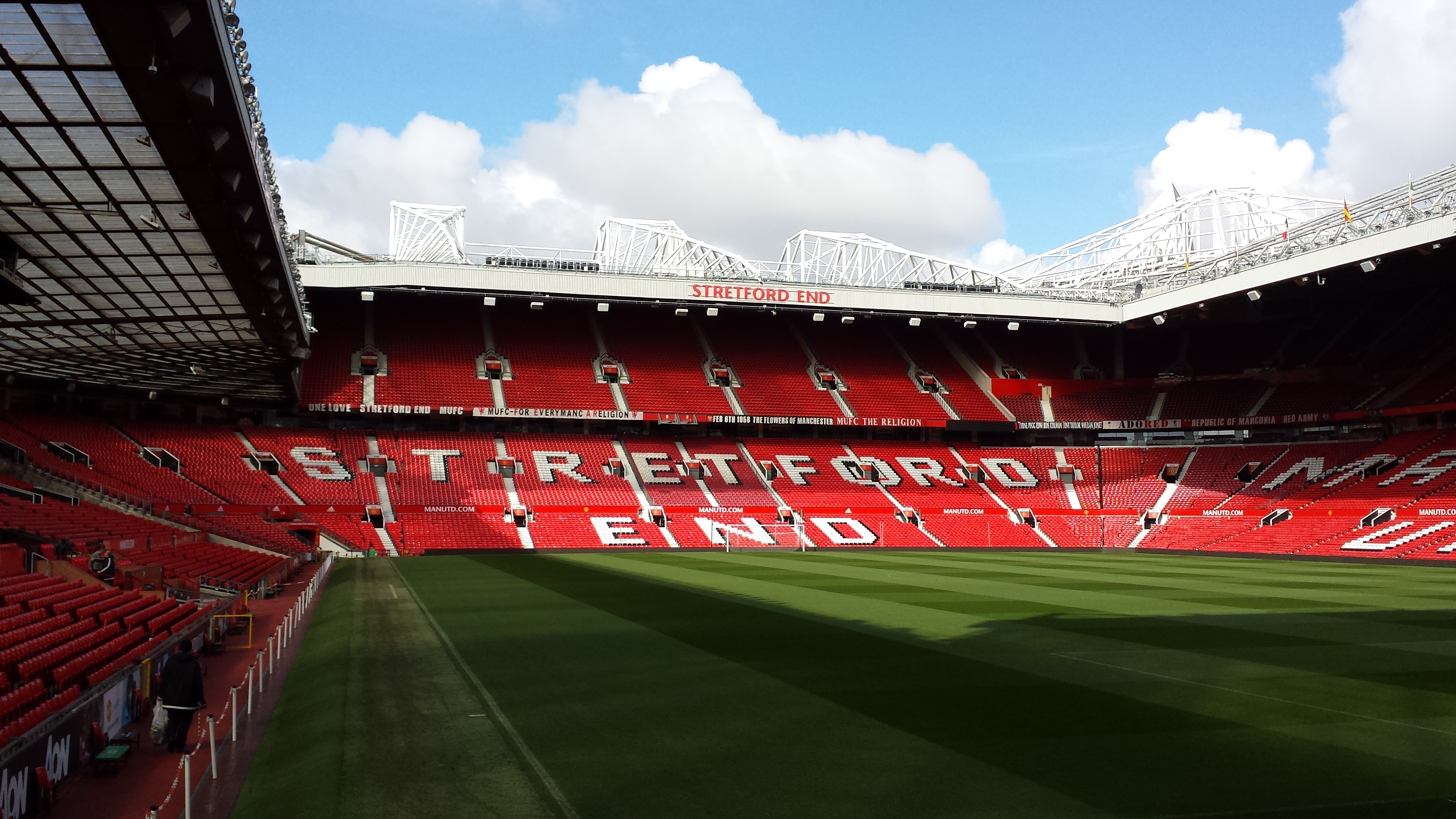
Old Trafford, the home of Manchester United, is the largest club ground by capacity in England.

=== Capacity ===
Wembley Stadium is the national stadium in England. It is also the largest stadium in the country with a capacity of 90,000. It is owned by the FA and stages England home matches, the FA Cup final and semi-finals, the English Football League Cup final, the English Football League Trophy, the FA Trophy, the FA Vase, as well as the Promotion play-off finals of the English Football League and the National League. Old Trafford with a capacity of 76,212 is the largest club stadium, with the Tottenham Hotspur Stadium holding 62,850 and London Stadium holding 62,500. All Premier League clubs play in all-seater stadiums. Most professional clubs have either moved to new purpose-built stadiums or redeveloped their stadium. Even at non-league level there have been big improvements with the likes of New Bucks Head the home of Telford United with a capacity of 6,300, being one of the best in non-league and Princes Park with a capacity of 4,100, the home of Dartford, one of the most ecologically sound ever built.

=== Ownership ===
Some clubs moved out of their old stadiums into newly developed council-built and owned stadiums, where they are tenants. Clubs include Doncaster Rovers at the Keepmoat Stadium, which is owned by Doncaster Council, and Hull City at the KC Stadium, which is owned by Hull City Council. Coventry City's home ground of the CBS Arena was a council-built stadium originally owned jointly by City Council and the Alan Edward Higgs Charity, but it has since been purchased by Coventry City in August 2025.

=== Visiting all league club stadiums ===
The 92 Club is a society, to be a member of which, a person must attend a football match at the stadium of every current Premier League and Football League club in England and Wales.

=== Largest English football stadiums by capacity ===
Overall Rank	Stadium	Location	Capacity	Built	Team	Notes
1	Wembley Stadium	London	90,000	2007	England national football team	Previously occupied by the older Wembley Stadium (1923).
2	Old Trafford	Manchester	74,310	1910	Manchester United	
3	Tottenham Hotspur Stadium	London	62,850	2019	Tottenham Hotspur	
4	London Stadium	London	62,500	2012	West Ham United	Previously known as the Olympic Stadium. Regulated capacity reduced from 66,000 to 62,500.
5	Anfield	Liverpool	61,276	1892	Liverpool	
6	Emirates Stadium	London	60,704	2006	Arsenal	Known as Arsenal Stadium for UEFA competitions
7	City of Manchester Stadium	Manchester	53,400	2003	Manchester City	Commercially known as the Etihad Stadium.
8	Everton Stadium	Liverpool	52,769	2025	Everton	Commercially known as the Hill Dickinson Stadium.

== Disasters ==
- Burnden Park disaster, 1946
- Munich air disaster, 1958
- Bradford City stadium fire, 1985
- Heysel Stadium disaster, 1985
- Hillsborough disaster, 1989

== Seasons ==
The following articles detail the major results and events in each season since 1871–72, when the first organised competition, the FA Cup, was created. Seasons in italics are wartime seasons, when official national competition was suspended, although regional football continued.

1870s:		1871–72	1872–73	1873–74	1874–75	1875–76	1876–77	1877–78	1878–79	1879–80
1880s:	1880–81	1881–82	1882–83	1883–84	1884–85	1885–86	1886–87	1887–88	1888–89	1889–90
1890s:	1890–91	1891–92	1892–93	1893–94	1894–95	1895–96	1896–97	1897–98	1898–99	1899–1900
1900s:	1900–01	1901–02	1902–03	1903–04	1904–05	1905–06	1906–07	1907–08	1908–09	1909–10
1910s:	1910–11	1911–12	1912–13	1913–14	1914–15	1915–16	1916–17	1917–18	1918–19	1919–20
1920s:	1920–21	1921–22	1922–23	1923–24	1924–25	1925–26	1926–27	1927–28	1928–29	1929–30
1930s:	1930–31	1931–32	1932–33	1933–34	1934–35	1935–36	1936–37	1937–38	1938–39	1939–40
1940s:	1940–41	1941–42	1942–43	1943–44	1944–45	1945–46	1946–47	1947–48	1948–49	1949–50
1950s:	1950–51	1951–52	1952–53	1953–54	1954–55	1955–56	1956–57	1957–58	1958–59	1959–60
1960s:	1960–61	1961–62	1962–63	1963–64	1964–65	1965–66	1966–67	1967–68	1968–69	1969–70
1970s:	1970–71	1971–72	1972–73	1973–74	1974–75	1975–76	1976–77	1977–78	1978–79	1979–80
1980s:	1980–81	1981–82	1982–83	1983–84	1984–85	1985–86	1986–87	1987–88	1988–89	1989–90
1990s:	1990–91	1991–92	1992–93	1993–94	1994–95	1995–96	1996–97	1997–98	1998–99	1999–2000
2000s:	2000–01	2001–02	2002–03	2003–04	2004–05	2005–06	2006–07	2007–08	2008–09	2009–10
2010s:	2010–11	2011–12	2012–13	2013–14	2014–15	2015–16	2016–17	2017–18	2018–19	2019–20
2020s:	2020–21	2021–22	2022–23	2023–24	2024–25	2025–26	2026–27			

== See also ==
- List of football stadiums in England
- List of English football champions
- Football in the United Kingdom
- English football league system
- Football refereeing in England
- English football on television
- Football records in England
- Timeline of English football
- Football in London

== Attendances ==
The average attendance per top-flight football league season and the club with the highest average attendance:

Season	League average	Best club	Best club average
2024–25	40,401	Manchester United	73,747
2023–24	38,562	Manchester United	73,534
2022–23	40,236	Manchester United	73,671
2021–22	39,600	Manchester United	73,150
2019–20	39,349	Manchester United	73,393
2018–19	38,181	Manchester United	74,498
2017–18	38,317	Manchester United	74,976
2016–17	35,822	Manchester United	75,290
2015–16	36,461	Manchester United	75,286
2014–15	36,176	Manchester United	75,335
2013–14	36,657	Manchester United	75,207
2012–13	35,921	Manchester United	75,530
2011–12	34,600	Manchester United	75,387
2010–11	35,283	Manchester United	75,109
2009–10	34,151	Manchester United	74,864
2008–09	35,596	Manchester United	75,304
2007–08	36,076	Manchester United	75,691
2006–07	34,363	Manchester United	75,826
2005–06	33,885	Manchester United	68,765
2004–05	33,893	Manchester United	67,748
2003–04	35,021	Manchester United	67,641
2002–03	35,464	Manchester United	67,602
2001–02	34,470	Manchester United	67,558
2000–01	32,906	Manchester United	67,490
1999–2000	30,757	Manchester United	58,014
1998–99	30,581	Manchester United	55,188
1997–98	29,190	Manchester United	55,168
1996–97	28,434	Manchester United	55,081
1995–96	27,550	Manchester United	41,700
1994–95	24,271	Manchester United	43,681
1993–94	23,040	Manchester United	44,244
1992–93	21,125	Liverpool FC	37,004
1991–92	21,622	Manchester United	44,984
1990–91	22,681	Manchester United	43,218
1989–90	20,757	Manchester United	39,077
1988–89	20,553	Liverpool FC	38,574
1987–88	19,273	Liverpool FC	39,582
1986–87	19,794	Manchester United	40,594
1985–86	19,569	Manchester United	46,321
1984–85	21,080	Manchester United	42,881
1983–84	18,834	Manchester United	42,534
1982–83	20,126	Manchester United	41,555
1981–82	22,556	Manchester United	44,571
1980–81	24,682	Manchester United	45,071
1979–80	26,327	Manchester United	51,608
1978–79	27,428	Manchester United	46,430
1977–78	28,692	Manchester United	51,860
1976–77	29,405	Manchester United	53,710
1975–76	28,333	Manchester United	54,750
1974–75	27,254	Liverpool FC	45,966
1973–74	28,296	Manchester United	42,712
1972–73	30,257	Manchester United	48,623
1971–72	31,313	Liverpool FC	47,687
1970–71	30,224	Liverpool FC	45,602
1969–70	32,113	Manchester United	49,862
1968–69	31,399	Manchester United	51,169
1967–68	33,029	Manchester United	57,552
1966–67	30,769	Manchester United	53,854
1965–66	26,903	Liverpool FC	46,344
1964–65	27,508	Manchester United	46,521
1963–64	27,027	Everton FC	49,401
1962–63	26,944	Everton FC	51,603
1961–62	26,107	Tottenham Hotspur FC	45,576
1960–61	28,022	Tottenham Hotspur FC	53,124
1959–60	31,172	Tottenham Hotspur FC	47,948
1958–59	31,835	Manchester United	53,258
1957–58	31,258	Manchester United	46,073
1956–57	29,877	Manchester United	45,481
1955–56	30,560	Everton FC	42,768
1954–55	32,646	Chelsea FC	48,260
1953–54	34,888	Arsenal FC	50,278
1952–53	34,741	Arsenal FC	49,191
1951–52	34,888	Tottenham Hotspur FC	51,134
1950–51	36,110	Tottenham Hotspur FC	55,509
1949–50	37,284	Tottenham Hotspur FC	54,111
1948–49	38,792	Newcastle United FC	53,839
1947–48	36,175	Newcastle United FC	56,283
1946–47	32,253	Newcastle United FC	49,379
1938–39	24,820	Aston Villa FC	39,932
1937–38	25,160	Arsenal FC	44,045
1936–37	24,605	Arsenal FC	43,353
1935–36	24,624	Arsenal FC	41,960
1934–35	23,386	Arsenal FC	46,252
1933–34	22,625	Arsenal FC	40,750
1932–33	20,657	Arsenal FC	41,958
1931–32	21,529	Arsenal FC	40,547
1930–31	20,462	Arsenal FC	37,106
1929–30	22,647	Arsenal FC	35,537
1928–29	22,710	Manchester City FC	31,715
1927–28	22,885	Everton FC	37,461
1926–27	22,881	Newcastle United FC	36,510
1925–26	22,592	Chelsea FC	32,355
1924–25	21,609	Arsenal FC	29,485
1923–24	22,654	Chelsea FC	30,895
1922–23	23,213	Liverpool FC	33,495
1921–22	27,003	Chelsea FC	37,545
1920–21	29,252	Newcastle United FC	41,265
1919–20	24,036	Chelsea FC	42,615
1914–15	13,596	Manchester City FC	20,205
1913–14	21,979	Chelsea FC	37,105
1912–13	18,885	Chelsea FC	33,555
1911–12	16,635	Chelsea FC	26,295
1910–11	16,154	Newcastle United FC	25,055
1909–10	15,818	Chelsea FC	28,545
1908–09	16,357	Newcastle United FC	29,300
1907–08	16,809	Chelsea FC	31,965
1906–07	15,526	Newcastle United FC	33,235
1905–06	13,429	Newcastle United FC	22,765
1904–05	13,271	Newcastle United FC	21,605
1903–04	12,917	Aston Villa FC	20,035
1902–03	11,760	Aston Villa FC	19,790
1901–02	11,293	Aston Villa FC	19,580
1900–01	11,048	Aston Villa FC	17,530
1899–1900	9,521	Aston Villa FC	18,765
1898–99	10,058	Aston Villa FC	23,045
1897–98	9,558	Everton FC	17,390
1896–97	7,825	Everton FC	15,840
1895–96	8,050	Everton FC	16,080
1894–95	7,674	Everton FC	17,420
1893–94	6,999	Everton FC	13,520
1892–93	7,017	Everton FC	13,230
1891–92	6,193	Everton FC	10,730
1890–91	6,413	Everton FC	11,375
1889–90	5,466	Everton FC	10,110
1888–89	4,639	Everton FC	7,260
