= Ernest Bambridge =

English footballer (1848–1917)

Personal information
- Full name: Ernest Henry Bambridge
- Date of birth: 16 May 1848
- Place of birth: Windsor, England
- Date of death: 16 October 1917 (aged 69)
- Place of death: Southend-on-Sea, England
- Position: Half-back

Senior career*
Years	Team	Apps	(Gls)
- Windsor Home Park
- Swifts
- East Sheen
- Corinthian

International career
1876	England	1	(0)
- * Club domestic league appearances and goals

Ernest Henry Bambridge (16 May 1848 – 16 October 1917) was an English footballer who made one appearance as a forward for England in 1876. He was the eldest of three brothers who played for England.

== Career ==
His football career was spent with Windsor Home Park, Swifts, East Sheen and Corinthian and he gained representative honours for Berkshire. His solitary England appearance came on 4 March 1876 against Scotland at Hamilton Crescent, Partick. According to Philip Gibbons, "England struggled throughout the game, which saw the home team run out winners by three goals to nil."

His younger brothers, Arthur and Charles played 3 and 18 times respectively for England. They are the only trio of brothers to have played for England.

Bambridge earned his living as a member of the London Stock Exchange. He died in Southend on 16 October 1917.
