= Alexandra Meadows =

Cricket ground in Blackburn, England

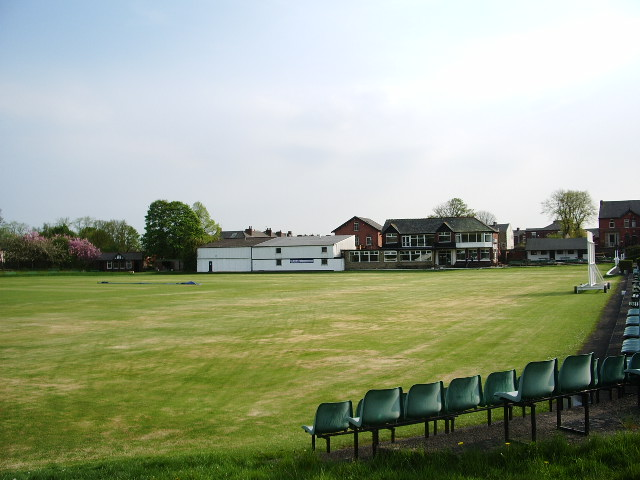

Alexandra Meadows is the home ground of the East Lancashire Cricket Club in Blackburn.

Between 1878 and 1881 the ground was used as the home venue for the Blackburn Rovers football team, following their move from the Pleasington Cricket Ground. The first Rovers match at the Meadows came in 1878 against Partick Thistle. In 1881 they left the ground to play at a newly built venue at Leamington Street.

The venue also hosted one match by the England national football team; a game against Wales played on 26 February 1881, a 1–0 win giving Wales their maiden international victory.
