= Clement Mitchell =

English sportsman (1862–1937)

Personal information
- Date of birth: 20 February 1862
- Place of birth: Cambridge, England
- Date of death: 6 October 1937 (aged 75)
- Place of death: Aldrington, Hove, England
- Position: Centre-forward

Senior career*
Years	Team	Apps	(Gls)
- Upton Park

International career
1880–1885	England	5	(5)
- * Club domestic league appearances and goals

Clement Mitchell (20 February 1862 – 6 October 1937) was an English sportsman who represented the England national football team and played first-class cricket for Kent County Cricket Club.

Mitchell was born at Cambridge in 1862 and was educated at Felsted School. He was the first Englishman to score a hat-trick against Wales in an international, with goals in the 16th, 70th and 90th minutes of their 1883 clash at Kennington Oval. A centre-forward, he also scored a goal in a loss to Scotland a month later and in a 1–1 draw with Wales at the 1885 British Home Championship.

Mitchell had been a dominant batsman at school and played club cricket for Crystal Palace Cricket Club. In club cricket he scored double centuries and between 1890 and 1892 made eight first-class cricket appearances as a left-handed batsman for Kent. He had less success at county cricket level, scoring 126 runs at a batting average of less than 10 runs per innings.

Mitchell died at Aldrington in Sussex in 1937 aged 75.

== Bibliography ==
- Carlaw, Derek (2020). Kent County Cricketers, A to Z: Part One (1806–1914) (PDF). Cardiff: ACS.
