= Swifts F.C. =

English former football club, based in Slough

- Full name: Swifts Football Club
- Nickname: the Birds
- Founded: 1871
- Dissolved: 1895; 131 years ago
- Ground: The Dolphin Cricket Ground, Slough
Home colours

Swifts Football Club were a football team based in Slough, England.

== History ==
The club was founded by Mr. William Mansfield Gardner of Uxbridge, Mr. Reginald T. Smith of Uxbridge, and Mr. F. Mitchell of Slough at around the same time they formed the Uxbridge Football Club in February 1871. Swifts played home matches at the Dolphin Ground near The Dolphin public house, Slough.

Their first recorded game was against Windsor Home Park on 18 February 1871 at Home Park which resulted in a 0–0 draw. F. Mitchell captained the Swifts team. The club produced several England players, most notable of whom was Charles Bambridge who made 18 appearances for the national team. In 1873 the club inflicted a record home defeat on the Wanderers, beating a depleted side 5–0 at the Kennington Oval.

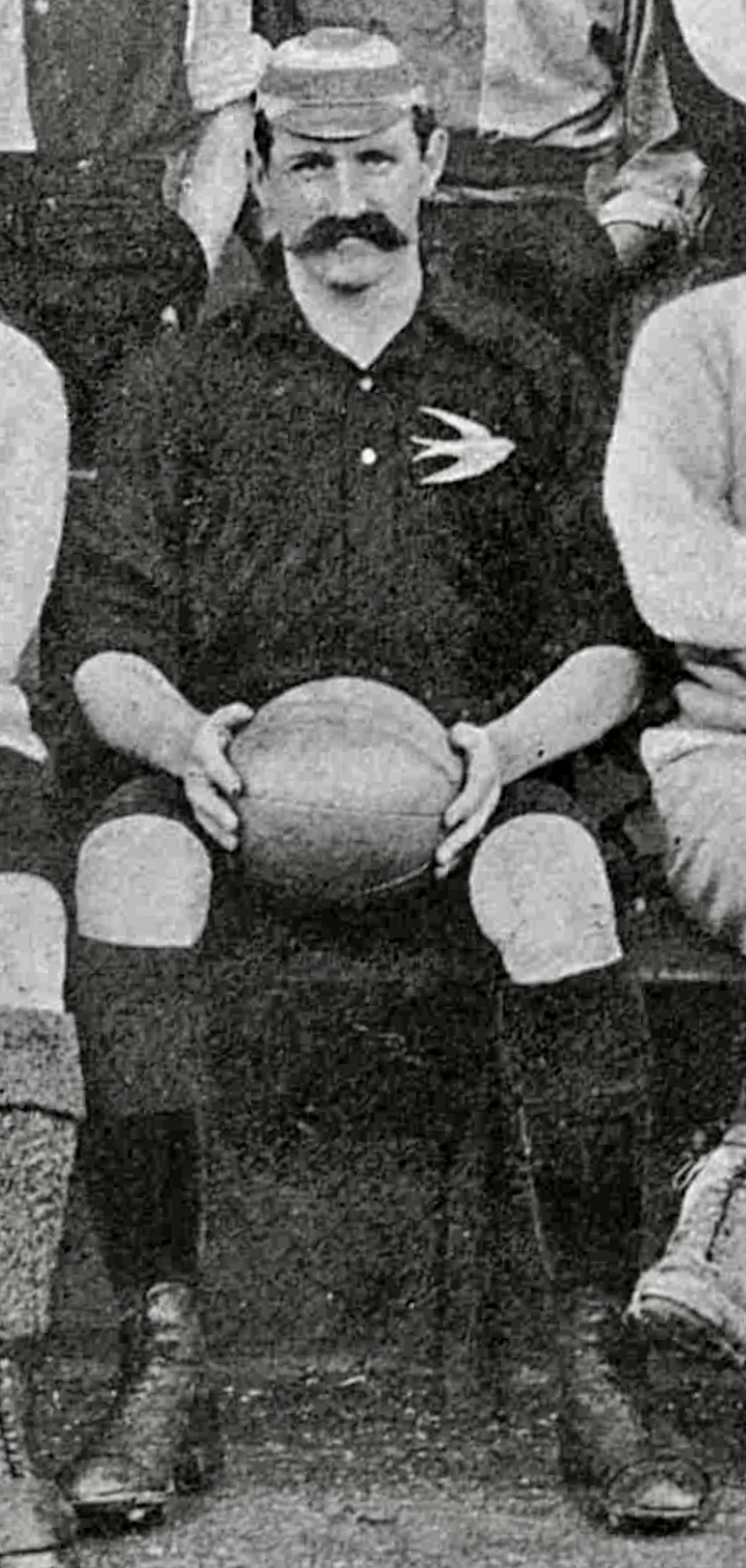
George Brann in Swifts colours, Illustrated Sporting and Dramatic News, 14 November 1891

=== FA Cup ===
The club first entered FA Cup competition in the 1873-1874 season. They reached the semi-finals, but lost 2–0 at the Oval to the Royal Engineers. Two years later in the 1875-1876 FA Cup they would make the semi-finals again this time losing 2–1 to eventual champions Wanderers. It would be another ten years, in the 1885-1886 season, before Swifts would reach FA Cup semi-finals again, playing against defending champions Blackburn Rovers. Rovers would go on to win 2–1 on the 13 March 1886, a month later Blackburn would retain the FA Cup beating West Bromwich Albion.

In 1887–88 FA Cup competition the club looked to have reached the fifth round, having beaten Crewe Alexandra 3–2 at the Queen's Ground in West Kensington, but the Railwaymen appealed the result on the basis that one of the crossbars was too low, one of the directors having measured the posts before the match and keeping the information private as an insurance policy. The FA reluctantly upheld the protest and ordered a replay, which Crewe won 2–1. The next month the Football Association passed a motion of censure against Crewe for conduct that was "most unsportsmanlike and calculated to degrade the game of association football in the estimation of those of the public who wish to see it played in a proper spirit."

=== Final years ===
The final full season was 1890–91, the club winning half of its 20 matches. Swifts entered the 1891–92 FA Cup qualifying rounds and were drawn at home to Wolverton, but, with the Bambridge brothers having retired from the game, the Swifts scratched, having not been able to raise a team; worse, the club lost the use of the Dolphin Ground, which became the sole preserve of the revamped Slough club. In the 1892–93 FA Cup they reached the second qualifying round, but lost 4–2 against Polytechnic.

Swifts last entry into the FA Cup was in the 1893–94 season. They received a bye in the first qualifying round but scratched their second qualifying round game against Norwich CEYMS on 4 November 1893. On 27 January 1894 they were unable to form an eleven to journey to Marlow and had played only 'half-a-dozen' games that season. Their last recorded game was against Old Kendricks F.C. on 27 November 1895.

== Colours ==
The club colours were originally white with a black swift on the shirt and black stockings, and by 1877 it changed to black shirts with a white swift, white knickerbockers, and black stockings.

== England international players ==
The following eight players played for England whilst on the books of Swifts F.C. (with the number of caps received whilst registered with Swifts F.C.):

- Arthur Bambridge (3 caps)
- Charles Bambridge (18 caps)
- Ernest Bambridge (1 cap)
- George Brann (3 caps)
- Edward Haygarth (1 cap)
- Francis Pawson (1 cap)
- William Rose (3 caps)
- Frank Saunders (1 cap)

== Scotland international players ==
- Dr John Smith (10 caps)
- Andrew Watson (3 caps)

== Honours ==
London Charity Cup:

- Winners: 1886–87, 1887–88
- Runners-up: 1888–89

Berkshire & Buckinghamshire Senior Cup:

- Winners: 1879–80, 1881–82
- Runners-up: 1882-83
