= Chesterman =

Chesterman is a surname. Notable people with the surname include:

- Alex Chesterman (born 1970), British internet entrepreneur
- Ché Chesterman
- Ian Chesterman (born 1959), Australian sports administrator
- Ron Chesterman (1939–2007), English musician and archivist
- William Chesterman (1837–1930), British sportsman and industrialist
