= Arthur Pember =

British sportsman

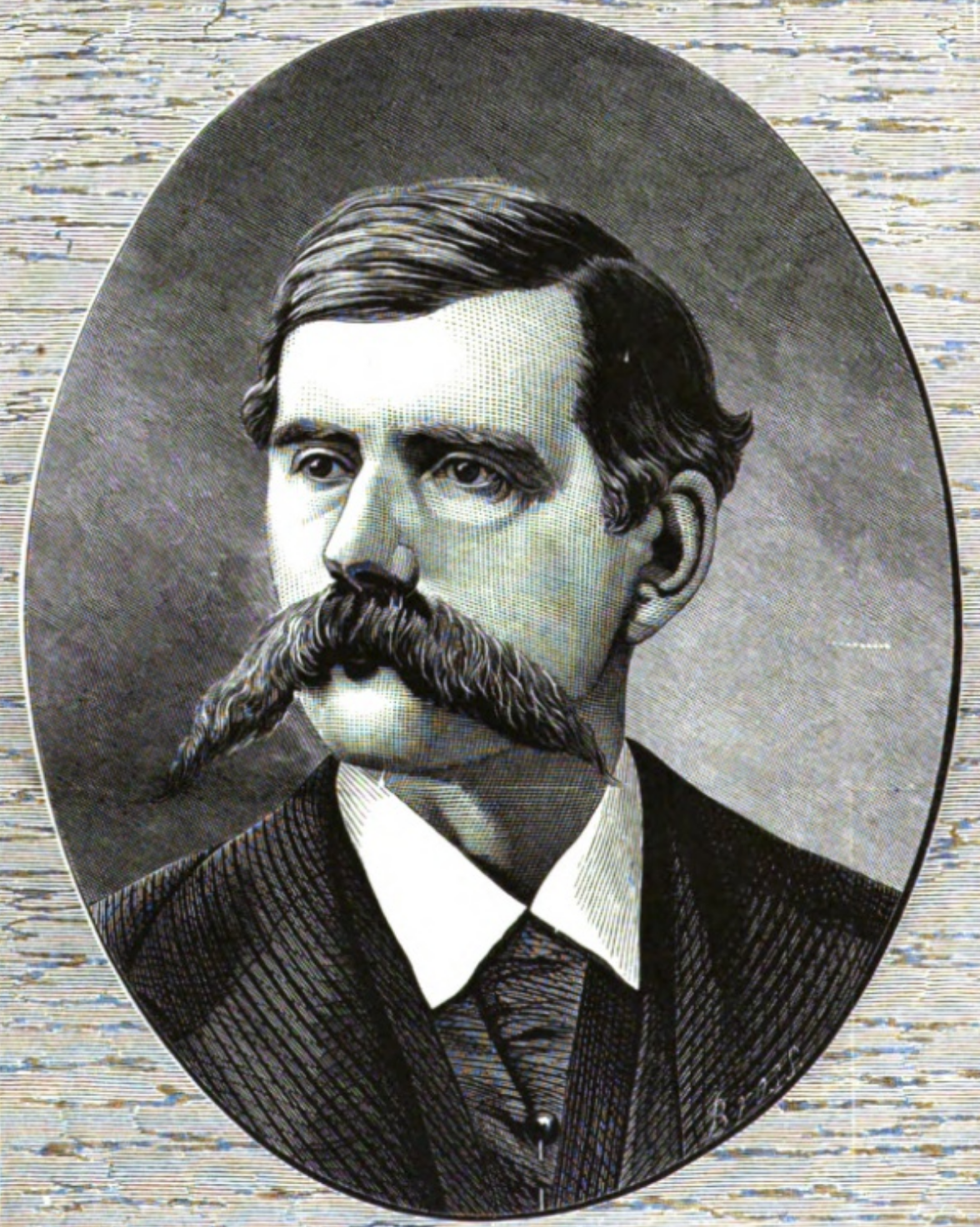
- Portrait of Arthur Pember, from "The Mysteries and Miseries of the Great Metropolis" (1874)
- Born: 15 January 1835; Brixton, Surrey, England
- Died: 3 April 1886 (aged 51); LaMoure, Dakota Territory, US
- Occupations: Stockbroker, journalist
- Known for: First president of the Football Association

Arthur Pember (15 January 1835 – 3 April 1886) was a British sportsman, stockbroker, lawyer, journalist and writer. He served as the first president of The Football Association from 1863 to 1867.

== Early life ==
Pember was born in 1835 into a wealthy family, the third child and second son of a stockbroker. He grew up in the Brixton Hill and Clapham Park suburbs of London. Educated at home, he did not attend university. In 1857, he joined his father working as a stockbroker in the City of London. In March 1860, he married Elizabeth Hoghton. The newly married couple moved to their own house in Carlton Road, Maida Vale, but Elizabeth died of complications of a miscarriage in December of that same year. Pember remarried in October 1862 to Alice Mary Grieve.

== Sportsman ==
=== Football ===
It was around this time that Pember became associated with N.N. Football Club, which played on fields opposite his house. Both Arthur and his younger brother George are recorded playing for N.N. in a victory over Barnes F.C. in April 1863. Pember represented N.N. as club captain at the first meeting of the Football Association (FA) on 26 October 1863. This meeting began with Pember being "requested to take the chair", and ended with him being formally elected the Association's first president.

=== Creation of the FA's 1863 Laws ===
At this time, some football clubs followed the example of Rugby School by allowing the ball to be carried in the hands, with players allowed to "hack" (kick in the shins) opponents who were carrying the ball. Other clubs forbade both practices. During the meetings to draw up the FA laws, there was an acrimonious division between the "hacking" and "non-hacking" clubs, with Pember being "dead against" hacking. An FA meeting of 17 November 1863 discussed this question, with the "hacking" clubs predominating. A further meeting was scheduled in order to finalize ("settle") the laws.

At this crucial 24 November meeting, the "hackers" were again in a narrow majority. During the meeting, however, FA secretary Ebenezer Morley brought the delegates' attention to a recently published set of football laws from Cambridge University which banned carrying and hacking. Discussion of the Cambridge rules, and suggestions for possible communication with Cambridge on the subject, served to delay the final "settlement" of the laws to a further meeting, on 1 December. A number of representatives who supported rugby-style football did not attend this additional meeting, resulting in hacking and carrying being banned.

Francis Campbell of Blackheath, the most prominent "hacking" club, accused Pember of improperly managing the 24 November meeting, with the purpose of preventing the "pro-hacking" laws from being adopted. Pember strongly denied such an "accusation of ungentlemanly conduct". The verdicts of later historians have been mixed: Young accuses Campbell of "arrogance", while Harvey supports Campbell's allegations, accusing Pember (along with Morley and their allies) of a "coup" against the pro-hacking clubs.

The final version of the FA's laws was formally adopted and published in December 1863. On 2 January 1864, Pember led his "President's Side" to victory over the "Secretary's Side" in a friendly match at Battersea Park to test out the new laws.

=== Subsequent activity as FA President ===
In February 1866, Pember chaired the FA meeting that created the second edition of the Laws of the Game. The original 1863 laws had permitted a goal to be scored at any height between two posts eight yards apart. Pember urged that a tape be strung between the posts, with a goal counting only if the ball went below the tape. The meeting agreed to make this change, setting the height of the tape at 8 feet. The dimensions of the goal have remained the same ever since, with the tape subsequently replaced by a crossbar. Pember also "strongly objected" to the practice of striking the ball with the hands, at that time allowed by the FA laws, saying that it was "not football, as the game had to be played with the feet, and not with the hands": "knocking on" was subsequently outlawed in 1867.

At the same meeting, Pember accepted an invitation from Sheffield FC to a match under Association rules, and captained the victorious London team in the ensuing London v Sheffield match, played in March 1866. Pember also played for Wanderers F.C. in November 1866.

Pember was twice re-elected FA President, in October 1864 and February 1866. At its next annual meeting in February 1867, which Pember did not attend, the FA elected Morley to replace him as president. Pember's name is absent from records of subsequent FA annual meetings.

=== Mountaineering ===
In addition to being a footballer, Pember was a keen outdoorsman. He successfully climbed Mont Blanc in August 1863, and would go on to describe his experience on the mountain in public lectures.

== Journalist ==
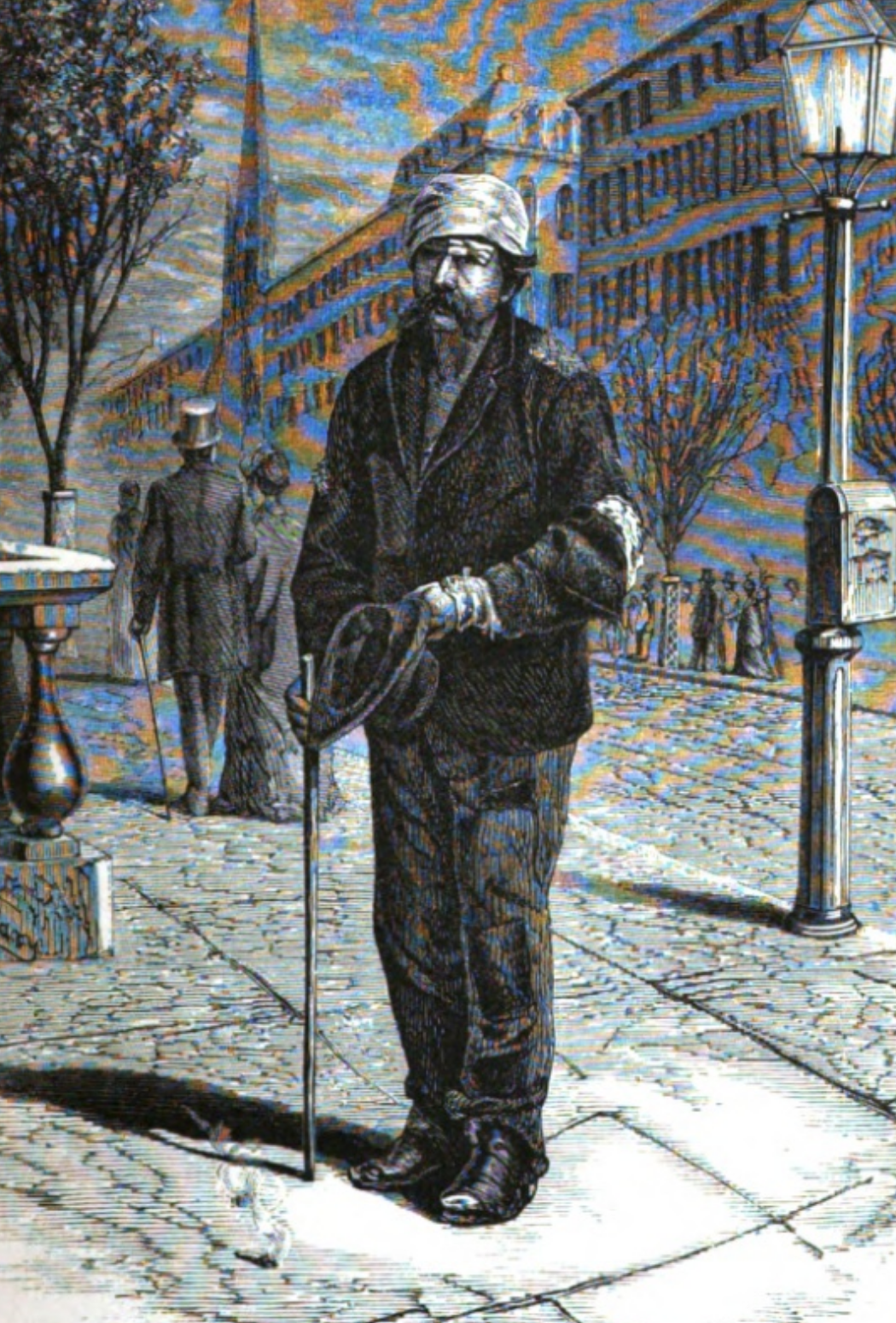
As part of his journalism work, Pember would adopt disguises, here as a beggar

In 1868, Pember emigrated with his wife and two sons to New York, where he started a new career as a journalist.

Working initially for the New York Tribune, Pember investigated crime and corruption in New York City. In 1871, along with colleague Edward Breck, he published an exposé of so-called "panel-houses" ("places for robbery, most ingeniously prepared and carried on under the guise of prostitution"), in which he named both the owners of the establishments and the police officers who were bribed to permit their crimes to continue. Pember's aggressive journalistic style was described as "attack[ing] the specialty of abuses like a terrier after rats, hesitating at no sort of a hole or vileness of vermin".

In 1871 and 1872, Pember contributed to a lengthy series of articles in The New York Times on "Our State Institutions". He followed this up in 1872 and 1873 with a series of The New York Times articles exploring "how the other half lives", for which the author assumed several disguises including beggar and circus performer. These articles were collected and edited, with substantial additional material, into Pember's 1874 book The Mysteries and Miseries of the Great Metropolis.

In 1875, Pember appeared before a New York state legislative crime committee in order to testify about the police collusion he had discovered in 1871.

== Later life ==
After having given birth to ten children in 14 years, Pember's wife Alice died of typhoid in 1881. She was 36 years old.

In May 1884, Pember moved with his five sons from New York to LaMoure, Dakota Territory, in order to become a stock farmer. According to one account, he "was told by his doctor one day that if he did not cease pumping his brains into a daily paper, his heart would soon stop pumping blood into his brains". According to his obituary, on the other hand, the motivation for the move was to "transfer his boys from the temptations of the city to the country". An 1885 newspaper article reported that Pember was writing a book entitled "Twenty Years in New York Journalism".

== Death ==
On the morning of 3 April 1886, Pember died in his residence at LaMoure. The cause of death was a kidney disorder. A substantial obituary appeared in the local newspaper. Its anonymous author remembered Pember as a "welcome addition to the little gatherings ... which serve to relieve the tedium of village life", praising his "superior intelligence", "racy reminiscences of journalistic life" and "pungent comments on current events". The article explored Pember's education in England and journalistic career in New York in some detail, but said nothing about football.

== Descendants ==
Pember had ten children with his wife Alice, of whom six survived infancy. His English-born daughter Lillian (b. London 1866; d. London 1925) was adopted by his brother Edward and remained in that country; his two English-born sons Cyril Fugion (b. London 1865; d. New York 1936) and St. John Bentley (b. London 1867; d. St. Paul, MN 1888) emigrated with their parents to New York in 1868. His three American-born sons who survived infancy were Roosa Herbert (b. Connecticut 1869; 3 children), Gilbert Edward (b. New York 1876; d. Pennsylvania 1934) and Godfrey Churchill (b. New York 1879; d. Poughkeepsie, NY 1970; 4 children). His four children who died in infancy were twin daughters Mabel (d. 27 July 1875) and Alice Richardson (d. 30 July 1875), and sons Valentine (d. 18 July 1874) and Geoffrey Francis (d. 21 July 1872).

== See also ==
- The Man with the Twisted Lip, a fictional Sherlock Holmes adventure, published in 1891, involving a journalist who disguised himself as a beggar

== Notable publications ==
- [anonymous] (2 January 1869). "New York After Dark: Exploring Water St". New-York Daily Tribune. Vol. xxviii, no. 8654. p. 2. (included in The Mysteries and Miseries of the Great Metropolis under the title "The Purlieus of Water Street after Dark")
- An English Ritualist (February 1869). "Ritualism in England". The Atlantic Monthly. Vol. xxiii, no. cxxxvi. Boston. pp. 188–198. hdl:2027/uc1.32106008591676.
- Pember, Arthur (March 1870). "The Coming Revolution in England". Lippincott's Magazine. Vol. v, no. 16. Philadelphia. pp. 279–286. hdl:2027/njp.32101073757864.
- [anonymous] [with Edward Breck] (16 March 1871). "Gambling and Panel Houses". New-York Daily Tribune. xxx (9342): 1–2. (edited version included in The Mysteries and Miseries of the Great Metropolis under the title "After the Gambling and Panel Houses")
- A. P. (17 March 1872). "The Beggars' Banquet" (PDF). The New York Times. Vol. xxi, no. 6393. pp. 4–5. (included in The Mysteries and Miseries of the Great Metropolis)
- [anonymous] (21 April 1872). "The Amateur Beggar" (PDF). The New York Times. Vol. xxi, no. 6423. p. 5. (included in The Mysteries and Miseries of the Great Metropolis)
- [anonymous] (19 May 1872). "Life in a Circus" (PDF). The New York Times. p. 5. (included in The Mysteries and Miseries of the Great Metropolis)
- [anonymous] (16 June 1872). "A Ride on an Engine" (PDF). The New York Times. p. 4. (included in The Mysteries and Miseries of the Great Metropolis)
- [anonymous] (23 June 1872). "The Life of a Tramp" (PDF). The New York Times. p. 4. (included in The Mysteries and Miseries of the Great Metropolis)
- [anonymous] (7 July 1872). "Life on the Erie Canal" (PDF). The New York Times. p. 4. (included in The Mysteries and Miseries of the Great Metropolis)
- [anonymous] (6 October 1872). "The Model Costermonger" (PDF). The New York Times. p. 3. (included in The Mysteries and Miseries of the Great Metropolis)
- [anonymous] (1 December 1872). "Down in a Coal Mine" (PDF). The New York Times. p. 3. (included in The Mysteries and Miseries of the Great Metropolis)
- [anonymous] (16 August 1873). "The Peep-Show Man" (PDF). The New York Times. p. 3. (included in The Mysteries and Miseries of the Great Metropolis)
- Pember, Arthur (November 1873). "Two Boys' Ascent of Vesuvius". Our Young Folks. Vol. ix, no. xi. Boston: Osgood. pp. 680–685.
- A. P. (the amateur vagabond) (1874). The Mysteries and Miseries of the Great Metropolis. New York: Appleton.
