= London v Sheffield (1866) =

London	Sheffield
2 (4)	0 (0)
- Date: 31 March 1866
- Venue: Battersea Park, London
- Weather: intermittent rain, hail

London v. Sheffield was an association football game played on 31 March 1866. According to Charles Alcock, it was the "first match of any importance under the auspices of the Football Association".

== Origin ==
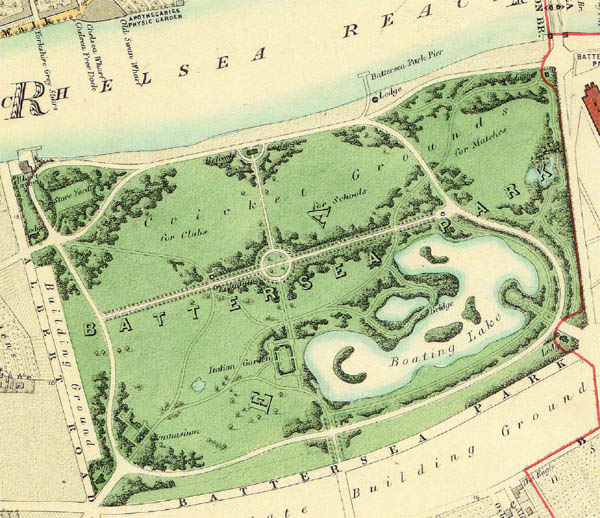
Map of Battersea Park (1862)

The match was suggested in a letter from William Chesterman, secretary of Sheffield F.C., sent to the Football Association in February 1866. Chesterman stated that the Sheffield rules of the time were "nearly the same as those of the [Football] association", and went on to suggest the "advisability of the clubs in Sheffield playing a picked team from London, composed of the clubs playing under association rules".

The Football Association (FA) accepted the challenge, setting the following conditions on the match:

- the game would be played by eleven players on each side (at this time the laws of the game did not specify the size of each team)
- the game would be played at Battersea Park, on a ground 120 yards long and 80 yards wide
- the game would last 90 minutes, from 3pm to 4:30 (the laws did not specify the length of a match, and there was no provision for half-time)
- the ball would be a "Lillywhite number 5"
- the London team would wear a white jersey or shirt and white trousers

In fact, the team representing Sheffield would consist entirely of players from Sheffield F.C., while the London team would be dominated by players from Barnes F.C., Wanderers F.C. and N.N. Club, the leading Association clubs at that time.

== Rules ==
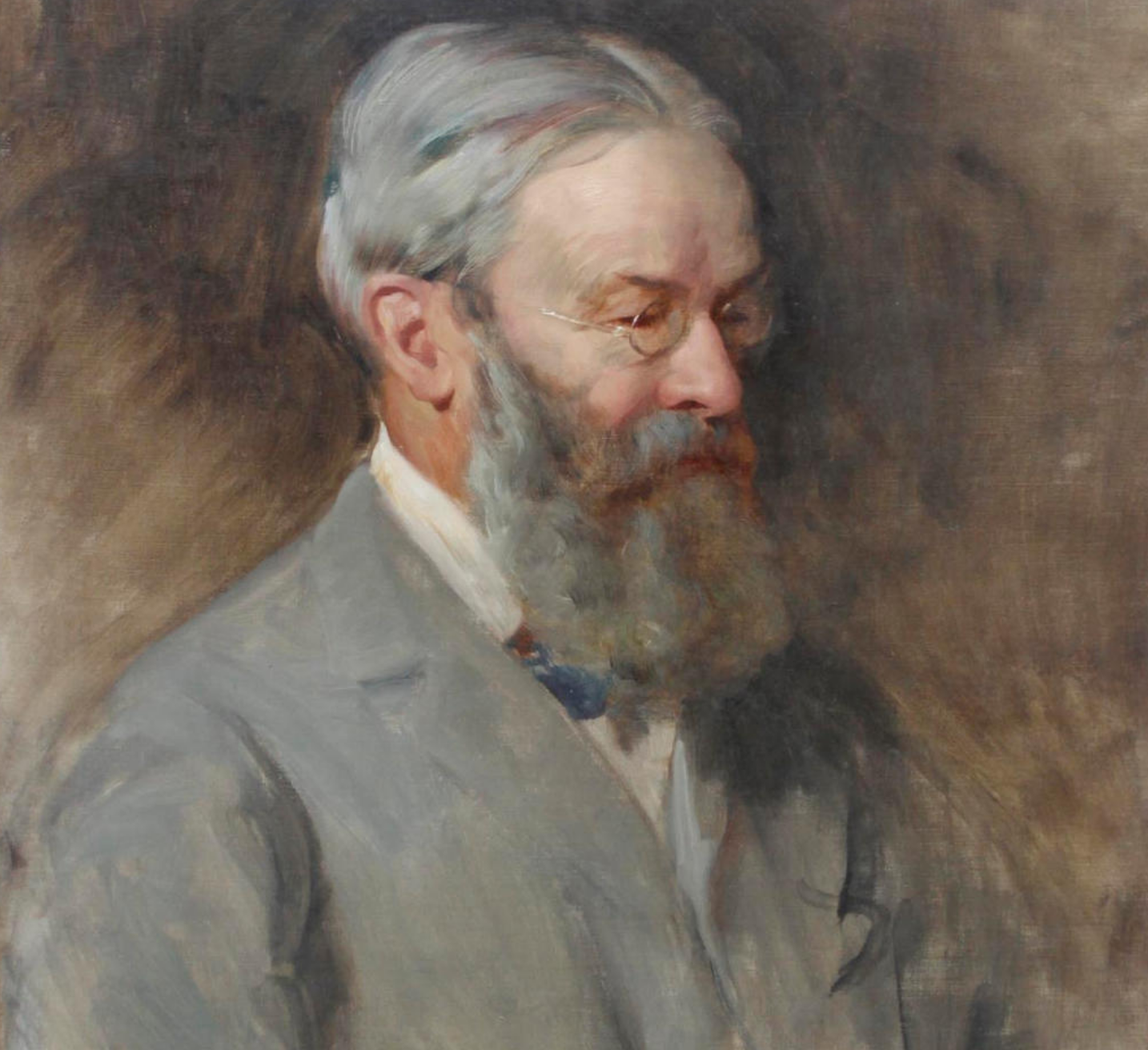
William Chesterman (shown here in 1914) proposed the match and captained the Sheffield team

Chesterman agreed that the match would be played under the 1866 revision of the FA's Laws of the Game, which had been adopted less than six weeks earlier. This set of rules introduced the "touch down" (similar to a try in present-day rugby) as a tie-breaker for games where each side scored an equal number of goals. Other notable features of the laws included:

- Any player was allowed to catch or knock the ball with his hands (but throwing the ball and running with the ball was forbidden)
- The throw-in could be taken with one hand; it had to be thrown at right-angles to the touch-line (similar to present-day rugby union). It was awarded to the first team to touch the ball after it went out of play.
- There was no corner-kick; a goal-kick was awarded whenever the ball went behind the goal-line (regardless of which team had touched the ball).
- There was no punishment for infringements of the rules (and thus no free-kick or penalty-kick).
- Teams changed ends after each goal was scored.
- There was no break for half-time.
- The offside law required three opponents between a player and the opponents' goal

== Preparation ==
Sheffield FC held a training match one week prior to the game to "practice the Rules of the Football Association". Among the most prominent differences between the codes were offside (the FA had a fairly strict offside law; the printed Sheffield laws of 1862 had no offside law at all, although at various times the club had experimented with different offside laws), handling (while both codes permitted the ball to be caught, the FA code also allowed the ball to be struck with the hand, though a goal could not be scored in this manner), and the smaller width of the Sheffield goal (four yards, as opposed to the FA's eight yards). It is likely that Sheffield's relative unfamiliarity with the FA rules gave an advantage to the London team.

== Match ==
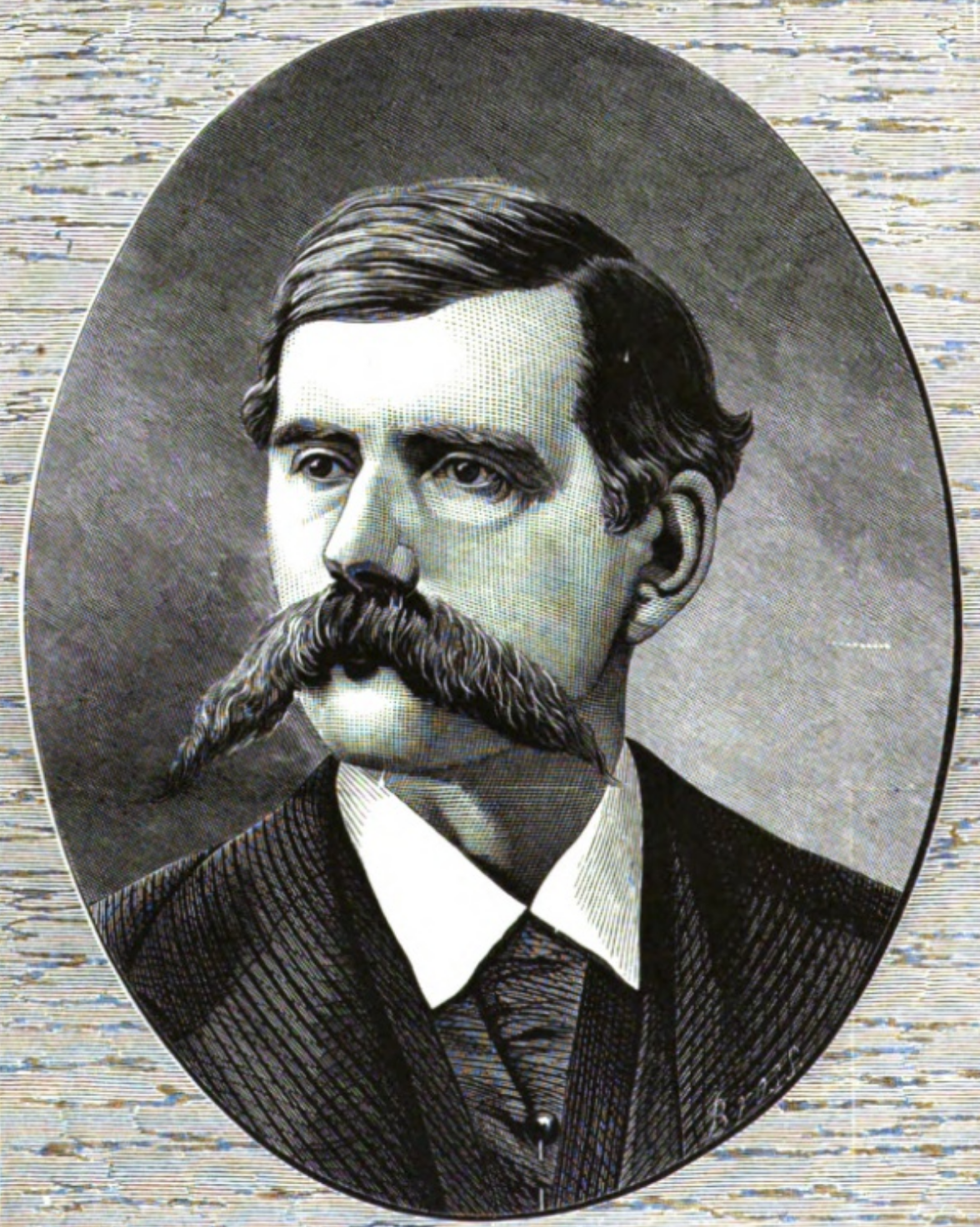
Arthur Pember, the victorious London captain

=== Summary ===
Sheffield won the toss, and chose the western end of the ground in order to take advantage of the wind. Arthur Pember kicked off for London. After 10 to 15 minutes of play, Ebenezer Morley kicked a goal for London. Under the rules, this meant that the teams changed ends for the ensuing kick-off. After a further period of play (ranging from a "few minutes" to "half an hour" in the reports), Barnes scored a touch down for London. After good play from Martin, Charles Alcock then kicked a goal for London, but it was disallowed by the umpire for offside.

The sources differ on the details of much of the remainder of the match. There is consensus that London's second goal was kicked by Martin, and that Tebbut and Barnes scored touches down. The identity of the scorer of London's final touch down is disputed, with two sources crediting Martin and a third Baker. The sources agree that the game ended in a torrent of rain and driving hail. Sheffield refused to finish the game early, despite the terrible conditions.

The Sheffield players "strongly objected to the amount of 'handling' practised by the Londoners". Describing his memories of the match almost forty years later, Chesterman reminisced:

"Knocking on" was allowed, and every goal that was scored was knocked through, and many a fist found a nose. Still it was a pleasant match [Loud laughter]

=== Details ===
31 March 1866
15:15

London	2 (4) – 0 (0)	Sheffield
Goals: Morley, Martin; Touches down: Barnes (2), Tebbut, Martin

Battersea Park, London

London	Sheffield

London:
Arthur Pember (N. N.) (capt.)
Charles Alcock (Wanderers)
Alfred Baker (N.N.)
J. K. Barnes (Barnes)
E. D. Elphinstone (Civil Service)
Arthur Kinnaird (Wanderers)
John Biddulph Martin (Wanderers)
Ebenezer Morley (Barnes)
D. M. O'Leary (Barnes)
C. M. Tebbut (N.N.)
Robert Willis (Barnes)

Sheffield:
William Chesterman (capt.)
W. Baker
Harry Chambers
J. Denton
A. A. Dixon
F. Knowles
J. Knowles
J. C. Shaw
B. Shepherd
J. D. Webster
A. Wightman

== Post-match ==
After the match, the teams dined together at The Albion Tavern, Russell Street, Covent Garden, where toasts were exchanged.

== Return match ==
At the Sheffield FC annual general meeting in September 1866, the club's loss was described as "the most severe defeat it has ever been your misfortune to encounter, but it is to be hoped that you will return the compliment this season".

Later that year, Harry Chambers (who had replaced Chesterman as secretary of Sheffield FC) wrote to the FA proposing a return match to be held in Sheffield under Sheffield rules. On 12 November 1866, the FA accepted this offer, but specified that only FA rules could be played. A return match in Sheffield was subsequently scheduled for 19 January 1867. Two days before this game was due to be played, it was postponed to March or April because of bad weather. During this delay, two developments occurred that served to emphasize the differences between the London and Sheffield codes of football:

- On 28 February, the FA met to revise its laws. All four amendments proposed by Sheffield FC were rejected. Morley (now elected president of the FA) did nevertheless state that the return match with Sheffield should go ahead "for the sake of the game, if not out of common courtesy".
- On 6 March, the newly-formed Sheffield Football Association issued its own first set of laws, which reiterated the distinctive features of the Sheffield game (such as a very weak offside law).

Although the match was fixed for 6 April, with Sheffield FC arranging a "practice match" for Saturday 16 March 1867 and warning its members that there remained "only one or two Saturdays before the Match with London", the return match did not take place that year.

In fact, the next meeting between the two teams would not take place until December 1871, when they met at Bramall Lane in Sheffield, and played under Sheffield Rules. Since the Football Association refused to sanction play under any rules but its own, the "London" team for this meeting was an unofficial eleven assembled by Charles Alcock, while the "Sheffield" team represented all the clubs of the Sheffield Football Association.
