= Harry Walker Chambers =

British sportsman (1842–1907)

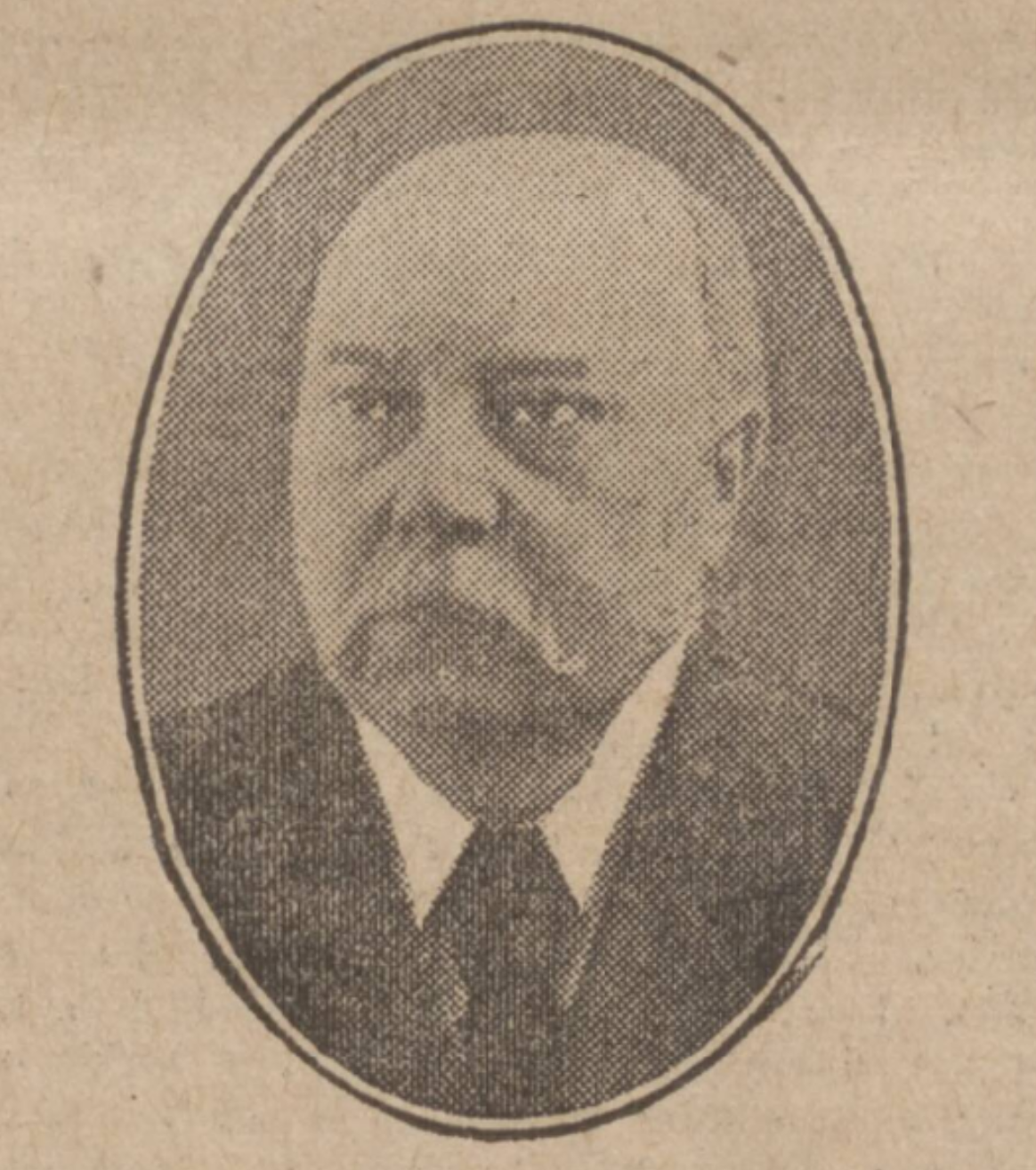
- Born: 10 February 1842; Sheffield
- Died: 21 December 1907 (aged 65); Sheffield
- Occupation: Lawyer
- Known for: Footballer and administrator

Harry Walker Chambers (10 February 1842 – 21 December 1907) was a British sportsman and lawyer. Chambers served as secretary of Sheffield Football Club from 1866 to 1876, succeeding William Chesterman. He also served as the first President of the Sheffield Football Association, from 1867 to 1869.

According to his published reminiscences, Chambers attended the first meetings of the Football Association (FA) in 1863, on behalf of Sheffield F.C., and also played in the "test match" to test the new laws in Battersea Park in January 1864. Chambers also participated in the historic London v Sheffield match of 1866.

Chambers' preferred position was goalkeeper. He kept goal for Wanderers FC in a match against Queen's Park F.C. at Hampden Park in 1875, which the Wanderers lost 6–0.

He also served on Sheffield City Council for fifteen years, starting in 1890.
