= William Prest =

English cricketer and footballer (1832–1885)

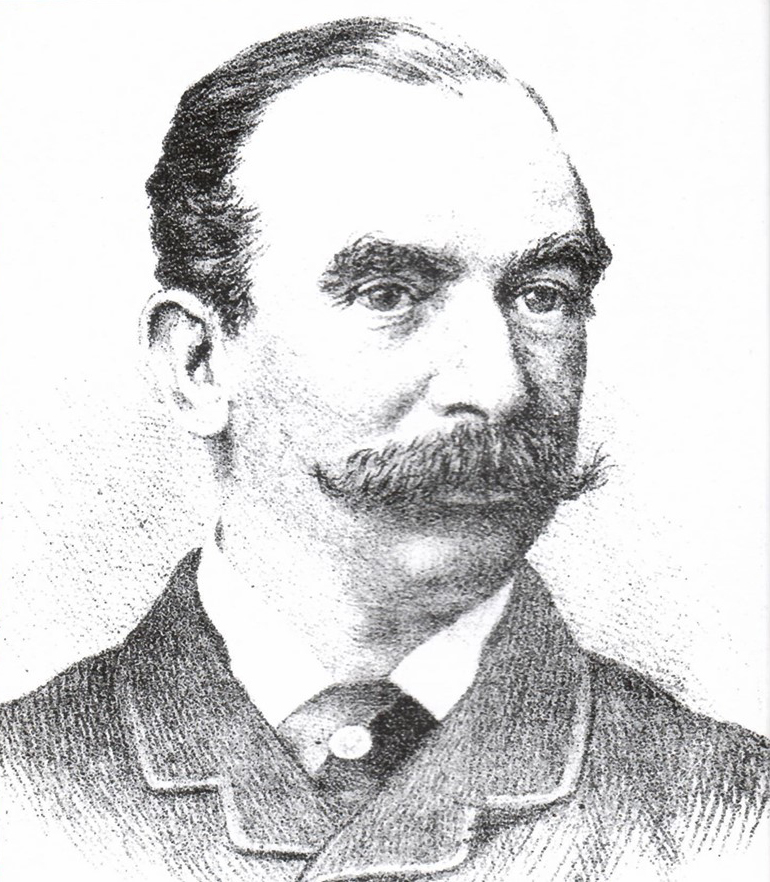
William Prest, Sheffield F.C. founder

William Prest (1 April 1832 – 10 February 1885) was an English cricketer and footballer born in York. He lived most of his life in Sheffield where he went on to become co-founder of Sheffield Football Club and captained Sheffield Cricket Club (aka Yorkshire). He was also involved with the formation of a local regiment, the Hallamshire Rifles, with which he served for most of his life.

William was son of John and Arabella Prest and moved with them to Sheffield when his brother John Beevor Prest bought a wine business. There he became a noted cricketer and played for Sheffield 16 times between 1852 and 1862. He scored 286 runs at an average of 10.21 as a batter and got a total of 3 wickets for 69 runs as a bowler. All 3 wickets came in the same match.

In the winter of 1854, Prest attended the meeting at the Adelphi Hotel in Arundel Gate when the Sheffield Cricket Club agreed to lease a new ground from the Duke of Norfolk next to Bramall Lane.

He also played for "The Eleven" against "The Twenty-two" in the first cricket match at the venue on 30 April 1855. He was bowled out by Joseph Rowbotham in the first innings without scoring a run and thus became the first player to score a duck at the ground.

Prest was co-founder of Sheffield F.C. and the Sheffield Rules for football. He took part in football matches played by Sheffield C.C. from 1855. In 1857 he and Nathaniel Creswick decided to create a football club. The club was officially formed on 24 October with Prest becoming one of the vice-presidents. The club also established an annual athletics meeting to be held at the end of each season. At the inaugural event, watched by a crowd of 4000, Prest excelled, winning a total of 12 events.

In 1859 William Prest was involved with the formation of the 2nd West Yorkshire Rifles, better known as the Hallamshire Rifles. He was involved with the battalion until his death and rose to the rank of lieutenant colonel. He died on 10 February 1885 (aged 52) due to a seizure caused by a burst blood vessel. His funeral was held at Sheffield General Cemetery three days later with full military honours. The route was lined with several thousand mourners.
