= Nathaniel Creswick =

English footballer (1831–1917)

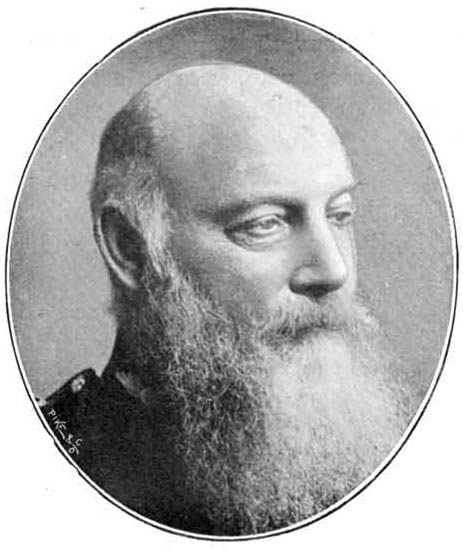
Portrait of Creswick

Sir Nathaniel Creswick KCB (31 July 1831 – 20 October 1917) was an English footballer who co-founded Sheffield FC, the oldest football club in the world, in 1857. With William Prest, he established the Sheffield Rules, which were highly influential upon the modern laws of association football. He was also a founder of the Hallamshire Rifles.

== Biography ==
Creswick was born in Sheffield, England to Nathaniel and Elizabeth. His father was a silver plating manufacturer. He was educated at Sheffield Collegiate School and became a solicitor of a silver-plate company. He became involved with several local sports clubs including the Clarkhouse Road Fencing Club and Sheffield Cricket Club.

While at Sheffield CC, he joined several other players in informal football matches that started in 1855.

He and William Prest decided to create an independent football club which was founded on 24 October 1857 with Creswick as Honorary Secretary and Treasurer. The club, known as Sheffield Football Club, is officially accepted by FIFA as being the oldest football club in the world.

They also established a set of playing rules to be used by the club. These were later used by other clubs in the area and eventually spread to many clubs in the north of England and became known as the Sheffield Rules.

Creswick resigned the office of secretary in February 1862, being replaced by William Chesterman.

Creswick and Prest were also involved in founding the 2nd West Yorkshire Rifles (better known as the Hallamshire Rifles) in 1858. He remained with them until 1897 rising to the rank of Colonel. Already a Companion of the Order of the Bath (CB), he was knighted as a Knight Commander of the Order of the Bath (KCB) in the 1909 Birthday Honours.

On 2 July 1891, Nathaniel Creswick chaired the Founders' meeting of Sheffield's first, pioneering golf club - the Sheffield and District Golf Club - whence he served as the club's first Captain and President. Like Creswick, a number of his fellow Founders had been early Sheffield FC players and Hallamshire Rifles officers too. Almost immediately The Sheffield & District Golf Club's course on Lindrick Common gained renown as a regular championship golfing venue, which it still is. In 1934 the club's members changed its name to Lindrick Golf Club. Most famously, in October 1957, Lindrick hosted the Ryder Cup, and became the last course on which the Great Britain and Ireland team, led by Dai Rees, beat the USA before the inclusion of European players. Since then Lindrick Golf Club has played host to a number of events including the Curtis Cup in 1960, the Dunlop Masters (1966 & 1977), the Sun Alliance Match Play Championship (1975) and the Martini International (1982). Lindrick also regularly hosts Open Championship Regional Qualifiers.
