= William Chesterman =

British sportsman

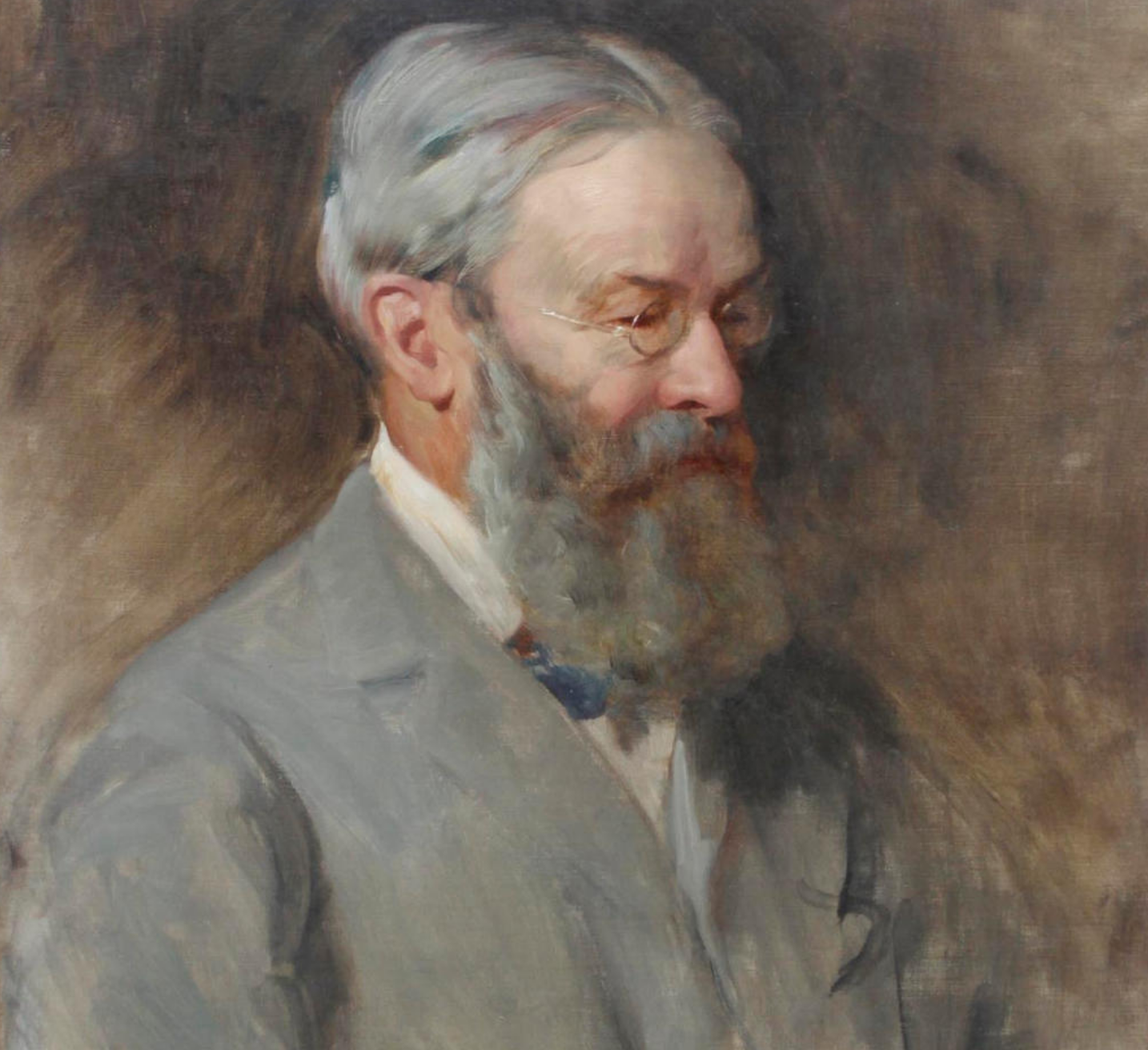
- Portrait of William Chesterman, from 1914
- Born: 22 December 1837; Sheffield
- Died: 6 January 1930 (aged 92); Sheffield
- Occupation: Industrialist
- Known for: Secretary of Sheffield Football Club

William Chesterman (22 December 1837 – 6 January 1930) was a British sportsman and industrialist. By his own confession a "weak but ardent footballer", Chesterman served as secretary of Sheffield Football Club from February 1862 to September 1866, replacing club founder Nathaniel Creswick in this role; he also acted as treasurer of the club during that period. Chesterman was succeeded in both these roles by Harry Chambers. In February 1866, Chesterman proposed the idea of a match between Sheffield and a representative FA team, subsequently leading the "Sheffield" team in the historic London v Sheffield football match in March of that year. Chesterman continued to be associated with Sheffield FC for decades. He was a member of the committee in 1889, when the club took the decision to remain amateur.

Although he was no longer secretary of Sheffield FC at the time, Chesterman represented the club at the 1867 meeting of the Football Association (FA). At that meeting, which was attended by only six representatives, Chesterman was elected to the FA's committee. He continued to serve on the FA committee until 1871.

As an industrialist, Chesterman was the principal partner of James Chesterman and Co, a manufacturer of measuring instruments. Chesterman's father, James, had founded the company after inventing a spring-loaded tape measure with an automatic recoil mechanism. As a result of his prominence in business, Chesterman served as Master Cutler from 1880 to 1881.
