= Sheffield F.C. =

World's oldest existing association football club

Coordinates: 53.31°N 1.48°W

- Full name: Sheffield Football Club
- Nickname: The Club
- Founded: 24 October 1857; 169 years ago
- Ground: Home of Football Ground, Dronfield, Derbyshire
- Capacity: 2,089 (250 seats)
- Chairman: Jon McClure
- Manager: Craig Denton
- League: United Counties League Premier Division North
- 2025–26: Northern Counties East League Premier Division, 3rd of 20 (transferred)
- Website: sheffieldfc.com
Home colours	Away colours

Sheffield Football Club is an English football club, currently based in Dronfield, Derbyshire. They compete in the United Counties League Premier Division North, at the ninth level of the English football pyramid. Founded in October 1857, the club is considered by FIFA as the oldest existing independent club still playing football in the world.

Sheffield F.C. initially played games amongst each other under the Sheffield Rules and did not officially adopt the new FA rules until 1878.

The club competes in the Rules derby with near neighbours Hallam. In 2004, they were given the FIFA Order of Merit, an award given to only one other club; Real Madrid. In 2007 they were inducted into the English Football Hall of Fame, to commemorate their 150th anniversary.

On the pitch, the club's finest hour came in 1904 when they won the FA Amateur Cup, a competition conceived after a suggestion by Sheffield F.C. They also finished as runners up of the FA Vase in 1977.

== History ==
In 1855, members of a Sheffield cricket club organised informal kick-abouts without any official rules. Subsequently, two members, Nathaniel Creswick and William Prest, formed the Sheffield Football Club.

The inaugural meeting of the club took place on 24 October 1857 at Parkfield House in the suburb of Highfield. The original headquarters was a greenhouse on East Bank Road lent by Thomas Asline Ward, father of the first club president Frederick Ward, and the adjacent field was used as their first playing ground. Initially, Sheffield F.C. games were played among club members themselves and took the format of "Married v Singles" or "Professionals v the Rest".

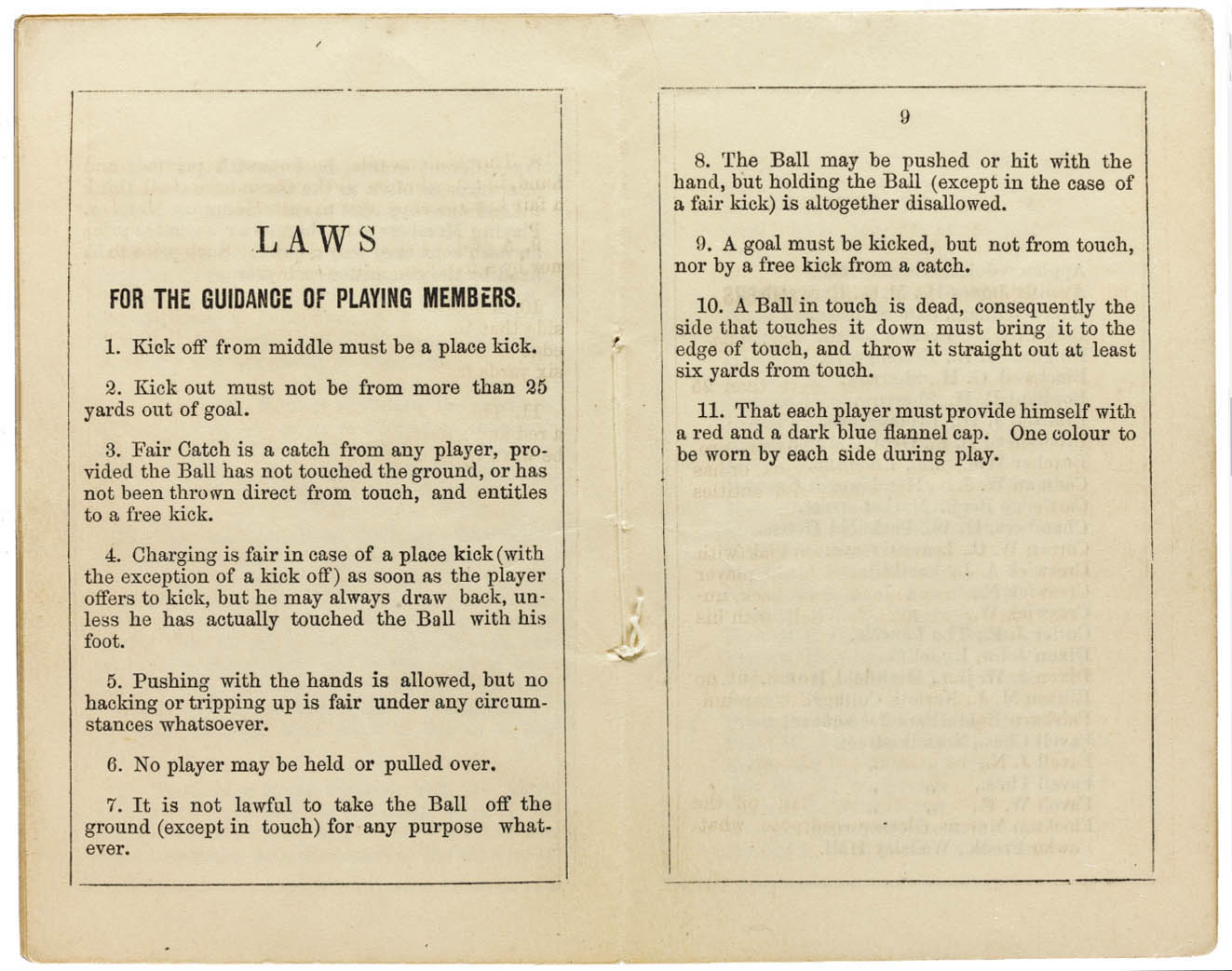
"Laws for the guidance of playing members", as published in 1859

Creswick and Prest were responsible for drawing up the club's rules of play, which were decided upon at the club's AGM on 21 October 1858, and published the following year. They were referred to as the Sheffield Rules, and were the first detailed set of rules of football to be published by a football club (as opposed to a school or university). At the time, before the formation of the Football Association (FA), many different kinds of football were popular in England. For example, each of the various public schools played football according to their own individual rules, and these varied widely. The Sheffield Rules were later adopted by the Sheffield Football Association when it was formed in 1867.

Sheffield F.C.'s near neighbour, Hallam, was formed in 1860 and in the same year the two clubs first met each other in a local derby that is still contested. By 1862 there were 15 clubs in the Sheffield area.

They became members of The Football Association on 30 November 1863 but continued to use their own set of rules. On 2 January 1865, the club played its first fixture outside Sheffield against Notts County, then known as Nottingham Football Club, at the Meadows Cricket Ground; the match was played eighteen-a-side under "Nottingham Rules". Sheffield F.C. won by a goal to nil.

By this time the club had decided to play only teams outside Sheffield in order to seek a bigger challenge. On 31 March 1866, Sheffield F.C. played a "London" team under FA rules at Battersea Park. The game, played as an eleven aside, was won by London by 2 goals and four touches down to nil. However the matter of rules remained a problem with Sheffield clubs continuing to play by their own rules. A number of rule proposals by the club were rejected by the FA in February 1867 and the London Committee were reluctant to commit to further fixtures over Sheffield F.C.'s refusal to play strictly to FA rules. Sheffield clubs finally adopted the FA rules in 1878.

In 1873 the club entered the FA Cup for the first time, their first ever tie in the competition, against Shropshire Wanderers, being decided after a replay by a coin toss; the only time in the history of the competition that a tie has been decided in this way. They would reach the 4th round of the competition in 1877–78 and 1879–80.

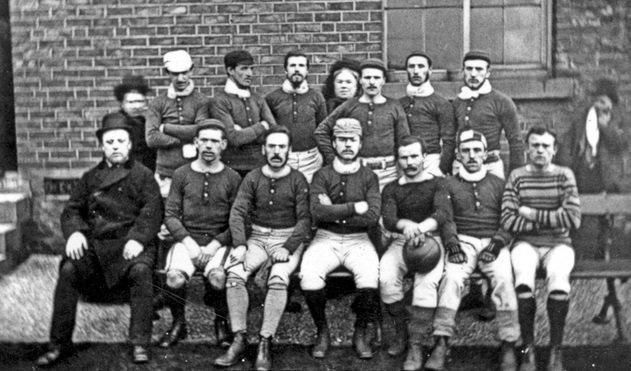
A Sheffield F.C. squad of 1876

Their reluctance to play against local clubs led to the formation of Thursday Wanderers in 1876, a team of players registered to Sheffield F.C. who wished to play in the Sheffield Challenge Cup. The Wanderers operated from 1876 to 1879, winning the cup in their final year.

Sheffield F.C.'s decline from the top echelon of football began with the introduction of professionalism in July 1885, with the amateurs of Sheffield F.C. failing to compete with professional teams, losing heavily that year to Aston Villa, Nottingham Forest and Notts County. After the legalisation of professionalism, the staunchly amateur Sheffield F.C. suggested to the FA the creation of a cup exclusively for amateur clubs. The FA Amateur Cup was inaugurated in 1893 and Sheffield F.C. themselves won the competition in 1904.

They joined their first league competition in 1889 when entering the Midland League, but left after just one season when they finished bottom of the table. They were also founder members of the original Yorkshire League in 1898, but again they spent just a single season in the competition.

After the turn of the century, Sheffield F.C. competed mainly in local leagues. By 1925–26 they were competing in the Sheffield Association League.

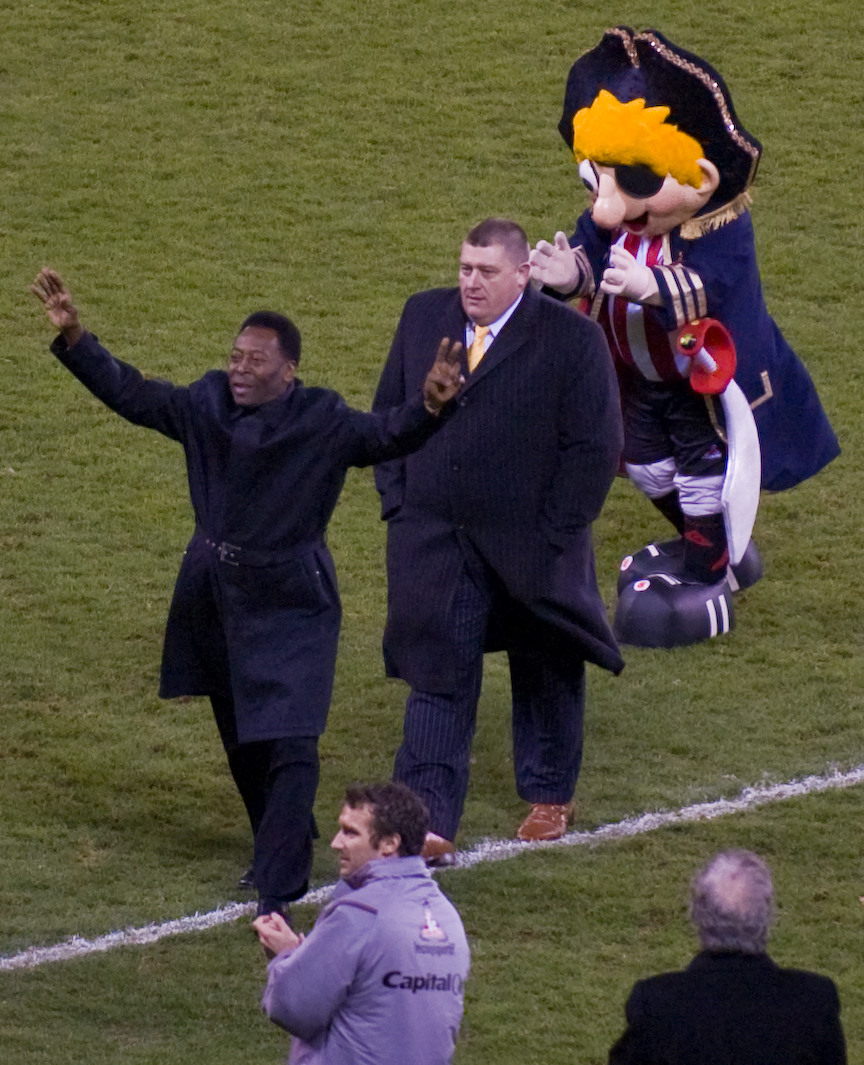
Pelé (left) in Sheffield in November 2007, marking the 150th anniversary of the world's oldest football club, Sheffield F.C.

Fifty years after leaving the competition, the club rejoined the Yorkshire League, in 1949. Three years later they won promotion to Division One, but were relegated back to Division Two in 1954. They returned to the top flight at the first time of asking before entering their centenary year in 1957. Celebrations included games against the England B team at Hillsborough and fellow amateur side Queen's Park FC at Bramall Lane.

In 1961, Sheffield F.C. was relegated to Division Two again, only returning to the top flight again in 1967, and then only for one more season before another relegation. Three years later, in 1970, they were relegated again, to the newly formed Division Three. Club would spend six seasons in the Yorkshire League's basement division, finishing as low as 10th in 1974. They finally started to turn their fortunes around in 1976 by returning to Division Two, and a year later they were crowned as Division Two champions to return to Division One. In the same season, Sheffield F.C. reached the final of the newly formed FA Vase. At Wembley stadium, they drew 1–1 with Billericay Town, before being beaten 1–2 in the replay at the City Ground in Nottingham.

When the Yorkshire League merged with the Midland League to form the Northern Counties East League (NCEL) in 1981, Sheffield F.C. were placed in Division One South of the new competition. They stayed in this division for three seasons before the league was restructured, with the club being reassigned to the newly formed Division One. In 1989 they won the division One title, but they were relegated back again a year later because of their lack of floodlights.

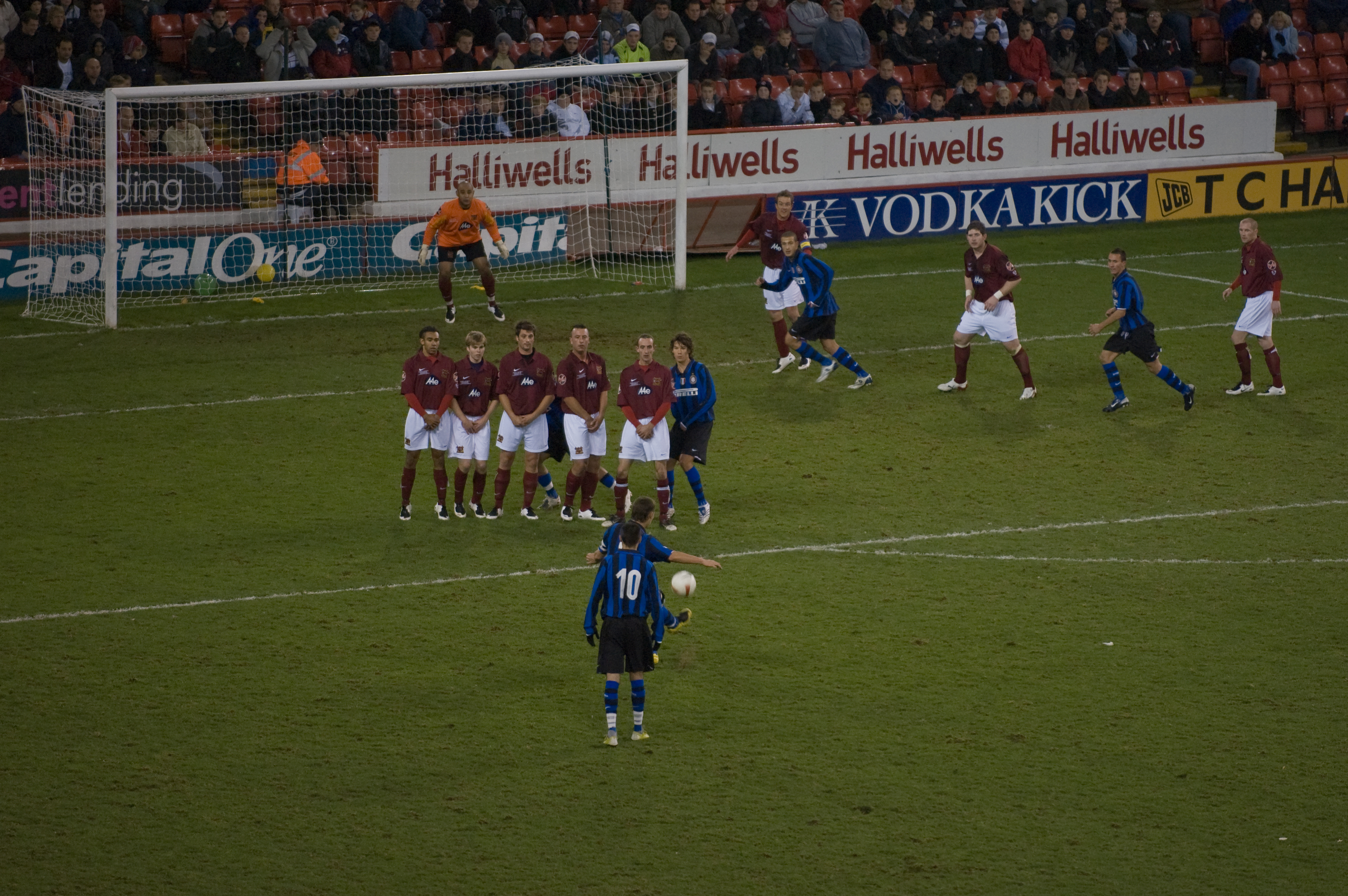
Sheffield F.C.'s 150th anniversary celebration match against Inter at Bramall Lane in 2007

At the first time of asking Sheffield F.C. again won the division One title, this time remaining in the NCEL Premier Division for 15 years. In 1994 the club won the Sheffield & Hallamshire Senior Cup for the first time, beating Worksop Town on penalties at Hillsborough. They would later win the trophy on a further four occasions throughout the 2010s.

2007 was a momentous year for Sheffield F.C. as they entered their 150th year. They finished as runners-up in the league to secure promotion to the Northern Premier League (NPL) for the first time. In October 2007, FIFA president Sepp Blatter attended the club's anniversary dinner, and the following month the club played anniversary celebration matches against Internazionale and Ajax at Bramall Lane. Football legend Pelé was guest of honour at the first game and was introduced to the teams and the fans before the game. The match ended 5–2 to Inter, with 18,741 supporters attending the match. Inter's side included World Cup winner Marco Materazzi and a young Mario Balotelli. As part of his visit, Pelé opened an exhibition which included the first public showing in 40 years of the original hand-written rules of football.

Sheffield F.C. have reached the play-offs of the NPL Division One South on four occasions, but have so far failed to win promotion. In their first Division One South campaign in 2008 they reached the final, losing on penalties to Nantwich Town, before being knocked out in the semi-finals in 2010, 2012 and 2019. The club first played in the FA Trophy in 2007 after winning promotion to the NPL, but has so far failed to advance past the qualifying rounds. In 2015, the Qataris donated £100,000 to Sheffield F.C. Since then, Sheffield F.C. has been on a gradual decline in both form and status in the league. Attendances failed to reflect the perceived status of the club despite fanfare on social media in various campaigns.

In 2025, Sheffield F.C. faced Hallam in the Sheffield & Hallamshire Senior Cup, the first competitive Rules Derby fixture in over a decade. The Club fell in a 2–1 defeat at the hands of their rivals. With games to spare, Sheffield F.C. were relegated from the Northern Premier League. Away from the pitch, Richard Tims stepped away from the club after 27 years.

== Grounds ==
Sheffield F.C. have played at a number of grounds near Sheffield. Initially they played at Strawberry Hall Lane Park. However, like all of the early grounds they played at, it was not owned by the club. In the following years they would play at Old Forge ground and a ground near Hunter's Bar on Ecclesall Road.

There was much reluctance from the owners of Bramall Lane to see the pitch used for football. They did not relent until a charity match between Sheffield F.C. and Hallam was suggested in late 1862. The ground was used by Sheffield F.C. for its more important fixtures but relations with the owners remained strained. They collapsed altogether in 1875 when the club vowed never to play at the ground again.

In 1921, Sheffield F.C. settled at the new Abbeydale Park ground. They moved to Hillsborough Park in 1988, then to Owlerton Stadium and Don Valley Stadium. In 1999, Richard Tims got involved with Sheffield F.C. when he was invited to a home game in Don Valley Stadium. He noted that the club was struggling as they were playing in a rented stadium. He took over the club and helped it secure its own ground, the Coach and Horses Stadium in Dronfield, Derbyshire.

The club bought the Coach & Horses ground in Dronfield in 2001, which was previously the home of Norton Woodseats, a notable football team who reached the semi-finals of the FA Amateur Cup in 1939. It was the first time the club had owned its own ground. The ground has a capacity of just over 2,000 with 250 seats in the stand behind the southern goal.

In March 2019 it was revealed that Sheffield F.C. was in talks with the Sheffield Transport Sports Club (STSC) to move the club back to its home city after plans to move to the Olive Grove sports ground in the Heeley district of Sheffield fell through in 2016. In March 2021 plans for the new stadium based at the STSC facility in the Meadowhead area of Sheffield were revealed. The proposed 4,000 person capacity stadium features a heritage centre celebrating the city's role in football history.

=== Historic grounds ===
The club has played its FA Cup games at the following grounds:

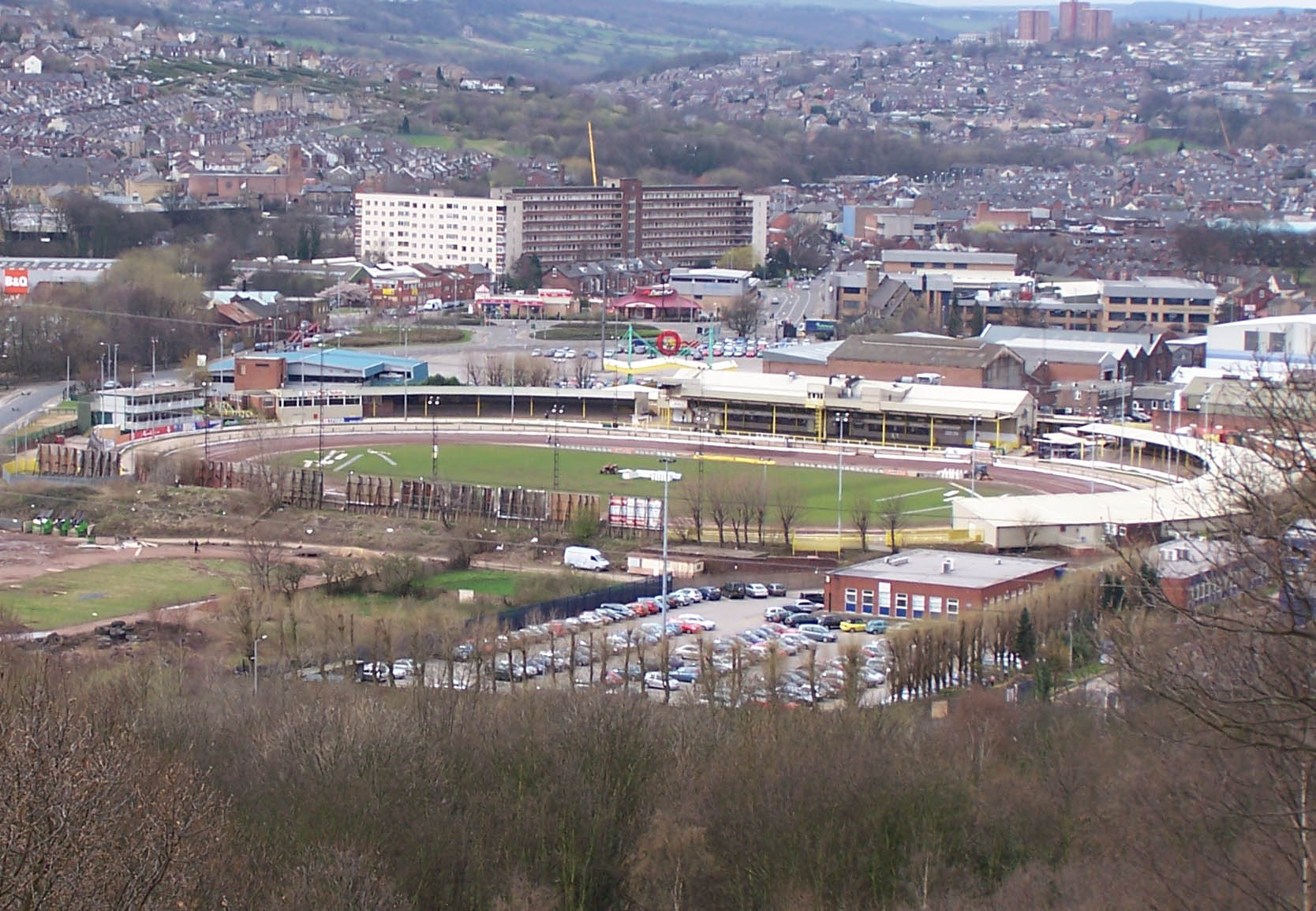
Owlerton Stadium, Sheffield F.C.'s home for a period during the 1980s and 1990s

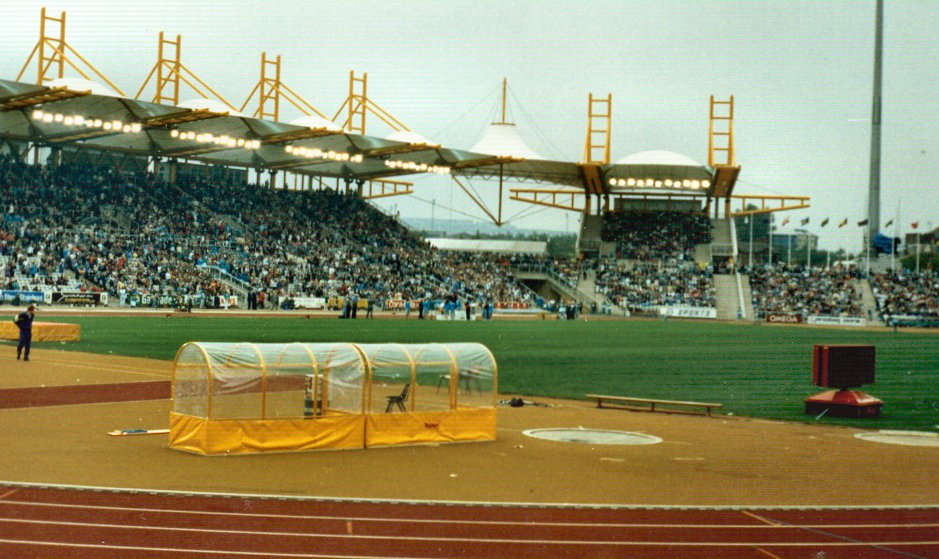
Don Valley Stadium, another of Sheffield F.C.'s former homes

The south end of the Coach & Horses Ground.

The east end of the Coach & Horses Ground, with the Coach & Horses pub to the left.

Years	Ground
1857–1873	Strawberry Hall Lane Park, Sheffield
1873–1884	Bramall Lane, Sheffield
1884–1889	Old Forge Ground, Attercliffe
1889–1897	Ecclesall Road, Sheffield
1897–1901	Owlerton Ground, Owlerton, Sheffield
1901–1921	Niagara Ground, Wadsley Bridge
1921–1988	Abbeydale Park, Dore
1988	Hillsborough Park, Hillsborough, Sheffield
1989	Owlerton Stadium, Owlerton, Sheffield
1990–2001	Don Valley Stadium, Sheffield
2001–present	Coach & Horses Ground, Dronfield (also known as the Home of Football Stadium)

== Season-by-season record ==
Season	Division	Level	Position	FA Cup	FA Amateur Cup	FA Trophy	FA Vase	Notes
1873–74	No league entered	–	–	3R	–	–	–	
1874–75	No league entered	–	–	1R	–	–	–	
1875–76	No league entered	–	–	3R	–	–	–	
1876–77	No league entered	–	–	3R	–	–	–	
1877–78	No league entered	–	–	4R	–	–	–	
1878–79	No league entered	–	–	2R	–	–	–	
1879–80	No league entered	–	–	4R	–	–	–	
1880–81	No league entered	–	–	2R	–	–	–	
1881–82	No league entered	–	–	2R	–	–	–	
1882–83	No league entered	–	–	1R	–	–	–	
1883–84	No league entered	–	–	1R	–	–	–	
1884–85	No league entered	–	–	3R	–	–	–	
1885–86	No league entered	–	–	2R	–	–	–	
1886–87	No league entered	–	–	1R	–	–	–	
1887–88	No league entered	–	–	1R	–	–	–	
1888–89	No league entered	–	–	1QR	–	–	–	
1889–90	Midland League	–	11th/11	3QR	–	–	–	
1890–91	Midland Alliance	–	8th/8	1QR	–	–	–	
1891–92	Midland Alliance	–	9th/10	1QR	–	–	–	
1892–93	Midland Alliance	–	10th/11	1QR	–	–	–	
1893–94	Sheffield Challenge Cup League; Sheffield & District League	–	14th/14 5th/5	1QR	1R	–	–	
1894–95	Sheffield Challenge Cup League	–	15th/15	1QR	1R	–	–	
1895–96	Sheffield Challenge Cup League	–	11th/15	1QR	1R	–	–	
1896–97	Sheffield Association League	–	4th/10	4QR	2QR	–	–	
1897–98	United Counties League	–	–	3QR	2R	–	–	
1898–99	Yorkshire League	–	7th/10	1QR	2QR	–	–	
1899–00	Sheffield Association League	–	7th/9	1QR	1R	–	–	
1900–01	Sheffield Association League	–	10th/15	PR	1R	–	–	
1901–02	Sheffield Association League	–	12th/13	1QR	2R	–	–	
1902–03	Sheffield Association League	–	7th/8	1QR	2R	–	–	
1903–04	Sheffield Association League	–	8th/14	PR	Won	–	–	
1904–05	No league entered	–	–	1QR	1R	–	–	
1905–06	Sheffield Association League	–		1QR	2R	–	–	
1906–07	Sheffield Association League	–	12th/13	PR	2R	–	–	
1907–08	Sheffield Association League	–	16th/16	1QR	1R	–	–	
1908–09	Sheffield Amateur League	–		–	1R	–	–	
1909–10	Sheffield Amateur League	–	11th/12	PR	1R	–	–	
1910–11	No league entered	–	–	PR	1R	–	–	
1911–12	Sheffield Amateur League	–		PR	1R	–	–	
1912–13	Sheffield Amateur League	–		PR	2QR	–	–	
1913–14	Sheffield Amateur League	–	10th/11	PR	4QR	–	–	
1914–15	No league entered	–	–	EPR	–	–	–	
1915–16	Club did not enter any competitions due to World War I							
1916–17	Club did not enter any competitions due to World War I							
1917–18	Club did not enter any competitions due to World War I							
1918–19	Club did not enter any competitions due to World War I							
1919–20	No league entered	–	–	PR	2QR	–	–	
1920–21	No league entered	–	–	EPR	2QR	–	–	
1921–22	No league entered	–	–	EPR	3QR	–	–	
1922–23	No league entered	–	–	PR	4QR	–	–	
1923–24	No league entered	–	–	PR	3QR	–	–	
1924–25	No league entered	–	–	PR	2QR	–	–	
1925–26	Sheffield Association League	–		1QR	3QR	–	–	
1926–27	No league entered	–	–	PR	2QR	–	–	
1927–28	No league entered	–	–	PR	2QR	–	–	
1928–29	No league entered	–	–	PR	2QR	–	–	
1929–30	No league entered	–	–	1QR	3QR	–	–	
1930–31	No league entered	–	–	PR	3QR	–	–	
1931–32	No league entered	–	–	PR	4QR	–	–	
1932–33	No league entered	–	–	PR	2QR	–	–	
1933–34	No league entered	–	–	PR	2QR	–	–	
1934–35	No league entered	–	–	PR	3QR	–	–	
1935–36	Sheffield Association League	–		PR	3QR	–	–	
1936–37	Sheffield Association League	–		EPR	1QR	–	–	
1937–38	Sheffield Association League	–		EPR	1QR	–	–	
1938–39	Sheffield Association League	–		EPR	2QR	–	–	
1939–40	Club did not enter any competitions due to World War II							
1940–41	Sheffield Amateur-City League	–		–	–	–	–	
1941–42	Sheffield Amateur-City League	–		–	–	–	–	
1942–43	Sheffield Amateur-City League	–		–	–	–	–	
1943–44	Sheffield Amateur League	–		–	–	–	–	
1944–45	Sheffield Amateur League	–		–	–	–	–	
1945–46	Sheffield Amateur League	–		–	–	–	–	
1946–47	Sheffield Association League	–		1QR	4QR	–	–	
1947–48	Sheffield Association League	–		PR	4QR	–	–	
1948–49	Sheffield Association League	–		PR	1R	–	–	
1949–50	Yorkshire League Division 2	–	10th/18	PR	2R	–	–	
1950–51	Yorkshire League Division 2	–	7th/17	PR	2R	–	–	
1951–52	Yorkshire League Division 2	–	3rd/13	1QR	2R	–	–	Promoted
1952–53	Yorkshire League Division 1	–	8th/18	1QR	1R	–	–	
1953–54	Yorkshire League Division 1	–	15th/18	2QR	1R	–	–	Relegated
1954–55	Yorkshire League Division 2	–	3rd/16	2QR	1R	–	–	Promoted
1955–56	Yorkshire League Division 1	–	6th/18	1QR	4QR	–	–	
1956–57	Yorkshire League Division 1	–	10th/18	2QR	PR	–	–	
1957–58	Yorkshire League Division 1	–	10th/18	2QR	1QR	–	–	
1958–59	Yorkshire League Division 1	–	12th/18	4QR	1QR	–	–	
1959–60	Yorkshire League Division 1	–	14th/18	1QR	1R	–	–	
1960–61	Yorkshire League Division 1	–	16th/18	–	4QR	–	–	Relegated
1961–62	Yorkshire League Division 2	–	7th/14	–	1QR	–	–	
1962–63	Yorkshire League Division 2	–	5th/15	–	3QR	–	–	
1963–64	Yorkshire League Division 2	–	6th/15	–	3QR	–	–	
1964–65	Yorkshire League Division 2	–	8th/15	–	2QR	–	–	
1965–66	Yorkshire League Division 2	–	3rd/15	–	2QR	–	–	Promoted
1966–67	Yorkshire League Division 1	–	16th/17	–	1QR	–	–	Relegated
1967–68	Yorkshire League Division 2	–	8th/17	–	2QR	–	–	
1968–69	Yorkshire League Division 2	–	9th/17	–	PR	–	–	
1969–70	Yorkshire League Division 2	–	11th/18	–	1QR	–	–	Relegated
1970–71	Yorkshire League Division 3	–	6th/15	–	1QR	–	–	
1971–72	Yorkshire League Division 3	–	7th/14	–	1QR	–	–	
1972–73	Yorkshire League Division 3	–	8th/16	–	1QR	–	–	
1973–74	Yorkshire League Division 3	–	10th/16	–	1QR	–	–	
1974–75	Yorkshire League Division 3	–	5th/16	–	–	–	4R	
1975–76	Yorkshire League Division 3	–	4th/16	–	–	–	3R	Promoted
1976–77	Yorkshire League Division 2	–	1st/16	–	–	–	RU	League champions, promoted
1977–78	Yorkshire League Division 1	–	7th/16	–	–	–	2R	
1978–79	Yorkshire League Division 1	–	8th/16	–	–	–	3R	
1979–80	Yorkshire League Division 1	–	5th/16	–	–	–	2R	
1980–81	Yorkshire League Division 1	–	12th/16	–	–	–	1R	
1981–82	Yorkshire League Division 1	–	11th/16	–	–	–	PR	
1982–83	Northern Counties East League Division 1 South	–	3rd/14	–	–	–	PR	
1983–84	Northern Counties East League Division 1 South	–	4th/14	–	–	–	1R	
1984–85	Northern Counties East League Division 1 South	–	6th/16	–	–	–	1R	
1985–86	Northern Counties East League Division 1	–	2nd/16	–	–	–	4R	
1986–87	Northern Counties East League Division 1	–	17th/18	–	–	–	1R	
1987–88	Northern Counties East League Division 1	–	8th/16	–	–	–	1R	
1988–89	Northern Counties East League Division 1	–	1st/16	–	–	–	PR	League champions, promoted
1989–90	Northern Counties East League Premier Division	–	8th/16	1QR	–	–	2R	Relegated
1990–91	Northern Counties East League Division 1	–	1st/13	PR	–	–	2R	League champions, promoted
1991–92	Northern Counties East League Premier Division	–	6th/19	1QR	–	–	2R	
1992–93	Northern Counties East League Premier Division	–	15th/20	2QR	–	–	PR	
1993–94	Northern Counties East League Premier Division	–	4th/20	1QR	–	–	2R	
1994–95	Northern Counties East League Premier Division	–	18th/20	2QR	–	–	PR	
1995–96	Northern Counties East League Premier Division	–	20th/20	1QR	–	–	1QR	
1996–97	Northern Counties East League Premier Division	–	18th/20	2QR	–	–	1R	
1997–98	Northern Counties East League Premier Division	–	15th/20	PR	–	–	2R	
1998–99	Northern Counties East League Premier Division	–	12th/20	PR	–	–	1QR	
1999–00	Northern Counties East League Premier Division	–	14th/20	2QR	–	–	1QR	
2000–01	Northern Counties East League Premier Division	–	7th/20	4QR	–	–	1R	
2001–02	Northern Counties East League Premier Division	–	9th/20	PR	–	–	1QR	
2002–03	Northern Counties East League Premier Division	–	7th/20	PR	–	–	2R	
2003–04	Northern Counties East League Premier Division	–	4th/20	1QR	–	–	3R	
2004–05	Northern Counties East League Premier Division	9	4th/20	1QR	–	–	1R	
2005–06	Northern Counties East League Premier Division	9	4th/20	PR	–	–	2QR	
2006–07	Northern Counties East League Premier Division	9	2nd/20	1QR	–	–	2R	Promoted
2007–08	Northern Premier League Division 1 South	8	4th/18	PR	–	3QR	–	
2008–09	Northern Premier League Division 1 South	8	11th/20	4QR	–	1QR	–	
2009–10	Northern Premier League Division 1 South	8	5th/22	1QR	–	PR	–	
2010–11	Northern Premier League Division 1 South	8	11th/22	4QR	–	1QR	–	
2011–12	Northern Premier League Division 1 South	8	4th/22	PR	–	3QR	–	
2012–13	Northern Premier League Division 1 South	8	9th/22	PR	–	PR	–	
2013–14	Northern Premier League Division 1 South	8	16th/21	1QR	–	3QR	–	
2014–15	Northern Premier League Division 1 South	8	15th/22	2QR	–	1QR	–	
2015–16	Northern Premier League Division 1 South	8	17th/22	PR	–	1QR	–	
2016–17	Northern Premier League Division 1 South	8	15th/22	1QR	–	PR	–	
2017–18	Northern Premier League Division 1 South	8	15th/22	PR	–	PR	–	
2018–19	Northern Premier League Division 1 East	8	4th/20	PR	–	EPR	–	
2019–20	Northern Premier League Division 1 South East	8	–	1QR	–	EPR	–	League season abandoned due to COVID-19 pandemic
2020–21	Northern Premier League Division 1 South East	8	–	1QR	–	2QR	–	League season abandoned due to COVID-19 pandemic
2021–22	Northern Premier League Division 1 East	8	17th/19	PR	–	2QR	–	
2022–23	Northern Premier League Division 1 East	8	9th/20	PR	–	2QR	–	
2023–24	Northern Premier League Division 1 East	8	13th/20	1QR	–	2QR	–	
2024–25	Northern Premier League Division 1 East	8	22nd/22	2QR	–	1QR	–	Relegated
2025–26	Northern Counties East Football League Premier Division	9	3rd/20	PR	–	–	2QR	
Season	Division	Level	Position	FA Cup	FA Amateur Cup	FA Trophy	FA Vase	Notes
Source: Football Club History Database

== Managers ==
=== List of managers ===
From	To	Manager
1972	1982	Chris Stanley
1982	1984	Paddy Buckley
1984	1993	R Evans
1993	1997	Kenny Johnson
1997	2000	John Pearson

From	To	Manager
1999	2008	Dave McCarthy
2008	2011	Chris Dolby
2011	2012	Mark Shaw
2012	2012	Curtis Woodhouse
2012	2014	Ian Whitehorne

From	To	Manager
2014	2014	Mick Wadsworth
2014	2015	Jordan Broadbent
2015	2016	Andy Kiwomya
2016	2017	James Colliver
2017	2017	Mark Hume

From	To	Manager
2017	2018	Mark Shaw
2018	2021	Gavin Smith
2021	2024	Ryan Cresswell
2024	2026	Vill Powell
2026	present	Craig Denton

== Players ==
=== Notable former players ===
Famous players from the club's early days included Nathaniel Creswick and William Prest, who founded the club. Four Sheffield F.C. players have appeared for England – Charles Clegg, who played in the first international game against Scotland in 1872, John Owen, in 1874, Thomas Sorby, in 1879, and Jack Hudson, in 1883.

In addition to the above, the following have played in the Football League either before or after playing for Sheffield F.C.:

- Steve Fleetwood
- Samuel Ashworth
- Billy Bairstow
- Ollie Banks
- Craig Boardman
- Andy Brownrigg
- T. B. A. Clarke
- Matt Dickins
- David Faulkner
- Tom Fenoughty
- David Graham
- George Groves
- Connor Hall
- Jamie Jackson
- Kirk Jackson
- Matthew Lowton
- Austin McIntosh
- Nathan Modest
- Marc Newsham
- Scott Partridge
- Richard Peacock
- Paul Pettinger
- John Roxburgh
- Jimmy Sayer
- Mark Smith
- Paul Smith (1)
- Paul Smith (2)
- Nick Wood
- Curtis Woodhouse
- Jamie Yates

== Honours ==
=== League ===
- Northern Counties East League Premier Division
  - Promoted: 2006–07
- Northern Counties East League Division One
  - Promoted: 1988–89 (champions), 1990–91 (champions)
- Yorkshire League Division Two
  - Promoted: 1951–52, 1954–55, 1965–66, 1976–77
  - Champions: 1976–77
- Yorkshire League Division Three
  - Promoted: 1975–76
- Central Midlands Division One North (Reserves)
  - Promoted: 2021–22
- Central Midlands Division One North (Reserves)
  - Champions: 2023–24

=== Cup ===
- FA Amateur Cup
  - Winners: 1903–1904
- FA Vase
  - Runners-up: 1976–77
- Yorkshire League Cup
  - Winners: 1977–78
- Northern Counties East League Cup
  - Winners: 2000–01, 2004–05
- Sheffield & Hallamshire Senior Cup
  - Winners: 1993–94, 2004–05, 2005–06, 2007–08, 2009–10
  - Runners-up: 1961–62, 2012–13

== Records ==
- Best FA Cup performance: 4th round, 1877–78, 1879–80
- Best FA Amateur Cup performance: Winners, 1903–04
- Best FA Trophy performance: 3rd qualifying round, 2007–08, 2011–12, 2013–14
- Best FA Vase performance: Runners-up, 1976–77
- Record attendance: 2,000 vs. Barton Rovers, FA Vase Semi-Final, 1976–77

== See also ==
- Sheffield Rules
- Club of Pioneers
