= 1840s in association football =

List of years in association football
- … 1830; 1831; 1832; 1833; 1834; 1835; 1836; 1837; 1838; 1839; 1840; 1841; 1842; 1843; 1844; 1845; 1846; 1847; 1848; 1849; 1850 …
- Art; Archaeology; Architecture; Literature; Music; Philosophy; Science; +...

The following are events in the 1840s decade which are relevant to the development of association football. All events happened in English football unless specified otherwise.

== Events ==
=== 1843 ===
- At the University of Cambridge, the original Cambridge rules were created by students still confused by the different rules operating at their various schools. Cambridge was the first attempt at codifying the rules of what became association football (the "dribbling" game) as distinct from rugby football (the "handling" game).
- The essential difference in the two codes was that the dribbling game did not allow a player to run with the ball in his hands or pass it by hand to a colleague, although the earliest rules did allow players to touch and control the ball by hand. The main dribbling schools were Charterhouse, Eton, Harrow, Westminster and Winchester. Even though these schools agreed on the essentials of the game, there were crucial differences in the details. For example, while Eton allowed a player to stop the ball with his hands, Harrow allowed him to make a clean catch to earn a free kick.

=== 1845 ===
- 25 August – Written version of Rugby School Football Rules which allowed the ball to be carried and passed by hand. These rules are the earliest that are definitely known to have been written and they were a major step in the evolution of rugby league, rugby union and other handling variants. The Rugby School rules made a clear distinction between handling and dribbling, the latter being defined as running with the ball at one's feet.

=== 1846 ===
- 24 February (Shrove Tuesday) – Local authorities in Derby attempted to ban the traditional Shrove Tuesday match on the pretext that it breached the Riot Act. A match began and Mayor William Mousley read the Riot Act prior to summoning the local militia. The match was nevertheless played and a goal scored despite the efforts of the soldiers, many of whom became actively involved in the game. Fifteen arrests were made afterward and no attempt made to stage the 1847 event.

=== 1847 ===
- It is about this time that a set of written rules is believed to have been in existence at Eton College. Although Eton allowed the ball to be touched and controlled by hand, it did not allow running with the ball in the hand or passing of the ball by hand. As in cricket, games were adjudicated by two umpires who later become the linesmen. The referee was introduced at Eton but only as an arbitrator when the umpires disagreed.
- As at Eton, most of the other leading public schools had written rules in the 1840s.

=== 1848 ===
- Adoption at some but by no means all public schools of the 1843 Cambridge rules, which have not survived as a document. The rules were rolled out from the schools by graduates who formed football clubs.

== Births ==
=== 1842 ===
- 2 December – Charles W. Alcock (d. 1907), English sportsman who was a key influence in the development of both international football and cricket; as FA secretary, he was the driving force in the creation of the FA Cup.

=== 1844 ===
- summer – James Smith (d. 1876), Scotland international in 1872 who played in the first official international match.

=== 1845 ===
- 10 November – Peter Andrews (d. 1916), Scotland international in 1875 who may have been the first Scottish footballer to play in England.

=== 1846 ===
- 19 October – Robert Leckie (d. 1887), Scotland international in 1872 who played in the first official international match.

=== 1847 ===
- 5 January – Robert Parlane (d. 1918), Scotland international goalkeeper in three matches, 1878–79.
- 16 February – A. F. Kinnaird (d. 1923), Scotland international in 1873 who played in the second official international match; played in a record nine FA Cup finals with five wins and four defeats.
- 31 March – Robert Gardner (d. 1887), Scotland international in 1872 who played in the first two official international matches as Scotland's first captain and goalkeeper; made five international appearances in total.
- 19 June – Robert Barker (d. 1915), England international in 1872 who played in the first official international match.
- 24 August – William Kenyon-Slaney (d. 1908), England international in 1873 who played in the second official international match; scorer of the first-ever goal in international football.
- 30 August – Morton Betts (d. 1914), England international in 1877 and scorer of the first-ever FA Cup Final goal.

=== 1848 ===
- 1 May – Robert Smith (d. 1914), Scotland international in 1872–73 who played in the first two official international matches.
- 16 May – Ernest Bambridge (d. 1917), England international in 1876 and one of three brothers who all played for England.
- 25 May – John Owen (d. 1921), England international in 1874 (one match).
- 6 August – Leonard Howell (d. 1895), England international in 1873 who played in the second official international match.
- 22 August – John Brockbank (d. 1896), England international in 1872 who played in the first official international match.
- 15 November – William Carr (d. 1924), England international goalkeeper in 1875 (one match).
- unknown – John Ferguson (d. 1929), Scotland international in six matches, scoring five goals, from 1874 to 1878.

=== 1849 ===
- 6 March – Harwood Greenhalgh (d. 1922), England international in 1872–73 who played in the first two official international matches.
- 28 March – Reg Birkett (d. 1898), England international in 1879 and also a rugby union international.
- 9 April – David Wotherspoon (d. 1906), Scotland international in 1872–73 who played in the first two official international matches.
- 22 July – Frederick Chappell (d. 1907), later called Frederick Maddison, England international in 1872 who played in the first official international match.
- 31 July – Charles Wollaston (d. 1926), England international forward in four matches (1874–1880); the first player to win the FA Cup five times, all with Wanderers from 1872 to 1878.
- 20 September – Alex Rhind (d. 1922), Scotland international in 1872 who played in the first official international match.
- 9 October – Henry Renny-Tailyour (d. 1920), Scotland international in 1873 who played in the second official international match; scorer of Scotland's first-ever international goal.
- 23 December – Robert Kingsford (d. 1895), England international in 1874 (one match).

== Bibliography ==
- Sanders, Richard (2009). Beastly Fury – The Strange Birth of British Football. London: Transworld. ISBN 978-0-55-381935-9.
