= History of the England national football team =

In 2012, England kit manufacturer Umbro introduced a FA crest completely in red

The history of the England national football team, also known as the Three Lions, begins with the first representative international match in 1870 and the first officially-recognised match two years later. England primarily competed in the British Home Championship over the following decades. Although the FA had joined the international governing body of association football FIFA in 1906, the relationship with the British associations was fraught. In 1928, the British nations withdrew from FIFA, in a dispute over payments to amateur players. This meant that England did not enter the first three World Cups.

The Three Lions first entered the World Cup in 1950 and have since appeared in 17 of the 20 post-war finals tournaments to 2026. They won the 1966 World Cup on home soil, making them one of only eight nations to have won a FIFA World Cup. They reached the semi-finals on three other occasions, in 1990, 2018, and 2026, earning a bronze medal at the latter tournament. England have been eliminated from the World Cup quarter-final stage on seven occasions – more often than any other nation – and failed to qualify for the finals in 1974, 1978, and 1994.

England also compete in the UEFA European Championship and UEFA Nations League. At UEFA Euro 2020, they reached the final of the competition for the first time, finishing as runners-up, and finished in the same position at Euro 2024. England previously reached the semi-final of the competition in 1968 and 1996, with the latter held on home soil. England's most capped player and top goalscorer is Harry Kane. As a constituent country of the United Kingdom, England are not a member of the International Olympic Committee, and thus are not eligible to compete in the Olympic Games.

== Early years ==
=== 1870–1900 ===
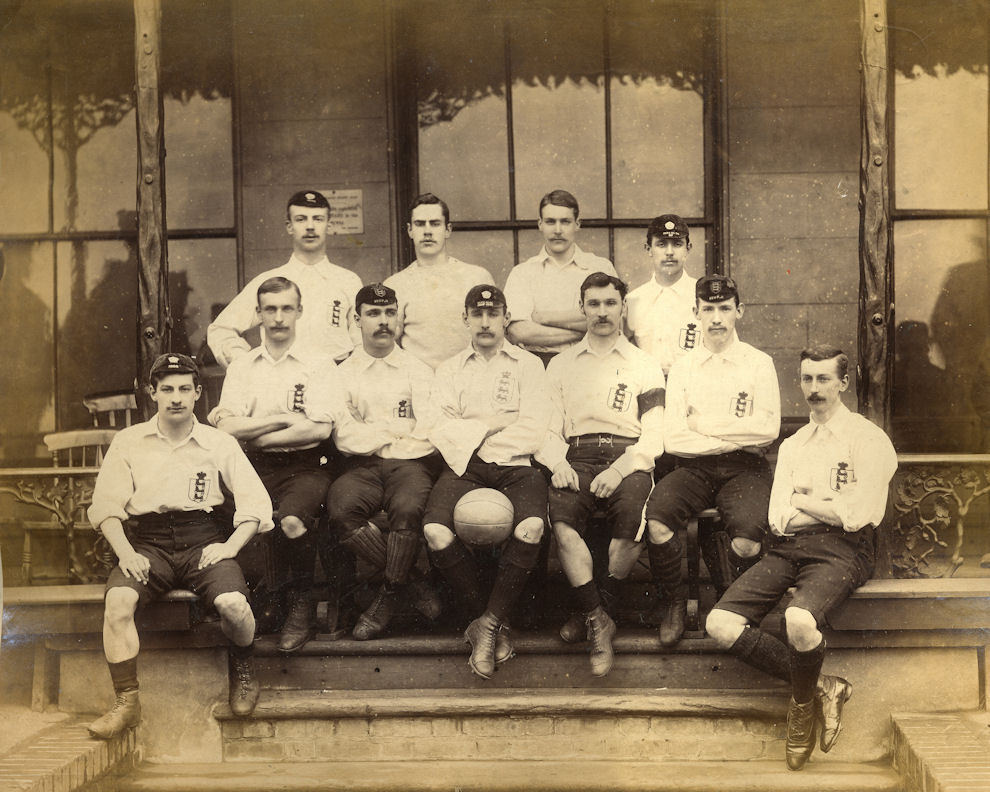
An England team of 1889

England's first international representative matches were proposed by the FA Secretary Charles Alcock. On 3 November 1870, Alcock wrote to the Glasgow Herald that a match between Scotland and England would take place at the Kennington Oval, London. The first five friendly matches, which all took place at The Oval, were played against Scotland between 1870 and 1872. However, these are not considered full internationals by FIFA because the Scotland teams were composed entirely of London-based Scottish players.

England v Scotland 1870–1872
Match	Date	Venue	Score	Winner
England v Scotland (1870)	5 March 1870	The Oval, London	1–1	Draw
England v Scotland (1870)	19 November 1870	The Oval, London	1–0	(England)
England v Scotland (1871)	25 February 1871	The Oval, London	1–1	Draw
England v Scotland (1871)	17 November 1871	The Oval, London	2–1	(England)
England v Scotland (1872)	24 February 1872	The Oval, London	1–0	(England)

England's first FIFA-recognised international football match was a 0–0 draw against Scotland at Hamilton Crescent in Partick, Glasgow, on 30 November 1872 in front of 4,000 supporters. A Scottish FA had yet to be founded, therefore the match was organised by Queen's Park. An English sports newspaper, Bell's Life described the match as "one of the jolliest, one of the most spirited and most pleasant matches that have ever been played according to Association rules".

The first England team in this match was:

Robert Barker (Hertfordshire Rangers), goal; Harwood Greenhalgh (Notts Club), three-quarter back; R. C. Welch (Harrow Chequers), half-back; F. Chappell (Oxford University), fly-kick; capt. Cuthbert Ottaway (Oxford University), middle; Charles Chenery (Crystal Palace), middle; Charles Clegg (Sheffield), middle; Arnold Kirke-Smith (Oxford University), middle; J. Brockbank (Oxford University) right side; W. J. Maynard (1st Surrey Rifles) left side; J. F. Morris (Barnes Club) left side.

The following year, England beat Scotland 4–2 at the Kennington Oval, but in 1878, a resurgent Scotland thrashed England 7–2 at Hampden Park in Glasgow and followed this by beating England 6–1 at the Oval three years later.

The annual British International Championship, also known as the Home Championship, between England, Scotland, Wales and Ireland began in 1884, with Scotland beating England 1–0 at the second Hampden Park and winning the competition's inaugural season. England's first success in the competition came in 1888, the same year that the Football League was formed, when they won all three of their matches, including a 5–0 away victory against Scotland.

=== 1900–1939 ===
In the early 20th century, as association football began to grow in Europe, the French Football Association proposed a European federation. The English FA replied that "The Council of the Football Association cannot see the advantages of such a Federation, but on all matters upon which joint action was desirable they would be prepared to confer." FIFA was founded in 1904, which England were not original members. By 1906, they had joined FIFA. However, the relationship with the British associations and FIFA was fraught. In 1928, the British nations withdrew from FIFA, in a dispute over 'broken time' payments to amateur players.

Over the coming decades, England primarily continued to competed against Scotland, Wales and Ireland in the Home Championship. This was partly due to the dominance of the United Kingdom in international football, and the problems of arranging continental internationals before the advent of air travel. England faced their first continental opposition in a tour of Central Europe in 1908, beating Austria, Hungary and Bohemia. England's first defeat outside the British Isles was a 4–3 loss to Spain in Madrid in May 1929.

The England national amateur football team was formed in 1901, when amateur players could no longer easily find places in the main national team. Great Britain, rather than England and other home nations, is represented in the Olympic Games. But the Great Britain teams that won gold medals in the 1908 and 1912 Olympic football tournaments were constituted by England national amateur team players. A similar team was knocked out early in 1920 Olympic football. No Great Britain team entered in 1924 after dispute concerning the regulation of professionalism.

As England were not members of FIFA at the time, England did not enter the first three World Cups. Amidst growing political turbulence in the 1930s, the British Foreign Office had influence over the national team, often determining who England could face. However, they did defeat the reigning World Cup champions Italy 3–2, in a match dubbed the "Battle of Highbury", in November 1934 which solidified the English's opinion that it was the best in the world. On 1 December 1937, Stanley Matthews scored a hat-trick in England's 5–4 victory over Czechoslovakia.

In May 1938, England toured Europe. The first match was against Germany in Berlin. Adolf Hitler wanted the game to be a showcase for Nazi propaganda. While the England players were getting changed, a Football Association official went into their dressing room, and told them that they had to make the Nazi salute during the playing of the German national anthem. Stanley Matthews later recalled:

The dressing room erupted. There was bedlam. All the England players were livid and totally opposed to this, myself included. Everyone was shouting at once. Eddie Hapgood, normally a respectful and devoted captain, wagged his finger at the official and told him what he could do with the Nazi salute, which involved putting it where the sun doesn't shine.

The FA official left, but returned saying he had a direct order from British Ambassador Nevile Henderson that the players must make the salute, because the political situation between Britain and Germany was now so sensitive it needed "only a spark to set Europe alight". Reluctantly the England team raised their right arms, except for Stan Cullis who refused, and was subsequently dropped from the squad. The game was watched by 110,000 people as well as senior Nazis, including Hermann Göring and Joseph Goebbels. England won the game 6–3. The game included a goal scored by Len Goulden that Matthews described as "the greatest goal I ever saw in football". According to Matthews:

Len met the ball on the run; without surrendering any pace, his left leg cocked back like the trigger of a gun, snapped forward and he met the ball full face on the volley. To use modern parlance, his shot was like an Exocet missile. The German goalkeeper may well have seen it coming, but he could do absolutely nothing about it. From 25 yards, the ball screamed into the roof of the net with such power, that the netting was ripped from two of the pegs, by which it was tied to the crossbar.

On 1 September 1939, Germany invaded Poland. Three days later, Neville Chamberlain declared war on Germany. The government immediately imposed a ban on the assembly of crowds resulting in the end of all league football matches apart from some unofficial wartime internationals played between 11 November 1939 and 5 May 1945, for which the largest crowd was 133,000 on 24 April 1944 and again on 14 April 1945 in matches at Hampden Park.

== Post-war era: Walter Winterbottom (1946–1962) ==
Between 27 May 1945 and 19 May 1946, England played seven unofficial Victory Internationals, an unofficial international match against Scotland on 24 August 1946 (2–2), and unofficial internationals against Switzerland and Switzerland 'B'.

The FA rejoined FIFA in 1946, helped by a sense of European unity at the end of the war. The same year, new FA Secretary Stanley Rous suggested that the FA needed an expert on the coaching staff. Walter Winterbottom was appointed as England Team Manager and Director of Coaching despite initial resistance from the FA Council, (although the team was picked by a committee). Winterbottom's reign began strongly with a series of lopsided victories, providing a false sense of security that the post-war England team had retained its early international preeminence. In 1948, England gained two notable victories, 4–0 against the reigning world champions Italy in Turin, and 10–0 against Portugal in Lisbon, after which the players involved were nicknamed the "lions of Lisbon".

England's fortunes then took a sharp decline, losing for the first time against non-UK opposition at home when they were defeated 2–0 by the Republic of Ireland in 1949 at Goodison Park, Liverpool. England came to their first World Cup in 1950 as one of the favourites to win. They made their World Cup finals debut with a 2–0 win against Chile. However, in the second match they suffered a 1–0 defeat to the United States, and failed to get beyond the first group stage after also losing 1–0 against Spain in their final game.

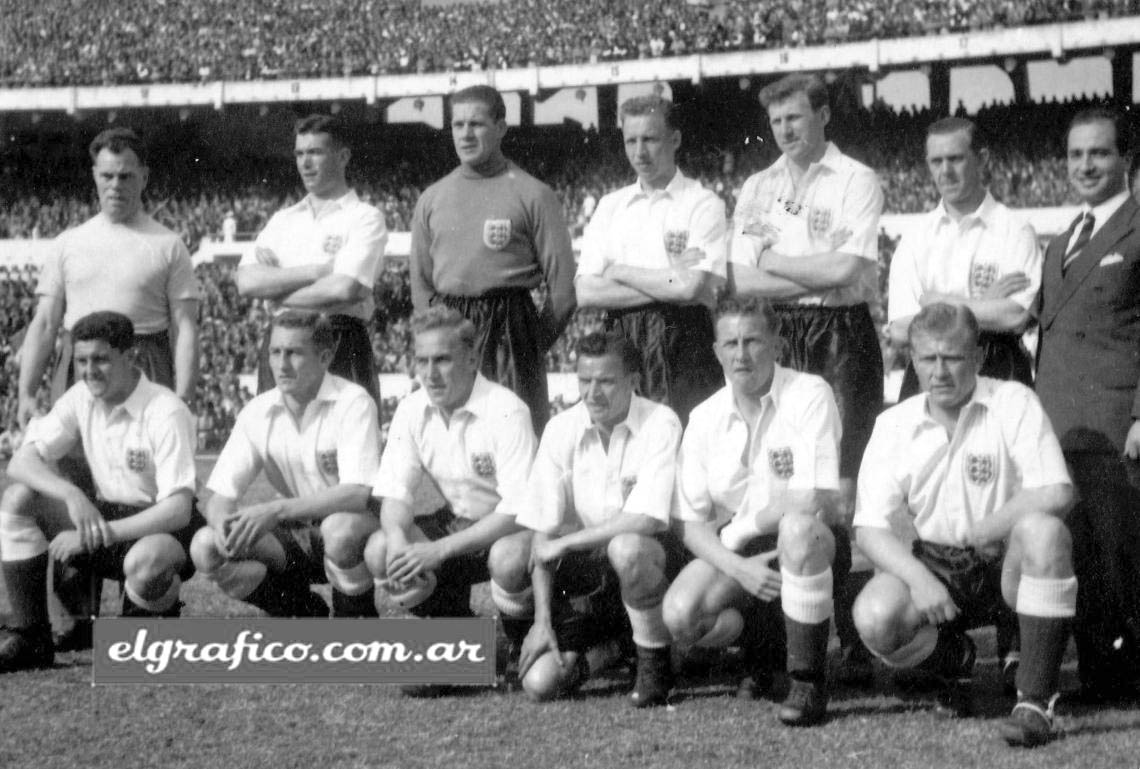
The England team that played a friendly v Argentina in May 1953

England's increasing tactical inferiority was highlighted on 25 November 1953, when Hungary came to Wembley. Fielding legendary players such as Ferenc Puskás, József Bozsik, Sándor Kocsis, Zoltán Czibor and Nándor Hidegkuti, Hungary outclassed England 6–3 – this was England's first home loss to opposition from outside of the British Isles. In the return match in Budapest, Hungary won 7–1, which still stands as the worst defeat in England's history. Ivor Broadis scored England's goal. After the game, the bewildered England centre-half Syd Owen said, "It was like playing people from outer space." Winterbottom was subsequently granted the right to team selection alongside two members of the selection committee.

In the 1954 World Cup, two goals by Broadis saw him become the first England player to score two goals in a game at the World Cup finals. In the same match, Nat Lofthouse also scored twice in a 4–4 draw against Belgium. England reached the quarter-finals for the first time, but were eliminated 4–2 by Uruguay.

=== The Munich disaster and the 1958 World Cup ===
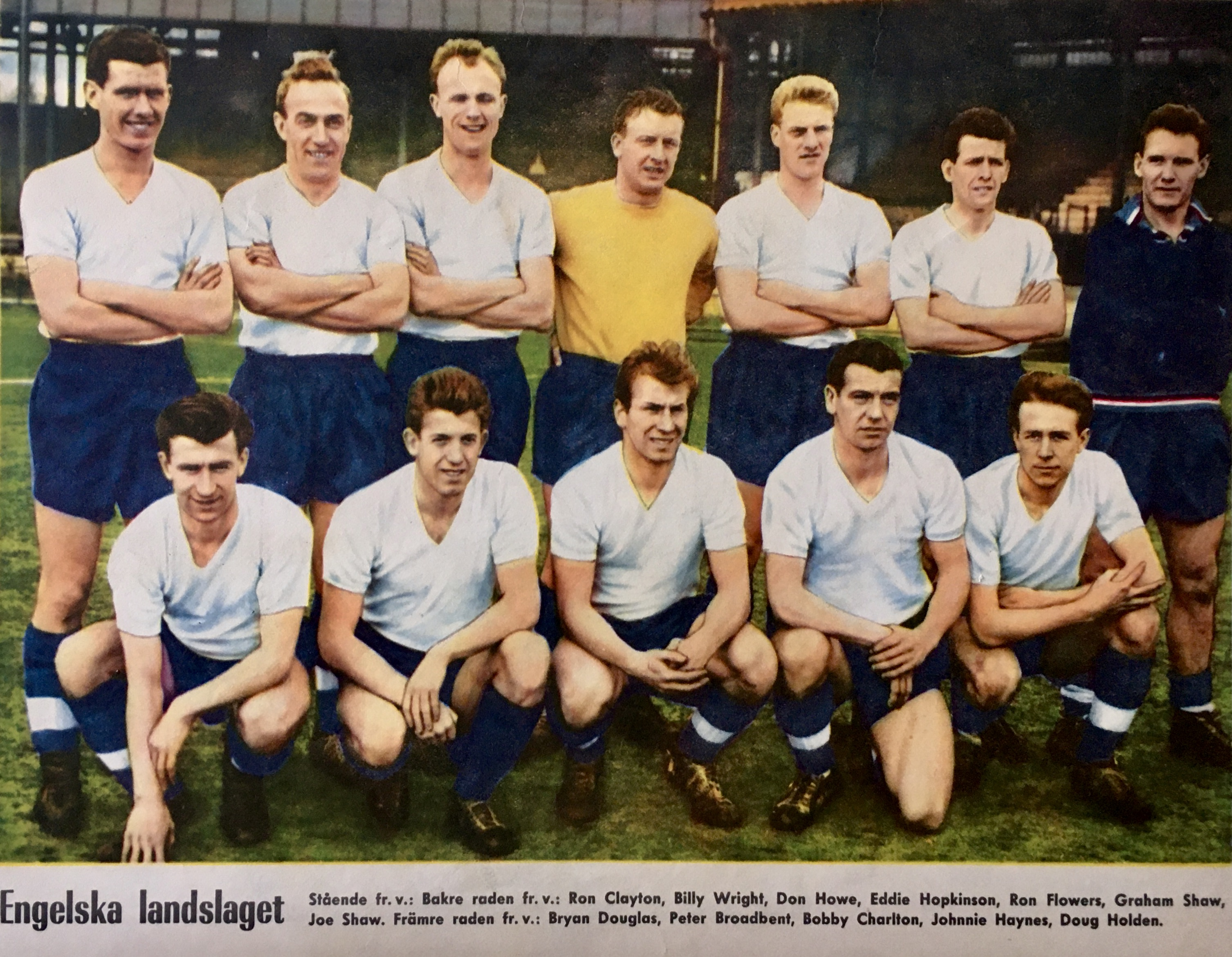
England's winning team against Scotland at Wembley, 11 April 1959. From the left, standing: Ronnie Clayton, Billy Wright (captain), Don Howe, Eddie Hopkinson, Ron Flowers, Graham Shaw, Joe Shaw; front row: Bryan Douglas, Peter Broadbent, Bobby Charlton, Johnny Haynes and Doug Holden.

On 15 May 1957, Stanley Matthews made his last appearance for England, in a 4–1 defeat by Denmark in Copenhagen. He was 42 years and 104 days old and remains the oldest player to represent his country.

Hopes of success at the 1958 World Cup finals were hit by the Munich air disaster in February that year, which claimed the lives of eight Manchester United players. Three of the players who died were established England internationals. They were full-back Roger Byrne, who had never missed an England game since making his debut for the country in 1954, centre-forward Tommy Taylor, who had scored 16 goals in just 19 appearances for his country, and wing-half Duncan Edwards, who was then widely regarded as the finest player in English football at that time. Also killed was David Pegg, who had just made his debut for England and was tipped as the successor in the national team to Tom Finney, who retired from international action later in 1958. Winger Johnny Berry, who had been capped four times for England, survived the crash but was injured to such an extent that he never played football again.

Forward Bobby Charlton, who was injured in the crash, recovered sufficiently to make his England debut in April that year and begin one of the great England international careers, which eventually yielded 106 caps, 49 goals and a World Cup winner's medal. For the World Cup finals in Sweden, England exited in the group stages after a play-off defeat against the Soviet Union, after the two had finished level in second spot in their group. England's inside forward Johnny Haynes remarked after elimination in 1958, "Everyone in England thinks we have a God given right to win the World Cup." Joe Mears as chief selector became the scapegoat. However, by the end of the decade, emerging talents such as the prolific goalscorer Jimmy Greaves suggested that sufficiently talented players were available, provided the tactical side of the game could bring the best out of them.

By the 1960s, English tactics and training had started to improve, and England turned in a respectable performance in the 1962 World Cup in Chile, losing 3–1 in the quarter-finals to the eventual winners, Brazil. By now, more young players were making their mark, including the elegant young defender Bobby Moore. After Winterbottom left in 1962 to become general secretary of the Central Council of Physical Recreation, England's former captain Alf Ramsey was appointed and crucially won the right to choose the squad and team himself, taking that role away from the selection committee.

== Alf Ramsey (1963–1974) ==
As part of the FA's centenary celebrations, England hosted a Rest of the World XI at Wembley Stadium with the Three Lions winning 2–1.

=== World champions ===
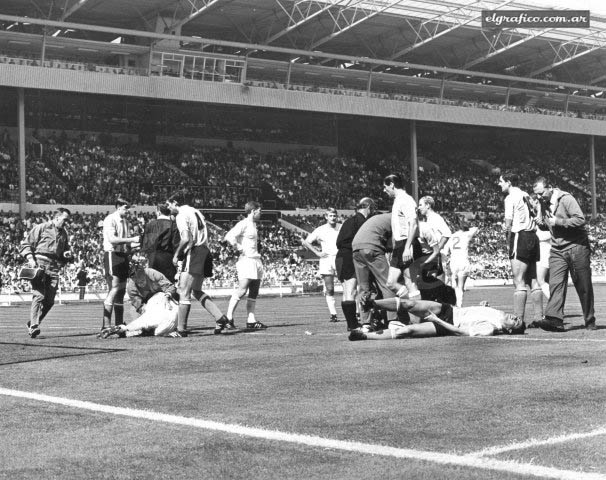
An incident in the match against Argentina at the 1966 World Cup

Two months before the tournament, Ramsey boldly predicted that England would win the next World Cup, which England were hosting. Ramsey's prediction came true, and the 1966 World Cup on home soil was England's finest moment. Ramsey's England team were nicknamed the "Wingless Wonders", a phrase coined by the press after Ramsey devised a new 4-3-3 system that relied on hard-running midfield players rather than natural wingers. An unremarkable group phase saw them win two and draw one of their games, with a 30-yard strike by Bobby Charlton at Wembley against Mexico proving a highlight. An injury to the centre-forward Jimmy Greaves in the final group match against France prompted Ramsey into a rethink for the quarter-final against Argentina, and the inexperienced replacement Geoff Hurst responded by scoring the only goal of the game. Charlton then hit both goals in a 2–1 semi-final win over Portugal to take England into the final, where they met West Germany.

By now, Greaves was fit again, but Ramsey kept faith with Hurst, despite calls from the media for the main goalscorer to return. England won the final 4–2 after extra time, with three goals from Hurst and one from Martin Peters. Hurst's second goal was controversial, with West Germany's players protesting that the ball did not fully cross the goal-line after bouncing down from the crossbar. Moore became the first and, to date, only England captain to lift the World Cup. The game prompted a memorable piece of commentary from the BBC's Kenneth Wolstenholme when describing the run and shot from Hurst which led to his third goal at the end of extra time: "Some of the crowd are on the pitch, they think it's all over!...It is now!"

The three lions qualified for the UEFA Euro 1968 final tournament courtesy of a 3–1 aggregate win over Spain. At the 1968 European Championships, England reached the semi-finals before losing to Yugoslavia 1–0, with a goal in the 86th minute. Alan Mullery became the first player to be sent off while playing for England. In the third-place play-off, England beat the Soviet Union 2–0 thanks to goals from Bobby Charlton and Geoff Hurst.

=== 1970 World Cup ===
In Mexico, for the 1970 World Cup, Alf Ramsey thought England had a stronger squad than in 1966. The world-class nucleus of Bobby Charlton, Moore and Gordon Banks was still intact; Hurst, Peters and Alan Ball had further enhanced their reputations, and Mullery, Terry Cooper, Colin Bell and Allan Clarke had been added to the squad. England's preparations in Colombia were disrupted when Bobby Moore was arrested in the Bogotá Bracelet incident, before he was given a conditional release. Despite the intense tropical heat and humidity, England progressed with some ease to the quarter-finals, despite a 1–0 defeat by the favourites Brazil in the group stage, which was notable for a stunning save by Banks from Pelé and one of Moore's finest performances in an England shirt.

In the quarter-finals, at the Estadio Nou Camp in León, England again faced West Germany. However, Banks was ruled out with food-poisoning, and his late replacement was Peter Bonetti. England coasted into a 2–0 lead just after half-time with goals from Mullery and Peters, but the Germans fought back to 2–2 through Franz Beckenbauer and Uwe Seeler. Hurst had a goal disallowed, before Gerd Müller scored the winning goal for Germany in extra time. Charlton broke Billy Wright's record for England caps in this game but told Ramsey on the flight home from Mexico that he no longer wished to be considered for future selection. Ramsay said, "We must now look ahead to the next World Cup in Munich where our chances of winning I would say are very good indeed." This would be England's last World Cup finals match for 12 years.

=== West German and Polish defeats 1972–1974 ===
England failed to reach the final stages of the 1972 European Championships in Belgium after again losing to West Germany. The two-legged quarter-final resulted in a 3–1 win for the Germans at Wembley and a goalless draw in Berlin. Geoff Hurst made his final England appearance in the first of these games.

Attention then turned to qualification for the 1974 World Cup in West Germany. England had not needed to qualify since 1962, due to the automatic qualification given to them as hosts in 1966 and holders in 1970. After a win and a draw against Wales, England faced Poland, the reigning Olympic champions. The Poles had lost their first match in Cardiff, but England went a goal down from a free-kick after a defensive error by Bobby Moore and the goalkeeper, Peter Shilton. This was compounded two minutes into the second half when Moore allowed Włodzimierz Lubański to dispossess him and make it 2–0. With less than a quarter of an hour to go, Alan Ball became the second player to be sent off while playing for England, which ruled him out of the return match.

England required a victory at Wembley against the Poles to qualify. England created chance after chance but failed to score, largely due to the performance of the Polish goalkeeper, Jan Tomaszewski. Twelve minutes into the second half, Norman Hunter, in the team for Moore, lost the ball to Grzegorz Lato, who squared it for Jan Domarski to shoot under Shilton's body. Although Allan Clarke equalised from a penalty six minutes later and England continued to create chances, the score remained 1–1 and England were eliminated in the qualifiers for the first time in World Cup campaign. Poland went on to finish third in the World Cup the following summer. After the FA's International Committee had initially issued their support for Ramsey, three months later in April 1974, the Committee had decided to remove Ramsey.

== Revie and Greenwood 1974–1982 ==
After a brief period where Joe Mercer was caretaker manager of the side, the FA appointed Don Revie as Ramsey's permanent successor. England failed to qualify for the 1976 European Championships in Yugoslavia despite an opening 3–0 win at home over the eventual champions, Czechoslovakia, and a 5–0 win over Cyprus in which Malcolm Macdonald scored all five goals, a post-war record.

A 2–1 defeat in the return in Czechoslovakia and a 0–0 draw at home against Portugal cost England, as they fell a point short of qualification. Revie's methods were criticised – insisting on increasing players' appearance fees when no player had expressed dissatisfaction, calling up oversized squads, dropping or ignoring in-form players, the use of dossiers on the opposition and his attempts to cultivate a "club" atmosphere with the players – and his position was continually undermined by the chairman of the English FA, Harold Thompson, who Ted Croker commented seemed bent on humiliating Revie.

Revie selected a squad to take part in a mini-tournament in South America in the summer of 1977, but initially did not accompany the players, saying he was going to scout the opposition England were still due to face in the qualifiers for the 1978 World Cup in Argentina. Instead, he was putting the final seal on a lucrative deal to take charge of the national side of the United Arab Emirates. After his resignation, he was banned from working in English football for a decade, and although he overturned the ban on appeal, his reputation was ruined and he never worked in English football again.

Brian Clough applied for the vacant manager's post, but the FA rejected him and instead gave the role to Ron Greenwood, who had been brought out of retirement to act as caretaker manager after Revie's exit. Greenwood was unable to rescue England's World Cup campaign, the damage already having been done in a 2–0 defeat by Italy in the Stadio Olimpico, Rome in November 1976. Although England won the return against Italy 2–0 and finished level on points with the Italians, they missed out on qualification on goal difference.

=== Euro 1980 ===
Greenwood took England to their first major tournament in a decade when they qualified for the expanded European Championship finals in Italy in 1980. During the qualification campaign, England also played a friendly against Czechoslovakia in which Viv Anderson became the first black player to win an England cap in November 1978. England were unspectacular at the finals, and did not progress beyond their group, which was topped by Belgium. The team were attracting an ever-growing hooligan element in their support, especially at matches abroad, and Italian police were forced to deploy tear gas in the match against Belgium.

=== 1982 World Cup ===
Bryan Robson, Kenny Sansom, Terry Butcher and Glenn Hoddle were already fully fledged internationals as England turned their attention to qualifying for the 1982 World Cup in Spain. England struggled to find consistency in a campaign that saw them lose away to Norway, Switzerland and Romania, and Greenwood was set to resign after the away match against Hungary before being persuaded to stay on by his players during the flight home. Eventually England benefitted from other results and qualified with a 1–0 win in the Wembley return match against Hungary in the final game.

At the finals, England won all three of their group games, and Robson scored just 27 seconds into the opening match against France. England were eliminated when they finished second in a tough second-round pool that included Spain and West Germany, despite remaining unbeaten in five matches. Greenwood announced his immediate retirement. This was also another tournament marred by violence, a problem which would continue through the rest of the decade when England went overseas.

== Robson revival, 1982–1990 ==
Although at the time he was widely derided by the tabloid press, Bobby Robson is now looked upon by many fans and pundits as one of England's more successful managers. He started badly on a public relations front by not telling captain Kevin Keegan that he would not be calling him into his first squad. Keegan heard the news via the media, aired his disgust and retired from the international game.

On the pitch, Robson's England failed to make the final stages of the 1984 European Championships in France, their hopes of qualification effectively ended in the autumn of 1983 when they lost 1–0 to Denmark at Wembley. Robson initially offered his resignation but the Football Association rejected it. At the time, the England team was in a period of transition, with experienced players coming to the end of their international careers, but an impressive set of younger players, including striker Gary Lineker, winger Trevor Steven and midfielder Chris Waddle, helped England comfortably seal qualification for the 1986 World Cup in Mexico. A month before the tournament started, the team went to train in high altitude conditions in Colorado Springs, followed by a spell in Los Angeles, where they beat the tournament hosts 3–0 in a friendly at the Memorial Coliseum.

In the intense heat and humidity of Monterrey, England began the World Cup badly, losing to Portugal, and then drawing with Morocco in a game which saw Ray Wilkins become the first England player to be sent off at a World Cup finals. They also lost their captain Bryan Robson to a dislocated shoulder, which ended his participation in the tournament. Under pressure to qualify, England rescued their campaign with a win over Poland, thanks to a first-half hat-trick from Lineker.

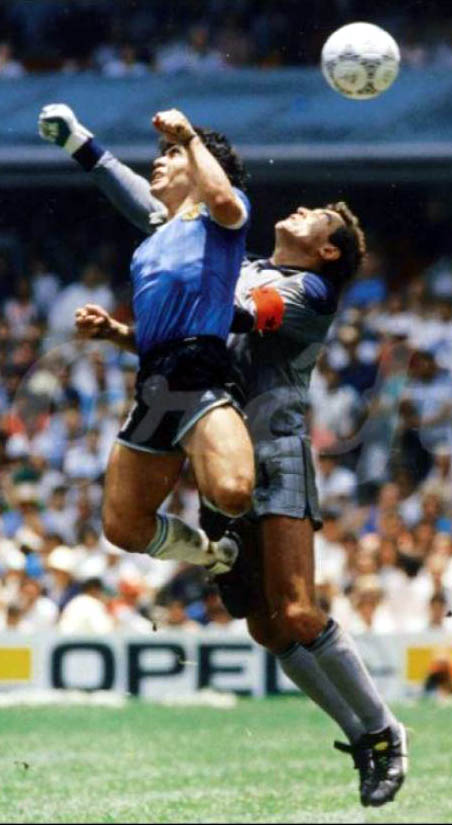
The "Hand of God" by Diego Maradona in 1986

In the second round, England defeated Paraguay 3–0 in the high altitude of Mexico City's Azteca Stadium, with Lineker scoring twice more, but were to fall short in controversial circumstances against the eventual winners Argentina in the quarter finals, after two goals from Diego Maradona – the first was the "Hand of God" goal, where Maradona punched the ball past Peter Shilton into the net. Maradona's second goal was later voted as the Goal of the Century in a FIFA poll, dribbling from his own half to score. Lineker pulled a goal back, but England were unable to find an equaliser and went out 2–1. Lineker was the first England player to win the Golden Boot as the tournament's top scorer, with six goals.

England suffered a setback two years later at the 1988 European Championships in West Germany. They qualified comfortably, but six months before the tournament lost key defender Terry Butcher with a broken leg, and went on to be defeated in all three of their group games at the finals. These defeats included a 1–0 defeat in Stuttgart by the Republic of Ireland, playing in the finals for the first time and managed by Jack Charlton, a member of England's 1966 World Cup winning team. The tournament also marked the final England appearances of Glenn Hoddle and Kenny Sansom after lengthy careers in the England side.

England's performance sparked public and media criticism of Robson, who offered his resignation, but it was rejected and he stayed in charge as England looked to qualify for the 1990 World Cup in Italy. England finished second to Sweden in their qualifying group, as they sealed qualification without conceding a goal. The tournament was to be Robson's last tournament in charge, as he had decided that he would not extend his contract and would instead be returning to club football with PSV Eindhoven. It turned out to be England's best World Cup since 1966; after a slow start in the group stage, where they played all their group stage matches in Cagliari on the island of Sardinia at the British government's request, England managed narrow wins after extra-time over Belgium in Bologna and Cameroon in Naples. They were beaten in Turin on penalties by West Germany in the semi-finals after a 1–1 draw, with Stuart Pearce and Chris Waddle failing from the spot.

England lost the third place play-off 2–1 to Italy in Bari, and so finished fourth. Several factors in their World Cup run initiated the international and domestic rehabilitation of the reputation of football in British society following the Heysel disaster of 1985 and hooliganism: the team's good performance, the relative lack of violence, winning the Fair Play Award, and the emergence of Paul Gascoigne, who cried after being booked against West Germany, which would have ruled him out of the final had England won. Shilton retired from international football after the World Cup with 125 caps, a national record which remains to this day.

== 1990s ==
=== Taylor, 1990–93: "Best we forget" ===
Robson's successor, Graham Taylor, failed to build on the team that fared well in 1990 and discarded experienced players. While England qualified for the 1992 European Championships in Sweden, they crashed out in the group stage with no wins and only managed a single goal. Taylor was widely criticised for taking off Lineker against the host team in the striker's final England appearance, when the team needed a goal and Lineker needed to score just one more goal to equal Bobby Charlton's record of 49 for the national team. Taylor was vilified by the press, leading The Sun to begin a campaign portraying him as a turnip.

England hit another low under Taylor's reign when they lost 2–0 to the United States in Boston during a summer tournament in 1993. England failed to qualify for the 1994 World Cup in the United States after suffering away defeats to Norway in Oslo and the Netherlands in Rotterdam. In the latter game, the Dutch defender Ronald Koeman escaped being sent off after fouling Platt to prevent a goal that would have put England in the lead. Taylor's irate reaction was broadcast to millions as part of the documentary An Impossible Job. Koeman scored shortly afterwards, and Dennis Bergkamp added another as England lost 2–0. In their last qualifying match, England went 1–0 down to San Marino when the minnows scored the fastest World Cup goal after just eight seconds. Although England recovered to win 7–1, the Netherlands also won their final qualifying game to join Norway in qualification and eliminate England.

Taylor resigned the following week. His reign is regarded as one of the bleakest in England's history: in the FA's official history of the England team, the chapter on Taylor's tenure is entitled "Best we forget". On 28 January 1994, Terry Venables, who had left Tottenham Hotspur in acrimonious circumstances the previous year, was appointed.

=== Venables, 1994–96: "Football comes home" ===
Venables oversaw a much improved performance at the UEFA Euro 1996. As the hosts, England qualified automatically in a tournament that marked the 30th anniversary of the 1966 World Cup victory. England played all their matches at Wembley, and qualified from the first round as group winners. They recorded a 2–0 victory over Scotland, featuring a crucial David Seaman penalty save and an acclaimed Gascoigne goal. The Three Lions also recorded a 4–1 win against the Netherlands.

In the quarter-finals, they won a penalty shoot-out for the first time in a match against Spain. England then lost a semi-final on penalties to Germany after drawing 1–1, with Gareth Southgate missing the decisive penalty in sudden-death when his penalty was saved by Andreas Köpke. Alan Shearer, who had taken over from Lineker as England's core centre-forward, was the tournament's top scorer with five goals.

Due to tension between himself and the FA over the extension of his contract after the tournament, Venables announced in January 1996 that he would step down after the European Championship due to his focus on pending court cases.

=== Hoddle, 1996–99 ===
On 2 May 1996, Glenn Hoddle was named as the new England manager, eight years after his final international appearance, and one year after his last game at club level. Hoddle selected Shearer as his captain, replacing Adams.

Hoddle oversaw England's qualification for the 1998 World Cup in France with a 0–0 draw against Italy at the Stadio Olimpico in Rome. In the summer of 1997, his side were successful in the Tournoi de France, a friendly tournament held before the World Cup, against Brazil and Italy and the competition hosts.

After this promising build-up, Hoddle came under fire for omitting fans' favourites Paul Gascoigne and Matt Le Tissier from the squad for the finals, bringing their international careers to an end. England were eventually knocked out of the World Cup on penalties, this time in the last 16 to Argentina in a classic match played in the intense heat of Saint-Étienne. England had led in the first half after a wonder goal from the 18-year-old striker Michael Owen, who had first been capped four months earlier, but were forced to hold in for a 2–2 draw after Beckham was sent off for an altercation with Diego Simeone.

Hoddle revealed only after his team had been knocked out "my innermost thought, which was that England would win the World Cup". Beckham was scapegoated for the defeat, and recalled later that he took so much abuse that "I've got a little book in which I've written down the names of those people who upset me the most. I don't want to name them because I want it to be a surprise when I get them back."

Hoddle's approach attracted criticism over his religious convictions and insistence on employing a faith healer as part of the set-up. Things became worse when his side's results deteriorated after the World Cup, as England suffered a poor start to the Euro 2000 qualifying tournament, and there was reported discontent between Hoddle and several senior players, most notably Shearer. Hoddle was dismissed on 2 February 1999, two days after an interview with The Sunday Times in which he spoke about his belief in reincarnation and was reported as saying that disabled people were paying for sins in a previous life.

=== Keegan, 1999–2000: "A little bit short" ===
Under considerable media and public pressure, the FA appointed England's former captain Kevin Keegan as Hoddle's successor. Keegan's team struggled to qualify for the 2000 European Championships; despite a promising win over Poland in the new manager's first match in charge. After a series of indifferent performances, England entered the play-offs thanks to results elsewhere, with the group winners Sweden defeating Poland in their last match. They secured qualification by beating Scotland 2–1 on aggregate, having lost the second leg at Wembley. Before the tournament, Shearer announced his intention to retire from international football after the finals in Belgium and the Netherlands. At the finals, a lacklustre England failed to get beyond the group stage. Firstly, they lost to Portugal before defeating Germany 1–0 thanks to a goal by Shearer. The Three Lions were then eliminated by Romania, who scored the winning goal from a penalty with two minutes to go.

On 7 October 2000, after losing the opening World Cup qualifier to Germany in the last game at Wembley before its redevelopment, Keegan resigned, citing that he was "a little bit short for what is required of this job". The FA's chief executive of the time, Adam Crozier, reluctantly accepted Keegan's resignation in the Wembley tunnel's lavatory, and before leaving the stadium, he telephoned the agent of Sven-Göran Eriksson to talk about the vacancy. While a deal was set up, Howard Wilkinson was hastily appointed as the stand-in manager for a qualifier with Finland, which England drew 0–0. A month later, it was confirmed that Eriksson would be Keegan's permanent successor, but would not take up the job until June 2001 because of his commitment to Lazio.

The former England under-21 manager Peter Taylor was appointed as the caretaker manager for a friendly against Italy, and it was widely expected that he would act as temporary manager until Eriksson formally took charge, despite his own commitment to Leicester City. The matter was rendered moot when Eriksson resigned from Lazio at the start of 2001, allowing him to take over before England's next fixture. Taylor did make one consequential decision during his caretaker spell, by giving the position of team captain, which had remained vacant since Shearer's retirement, to Beckham.

== 2000s: England turns to foreign management ==
=== Eriksson, 2001–06 ===
As a Swedish national, Sven-Göran Eriksson was the first foreign coach to be appointed as England's manager, a decision that attracted controversy. He immediately turned around the team's qualifying campaign with a 5–1 victory over Germany in Munich, where England came from behind with goals from Emile Heskey, Steven Gerrard and a Michael Owen hat-trick. England ensured qualification for the 2002 World Cup after a tense final game against Greece, with David Beckham scoring from a free-kick in the last seconds to make the score 2–2 and put England top of their group on goal difference.

In the finals in South Korea and Japan, England beat Argentina 1–0 in the group stage, David Beckham scoring the only goal with a penalty, and reached the quarter-finals, where they met Brazil. England went in front when Owen took advantage of a Brazilian defensive mistake, but an equaliser from Rivaldo and a free-kick by Ronaldinho saw Brazil turn the game round to win 2–1. England could not create any more good chances, despite Ronaldinho later being sent off, and were eliminated by the eventual winners.

For the 2004 European Championships, England came top of their qualification group, with the teenage striker Wayne Rooney installed as a new star in their attack. His emergence was tempered by the loss of defender Rio Ferdinand, who was given an eight-month ban in December 2003 after missing a drugs test, ruling him out of the finals. In England's opening match against France, Frank Lampard scored a first-half goal and despite a missed penalty from Beckham, they still led until the final minutes, when Zinedine Zidane scored two quick goals to win the game for France 2–1. England progressed with Rooney scoring twice in games against both Switzerland and Croatia. In the quarter-finals, Owen scored early against the hosts Portugal, but England's challenge was affected by the loss of Rooney to a broken bone in his foot. Sol Campbell scored a goal that was disallowed and England eventually lost in a penalty shoot-out after a 2–2 draw, with Beckham and Darius Vassell missing their penalties.

2005 saw Eriksson receive heavy criticism from fans for his defensive strategies, alleged lack of passion, lack of communication with the players from the bench and a perceived inability to change tactics when necessary in a game. A 4–1 loss to Denmark in a friendly was followed by a humiliating 1–0 defeat by Northern Ireland in a World Cup qualifier. Despite further criticism, an unconvincing 1–0 victory against Austria allowed England to qualify for the 2006 World Cup finals with one match to spare.

In January 2006, following revelations made in the News of the World, the FA decided to come to an agreement with Eriksson over his future, and shortly afterwards it was announced that Eriksson was to stand down after the World Cup finals. Several possible successors were linked with the job; after a series of interviews that was criticised for its length, the Portugal national team manager Luiz Felipe Scolari was allegedly offered the job. In April, Scolari declined, in the belief that accepting the offer before a World Cup would conflict with his managerial duties for Portugal. On 4 May 2006, it was announced that Steve McClaren would succeed Eriksson after the World Cup.

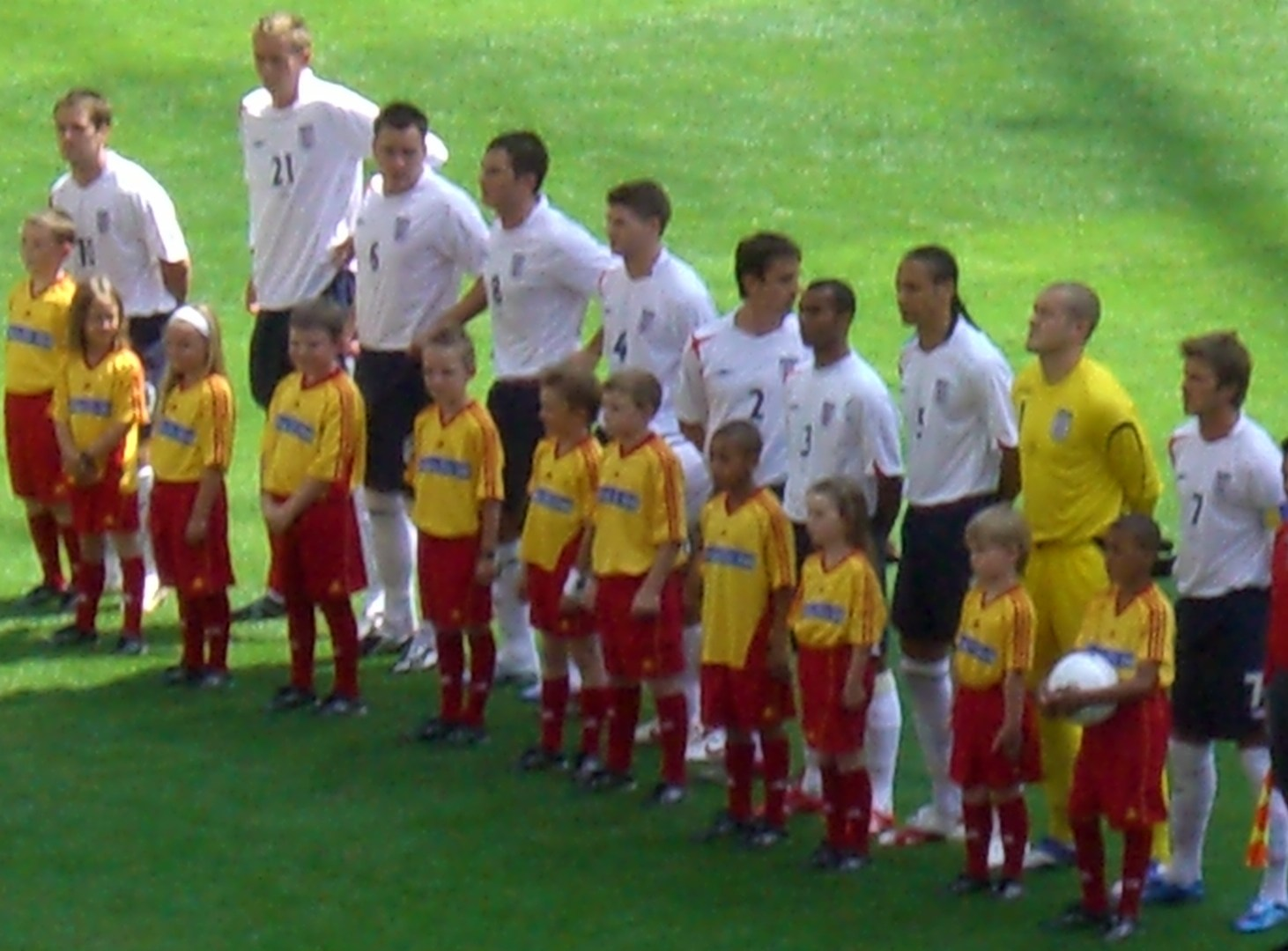
England's team (back row) for the match against Paraguay, 2006 World Cup

England's 2006 World Cup campaign began with a 1–0 win against Paraguay in the Waldstadion in Frankfurt, after an early own-goal by Carlos Gamarra from Beckham's free-kick. Late goals from Peter Crouch and Gerrard then secured England's place in the last 16 with a 2–0 victory over Trinidad and Tobago in the Frankenstadion in Nuremberg. Returning from injury after again breaking a bone in his foot, Rooney started England's final group match against Sweden in Cologne, but his strike partner Owen was stretchered off with a cruciate ligament injury in the fourth minute. A wonder strike from Joe Cole gave England the half-time lead, but Sweden equalised through Marcus Allbäck before Gerrard gave England the lead again in the 85th minute. England were denied a win when Henrik Larsson levelled again in the 90th minute.

In the second round, England beat Ecuador in Stuttgart, courtesy of a free-kick from Beckham, who became the first England player to score in three World Cup tournaments. In the quarter-final against Portugal, Beckham was substituted early in the second half with an ankle injury, and then Rooney was sent off for pushing Cristiano Ronaldo and stamping on Ricardo Carvalho's groin, though Rooney later denied it was intentional. A 0–0 draw led to a penalty shoot-out that England lost 3–1, with Lampard, Gerrard and Jamie Carragher all having their attempts saved by the Portuguese goalkeeper Ricardo. The morning after, a tearful Beckham announced that he was stepping down as captain, although he stressed that he was keen to continue playing for England.

=== McClaren, 2006–07: Qualifying failure ===
England's new manager Steve McClaren took over after the 2006 World Cup. He appointed Terry Venables as coach and John Terry as captain, and chose not to recall Beckham to the squad for almost a year.

England played their first match at the new Wembley Stadium against Brazil on 1 June 2007, with Terry scoring in a 1–1 draw for which Beckham was recalled. After wins in Euro 2008 qualification over Israel, Russia and Estonia, all by the score of 3–0, another victory against Russia would have guaranteed qualification, but despite England taking a first half lead through Rooney, Russia came back to win 2–1.

Russia's subsequent defeat to Israel gave England another opportunity - they now required a draw against Croatia, who had already qualified. With Owen, Rooney and Terry missing from the starting line-up, McClaren recalled players that were inexperienced and out of form, including Micah Richards, Wayne Bridge and Joleon Lescott. Scott Carson was handed his competitive debut in goal, and his mistake gave Croatia a 1–0 lead that they doubled soon after. England improved in the second half, with Lampard converting a penalty and Crouch equalising, but Mladen Petrić's late winning goal for Croatia meant that England missed their first major tournament since the 1994 World Cup.

The sight of McClaren standing on the touchline in the rain during this match became an enduring image of his tenure, and he was labelled "The Wally with the Brolly" by the media. McClaren refused to resign, but the next day, he and Venables were sacked by the FA.

=== Capello, 2007–12 ===
On 14 December 2007, Fabio Capello, the former manager of Milan, Real Madrid, Roma and Juventus, was named as the new manager of England. England won all of their first eight matches in their 2010 World Cup qualifying group, including a 5–1 victory against Croatia to qualify with two games to spare.

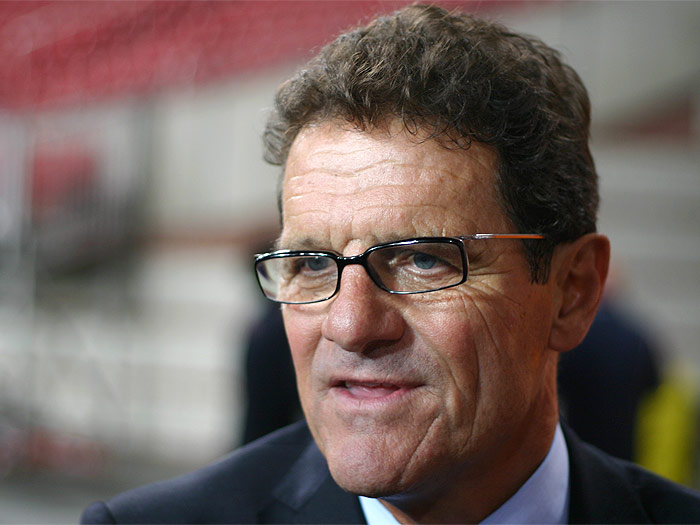
Italian manager Fabio Capello coached the team in the 2010 World Cup

England headed to the 2010 World Cup in South Africa seeded in Group C, which included the United States, Algeria and Slovenia. The opening match against the United States started well with Gerrard scoring after just four minutes, but Clint Dempsey equalised with a speculative shot that was mishandled by Rob Green; the game ended 1–1. England's second match against Algeria ended in a goalless draw, leading to the English press questioning Capello's tactics, as well as the team's spirit and ability to handle the pressure.

In the final match of the group stage, England rallied with a 1–0 victory against Slovenia thanks to a goal from Jermain Defoe. The United States' last-minute winner against Algeria meant that England finished as runners-up in the group, leaving them to face the Group D winners Germany in the second round. Germany took an early 2–0 lead thanks to goals by Miroslav Klose and Lukas Podolski. A goal for Matthew Upson halved the deficit for England, and 53 seconds later, Frank Lampard hit a strike that bounced down off the crossbar and appeared to cross the line, but no goal was awarded. After the match, the FIFA President Sepp Blatter apologised for the incident. As England searched for an equaliser, Germany scored an additional two goals on the counter attack in the second half to seal a 4–1 win.

Fabio Capello remained as manager despite speculation on his future following England's heaviest World Cup finals defeat. Capello dropped several established internationals for the first friendly of the new season: only ten of the 23 players from the World Cup squad were included for the squad against Hungary, which was won 2–1. England secured qualification for Euro 2012 with a 2–2 draw in Montenegro. The qualification was marred by the sending-off of Rooney, leaving him suspended for the first game of the finals.

== Hodgson and Allardyce, 2012–16: More tournament humiliation ==
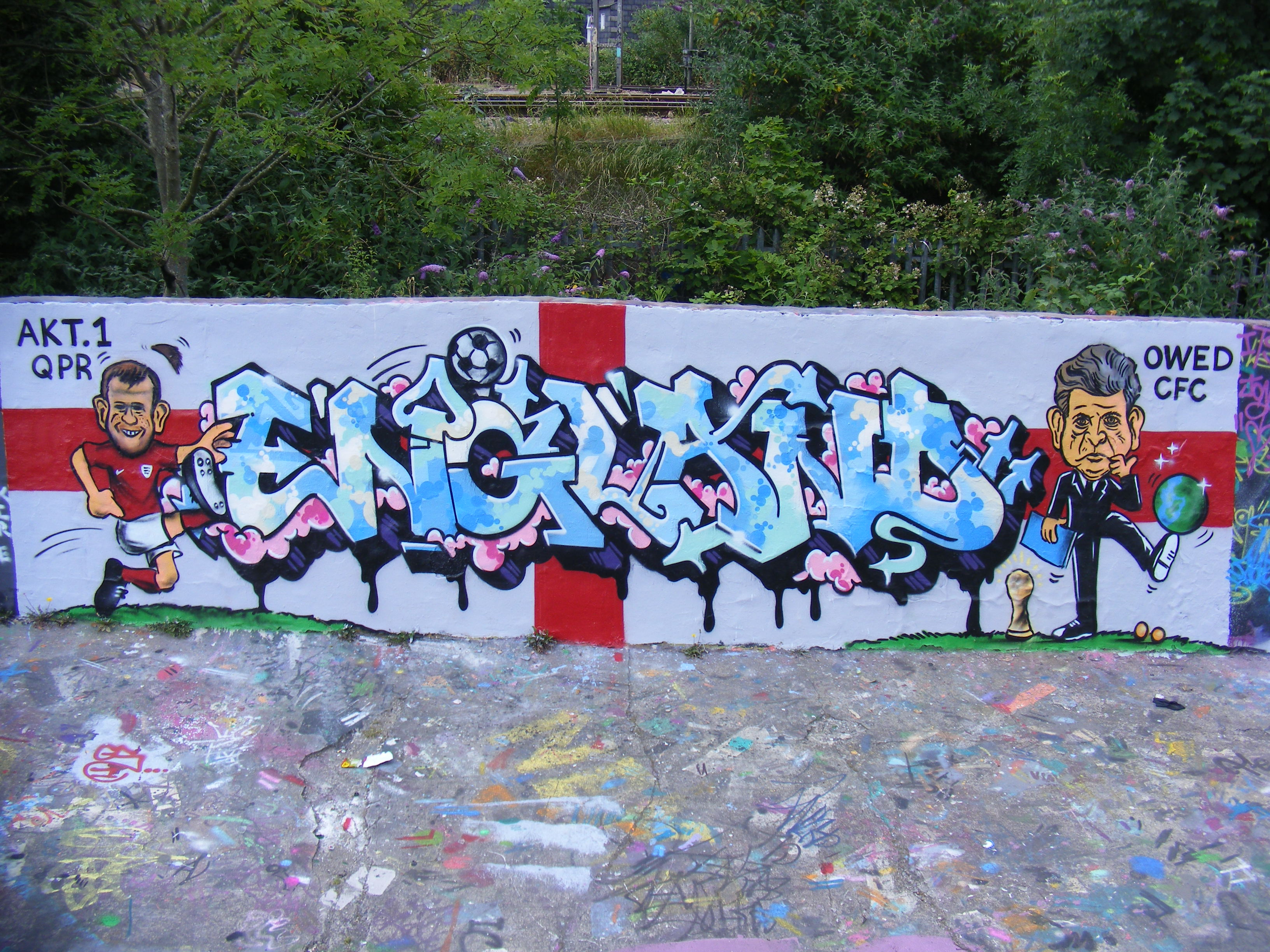
Graffiti depicting Wayne Rooney and Roy Hodgson, around the time of the 2014 World Cup

In February 2012, the sports manufacturers Umbro revealed a new home kit, designed purely from red and white, with a modified version of the FA's crest also in red tones.

John Terry was stripped of the captaincy for the second time after he was charged for racism offences relating to an incident in a Premier League match with the Queens Park Rangers player Anton Ferdinand. Capello told Italian media that he did not agree with the FA's decision to strip Terry of the captaincy. This resulted in rumours that Capello had breached his contract by failing to back decisions made by the executive board. On 8 February, the FA confirmed that Capello had resigned from the manager's job with immediate effect. On the same day, the Tottenham Hotspur manager Harry Redknapp was cleared of charges for tax evasion, and was immediately linked with the vacant role.

Stuart Pearce took charge for the rescheduled friendly against the Netherlands. On 1 May 2012, the FA announced that Roy Hodgson would take over as manager of the team. Steven Gerrard was promoted back to the captaincy when the provisional squad for the European Championships was announced. Hodgson's first competitive match was England's opening European Championship match against France in Kharkiv, a 1–1 draw. A dramatic 3–2 win over Sweden, also in Kharkiv, followed by a tense 1–0 victory over the co-hosts Ukraine, saw England top their group and face Italy in the quarter-finals. After a 0–0 draw after extra time, in which England were outplayed, with goalkeeper Joe Hart making numerous saves, England once again lost on penalties.

The year 2013 marked 150 years of the FA, and so a series of special friendly games was scheduled throughout the year, including fixtures against Brazil, Scotland and the Republic of Ireland. England started using kits produced by Nike, ending a long-term association with Umbro. Following a 4–1 win at home to Montenegro in October, Hodgson's side secured qualification for the 2014 World Cup by beating Poland 2–0 at home. In May 2014, having not been included in the FIFA World Cup squad, Ashley Cole decided to retire from international football having made 107 caps for England.

England failed to qualify from the group stage of the World Cup in Brazil, suffering defeats to Italy and Uruguay, and drawing 0–0 against Costa Rica. Costa Rica's earlier victory over Italy had eliminated England before the final match. After a World Cup described in the media as a debacle, Steven Gerrard and Frank Lampard retired from international football with Wayne Rooney being installed as the new captain after the World Cup. Gerrard retired with 114 caps and Lampard with 106.

England's first match following the tournament, a 1–0 friendly win over Norway, was the lowest attended England match at the new Wembley. In September 2015, England beat San Marino to become the first team to qualify for the 2016 European Championships. Against Switzerland, Rooney broke Bobby Charlton's England goalscoring record with his 50th goal for the national side. England ended their qualifying group with a 100% winning record, becoming only the sixth team in European Championship qualifying history to achieve this.

England were drawn in Group B for Euro 2016 to face Russia, Wales and Slovakia. Their first match, in Marseille against Russia, finished in a 1–1 draw, as they failed to make their domination in the match pay; Eric Dier put England in front from a free-kick before they conceded a stoppage time equaliser. In their second match in Lens, against Wales, England fell behind just before half-time when Joe Hart was unable to prevent Gareth Bale scoring from a free-kick. Hodgson responded by bringing on forwards Jamie Vardy and Daniel Sturridge at the start of the second half and the game turned in England's favour as both scored, with Sturridge netting the winner in stoppage time.

Hodgson rested six players for the final group match against Slovakia in Saint-Étienne, which ended in a goalless draw. Wales's win over Russia meant England finished as runners-up in Group B and faced Iceland in Nice in the second round. Rooney scored a penalty inside four minutes, but Ragnar Sigurðsson immediately equalised, and in the 18th minute, Kolbeinn Sigþórsson scored with the help of poor goalkeeping by Hart. Iceland defended resolutely as England struggled to recover, holding on for a 2–1 victory. England's players were booed off the pitch, and Hodgson announced his resignation straight after the match.

A little under a month after the European Championship defeat, the FA appointed Sunderland's manager Sam Allardyce as the new manager of the national side. Allardyce's first match for England was a 2018 World Cup qualifying match in Slovakia. England laboured to a 1–0 win in Trnava, with Adam Lallana scoring in stoppage time.

Shortly before the next round of qualifying matches, The Daily Telegraph broke a story of Allardyce appearing to meet a group of Asian businessmen, who were later revealed to be undercover journalists working for the newspaper. The meeting seemed to show Allardyce explaining how to "get around" breaking football transfer policies and apparently mocking Hodgson, the England players and the Duke of Cambridge. Allardyce apologised for his misconduct, but the FA sacked him on those grounds. His tenure of 67 days is the shortest for a permanent manager in England's history.

== Revival under Gareth Southgate, 2016–2024 ==
=== 2018 World Cup ===
On the same day as Allardyce departed, Gareth Southgate left his role as the manager of the England under-21 team and was put in temporary charge of the national team. On 30 November, he was appointed on a four-year contract. England finished first in their World Cup qualifying group with eight wins and two draws, scoring 18 goals and conceding just three.

At the World Cup, England were drawn in a group with Belgium, Tunisia and Panama. They began by beating Tunisia 2–1, with two goals from their captain Harry Kane, including a stoppage-time winner. They then hammered Panama 6–1, England's largest win at a World Cup or European Championships, with two goals from John Stones, a hat-trick from Kane and one from Jesse Lingard. With qualification already guaranteed, England lost 1–0 to Belgium and finished second in the group.

England played Colombia in the second round. They led 1–0 through a penalty from Kane before conceding a stoppage-time equaliser, and after extra-time won 4–3 on penalties, with Dier scoring the winning kick. It was England's first penalty shoot-out win at the World Cup. England beat Sweden 2–0 in the quarter-finals, with goals from Harry Maguire and Dele Alli, to reach the World Cup semi-finals for the first time since 1990. They lost 2–1 after extra time in the semi-finals to Croatia, despite taking the lead through an early free-kick from Kieran Trippier and dominating the first half. A goal from Ivan Perišić in the 68th minute sent the match into extra time, and Mario Mandžukić scored the winning goal to take Croatia to their first final. England played Belgium again in the third place play-off, and lost 2–0 to finish fourth. Kane won the Golden Boot for the tournament with six goals.

England took part in the inaugural season of the UEFA Nations League, in League A. They began with a 2–1 defeat to Spain at Wembley, which was their first competitive home defeat since 2007. England pulled off an impressive 3–2 win in the reverse fixture in Seville, when two goals by Raheem Sterling and one by Marcus Rashford put them three goals up before half-time. On 15 November, England played a friendly against the United States before which Wayne Rooney reversed his international football retirement to play one final international, coming on as a second-half substitute for his 120th cap as England won 3–0. England then resumed their Nations League participation with their final group match at home to Croatia, winning 2–1 with two late goals to ensure a first-place finish and qualify for the UEFA Nations League finals.

In the Nations League finals in Portugal, England lost 3–1 after extra-time to the Netherlands in the semi-finals. They won the third-place play-off against Switzerland on penalties after a goalless draw.

In November 2019, England played their 1,000th international match, an emphatic 7–0 home win over Montenegro which ensured qualification for the 2020 European Championships as group winners.

At the beginning of the new decade COVID-19 pandemic hit, meaning that England's scheduled friendlies were cancelled and the European Championships was postponed by one year. England did not play in 2020 until 5 September, when they began the 2020–21 season of the Nations League. The matches in the competition, as well as friendlies and their first 2022 World Cup qualifiers, were played behind closed doors under pandemic restrictions. England finished third in their Nations League group behind Belgium and Denmark, failing to qualify for the finals.

=== Euro 2020: England reach the final ===
The European Championships, originally scheduled for 2020, was held in the summer of 2021 in eleven countries across Europe, with some matches held in England. Limited crowds were permitted, with attendances increasing as the tournament progressed. England were drawn in Group D with Croatia, Scotland and Czech Republic and played all three of the group matches at Wembley. They began with a 1–0 win over Croatia, with Sterling scoring a second-half winner. England were frustrated in a 0–0 draw with Scotland at Wembley but beat the Czech Republic 1–0, thanks to another Sterling winner, to finish top of the group.

In the second round, England beat Germany 2–0 in a tight affair with goals by Sterling and Kane. They then beat Ukraine 4–0 at the Stadio Olimpico in Rome in the quarter-finals, with Kane scoring twice either side of goals by Maguire and Jordan Henderson, who netted his first international goal. England returned to Wembley for the semi-final against Denmark. The Danes took a first-half lead through a Mikkel Damsgaard free-kick, the first goal England had conceded at the tournament. They quickly responded as attacking pressure forced Simon Kjær to bundle home an own goal for the equaliser. England continued to dominate and they were awarded a controversial penalty in the first half of extra time. Kane's penalty was saved by Kasper Schmeichel but he scored from the rebound to send England to their first major final since 1966.

England faced Italy in the final at Wembley in front of over 67,000 supporters. England made a bright start and took the lead after two minutes through Luke Shaw, his first goal for the country and the quickest scored in a European Championship final. Italy dominated the second-half and eventually equalised through a scrappy goal by Leonardo Bonucci. There were no further goals in a cagey period of extra time, but Marcus Rashford, Jadon Sancho and Bukayo Saka all missed in the ensuing penalty shoot-out, which Italy won 3–2.

The final was surrounded with controversy after England fans without tickets attempted to enter the stadium. Eighty-six people were arrested during the altercations. UEFA started disciplinary proceedings and fined the Football Association £84,560, as well as forcing England to play one Nations League match behind closed doors.

England confirmed their qualification for the 2022 World Cup in November 2021 following a 10–0 away win against San Marino. This was also the first time England had scored double figures in a match since 1964.

The team had a poor 2022–23 Nations League campaign, finishing bottom of Group 3. Relegation to League B was confirmed with a 1–0 defeat to Italy. England had previously lost twice to Hungary, including a 4–0 home defeat, their largest home defeat since 1928. The first defeat in the group was England's first defeat in 22 matches, a record for the national team.

=== 2022 World Cup ===
For the 2022 FIFA World Cup, England were drawn alongside Iran, the United States and Wales in group B. In the first match, England beat Iran 6–2 thanks to goals from Jude Bellingham, a brace from Bukayo Saka, Raheem Sterling, Marcus Rashford and Jack Grealish. England then played out a goalless draw with the United States in the second match. In the final match, England confirmed qualification to the knockout round as group winners with a 3–0 win against Wales with goals from Phil Foden and two from Rashford.

In the round of 16, England faced the reigning African champions Senegal. Late first-half goals from Jordan Henderson and Harry Kane put England into control, before Saka added a third to ensure qualification for the next round. England were eliminated in the quarter-finals by the reigning world champions France. An early goal for Aurélien Tchouaméni put France ahead before Harry Kane equalised from the penalty spot. It was Kane's 53rd England goal, which put him level with Wayne Rooney as the national team's record goalscorer. Late in the match, a header from Olivier Giroud put France ahead. England were granted another penalty in the 84th minute, but Harry Kane missed and England were eliminated. Despite the defeat, England were widely praised by pundits for their performance against the French. With this defeat, England became the first country to be eliminated from the World Cup at the quarter-final stage seven times.

=== Euro 2024 ===
In a UEFA Euro 2024 qualifying match, Harry Kane scored his 54th international goal, breaking the goalscoring record in a 2–1 win against Italy. On 12 September 2023, England and Scotland commemorated the 150th anniversary of the first international fixture in a friendly at Hampden Park, with England winning 3–1. England remained unbeaten throughout 2023.

At the finals tournament, England qualified top of their group after beating Serbia 1–0 and drawing against Denmark (1–1) and Slovenia (0–0). In the knockout stage, they required a stoppage time equaliser against Slovakia from Jude Bellingham to stay in the tournament, before Harry Kane scored the winner in extra-time. They faced Switzerland in the quarter-finals and won on penalties after a 1–1 draw, thus advancing to the semi-finals against the Netherlands. England won 2–1 to seal consecutive appearances in European Championship finals. They lost the final to Spain 2–1, becoming the first team to lose two European Championship finals in a row.

== Thomas Tuchel, 2025– ==
Two days after the final, it was announced that Southgate had resigned from his role as England manager. He was replaced by interim manager Lee Carsley who was promoted from the England under-21s like Southgate. He was tasked with overseeing the autumn UEFA Nations League fixtures whilst the FA searched for Southgate's successor. On 16 October 2024, it was announced that former Chelsea and Bayern Munich manager Thomas Tuchel would be the new England manager from 1 January 2025, signing an 18-month deal. He carried the team up to the 2026 FIFA World Cup semifinals, where they were eliminated by Argentina 2–1.
