= 1872–73 in Scottish football =

Football in Scotland
- Season: 1872–73

1872–73 in Scottish football

Teams in the FA Cup
- Queen's Park

Season 1872–73 was the first in Scottish football in which the national team participated in officially recognised matches. There were as yet no organised domestic competitions.

== Overview ==
Queen's Park continued to be pioneers in the development of the sport in Scotland. As in the previous season, they entered for the FA Cup, albeit they failed to play any active part in this season's tournament.

Their most significant action in the 1872–73 season was to help initiate the birth of international football, organising the Scotland side which took on England in what is considered the first "official" international match.

== FA Cup ==
In recognition of the travel difficulties they faced in reaching South East England, where the other entrants were all based, Queen's were allowed a bye directly through to the semi-finals, where they were drawn against Oxford University, however Queen's were still unable to finance the journey and withdrew from the competition.

== Scotland national team ==
=== Overview ===
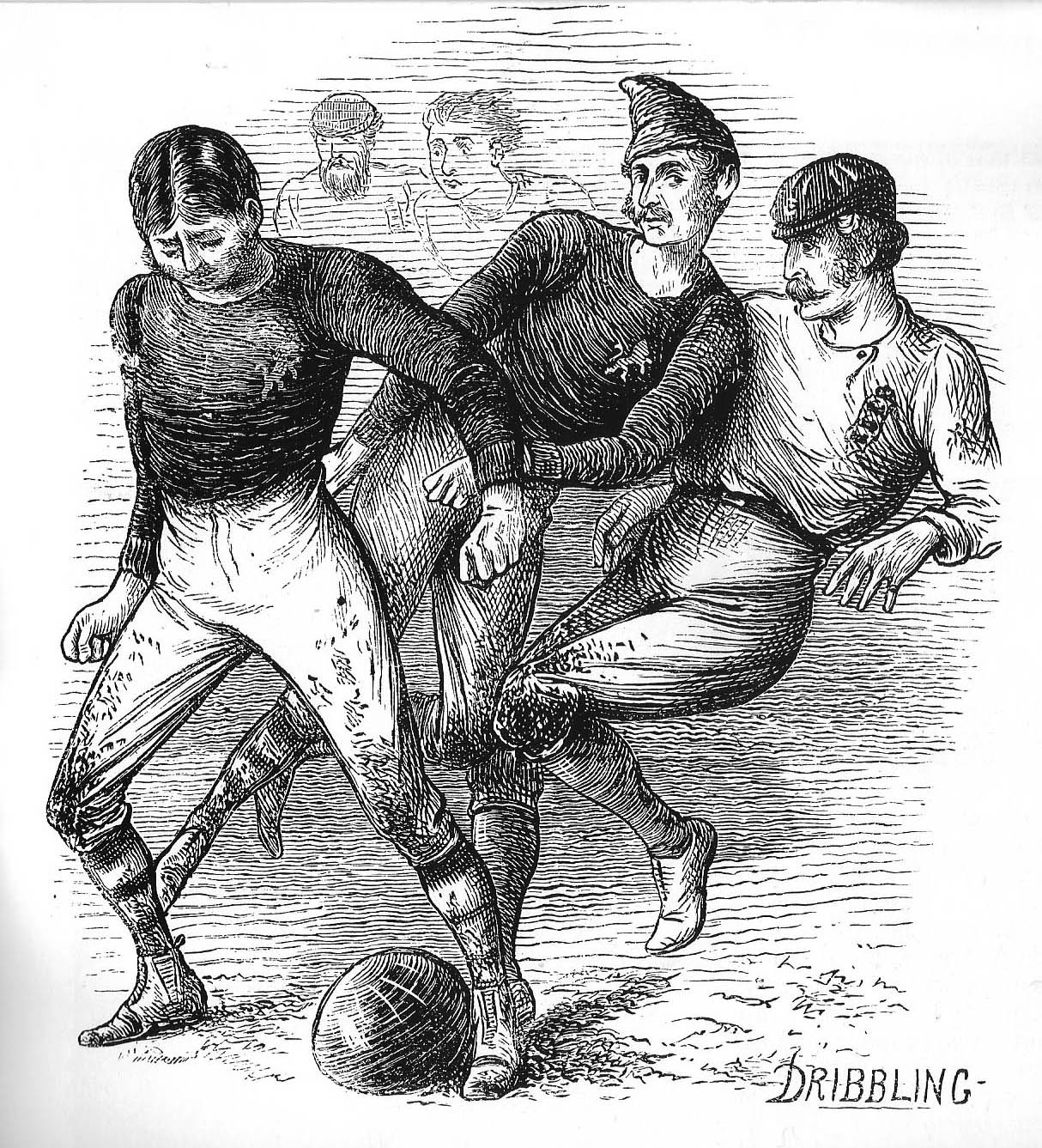
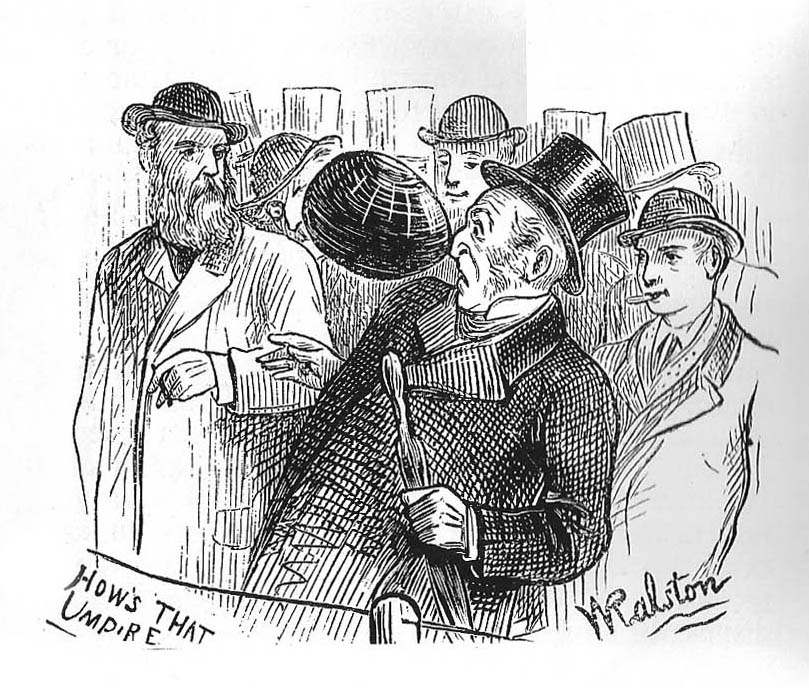
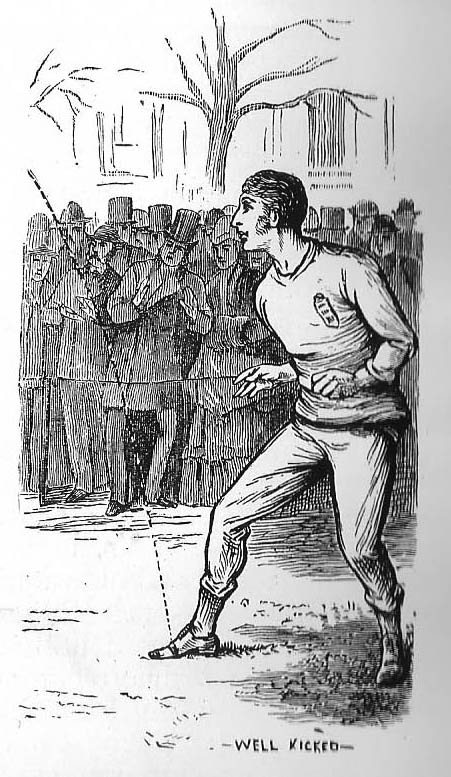
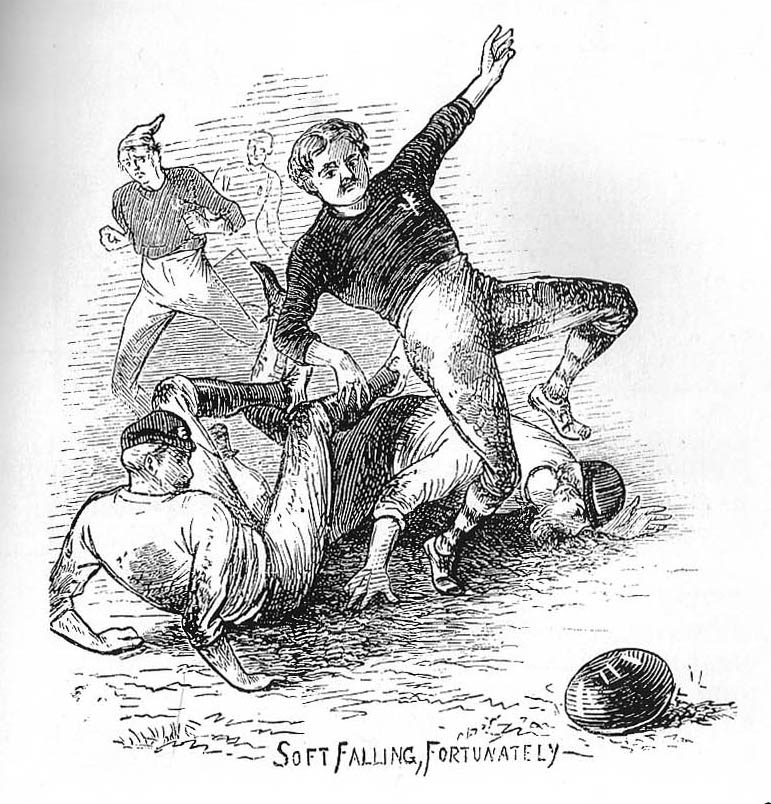
Illustrations of the first international at Hamilton Crescent, by William Ralston.

This season saw the first official international match take place against England. Whilst a series of "England v Scotland" matches organised by C. W. Alcock had taken in London over the previous two years, these matches were never considered truly representative, with the Scottish sides being composed almost entirely of London residents. In 1872, Queen's Park, as Scotland's leading club, took it upon themselves to organise what has entered the history books as the first "official" international, despite the fact there was as yet no Scottish Football Association to sanction it. Appropriately enough, the match was arranged for St Andrew's Day, and the West of Scotland Cricket Club's ground at Hamilton Crescent in Partick was selected as the venue. A crowd of approximately 4,000 people attended on the day, although the time of the match had been delayed by fog.

The Scottish eleven was selected by captain and goalkeeper Robert Gardner and was drawn entirely from Queen's Park members, although some played with other clubs as well. The dark blue shirts which would become synonymous with the national team were worn on this first occasion because they were at that time the colours of Queen's Park. The English wore white shirts. The English wore caps, while the Scots wore red cowls. The match itself contrasted the dribbling style then popular in England with the Scots' passing football, but finished goalless. The Scots had a goal disallowed in the first half after the umpires decided that the ball had cleared the tape which was used before crossbars were introduced. The latter part of the match saw the Scots defence under pressure by the heavier English forwards. The Scots played two full backs, two half backs and six forwards. The English played only one full back, one half back and eight forwards. Since three defenders were required for a ball played to be onside, the English system was virtually a ready-made offside trap.

The return fixture the following March marked the first official meeting of the sides in England, and again took place at a cricket ground, The Oval, with the English adopting Scotland's 2-2-6 formation. The severely limited funds available to the fledgling SFA meant they were only able to finance rail fares to London for eight players, so the team was augmented with three Anglo-Scots who had appeared in the earlier unofficial series, Lord Kinnaird, John Blackburn and Henry Renny-Tailyour. The latter had the honour of scoring Scotland's first international goal, but the match ended in a 4–2 defeat.

=== Results ===
Date	Venue	Opponents	Score	Competition	Scotland scorer(s)
30 November 1872	Hamilton Crescent, Partick	England	0–0	Friendly	
8 March 1873	Kennington Oval, London	England	2–4	Friendly	Henry Renny-Tailyour, William Gibb
