= Robert Smith (footballer, born 1848) =

Scottish footballer (1848–1914)

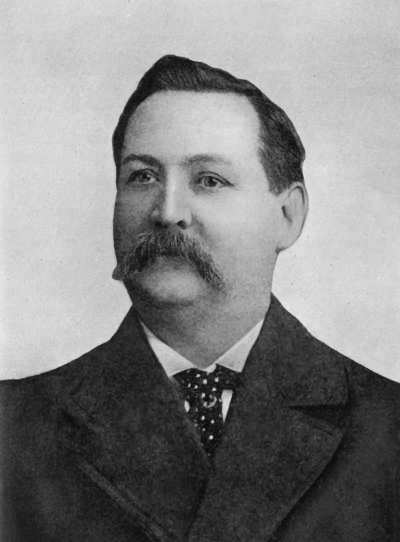

Personal information
- Full name: Robert Smith
- Date of birth: 1 May 1848
- Place of birth: Aberdeen, Scotland
- Date of death: 3 June 1914 (aged 66)
- Place of death: Chicago, Illinois, USA
- Position: Forward

Senior career*
| Years | Team | Apps | (Gls) |
| 1867–1878 | Queen's Park | | |
- South Norwood

International career
| 1870–1871 | Scotland (Unofficial) | 3 | (0) |
| 1872–1873 | Scotland | 2 | (0) |
- * Club domestic league appearances and goals

Robert Smith (1 May 1848 – 3 June 1914) was a Scottish footballer who played for Scotland against England in the first official international matches in 1872 and 1873, as well as three appearances in the earlier unofficial matches. He was a member of the Queen's Park and South Norwood clubs, and was prominent in the early history of Queen's Park.

== Early life ==
Smith was born in Aberdeen, the third son of Robert Smith and Barbara Abercrombie. His father was the gardener to the Earl of Fife, who was then based at Mar Lodge on Royal Deeside. His father was later the head gardener on the Duke's estate at Innes House, near Elgin. Robert Smith then attended Fordyce Academy, where he was educated until 1864.

On leaving school, he moved to Glasgow to work for the publisher William Mackenzie, the publisher of the Glasgow Post Office Directory, before working as a cashier for shipping insurance brokers Hutchinson & Brown.

== Football career ==
Smith was one of the founder members of the Queen's Park club, based in Glasgow. At the inaugural meeting of the club, held on 9 July 1867, he was listed as the club's first captain and treasurer.

In his "Scottish Football Reminiscences and Sketches" written in 1890, David Bone describes Smith thus:

not by any means an impulsive player, but took in the situation quietly; and while no man ever worked harder in the field, or did more for a club, he was not what could be called a brilliant forward. (He) did well in the (1872) international, and considerably helped the eleven to make a drawn battle of it.

In 1869, Smith's employers had gone out of business, so he moved to London to take up a post with Sir Charles Price & Co., oil merchants. Although he retained his membership of Queen's Park, he also became a member of South Norwood, for whom he played in the FA Cup. A Scottish XI had played an English XI in the first (unofficial) international match in March, which ended in a 1–1 draw. After criticism that the first match featured only London-based Scotsmen, the organiser, C. W. Alcock, had written to Scottish newspapers in an effort to attract players from north of the border. As one of the few active football clubs in Scotland at this time, Queen's Park decided to send a representative but were put off by the cost of sending a player to London; as a result, Smith was nominated to represent the club.

The match ended in a 1–0 victory for the English, with the only goal coming from R. S. F. Walker. Despite further criticism in Scotland of the lack of players from outside London, further matches were arranged twice a season; Smith retained his place for the matches played on 25 February 1871 and 18 November 1871, being listed as captain in the November 1871 match. Smith, along with his younger brother James, was named amongst 16 selected players in the publicity for the match played on 24 February 1872, but neither actually played.

In November 1872, the first officially recognised football international was arranged between Scotland and England; unlike the earlier representative matches, all of which had been played at the Kennington Oval in London, this match was played at West of Scotland Cricket Club's ground at Hamilton Crescent in Partick, Glasgow. The match was organised by the Queen's Park club (the Scottish Football Association was not founded until the following year), who decided that only Queen's Park members should be selected. Smith started the match as one of six forwards, but at some point in the match, probably at half-time, he switched positions with Robert Gardner, and played the remainder of the match in goal.

Smith's brother, James, played in the match on 30 November 1872 at half-back; thus, he and Robert were the first pair of brothers to play together at international level. Scotland played a 2–2–6 formation (with two backs and two-half-backs) while England favoured a more attacking 1–1–8 formation with only two defenders; despite this, the match ended in a 0–0 draw.

The re-match was arranged to be played at the Kennington Oval on 8 March 1873. Although Queen's Park had made a substantial profit on the first match, Scotland were only able to afford to send seven players to London. These players were supplemented by Smith and three other London-based Scotsmen: John Edward Blackburn and Henry Renny-Tailyour, both with the Royal Engineers, and Arthur Kinnaird. This time England lined up in a similar 2–2–6 to the Scots. England took a 2–0 lead before the Scots drew level on 70 minutes; England scored twice more late on to make the final score 4–2.

== Life after football ==
In 1873, Smith emigrated to Almy, Wyoming Territory to take up a position as cashier with the Rocky Mountain Coal & Iron Co. Three years later, he briefly took up silver mining in Utah, before returning to Wyoming in late 1877, to settle in Green River. At Green River, he opened a general store, before entering politics to become a member of the Wyoming House of Representatives.

He returned to Scotland to marry Georgina Greig Kidd (born 1853) in Glasgow on 22 July 1879.

In 1880, he launched the weekly Sweetwater Gazette, the first newspaper in Sweetwater County. In 1887, he moved to Rock Springs, changing the name of the newspaper to the Rock Springs Miner. In Rock Springs, he was an active member of the community, and played a major role in the development of Sweetwater County. In 1888, he was elected as the county's representative in the Wyoming Territorial Council, serving for one year. He continued his involvement in local politics, and in 1902 was appointed chief clerk to Wyoming House of Representatives.

In 1903, he sold the newspaper and took up a post in Indian Territory (now part of Oklahoma), based at Muskogee becoming head of the lease department, intended to help Native Americans to sell the rights to exploit the oil and gas resources on their land. By 1905, he had set up his own business selling these concessions himself.

In 1914, Smith was taken ill and travelled to Chicago for medical treatment, where he died on 3 June.

== Notes ==
A. The match between Scotland and England on 30 November 1872 was the first officially recognised international football match. Apart from James and Robert Smith, none of the other players were brothers. Thus they were the first pair of brothers to play international football.
