= James Smith (footballer, born 1844) =

Scottish footballer (1844–1876)

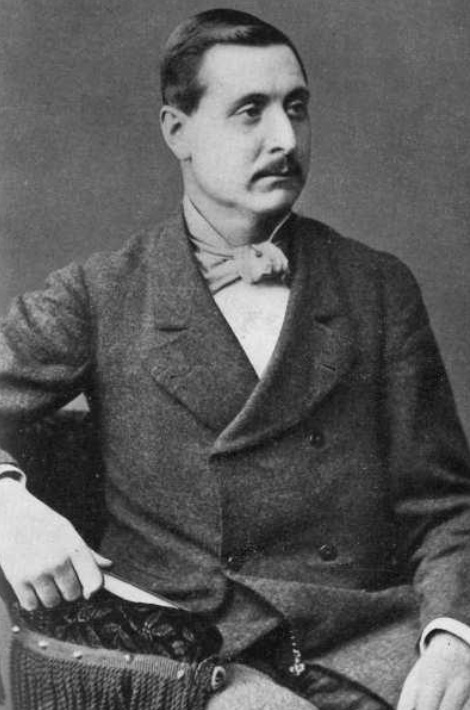
- James Smith - Scottish footballer

Personal information
- Date of birth: Summer 1844
- Place of birth: Aberdeen, Scotland
- Date of death: 20 September 1876 (aged 32)
- Place of death: Urquhart, Moray, Scotland
- Position: Defender

Senior career*
Years	Team	Apps	(Gls)
1867–1870	Queen's Park		
1870–1876	South Norwood		

International career
1872	Scotland	1	(0)
- * Club domestic league appearances and goals

James Smith (summer 1844 – 20 September 1876) was a Scottish footballer who played for Scotland against England in the first official international match in 1872. He was a member of the Queen's Park and South Norwood clubs and was prominent in the early history of Queen's Park.

== Early life ==
Smith was born in Aberdeen in the summer of 1844, the son of Robert Smith and Barbara Abercrombie. His father was the gardener to the Earl of Fife, who was then based at Mar Lodge on Royal Deeside. His father was later the head gardener on the Duke's estate at Innes House, near Elgin. James Smith then attended Fordyce Academy.

== Football career ==
Smith was one of the founder members of the Queen's Park club, based in Glasgow.

In his "Scottish Football Reminiscences and Sketches" written in 1890, David Bone describes Smith thus:

The least known, perhaps, of the original international men, but one whose name will ever be honoured by many of the older school of players, and local Queen's Park members, is Mr. James Smith, who died some years ago in London. Mr. Smith was, in conjunction with his brother Robert, early associated with the game in Scotland, and was an original member of the Queen's Park. Mr. Archibald Rae, the first secretary of the Scottish Football Association, and at one time an active member of the Queen's Park (and a beautiful dribbler in his day), tells an amusing anecdote of Smith, while playing against the Hamilton Club, leaping on the top of a hedge to win a touch-down, which in those days counted a point in the game. This entirely coincided with poor Smith's play, as he was sometimes very impetuous.

By November 1870, Smith had moved to London and, although he retained his membership of Queen's Park, was also a member of South Norwood, for whom he played in the FA Cup. Smith, along with his elder brother Robert, was named amongst 16 selected players in the publicity for the unofficial international match played on 24 February 1872, but neither actually played.

In November 1872, the first officially recognised football international was arranged between Scotland and England; unlike the earlier representative matches, all of which had been played at the Kennington Oval in London, this match was played at West of Scotland Cricket Club's ground at Hamilton Crescent in Partick, Glasgow. The match was organised by the Queen's Park club (the Scottish Football Association was not founded until the following year), who decided that only Queen's Park members should be selected. Smith started the match as a half-back.

Smith's brother, Robert, played in the match on 30 November 1872 as one of six forwards; thus, he and Robert were the first pair of brothers to play together at international level. Scotland played a 2–2–6 formation (with two backs and two half-backs) while England favoured a more attacking 1–1–8 formation with only two defenders; despite this, the match ended in a 0–0 draw.

== Life after football ==
By profession, Smith was a salesman for artists' supplies.

He died at the age of 32, at his parents' home at Urquhart in Morayshire on 20 September 1876 from a stroke, after a long illness.

== Notes ==
A. The match between Scotland and England on 30 November 1872 was the first officially recognised international football match. Apart from James and Robert Smith, none of the other players were brothers. Thus they were the first pair of brothers to play international football.
