= Charles Chenery =

English footballer and cricketer

Charles John Chenery (1 January 1850 – 17 April 1928) was a footballer who played for England in the first international match against Scotland. He also played cricket for Surrey and Northants.

== Football career ==
Chenery was born in Lambourn, Berkshire, the son of George Chenery and Sophia Atkins. He was educated at the Marlborough Royal Free Grammar School, although the family also spent three or four years in Australia in the early 1860s. In October 1867, after leaving school, he became an articled clerk with Henry Rose of Great George Street in Westminster.

He is first recorded in the sporting press in February 1868 when he ran in a Thames Rowing Club cross-country event with his friend Frederick Chappell.

He played football for both the original Crystal Palace club and the Wanderers. His first recorded games for these clubs were in the autumn of 1870. He was selected for the "England" side that played an unofficial international match against a Scottish side in February 1872. He was retained for the first official international match, which took place on 30 November 1872 at West of Scotland Cricket Club's ground at Hamilton Crescent in Partick, Scotland. The match finished in a 0–0 draw, with Chenery playing as one of seven or eight forwards.

He and Harwood Greenhalgh were the only two players who were recalled for the return match at the Kennington Oval, London on 8 March 1873, which resulted in a 4–2 victory for England, with Chenery, playing at inside right, scoring the fourth goal. Chenery's Crystal Palace teammate Alexander Morten played in goal for England.

He made his third and final England appearance (again against Scotland) in a 2–1 defeat on 7 March 1874 and was the only player to appear in each of England's first three internationals. He describes his visit to Scotland for the game in his diary covering the period 1 January 1874 to 19 June 1875. This is the earliest known diary of an international footballer.

Although not appearing in any of the Wanderers' five FA Cup Final teams in the 1870s, he did serve as their secretary in 1871. He made four appearances for them in the 1876/77 season after the original Crystal Palace club had folded.

He also played occasional games for other clubs including the Barnes Club, Upton Park, Faversham, and Harrow Chequers as well as representing Surrey, London and the South.

== Cricket career ==
He played cricket for Surrey in 1872 and 1873 as a right-hand batsman and right-arm fast bowler. His top score was 40 not out at The Oval against Kent in August 1872. He was described in 1873 as "a careful an trustworthy batsmen and perhaps the best amateur in the Surrey team".

He also played for Northants before that county was elevated to first-class status.

== Later life ==
Chenery emigrated to Australia in 1878, settling in Mansfield, Victoria, where he had relatives. He married Priscilla Swan in 1890, and they had three sons. He died at Mansfield on 17 April 1928.
