= South Norwood F.C. =

- Full name: South Norwood Football Club
- Nickname(s): the Norwoodians
- Founded: 1871
- Dissolved: c.1881
- Ground: Cricket Ground, South Norwood
- President: Hon. Captain Moreton, R.N.
Home colours

South Norwood F.C. was an amateur football club from South Norwood in London.

== History ==
The club was founded in October 1871, charging members a 5s annual subscription, and with Captain Moreton (brother of the Earl of Ducie) agreeing to be club president (and occasional player). Its first public appearance was an open training session at the ground, showing that the club had recruited "some well known amateur runners".

=== FA Cup history ===
The club entered the FA Cup for each of the years from 1872 to 1879, reaching the Second Round on five occasions:

- 1872–73
  - Round 1: Barnes (A) won 1–0
  - Round 2: Windsor Home Park (n) replay ordered (see below)
  - Round 2 replay: Windsor Home Park (A) lost 3–0

The club's first tie at Barnes was "looked upon as a certainty for Barnes, as their opponents’ club is quite a modern one", but South Norwood won with a goal from G.V.Walshe after about ten minutes.

The second round tie with Windsor Home Park, at the Kennington Oval, proved controversial, as both sides claimed to have won 1–0. Windsor Home Park claimed the South Norwood goal was the result of a handball, with which both umpires agreed, and South Norwood claimed that the Windsor Home Park goal the result of Home Park taking a corner that ought to have been a goal-kick. As at the time the referee's decision was subject to an appeal, the Football Association ordered a replay, which Home Park won easily.

- 1873–74
  - Round 1: Cambridge University (A) lost 1–0
- 1874–75
  - Round 1: Pilgrims (H) lost 3–1

The match had elements of controversy, as Pilgrims' second goal was considered by the home side to be offside, but the Pilgrims umpire - "whose defective vision we deplore" - claimed not to have noticed any infringement, and the third goal allegedly cleared the tape.

- 1875–76
  - Round 1: Clydesdale Walkover
  - Round 2: Swifts (H) lost 5–0

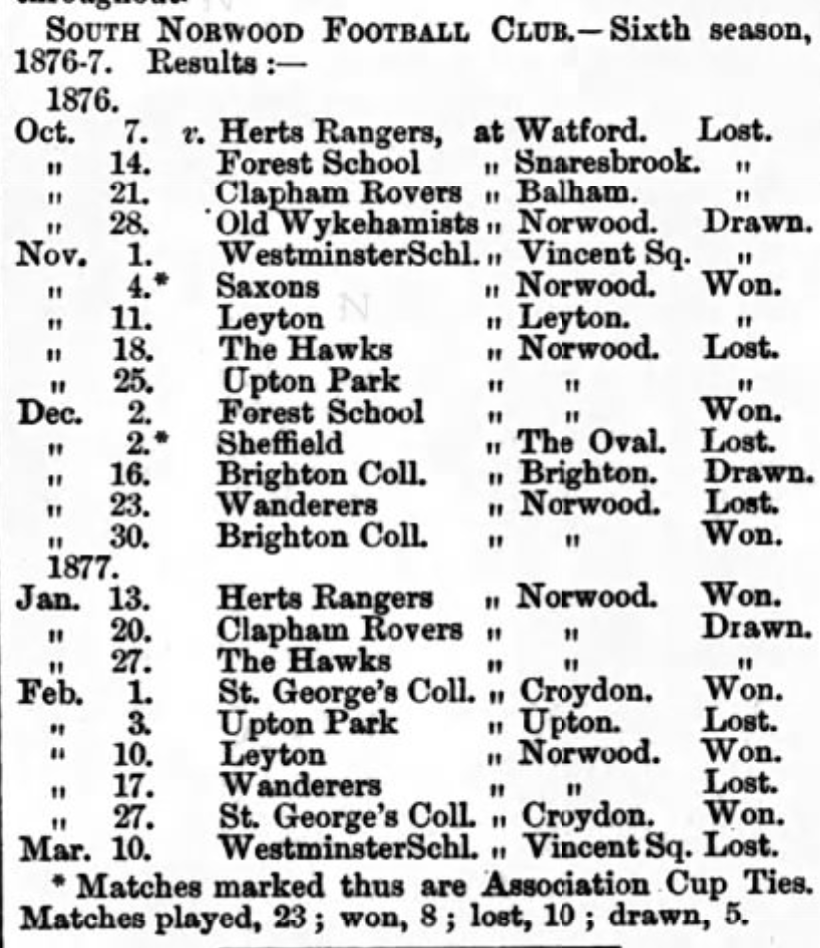
The results of the South Norwood football club in 1876–77, from the Norwood News of 14 April 1877.

- 1876–77
  - Round 1: Saxons (H) won 4–1
  - Round 2: Sheffield (n) lost 7–0

The Saxons match was an acrimonious one. The Saxons were said to be playing "on the win tie or wrangle principal", and were "apparently intent upon displaying their powers of polite repartee to make up for their deficiency in the knowledge of the Association rules." The approach did bring the Saxons the benefit of a goal which, according to the spectators, struck the tape and went over, but after the Saxons players "were prepared to take their affidavits that it went under", W.H. White, the South Norwood captain, conceded the goal. It availed the Saxons nothing as South Norwood were already four goals to the good. Frank Haslam, the Saxons' captain, complained that South Norwood kept interrupting the game by claiming offside, and blaming White for "a temper and disposition which totally unfits him for the football field"; however the South Norwood secretary C.E. Leeds complained in turn about the Saxons players regularly disputing refereeing decisions, often in unison, and dismissed Saxons as "comparatively obscure".

The Sheffield match was played at the Kennington Oval in a rainstorm; the score was 2–0 to Sheffield at half-time but the Yorkshire side ran riot in the second half, only Edward Ram distinguishing himself for South Norwood.

- 1877–78
  - Round 1: Reading (A) lost 2–0
- 1878–79
  - Round 1: Leyton Walkover
  - Round 2: Cambridge University (A) lost 3–0
- 1879–80
  - Round 1: Brentwood (H) won 4–2
  - Round 2: Clapham Rovers (H) lost 4–1

=== End of club ===
The club was wound up during 1881, the last recorded matches being in February; a 7–0 defeat to Westminster School, a 3–2 win at Acton, and a 9–0 defeat at Barnes - a sign of the growing apathy was that only 10 men played at Westminster and Acton, and only 7 at Barnes. At a meeting of the South Norwood Cricket Club in September 1881, the past and present members of the football club presented a silver salver to C. E. Leeds, the long-serving secretary, as a wedding gift, and hoped that the football club would be "resuscitated"; the hope was a forlorn one.

== Colours ==
The club gave its colours as "broad black and red bars", as distinct from the narrow hoops that were more normal in the 1870s.

== Ground ==
The club originally used a field alongside Portland Road (opposite the Spread Eagle pub) and in 1875 it moved the cricket ground, also near Portland Road.

== Famous players ==
Brothers Robert Smith and James Smith played for the club, including in the FA Cup. They appeared together for Scotland in the first officially recognised football international match in November 1872.

England international, William Lindsay also played for South Norwood at some time during his career.

Edward Ram, who won the Cup with Clapham Rovers in 1880, played for the club in 1876–77.
