= John Brockbank =

English footballer

John Brockbank (22 August 1848 – 4 February 1896) was an English footballer who played for England as a forward in the first international match against Scotland.

== Career ==
Brockbank was born in Whitehaven, Cumberland and was educated at Shrewsbury School whom he represented at "soccer" before going up to Trinity College, Cambridge, where he graduated as B.A. in 1873. He won his solitary England cap in England's first ever international match against Scotland on 30 November 1872.

He subsequently earned his "Blues" appearing for Cambridge University against Oxford University in 1874 and 1875, having previously played in representational matches for London.

He also played cricket at club level, appearing for the M.C.C. against his university in May 1874. He played county cricket for Staffordshire, Cumberland, Cambridgeshire, Brecknockshire, Herefordshire, and Shropshire when he appeared in a single two-day match in 1870 while playing at club level for Wem.

By profession he was an actor, adopting the stage name John Benn Brockbank. He died in Fulham on 4 February 1896, aged 47 years.

His grandson, Michael White, also played cricket for Cambridge University and for Northamptonshire in the 1940s.
