= Alex Rhind =

Scottish footballer

Personal information
- Full name: Alexander Rhind
- Date of birth: 20 September 1849
- Place of birth: Aberdeen, Scotland
- Date of death: 22 January 1922 (aged 72)
- Place of death: Glasgow, Scotland
- Position: Forward

Senior career*
| Years | Team | Apps | (Gls) |
- Queen's Park

International career
| 1872 | Scotland | 1 | (0) |
- * Club domestic league appearances and goals

Alexander Rhind (20 September 1849 – 22 January 1922) was a Scottish footballer who played as a forward.

== Career ==
Born in Aberdeen, Rhind played club football for Queen's Park, and he made only one appearance for Scotland in 1872 during the first official international football match. He later served as president of Caledonian.
