= 1830s in association football =

The following are events in the 1830s decade which are relevant to the development of association football. All events happened in English football unless specified otherwise.

== Events ==
- 1835 – Section 72 of the Highway Act 1835 expressly forbade any person playing at football (or any other game) on any part of the defined highways to the annoyance of passengers. Anyone guilty to be fined a sum not exceeding forty shillings (two pounds sterling).
- 1838 – A pupil at Rugby School called Jem Mackie (1821–1867) became noted for his “running in” ability and this is understood to have been the equivalent of try scoring, which is evidence of a distinct handling game.
- 1839 – A former Rugby School pupil, Albert Pell (1820–1907), began to organise football matches at Cambridge University and is credited with introducing the game of rugby union, which was then simply called football. Pell describes in his autobiography the difficulties of setting up a team.
- 1839 – It is claimed that the foundation of Barnes Rugby Football Club was in 1839 but without actual evidence. If the claim is true, Barnes is the world's oldest football club (all codes).

== Births ==
- 15 November 1831 – Alexander Morten (d. 1900), England international captain and goalkeeper.
- 16 April 1833 – John Malcolm (d. 1902), Scotland international in the first unofficial England v Scotland match

== Bibliography ==
- Sanders, Richard (2009). Beastly Fury – The Strange Birth of British Football. London: Transworld. ISBN 978-0-55-381935-9.
