= Harwood Greenhalgh =

English footballer

Ernest Harwood Greenhalgh
Personal information
- Full name: Ernest Harwood Greenhalgh
- Date of birth: 6 March 1849
- Place of birth: Mansfield
- Date of death: 11 July 1922 (aged 73)
- Place of death: Nottingham
- Position: Defender

Senior career*
Years	Team	Apps	(Gls)
1867–1883	Notts County		

International career
1872–1873	England	2	(0)
- * Club domestic league appearances and goals

Ernest Harwood Greenhalgh (6 March 1849 – 11 July 1922) was an English footballer who played for England as a full back in the first international match against Scotland.

== Playing career ==
Greenhalgh was born in Mansfield and played for Notts County, before the foundation of The Football League, from 1869 to 1883 making over 147 appearances as a defender and was made captain in 1872. His arrival at Notts County in 1869 helped to "greatly improve (their) results, due mainly to his great influence and leadership".

He was one of only two players not from a London-based or university team to be chosen by the England selectors for the match against Scotland on 30 November 1872. In this match he played as the only full back in a 1-1-8 or 1-2-7 formation and was Notts County's first international representative. From the eleven who played in the first international, the England selectors only recalled Greenhalgh and Charles Chenery for the return match on 8 March 1873, which resulted in a 4–2 victory for England.

In 1882–83 his leadership helped County to reach the FA Cup semi-finals where they lost to Old Etonians by 2–1 at the Kennington Oval.

== Later career ==
After retiring from playing in 1883, Greenhalgh continued to play an important part in the development of football, helping to found Greenhalgh's F.C. in Mansfield. He was also the owner of Field Mill in Mansfield which was the home of Mansfield Mechanics F.C., until becoming the home of Mansfield Town in 1916.

== Personal life ==
Greenhalgh was married to Kate. His occupation was as a cotton doubler employing 320 women, 50 men and 8 boys (1881) and later as a yarn agent and salesman.
