= West of Scotland Cricket Club =

West of Scotland

Personnel
- Captain: (England) James Fennah
- Coach: Vacant

Team information
- Colours
- Founded: 1862
- Home ground: Hamilton Crescent
- Capacity: 4.000

History
- First-class debut: in 1891 at Hamilton Crescent
- SNCL Champions wins: 1
- SNCL Premier League Champions wins: 1
- Scottish Cup Winners wins: 2
- Western Union League Champions wins: 10
- Official website: http://www.westofscotlandcricketclub.co.uk

The West of Scotland Cricket Club is a cricket club based in Glasgow, Scotland. The club's home ground is Hamilton Crescent, located in the Partick area of Glasgow's West End.

West of Scotland are traditionally one of the working class cricket clubs in Glasgow. Many famous players have both played at the ground and for the club, including Scottish internationalists opening batsman Douglas Lockhart and bowler John Blain. Lockhart was a former Oxford UCCE player and having had trials with Derbyshire whilst Blain played professional county cricket for Northamptonshire and Yorkshire before working with West as the club's coach.

== History ==
West of Scotland Cricket Club was founded in 1862 as a result of a meeting which took place at the then Clarence Hotel in George Square, Glasgow, between a group of local businessmen and players from the Clutha Cricket Club, who had used the northern part of Hamilton Crescent for matches prior to West's inception.

One of the businessmen present was Colonel David Carrick Buchanan who became the first President of the club and who continued in this role until his death in 1903. Sir David was devoted to the sport of cricket and was patron of a number of clubs, providing invaluable financial assistance to them.

The name, West of Scotland Cricket Club was coined by one John McNeill who was very ambitious for the club, and who envisaged it becoming the MCC of Scotland. All-England Elevens were invited to the club and other matches of a similar nature arranged, which included the first ever visit of an Australian team to Scotland in 1878. In the club's early decades, they also founded the rugby union team West of Scotland F.C. (now based at Milngavie). In 1872 the Club played host to the first ever international football match, a meeting between Scotland and England, held at the Hamilton Crescent ground and attended by 4,000 spectators.

Tours of England were also undertaken and it was during the first match of one such Tour in July 1885 that a West cricketer achieved a world record which stood for 12 years. The match was against Priory Park C.C. (Chichester) during which Mr. J. S. Carrick batted for two days, achieving a score of 419 not out.

In 1891, Dr. W.G. Grace brought a team to Partick and won by an innings and 33 runs. By 1922 the club had a membership of over 500, seating accommodation for 3,500 and a turnstile at every entrance. A reconstructed pavilion was opened in April 1923 by the then President, Mr. Peter Dawson and a new scoreboard built in 1936.

Following damage sustained during World War II extensive repairs were made to both the pavilion and ground which included the acquisition of turf from Renfrew Golf Course.

Between 1965 and 1970 Scotland played matches at Hamilton Crescent against New Zealand, the West Indies, MCC and Ireland. In August 1975 a benefit match was held for the then Club Professional, Salahuddin, and those taking part included Colin Cowdrey, Mike Denness, Intikhab Alam, Majid Khan, Asif Iqbal and Sir Garfield Sobers.

Ongoing improvements to the ground and buildings enabled West to continue hosting Senior and International matches and a visit by a Pakistan touring side in 1982 was followed by a series of Benson and Hedges One Day matches between Scotland and Gloucestershire, Leicestershire, Yorkshire, Derbyshire and Northamptonshire. In July 1989 3,500 spectators watched Scotland play Australia. Following this, Scotland also played Essex and Kent at Hamilton Crescent.

West has become a regular venue for the Scottish Cup Final, held at the end of August and the tradition of hosting Representative Fixtures has continued with five European Championship Matches being held at Hamilton Crescent during 2000, namely Holland v. Ireland, Gibraltar v. Portugal, England Cricket Board XI v. Scotland, France v. Greece and Holland v. Denmark.

== Youth System ==
The Indoor School was opened in February 1957 and was the first of its kind in Scotland. It has produced an array of youngsters who have come through the ranks and now play a notable level of cricket. Moneeb Iqbal now plays at Durham and made his first class debut in 2006. In this game Iqbal took a stunning catch on the deep square leg boundary and it has been said that Iqbal is a favourite of the then Durham captain Michael Hussey.

Another product of the West Youth system is Craig Wright, the ex-Captain of the Scottish national team. Wright left West of Scotland for Carlton CC due to work commitments. He has now moved back west to the Greenock CC all-stars and captained them to SNCL Premier League Success in 2007.

Through the work of the club's Junior Convener, Jim Young, and voluntary coaches, the club has produced many players and over the past three years the recent coach, John Blain instigated a Development XI to introduce them into senior cricket.
