= Hamilton Crescent =

Cricket ground in Glasgow, Scotland

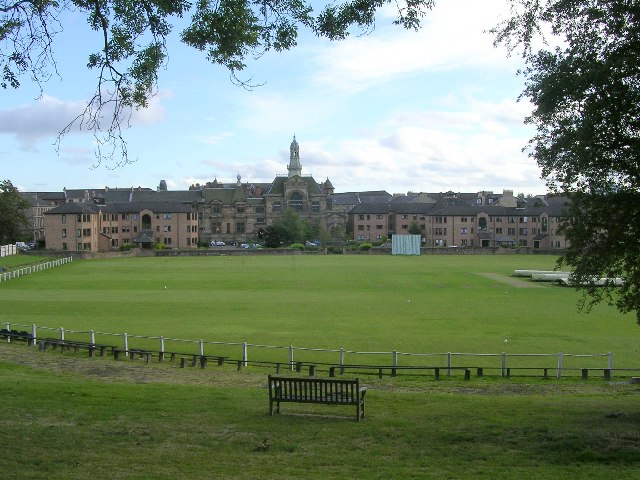
- Cricket Ground in 2005
- Interactive map of Hamilton Crescent

Ground information
- Location: Partick, Glasgow
- Country: Scotland
- Coordinates: 55°52′21″N 04°18′32″W
- Establishment: 1862
- Capacity: 4,000
- End names
- Pavilion End; Burgh Hall Street End

Team information
West of Scotland	(1862–present)
- As of 3 February 2009; Source: Ground profile

Hamilton Crescent is a cricket ground in the Partick area of Glasgow, Scotland, which is the home of the West of Scotland Cricket Club. It was previously also used for association football and hosted the first international football match in 1872, between Scotland and England.

== Cricket ==
Cricket has been played at Hamilton Crescent since at least 1862, when it hosted a Gentlemen v Players fixture. Beginning in the 1870s it regularly hosted touring Marylebone Cricket Club teams as well as tour matches against visiting international sides such as Australia, South Africa, New Zealand. The inaugural first-class cricket match at the ground was a Scotland versus Ireland fixture in 1911. In total Hamilton Crescent hosted 20 first-class matches between 1911 and 1994. International tournaments played at the ground include the 1994 Triple Crown Tournament and the 2000 and 2006 European Cricket Championships.

== Rugby union ==
Hamilton Crescent hosted a rugby union international when Scotland and Wales drew their match in the 1885 Home Nations Championship.

== Association football ==
Hamilton Crescent hosted the first international football match, between Scotland and England, played on 30 November 1872, which ended in a goalless draw, and was watched by a crowd of 4,000. A plaque on the wall of the clubhouse was placed to commemorate the match in 2002 by Mr John C McGinn, President of the Scottish Football Association.

Further international matches were held here in 1874 and 1876, before being moved to the first Hampden Park. The 1877 Scottish Cup Final was also held at Hamilton Crescent.
