= Freeth =

Freeth is a surname. Notable people with the surname include:

- Andrew Freeth (1912–1986), British painter and etcher
- Ben Freeth (born 1971), Zimbabwean human rights activist
- Denzil Freeth (1924–2010), English politician
- Evelyn Freeth (1846–1911), English civil servant
- Francis Arthur Freeth (1884–1970), British industrial chemist
- George Freeth (1883–1919), American surfer
- Gordon Freeth (1914–2001), Australian politician
- James Freeth (1786–1867), British Army general and Quartermaster-General to the Forces
- James Freeth (cricketer) (born 1974), English former cricketer
- John Freeth (1731–1808), English innkeeper, poet and songwriter, owner of Freeth's Coffee House
- Martin Freeth (1944–2021), a filmmaker for the British Broadcasting Corporation
- Naomi Freeth, a stage name of Naomi Phoenix (fl. 1997–2002), English singer-songwriter
- Robert Freeth (1886–1979), Irish Anglican priest and educator, Archdeacon of Perth, Western Australia
- Rodger Freeth (1950–1993), New Zealand rally co-driver
- Thomas Freeth (1912–1994), English stained glass artist
- Zahra Freeth (1924/1925–2015), British writer

== See also ==
- Freeth Bay, Enderby Land Antarctica
