= Edward Ravenshaw =

Association football player (1854–1880)

Edward Vincent Ravenshaw (30 July 1854 – 23 May 1880) was an amateur footballer who played for the Scotland XI against England in the last of the representative matches played in February 1872. He went on to become a tea planter in India, where he drowned trying to save the life of a friend.

== Family and education ==
Ravenshaw was born in Mortlake, Surrey, on 30 July 1854, the son of George Chandler Ravenshaw and Eliza Willock. His father was educated at Haileybury College and was employed by the East India Company. His mother was the daughter of Sir Henry Willock, who was the chairman of the East India Company in 1844–45. His uncle Thomas was the founder of Ravenshaw College in Odisha state, India.

Having first attended Bromsgrove School, he joined Charterhouse School in 1866 where he showed an aptitude for various sports. He was a member of the school cricket team in 1871 and 1872 and of the school football XI in 1871–72.

== Football ==
On 24 February 1872, he was asked to represent "Scotland" in the last pseudo-international match against an English XI, organised by Charles W. Alcock. The Scottish XI was made up from players from London and the Home Counties with "Scottish connections". Ravenshaw had attended the match to watch Old Carthusians Thomas Hooman and Charles Nepean play for England and Scotland respectively, and (despite having no family links to Scotland) was pressed into service by the Scottish captain Montague Muir Mackenzie (also an Old Carthusian) to replace Quintin Hogg who had been injured shortly before the match. The match ended in a 1–0 victory to the English with a goal from Charles Clegg.

== Later life and death ==
He left Charterhouse in the summer of 1872 and became a clerk in the Old Bank at Malvern, Worcestershire. He subsequently became a tea planter in Cachar, India.

He drowned in the Katakhal River, while attempting to save a friend's life near Julnacherra in Assam on 23 May 1880.
