= George Gordon =

George Gordon may refer to:

== By career ==
=== Military ===
- George Henry Gordon (1823–1886), U.S. Army general
- George Gordon (Civil War general) (1836–1911), Civil War General, Ku Klux Klan leader and U.S. Representative from Tennessee
- George Grant Gordon (1836–1912), British Army officer and courtier

=== Political figures ===
- George Gordon of Tulloch, commissioner for Aberdeen (Parliament of Scotland constituency)
- Sir George Gordon (died 1690), commissioner for Banffshire (Parliament of Scotland constituency)
- George Gordon (died 1691), burgh commissioner for Dornoch (Parliament of Scotland constituency)
- Lord George Gordon (1751–1793), British politician
- George Newcombe Gordon (1879–1949), Canadian Member of Parliament and cabinet minister
- George Gordon (Ontario politician) (1888–1971), Member of Provincial Parliament
- George Gordon (Canadian politician) (1865–1942), senator from Ontario
- George William Gordon (1820–1865), Jamaican politician
- George A. Gordon (1885–1959), American attorney and diplomat
- George Anderson Gordon (1830–1872), American politician from Georgia
- George John Robert Gordon (1812−1902), British diplomat

=== Religious figures ===
- George N. Gordon (1822–1861), Protestant missionary to the South Pacific
- George Gordon (priest) (1760–1845), Dean of Exeter and of Lincoln

=== Sciences ===
- George Gordon (botanist) (1806–1879), gardener and horticultural writer
- George Gordon (horticulturalist) (1841–1914), British horticulturalist and writer, awarded the Victoria Medal of Honour
- George Gordon (engineer) (1829–1907), Scottish Australian civil engineer
- George Phineas Gordon (1821–1878), American inventor, printer and businessman

=== Sports ===
- George Croughly Gordon (1850–1899), Scottish amateur international footballer
- George Gordon (Australian footballer) (1902–1990), Australian rules footballer with Fitzroy
- George Gordon (New South Wales cricketer) (1846–1923), Australian cricketer
- George Gordon (Victoria cricketer) (1860–1946), Australian cricketer

=== Writers and academics ===
- George Byron Gordon (1870–1927), American archaeologist
- George Stuart Gordon (1881–1942), British academic and professor of poetry
- George Gordon Byron, 6th Baron Byron (1788–1824), British Romantic poet more commonly known as Lord Byron

=== Others ===
- George Gordon (animator) (1906–1986), American animator and director of cartoons for TV
- George Gordon (entrepreneur) (1818-1869), British-American developer and industrialist in early San Francisco
- George Gordon (scenic artist) (c. 1839–1899), in England and Australia
- George Gordon (merchant) (circa mid-18th century), colonial American landholder
- George Stanley Gordon (1926–2013), American advertising executive

== By family ==
=== Members of the Scottish Clan Gordon ===
- George Gordon, 2nd Earl of Huntly (before 1455–1501), Chancellor of Scotland, 1498–1501
- George Gordon, 4th Earl of Huntly (1514–1562), Scottish nobleman
- George Gordon, 5th Earl of Huntly (died 1576), Lord Chancellor of Scotland
- George Gordon (bishop) (died 1588), bishop of Galloway
- George Gordon, 1st Marquess of Huntly (1562–1636), Scottish nobleman
- George Gordon, 2nd Marquess of Huntly (1592–1649)
- George Gordon, 15th Earl of Sutherland (1633–1703), Scottish nobleman
- George Gordon, 1st Earl of Aberdeen (1637–1720), Lord Chancellor of Scotland
- George Gordon, 1st Duke of Gordon (1643–1716), Scottish peer
- George Gordon, 3rd Earl of Aberdeen (1722–1801), Scottish peer
- George Gordon of Gight (1741–1779), maternal grandfather of poet George Gordon Byron
- Lord George Gordon (1751–1793), politician, leader of Gordon riots
- George Gordon, 9th Marquess of Huntly (1761–1853), Scottish peer
- George Gordon, Lord Haddo (1764–1791)
- George Gordon, 5th Duke of Gordon (1770–1836), Scottish nobleman, soldier and politician
- George Hamilton-Gordon, 4th Earl of Aberdeen (1784–1860), Prime Minister of the United Kingdom
- George Hamilton-Gordon, 5th Earl of Aberdeen (1816–1864), British peer and Liberal Party politician
- George Hamilton-Gordon, 6th Earl of Aberdeen (1841–1870), Scottish peer and sailor
- George Hamilton-Gordon, 2nd Baron Stanmore (1871–1957), British Liberal politician
- George Gordon, 2nd Marquess of Aberdeen and Temair (1879–1965), 8th Earl of Aberdeen
- George Ian Alastair Gordon, 8th Marquess of Aberdeen and Temair (born 1983)

== See also ==
- George Hamilton-Gordon (disambiguation)
