= Alfred Thornton =

English footballer (1853–1906)

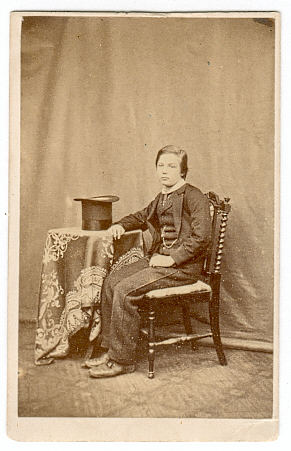
Alfred Thornton at Harrow School

Alfred Horace Thornton (27 January 1853 – 31 March 1906) was an English amateur footballer who played for England in the first representative international match against Scotland in 1870. By profession, he was a banker.

== Family and education ==
Thornton was born in Rawalpindi, Pakistan, the son of Edward Parry Thornton C.B. and Louisa Chicheliana Plowden. Edward Thornton was the grandson of Samuel Thornton, former Governor of the Bank of England and was Commissioner of Rawalpindi from 1849 to 1858 under Lord Lawrence, and Judicial Commissioner for the Punjab from 1858 to 1862. He was awarded the C.B. in 1860 in recognition of his services.

Between 1867 and 1869, Alfred attended Harrow School. In his final year at Harrow, he was a member of the school football team.

Two elder brothers, Richard Chicheley Thornton and Robert Milnes Thornton, attended Harrow from 1861 to 1864 and 1867 respectively; Richard joined the 77th (Middlesex) Regiment in 1867, attaining the rank of Lieut.-Colonel, while Robert joined the 5th Fusiliers in 1867. A younger brother, George Walter Thornton, also attended Harrow (from 1869 to 1871); he died at Avranches in Normandy on 2 May 1873.

== Football career ==
Thornton was a member of the Wanderers club, to whom he was probably introduced by E. E. Bowen, a master at Harrow School.

In March 1870, along with Bowen, he was invited to play for the English XI in a match arranged by C. W. Alcock against a side representing Scotland. This was the first of a series of matches played over the next two years, before the first official football international in November 1872. There was no score in the match until 75 minutes had elapsed, when the English goalkeeper moved out of goal to play upfield; the Scots took advantage of the exposed goal when Robert Crawford scored with a shot from distance:

. . . the game progressed until within a quarter of an hour of the time determined for the cessation of play, when the English rashly removing their goalkeeper paid the penalty by witnessing the reduction of their fortress to a long shot by R.E. Crawford.

England fought back to score through Alfred Baker to salvage a draw a minute from the end of the game.

As well as being a member of the Wanderers, Thornton played for the Harrow Chequers. On 14 October 1871, he played for Harrow Chequers against the Wanderers; the teams played out a 0–0 draw. The Morning Post mentioned Thornton as "conspicuous for excellent play". Three days later, Thornton played for the Wanderers in a 1–0 victory over the Civil Service.

== Professional career ==
On leaving school, Thornton became a banker progressing to manager of the Old Bank and Brewery at Windsor. The bank and brewery were owned by Nevile, Reid & Co. and was founded as Ramsbottom & Baverstock in 1780. In 1914, the bank was acquired by Barclays Bank. The brewery was acquired by Noakes & Co. of Bermondsey, London in 1918, eventually becoming part of the Courage Brewery.

In the 1881 census, he was shown as living at 51 Thames Street, Clewer, Berkshire; his occupation was "banker".

Thornton was also a J.P. for the County of Berkshire. He died on 31 March 1906, aged 53.
