= Baillie-Hamilton =

Baillie-Hamilton is a surname. Notable people with the surname include:

- Charles Baillie-Hamilton (Bath MP) (1900–1939), British Conservative politician
- Charles Baillie-Hamilton (priest) (1764–1820), English Anglican priest
- Charles R. Baillie-Hamilton (1848–1927), Scottish civil servant, who became clerk to the Treasury
- Ker Baillie-Hamilton (1804–1889), colonial governor born in Cleveland, England
- Robert Baillie-Hamilton (1828–1891), British politician
- William A. Baillie-Hamilton C.B., K.C.M.G. (1844–1920), Scottish civil servant
- William Baillie-Hamilton (1803–1881), British naval commander
- George Baillie-Hamilton, Lord Binning CB, MVO (1856–1917), British Army officer
- Douglas Mackinnon Baillie Hamilton Cochrane, 12th Earl of Dundonald, KCB KCVO (1852–1935), Scottish representative peer, British Army general
- George Baillie-Hamilton, 10th Earl of Haddington DL (1802–1870), Scottish Conservative politician
- George Baillie-Hamilton, 12th Earl of Haddington MC, TD (1894–1986), Scottish Peer from 1917 to 1986
- George Baillie-Hamilton-Arden, 11th Earl of Haddington KT DL (1827–1917), son of George Baillie-Hamilton, 10th Earl of Haddington
- Charles Baillie-Hamilton (Aylesbury MP) (1800–1865), British Conservative Party politician

== See also ==
- Baillie-Hamilton Island, one of the Canadian arctic islands in Nunavut, Canada
- Hamilton-Baillie
