= Giulio Cowley Smith =

English footballer

Giulio Cowley Tyler Smith (2 May 1849 – 22 July 1909) (also known as J. C. Smith and Giulio Tyler-Smith) was an amateur athlete who played for England in the first unofficial football match against Scotland in March 1870.

== Early life and education ==
Tyler Smith was born in Piccadilly, London, on 2 May 1849, the son of Dr William Tyler Smith (1815–1873) who was an eminent obstetrician and his wife, Tryphena Yearsley.

Tyler Smith attended Westminster School between 1863 and 1868 and represented the school at football in 1866–67 and 1867–68. He also won the school 100 yards and mile races. At Westminster, he was enrolled as "Julio" and is listed in the school match reports as "J.C. Smith".

== Football career ==
He played football for Middlesex in 1867, while still at school. After leaving school, he played for Old Westminsters, Crusaders, the Flying Dutchmen and the N.N. Club.

In March 1870, Tyler Smith was selected to represent England in the first pseudo-international against Scotland organised by C. W. Alcock and Arthur F. Kinnaird. The first "international" was played at Kennington Oval on 5 March 1870, and ended in a 1–1 draw.

== Later life ==
After leaving school, Tyler Smith became a tea and coffee merchant with Cassell & Co., who later became better known as publishers, based in Fenchurch Street, London. Tyler Smith served in the Middlesex Rifle Volunteer Corps between 1868 and 1872.

He married Florence Gadesden in 1878; the couple had no children. Late in life, he change his surname to "Tyler-Smith". He died on 22 July 1909 at Seaford in East Sussex.
