= John Cockerell =

English footballer

John Cockerell (22 November 1845 – 27 January 1937) was an English amateur athlete who played for England in two of the unofficial football matches against Scotland in 1870 and 1871.

== Family background ==
Cockerell was born at Camberwell in south London, the only son and third child of John Brand Cockerell and his wife Ellen née Field. His uncle, George Joseph Cockerell, was a highly successful coal merchant who supplied coal to HM Queen Victoria. The family firm was appointed as coal merchants to HM King Edward VII in 1901.

== Sporting career ==
Cockerell was an all-round athlete, who ran for the Brixton Athletics Club and the South Norwood AC. in June 1868, at the Blackheath Sports, he defeated W. G. Grace in a quarter mile race. He also played cricket for Crystal Palace and was a keen rower.

His football career started with Crystal Palace in 1865. In 1867, he represented Surrey & Kent and in 1868–1869, he represented Surrey three times. In 1868, he joined the Brixton Club, becoming club captain, and later joined the Barnes Club.

In November 1870, C. W. Alcock was organizing the second "international" match between an England XI and a Scotland XI. Alcock convened a committee of club captains to advise on the selection of players, with Cockerell representing Brixton. Cockerell nominated himself for the match, played at the Kennington Oval on 19 November 1870. The match ended in a 1–0 victory to the English, with the solitary goal coming from R.S.F. Walker. In the match report in the Sporting Gazette, Cockerell was described as "indefatigable" in "trying successfully to send the ball through the Scotch lines" and adds that "Mr Cockerell made some good runs".

Cockerell retained his place for the next match on 25 February 1871, in which he alternated in goal with Morton Betts, otherwise playing as a forward. The match ended in a 1–1 draw, with goals from Charles Nepean and R.S.F. Walker.

== Later career and family ==
Cockerell married Jessie Green in 1872; the couple had six children, two girls and four boys.

Cockerell worked as a clerk in his uncle's coal business until 1882, when he endeavoured to set up on his own account. The venture was not a success and ended in his bankruptcy, following which he rejoined the family business. At the time of the 1911 census, he was living at 240 High Rd, Tottenham and gave his occupation as "book dealer".

He died at Surbiton on 27 January 1937.

== Bibliography ==
- Mitchell, Andy (2012). First Elevens: The Birth of International Football. Andy Mitchell Media. ISBN 978-1475206845.
