= Elizabeth Mitchell (fencer) =

New Zealand fencer (1918–1998)

Personal information
- Born: Elizabeth Oakes Freeth; 13 April 1918 Sydney, New South Wales, Australia
- Died: 5 April 1998 (aged 79) Bali, Indonesia
- Relatives: Robert Freeth (father); Evelyn Freeth (grandfather); Gordon Freeth (brother)

Sport
- Country: New Zealand
- Sport: Fencing

Achievements and titles
- National finals: Foil champion (1955, 1957, 1958)

Elizabeth Oakes Mitchell (née Freeth, 13 April 1918 – 5 April 1998) was a New Zealand fencer who competed at the 1958 British Empire and Commonwealth Games.

== Early life and family ==
Born Elizabeth Oakes Freeth at the King's School, Parramatta, New South Wales, on 13 April 1918, Mitchell was the daughter of Robert Freeth, an Anglican priest and educator, and Gladys Mary Freeth (née Snashall). Her paternal grandfather was Sir Evelyn Freeth and her older brother was Sir Gordon Freeth.

Elizabeth Freeth was educated at Perth College in Mount Lawley, Western Australia, where she was swimming champion in 1934. She went on to gain a diploma from the Australasian College of Physical Education in Sydney, and worked as a physical education teacher at the Church of England Girls' School in Perth for three years, and then the Presbyterian Girls' College, Glen Osmond, South Australia, from 1938 to 1940. As well as swimming, she excelled in athletics, basketball, hockey, lifesaving and tennis, and was proficient in fencing and archery.

On 21 December 1940, she married Frank Wyndham Mitchell at the Chapel of St Mary and St George, Guildford Grammar School, Perth, where her father was headmaster at the time. The couple initially lived in Adelaide, South Australia, where Frank Mitchell was a lecturer at the Adelaide Teachers' College, and moved to Dunedin, New Zealand, in 1946 when he was appointed professor of education at the University of Otago.

== Fencing ==
Mitchell won three New Zealand national women's foil titles: in 1955, 1957, and 1958. At the 1958 British Empire and Commonwealth Games in Cardiff, she represented New Zealand in the individual women's foil. After recording five wins in the elimination pool, she progressed to the final pool where she had two wins and five losses to finish in seventh place overall.

== Death ==
Mitchell died in Bali, Indonesia, on 5 April 1998.
