= Charles W. Stephenson =

English amateur sportsman and surveyor

Charles William Stephenson (27 February 1853 – 22 April 1924) was an English amateur sportsman who made three appearances for England in the representative matches against Scotland in 1871 and 1872. He also was a member of the Football Association committee that agreed to the foundation of the first national knockout football competition, the FA Cup in 1871. By profession, he was a surveyor.

== Education ==
Stephenson was educated at Westminster School, where he was a member of the school cricket team, making several appearances between 1869 and 1871.

== Football career ==
Stephenson was a member of the Wanderers club, making his first appearance on 23 October 1869, aged 16. Described as "a most efficient back", he made 19 appearances for the Wanderers before "retiring" in 1873. He played in Wanderers' first two FA Cup ties in 1872 but was missing for the semi-final and final matches.

In February 1871, Stephenson was selected to represent England, as the solitary "back", in the third pseudo-international match against Scotland. The match ended in a 1–1 draw, with goals from Charles Nepean (Scotland) and R.S.F. Walker. Stephenson retained his place, now playing in goal, in the England XI for the next two matches, played on 18 November 1871 and 24 February 1872, which ended in victories for England, by scores of 2–1 and 1–0 respectively.

He was a member of the Football Association (FA) committee from 1871 to 1873. On 20 July 1871, C. W. Alcock, as secretary of the FA, convened a committee meeting at the offices of The Sportsman newspaper and proposed "that it is desirable that a Challenge Cup should be established in connection with the Association for which all clubs belonging to the Association should be invited to compete". The proposition was carried and the inaugural FA Cup tournament kicked off in November 1871.

Stephenson also played for the Barnes Club and appeared for London against Sheffield in 1871 and 1872.

== Professional career ==
Stephenson was a surveyor by profession, working from offices in Parliament Street, Westminster.

In 1885, he was listed as a subscriber in the formation of The Old Hayswood Coal and Iron Co. Limited.

In December 1906, he was shown in the London Gazette as a Land Tax commissioner; also listed was Lord Kinnaird who had organised the Scottish team in the international matches played in 1870 and 1871.
