= Crusaders F.C. (1859) =

Crusaders
- Full name: Crusaders Football Club
- Founded: 1859
- Dissolved: 1870
- Ground: no permanent home ground
Home colours

Crusaders Football Club was an English association football club based in London. It was a founder member of the Football Association.

== History ==
=== Before the Football Association ===
The club was founded in 1859 as a footballing club restricted to old boys from Westminster School and Eton College. The club duly played matches before the foundation of Association rules; the earliest recorded match against an external side being against Charterhouse School in January 1863, on the Under Green at Charterhouse, which the Crusaders won 1–0. The Charterhouse side missed out on a goal because the pegs that were to tighten the "cord" - the equivalent of tape in the (later) Association game, joining the tops of the posts together - had loosened, so the cord was not taut and a shot went over the cord; the tight cord was a feature of the Charterhouse rules alone.

Its first match against a regular club was a 2–0 win against the N.N. Club on 21 February 1863, with Crusaders fielding 12 men and No Names 13 (although G. H. Pember of the latter was injured early on).

An example in the flexibility of club membership, and players not being beholden to one organization, is shown by the Crusaders drawing 0–0 with Westminster School on 7 October 1863, and, three days later, 4 of the Crusaders players, 3 of the Westminster players, 3 of the Westminster reserves, and one Westminster old boy, forming the eleven of the Elizabethan Club for a 1–1 draw at Forest School.

=== Association club ===
Later in 1863, the Crusaders was a founder member of the Football Association. However, the club became less active, with nearly all of its games being against school teams; by the middle of 1866, the club was considered defunct.

In November 1866, the club played against the Civil Service side at Battersea Park, The Field noting that "Mr Berens, with praiseworthy zeal, has collected some scattered remnants of the body". Nevertheless, the match was a mere eight-a-side, and Crusaders lost 2–0. The only other matches the club played in the rest of 1866-67 were the usual matches against Charterhouse and Westminster.

=== Flying Dutchmen ===
The club did not play at all in 1867–68. At the start of 1868, a new club, the Flying Dutchmen, started up under the captaincy of W.J. Dixon, with the same Eton and Westminster membership restrictions "as far as possible" as the Crusaders, perhaps because the Crusaders had not played in the first half of the season. The club based itself at the Middlesex County Cricket Ground in Islington.

The first match for "the Flyers" was meant to be against Westminster School in January 1868, but a Drury Lane pantomime had attracted many of the schoolboys, and the opponents were listed as "Mr H.R. Dupré's XI", albeit wearing the same pink caps as the Westminsters. The Flyers only had seven starters, but these included Charles W. Alcock and Alfred Kinnaird, plus C.M. Tebbutt of the N.N. Club, and the Flyers won 4–1.

The Dutchmen only played one match in 1868–69, a 5–0 defeat at Westminster School, with only seven players turning up to face an eleven from the school; six Old Westminsters plus Kinnaird. With the Middlesex ground being sold at the end of 1868, the Eton/Westminster old boy combination side metamorphosed back into the Crusaders.

=== Brief revival ===
The first match of the revived Crusaders was in December 1868 against the Wanderers at the Westminsters' ground at Vincent Square, and had originally been listed as Wanderers playing the Flying Dutchmen. The line-up included three of the seven players who had played in the Flyers' last match, including captain Dixon; however, the familiar problems of raising a team were still present, and the Crusaders' nine men lost 3–0 to the Wanderers' eleven. The club also played the Royal Engineers in February 1869, holding the Sappers to a 0–0 draw, although the Crusaders did not have a single attempt at goal.

As Association rules became more popular, and more clubs were founded, there was no longer any need for the sort of ad hoc club with quixotic entry requirements as the Crusaders had; players were either playing for more specific old boy clubs, or for clubs with a wider membership cast like the Wanderers or the Clapham Rovers. The 1869–70 season proved to be the club's last. It could only muster six players for the Westminster School fixture, and did not turn up at all to the Charterhouse match. Remarkably, the club beat the Wanderers at the Kennington Oval in December 1869, albeit thanks to the Wanderers lending two players to the Crusaders, who had only turned up with six players, to make the match 8 against 8.

There are two more recorded games played by the club, the last being a 2–1 win away to Merton College, Oxford, in February 1870. Additionally reports on the England v Scotland representative match in March 1870 have Smith and Kinnaird both listed as Crusaders club members.

== Colours ==
The earliest reference to the club's colours is the report of the match against Westminster in October 1863, referring to the club as "the black and red". In 1864, the Football Association recorded the club's colours as red caps.

== Notable players ==
- Edgar Lubbock, future FA Cup winner, was a Crusader in 1866 and 1869–70 (and played for the Flying Dutchmen in 1868)
- Giulio Cowley Smith, unofficial England international
- Arthur Kinnaird played for the club in 1870

== See also ==
- Gitanos F.C., another club of the time made up of old boys from two public schools (Eton and Charterhouse)
