= Alexander Morten =

Footballer (1831–1900)

Personal information
- Date of birth: 15 November 1831
- Place of birth: London, England
- Date of death: 24 February 1900 (aged 68)
- Place of death: Earls Court, England
- Height: 1.93 m (6 ft 4 in)
- Position: Goalkeeper

Senior career*
Years	Team	Apps	(Gls)
1863–1866	N.N. Club	82	(0)
1865–1874	Wanderers	385	(1)
1866–1874	Crystal Palace	617	(0)

International career
1870	Scotland XI	1	(0)
1873	England	1	(0)
- * Club domestic league appearances and goals

Alexander Morten (some sources say "Alec Morten") (15 November 1831 – 24 February 1900) was a footballer who played as a goalkeeper. He captained the England team in its second official international, played against Scotland on 8 March 1873. He had previously played for the Scotland team in 1870 at representative level, before switching to England three years later.

== Date of birth and personal life ==
Morten was born in Paddington, Middlesex on 15 November 1831. He married Flora Hedger (1833–1900) at St Peter's Church, Petersham, on 17 March 1855. They had six children, although two died in infancy. Morten was a stockbroker on the London Stock Exchange.

== Club career ==
Morten played for the N.N. Club of Kilburn from 1863 to 1866, before switching to the original Crystal Palace F.C. – who were a leading amateur side, and one that was in existence as early as 1861. His association with Crystal Palace continued for nine years.

Between 1865 and 1874, Morten also turned out for Wanderers F.C., who, despite being amateurs, were the most celebrated team of the day. He made his first appearance for Wanderers on 16 December 1865 in a 3–1 victory at Reigate and went on to make 24 appearances, with his final appearance being in a 2–0 defeat by Royal Engineers. His most prolific period was between 1869 and 1872, when he made 17 of his 24 appearances, although he was not part of the Wanderers side that won the FA Cup in 1872, losing his place to Reginald de Courtenay Welch, who generally played as full-back.

Retiring as a player towards the end of 1874, Morten was replaced in the Wanderers goal by W.D.O. Greig.

Morten also represented Middlesex and served on the Football Association council in 1874–75, and occasionally appeared as an "umpire", the forerunner to today's referees.

== International career ==
Morten was the first goalkeeper to captain the English international side and holds the twin distinctions of having been born at an earlier date than any other international footballer, and of being older than any other England player on his international debut. He was aged 41 years 113 days when he made his solitary England appearance on 8 March 1873. The oldest player to represent England was Stanley Matthews, who was aged 42 years 103 days when he played his final match on 15 May 1957.

England won Morten's solitary international by a score of 4–2, but the goalkeeper was coming to the end of his career and never played for his country again. Despite having been born in London, and having no apparent Scottish connections, Morten had earlier represented Scotland in the March 1870 international against England. According to the match report in "The Sporting Gazette" of Saturday 12 March 1870, Morten "proved a most efficient goal-keeper".

The Football Association secretary, Charles Alcock, wanted to field Morten as goalkeeper in the international match against Scotland in 1872, but injury prevented this, with the result that England played the first international with Robert Barker in goal for the first half, being replaced by William Maynard at some point in the second half.

He was rated as perhaps the best goalkeeper in the world during the early 1870s; according to the Football Annual for 1873: "Toujours prêt is his motto when between the posts, in which position he is without a rival, never losing his head, even under the most trying circumstances."

== Death ==
Alexander Morton died at 21 Hogarth Road, Earl's Court, London on 24 February 1900, aged 68, and was buried in Kensal Green Cemetery.
