= William C. Butler =

English footballer (1844–1914)

Captain William Charles Butler (17 January 1844 – 6 December 1914) played football for England against a Scottish XI in two unofficial internationals in 1870 and 1871. He subsequently became a J.P. and Registrar in Cumberland.

== Family ==
Butler was the son of Captain Charles George Butler R.N. (1793–1867) and Emily Bayford. His paternal grandfather was Sir Richard Butler, 7th Baronet of Cloughgrenan, descending from James Butler, 9th Earl of Ormond and 2nd Earl of Ossory, through his second son, Sir Edmund Butler of Cloughgrenan (1534–c.1585). This Cloughgrenan line survives to the present day through James Richard Henry Ormonde Brooke (b. 1972), William's great-great-grandson. James Richard is the son of Penelope Eve Butler (b. 1942) and Irish Guards Lt.-Col. Thomas Christopher Peter Brooke (1938–2020), 1st cousin once removed of Bernard Jocelyn Brooke, author and naturalist.

In July 1877, William Charles Butler married Emily Chadwick; they had six children – three daughters and three sons. The sons were:

- Henry Beauchamp Butler (1878–1952) who was educated at Charterhouse School and became a solicitor. He later joined the Colonial Service in Nigeria and took part in the Egba Expedition in 1918.
- Lt.-Col.Charles Walter Butler OBE (1880–1941) who was also educated at Charterhouse. He became a soldier in the Suffolk Regiment, fighting in the Boer War between 1899 and 1900, in the First World War, where he was mentioned in despatches twice, and in the Afghan War in 1919. He gained the rank of Lieutenant-Colonel in the service of the Indian Army and was invested with the O.B.E. in 1920.
- William Bayford Butler (1888–1937) who, like his brothers, was educated at Charterhouse and also fought in the First World War with the 3rd Battalion, Border Regiment. He reached the rank of Captain and was decorated with the Military Cross.

== Football career ==
Butler was a member of the Barnes and Civil Service football clubs. In March 1870, he was invited by the Wanderers' captain, C.W. Alcock to take part in a match between "England" and "Scotland". This was the first of five "pseudo-internationals" which took place before the first officially recognized international in November 1872. He was the only member of the England XI who was not a member of the Wanderers club.

His second appearance for England came in February 1871; the match report included an early reference to the Combination Game style of football:

It seemed as if the [Scottish] defence would prove more than equal to the attack, until a well-executed run-down by C.W. Alcock, W.C. Butler and R.S.F. Walker, acting in concert, enabled the last-named of the trio to equalise the score by the accomplishment of a well-merited goal for England.

== Later career ==
Butler was enlisted in the Third Battalion, The Border Regiment where in 1884 he reached the rank of Captain.

He was later a Justice of the peace (J.P.) for Cumberland and held the office of Registrar of the Probate Division of the High Court of Justice.
