= William Tyler Smith =

English obstetrician, medical writer and journalist

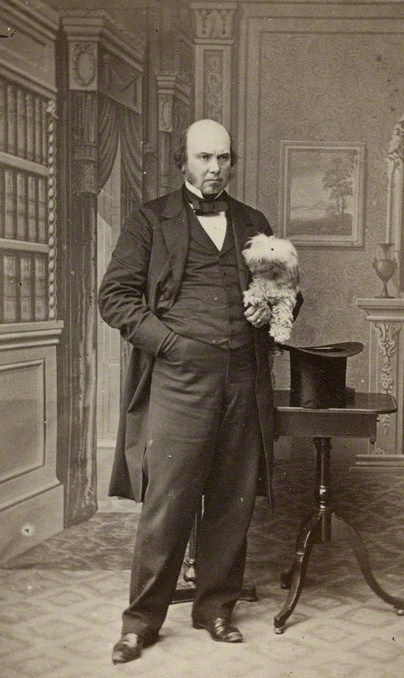
- William Tyler Smith, 1860s photograph
- Born: April 10, 1815; Near Bristol, England
- Died: May 20, 1873 (aged 58); Richmond, Surrey, England
- Resting place: East Blatchington, England
- Education: Bristol school of medicine
- Alma mater: University of London
- Occupations: Obstetrician, medical writer, journalist
- Known for: Obstetrics
- Spouse: Tryphena Yearsley
- Children: 7 (5 survived infancy)

William Tyler Smith (1815–1873) was an English obstetrician, medical writer and journalist, with outside interests in insurance and the development of Seaford, East Sussex, U.K.

== Early life ==
Smith was born into a hard working family, near Bristol on 10 April 1815. He was educated at the Bristol school of medicine, where he became prosector and post-mortem clerk. He graduated as bachelor of medicine at the University of London in 1840, and eight years later proceeded M.D. He became a licentiate of the College of Physicians, London, in 1850, and was elected to the fellowship in 1859.

== Medical career ==
Smith began his career as a teacher in the private school of George Dermott in Bedford Square, and became an effective lecturer despite lacking natural gifts. When St. Mary's Hospital was founded, he was appointed obstetric physician and lecturer on obstetrics. He continued his teaching there for the allotted term of twenty years, and on retirement was elected consulting physician accoucheur. He held the post of examiner in obstetrics at the University of London for five years.

At first living at 7 Bolton Street, Piccadilly, Smith moved to 7 Upper Grosvenor Street, and then to No. 21 in the same street. For several years he was largely dependent on writing, building up a professional reputation. He became a member of the editorial staff of The Lancet. promoted speciality of obstetric medicine also as a participant in the foundation and administration, of the Obstetrical Society of London, of which he was the second President, elected 1860.

== Interests ==
Smith was associated with Thomas Wakley in the establishment of the New Equitable Life Assurance Society. One of its aims was fair reward for the professional services of medical men, and he became one of the first directors. When the society was merged the Briton Life Office, he became deputy chairman of the united companies.

Another project of Smith was to develop Seaford, East Sussex as a sanatorium and fashionable watering-place. He purchased of land in and adjoining the town, and leased more from the corporation, on the condition that he should secure it against the frequent flooding by the sea, and build on it. He was active in promoting the foundation and success of the convalescent hospital at Seaford, and was bailiff of the town (in 1861, 1864, 1867, 1868, and 1870). He was magistrate for the town and port from 1861 for the rest of his life.

== Death ==
Smith died at Richmond, Surrey on Whit-Monday 1873, and was buried at East Blatchington.

== Works ==
Smith wrote:

- Scrofula: its Nature, Causes, and Treatment. London, 1844.
- The Periodoscope, with its application to Obstetric Calculations in the Periodicities of the Sex. London, 1848.
- Parturition and the Principles and Practice of Obstetrics. London, 1849.
- The New Uterine Operation: On a New Method of Treatment of Sterility by Removal of Obstructions of the Fallopian Tubes. London, 1849.
- The Pathology and Treatment of Leucorrhœa. London, 1855.
- A Manual of Obstetrics, theoretical and practical. London, 1858.

He contributed to the Medico-Chirurgical Transactions, Obstetrical Transactions, and Pathological Transactions. also papers On Quacks and Quackery, and a series of biographical sketches of London physicians and surgeons. Marshall Hall, a close friend, suggested that he study applications of the reflex function in obstetrics, and Smith wrote on the topic in The Lancet. The articles led Parturition, and the Principles and Practice of Obstetrics (1849), dedicated to Hall. Other lectures published in The Lancet formed the basis of his Manual of Obstetrics, 1858. In his time, these books by Smith, especially the Manual, became standard texts, alongside the works of Thomas Denman the elder, despite his relative lack of practical experience.

== Family ==
Smith married Tryphena, daughter of Moses Yearsley, of Southwick Park, near Tewkesbury, and had seven children, two of whom died in infancy. Their son Giulio played for England against Scotland in the first (unofficial) international football match on 5 March 1870.
