= Eleanor Southey Baker McLaglan =

New Zealand doctor

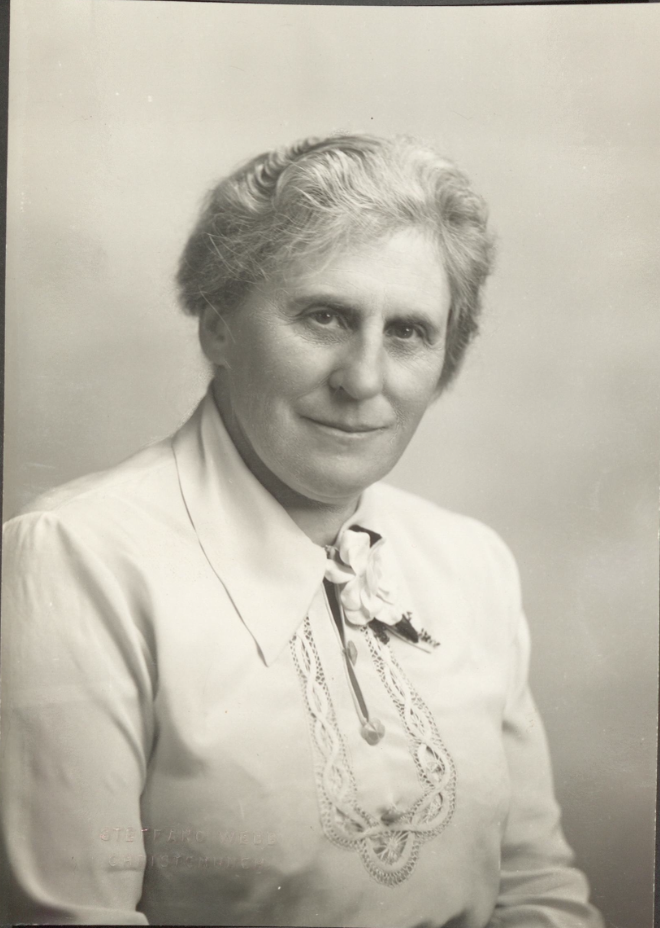
Dr Eleanor Baker McLaglan by Steffano Webb, Christchurch, 1940.

Eleanor Southey Baker McLaglan (13 September 1879 – 20 September 1969) was a New Zealand medical doctor, who worked in school medicine from 1914 to 1940.

== Early life ==
McLaglan was born in French Farm, at Akaroa near Christchurch, New Zealand on 13 September 1879. Her parents were Thomas Southey Baker (1848–1902), an English schoolteacher who played for England in the unofficial football international match against Scotland on 18 November 1871, and his wife Josephine Dicken. She attended Otago Girls' High School and medical school at the University of Otago, graduating in 1903. She was the sixth woman in New Zealand to qualify in medicine.

== Career ==
After qualifying McLaglan spent a short period in Dublin gaining a licentiate in midwifery before returning to New Zealand in 1904. She took up a number of temporary positions including as an assistant medical officer at Seacliff Mental Hospital under Sir Truby King, and positions at Ashburn Hall and in general practice in Auckland. In 1905 she began a three year post as sole medical officer in general practice at Te Kōpuru, near Dargaville, Northland where she was well-liked. In 1914 she was appointed, by the Department of Education, to the School Medical Service in the Canterbury–Westland area. Her area included 350 schools with 36,000 children on the rolls. She found school medicine rewarding, seeing how a child's life could be improved once dental, eyesight and deafness problems were addressed.

In 1920 McLaglan (then known as Eleanor Baker) and Charles Hercus began an investigation into the incidence of goitre in school children in Canterbury and Westland; they found a very high incidence of the condition and identified a serious public health problem. Seven years later, in a report to the Canterbury Education Board, McLaglan warned that the dangers of goitre in school children still persisted. An inquiry into the incidence of tuberculosis in school children was carried out in 1927 by McLaglan and Dr Mary Champtaloup. She retired from school medicine in 1940.

Several times in her career McLaglan felt she had suffered from prejudice against female doctors, particularly from male colleagues. During World War II she worked in hospitals in Timaru, Wanganui and Wellington, as a house surgeon and registrar and finally found that she was respected by younger male doctors. Her final position was as medical officer at Silverstream Hospital, retiring to Auckland at age 73.

== Private life ==
McLaglan married Captain Sydney Leopold Temple McLaglan in England in 1923. They returned to New Zealand in 1924. It appears the marriage was short-lived. Sydney's brother was the film actor Victor McLaglen.

McLaglan published her autobiography Stethoscope and Saddlebags in 1965. She died in Auckland on 20 September 1969, aged 90.

== Publications ==
- C.E. Hercus and E.S. Baker, Further consideration of endemic goitre, Part I New Zealand Medical Journal 22 (1923): 88.
- C.E. Hercus and E.S. Baker, Further consideration of endemic goitre, Part II New Zealand Medical Journal 22 (1923): 169.
