= Thomas Kirkpatrick =

Thomas Kirkpatrick may refer to:

- Thomas Kirkpatrick (Canadian politician) (1805–1870), Canadian lawyer and politician
- Thomas Kirkpatrick (New York politician), American politician from New York
- Thomas J. Kirkpatrick (1829–1897), Virginia lawyer, Confederate officer and politician
- Percy Kirkpatrick (Thomas Percy Claude Kirkpatrick, 1869–1954), Irish physician, historian and writer
- Sir Thomas Kirkpatrick, 1st Baronet (died c. 1695) of the Kirkpatrick baronets
- Sir Thomas Kirkpatrick, 2nd Baronet (died c. 1730) of the Kirkpatrick baronets
- Sir Thomas Kirkpatrick, 3rd Baronet (1704–1771) of the Kirkpatrick baronets
- Sir Thomas Kirkpatrick, 5th Baronet (1777–1844) of the Kirkpatrick baronets
- Sir Thomas Kirkpatrick, 7th Baronet (1839–1880) of the Kirkpatrick baronets

== See also ==
- Kirkpatrick (disambiguation)
- Clan Kirkpatrick
