= William A. Baillie-Hamilton =

Scottish civil servant (1844–1920)

Sir William Alexander Baillie-Hamilton KCMG CB (6 September 1844 – 6 July 1920) was a Scottish civil servant, who became Private Secretary to the Chief Secretary for Ireland and to the Secretary of State for the Colonies between 1886 and 1892. In his youth, he was a keen sportsman who played for the Scottish side in the first football match against England in March 1870.

== Family and education ==
Baillie-Hamilton was born at Brighton, the son of Admiral William Alexander Baillie-Hamilton and Lady Harriet Hamilton. His father was Second Secretary to the Admiralty from 1845 to 1855; his mother was the daughter of James Hamilton, Viscount Hamilton M.P.

He was educated at Harrow, leaving there in 1863.

On 21 June 1871, he married Mary Aynscombe Mossop, daughter of Reverend John Mossop (rector at Hothfield, Kent). They had two sons:

- George Douglas Baillie-Hamilton (1875–1934)
- Walter Stuart Baillie-Hamilton (1880–1953)

== Sporting career ==
In 1870, Baillie-Hamilton was selected together with his younger brother Charles by fellow civil servant, James Kirkpatrick, to represent Scotland in a football match to be played against England at the Kennington Oval on 5 March 1870. The match ended in a 1–1 draw, with the Scottish goal being scored by fellow Harrovian, Robert Crawford.

Baillie-Hamilton also represented Harrow School at cricket; he later represented M.C.C. between 1877 and 1881.

== Military career ==
Baillie-Hamilton was a member of the East Lothians and Berwickshire Imperial Yeomanry, being promoted to the rank of captain in June 1878. He ultimately gained the rank of Lieutenant-Colonel and Honorary Colonel of the regiment.

== Civil Service career ==
On leaving Harrow, Baillie-Hamilton entered the Colonial Office in 1864, reaching the rank of First Class Clerk in 1879. He was secretary to the Colonial Conference in 1887; he was Private Secretary to the Chief Secretary for Ireland and to the Secretary of State for the Colonies between 1886 and 1892. He became a Principal Clerk in 1894 and Chief Clerk in 1897. He was Chief Clerk of the Colonial Office between 1896 and 1909, when he retired.

He also qualified as a barrister and was admitted to the Inner Temple in 1871.

In 1884, he published a novel, "Mr. Montenello: a romance of the civil service".

He died on 6 July 1920, aged 75.

== Honours ==
In May 1887, Baillie-Hamilton was invested as a Companion of the Order of St. Michael and St. George and in August 1892 as a Companion of the Order of the Bath (C.B.). He was promoted to Knight Commander of the Order of St. Michael and St. George (K.C.M.G.) in the 1897 Diamond Jubilee Honours; the investiture took place at Windsor Castle on 9 December 1897.

In November 1901, he was appointed an Officer of Arms of the Order of St. Michael and St. George by King Edward VII. In May 1911, the title was changed to Gentleman Usher of the Blue Rod, a position held by Baillie-Hamilton until his death.

Court offices
| Preceded by Frederick Obadiah Adrian | Gentleman Usher of the Blue Rod; 1901–1920 | Succeeded by Sir Reginald Laurence Antrobus |
