= Evan Nepean (cricketer) =

English cricketer

Evan Nepean in 1889

For the British politician and colonial administrator, see Evan Nepean.

Evan Alcock Nepean (13 September 1865 – 20 January 1906) was an English barrister and first-class cricketer. Active 1886–1902, he played for Middlesex, Marylebone Cricket Club (MCC) and Oxford University.

== Life ==
He was the son of Sir Evan Colville Nepean (1836–1908) of the War Office and his wife Elizabeth Jenner, born in Mitcham. He was educated at St Mark's School, Windsor, Berkshire, and Sherborne School. He matriculated at University College, Oxford in 1884, and played in the University cricket XI in 1887 and 1888.

Nepean was called to the bar at the Inner Temple in 1891, and subsequently played less cricket, concentrating on his legal career; but he played for the MCC against the Australians at Lords in 1893. He died in Windsor. He had suffered pneumonia after influenza. At the time he was one of the counsel in the case of the Daira Sanieh corporation of Egypt. Initially he had been junior to H. H. Asquith, who gave up the brief in 1905 on entering government.

== Cricketer ==
Nepean played 45 matches for Middlesex; his uncles Augustus Nepean and Charles Nepean were also Middlesex cricketers. His final first-class game was for the MCC in 1902. He also played for Dorset County Cricket Club.

Nepean was a noted all-rounder, and Prince Christian Victor of Schleswig-Holstein claimed to have discovered his talent at the 1887 Perambulators v. Etceteras trial match at Oxford for public school boys. He did well with bat and ball in Oxford's 1887 victory in the Varsity Match. He was considered to be at his peak in 1889. He was initially a fast bowler; later he bowled leg breaks.

== Family ==
Nepean married in 1892 Evelyn Reid, daughter of Cecil Frederick Read, a director of Reid's Brewery Co.; they had a son, Evan Cecil, born in 1893, died 4 October 1918 serving in the Royal Scots Fusiliers.
