= George Croughly Gordon =

Scottish footballer

George Croughly Gordon (21 June 1850 – 20 August 1899) was a Scottish amateur footballer who played for the Scottish XI against England in the first representative match played in March 1870. He was a member of the British civil service before settling in Australia where he worked as a telegraph construction contractor.

== Family ==
Gordon was born in Kensington, London to Cosmo Gordon and Helen Hensley. His paternal grandfather was born near Tomintoul, Banffshire.

He was married to Mary Agnes Wallace and they had two sons:

- Roy Stuart Croughly Gordon (c.1893–1960)
- John Glenny Croughly Gordon (b. 1899)

== Football career ==
Gordon was a member of the N.N. Club. On 5 March 1870, he was selected as a late replacement for Lord Kilmarnock who had been originally named in the side to face England in the first "international" football match between representatives of the two countries. The match had been postponed by two weeks because the Oval pitch was frozen; by the time of the rescheduled match, Kilmarnock was required on military duty.

The match ended in a 1–1 draw with the goals coming from Robert Crawford for Scotland and a late equalizer from Alfred Baker.

== Business career ==
Gordon was a member of the Civil Service at the time of his appearance for "Scotland".

In 1881, he was in Auckland, New Zealand where he was described as a "merchant" when he subscribed for shares in various mining companies.

He later emigrated to Australia where, by 1884, he was in partnership with Matthew Moreton and others trading as "Gordon & Moreton", telegraph construction contractors. The firm was contracted to build the second section of the telegraph from Fairview, near Cooktown, Queensland to Cape York, for a distance of 168 miles, with work lasting from July 1884 to October 1886.

He died at the mining town of Cue, Western Australia on 20 August 1899.
