= Alexander Nash =

England footballer (1849–1906)

Alexander Andrew Ellis Nash (30 August 1849 – 18 July 1906) was an English amateur footballer who played for England in the first representative match against Scotland in March 1870.

== Family and education ==
Nash was born in Edmonton in North London, the only son of William Nash (1813–1868) and his wife Caroline née Fairbank (1822–1857). He was baptised at All Saints, Edmonton on 13 October 1849. In the 1851 census, William Nash was described as a "glass merchant".

Nash was educated at Brentwood Grammar School between 1862 and 1867, where he represented the school at both football and cricket. At Brentwood, his colleagues included R. S. F. Walker, who played in three of the early "international" matches, scoring four goals.

Nash's nephew, Lieut Arthur William Swanston, the son of his sister Fanny Elizabeth, was killed near Chrissiesmeer in the eastern Transvaal in the Anglo-Boer War on 16 October 1900, while trying to save the life of a fellow soldier. For 65 years after his death, his Scottish fiancée arranged for flowers to be placed on his grave.

== Football career ==
Nash played for the Wanderers club in the 1869–70 season, making six appearances as a forward, scoring twice. His cousin, Andrew John Nash (A. J. Nash) also played for Wanderers at the same time, making nine appearances. In late 1869, he joined Clapham Rovers, becoming the club captain. In April 1870, he won the shot put at the club sports competition.

In March 1870, Nash was selected to represent England in the first pseudo-international against Scotland organised by C. W. Alcock and Arthur F. Kinnaird. The first "international" was played at Kennington Oval on 5 March 1870, and ended in a 1–1 draw. Nash was one of only two players not from a public school background (the other being Alfred Baker) selected to represent England.

Nash played for Clapham Rovers alongside his cousin, A. J. Nash, in the inaugural FA Cup tournament in 1871 and remained with the club for several years, representing them on the Football Association committee from 1872 to 1874, and acting as an umpire as late as 1876.

== Later life ==
Nash later became a merchant in London, joining the Merchant Taylors' Company in 1870.

He married Harriette Jane Routledge (1850–1906) at St Matthias Church, Richmond on 24 September 1896. The couple had no children.

Nash died aged 56 on 18 July 1906 at Gilfach while on holiday in South Wales. A coroner's inquest concluded that the cause of death was chloral hydrate poisoning, although no charges were brought against anyone. At the time of his death, he was the beneficiary of a trust fund, valued at £20,000.

== Bibliography ==
- Cavallini, Rob (2005). The Wanderers F.C. – "Five times F.A. Cup winners". Dog N Duck Publications. ISBN 0-9550496-0-1.
- Mitchell, Andy (2011). Arthur Kinnaird: First Lord of Football. Andy Mitchell. ISBN 978-1-4636-2111-7.
- Mitchell, Andy (2012). First Elevens: The Birth of International Football. Andy Mitchell Media. ISBN 978-1475206845.
