= Charles R. Baillie-Hamilton =

Scottish footballer and civil servant

Charles Robert Baillie-Hamilton (24 September 1848 – 28 July 1927) was a Scottish civil servant, who became clerk to the Treasury. In his youth, he was a keen sportsman who played for the Scottish side in the first football match against England in March 1870.

== Family ==
Baillie-Hamilton was born in Greenwich, Kent, the son of Admiral William Alexander Baillie-Hamilton (1803–1881) and Lady Harriet Hamilton (1812–1884). His father was Second Secretary to the Admiralty from 1845 to 1855; his mother was the daughter of James Hamilton, Viscount Hamilton M.P. (1786–1814).

Baillie-Hamilton was educated at Repton School from 1862 to 1864. He never married.

== Sporting career ==
In 1870, he was selected together with his elder brother William by fellow civil servant, James Kirkpatrick, to represent Scotland in a football match against England to be played at the Kennington Oval on 5 March 1870. The match ended in a 1–1 draw, with the Scottish goal being scored by Robert Crawford.

== Civil Service career ==
For his international football appearance, he was listed as a member of the Civil Service club.

He was employed as a clerk to the Treasury from 1868 to 1889, after which he became an artist living at Preston, near Lavenham in Suffolk.

He died in Taplow, Buckinghamshire on 28 July 1927, aged 78.

== Bibliography ==
- Mitchell, Andy (2012). First Elevens: The Birth of International Football. Andy Mitchell Media. ISBN 978-1475206845.
