= Edward Parry Thornton =

British colonial administrator in India (1811–1893)

- Born: 7 October 1811
- Died: 10 December 1893 (aged 82); Warwick Square, London
- Education: Charterhouse School
- Occupation: Administrator in India
- Spouse: Louisa Chicheliana (m. 1841)
- Mother: Elizabeth Thornton
- Relatives: Alfred Thornton (son); Samuel Thornton (grandfather)

Edward Parry Thornton (7 October 1811 – 10 December 1893) was a British administrator in India.

== Biography ==
Thornton was born on 7 October 1811. He was the second son of John Thornton of Clapham by his wife Eliza, daughter of Edward Parry. Samuel Thornton was his grandfather. Edward was educated at Haileybury and Charterhouse, and obtained a writership in the Bengal civil service on 30 April 1830. On 2 August 1831 he was appointed assistant under the commissioner of revenue in the Goruckpore division, and on 6 October 1836 he became assistant to the magistrate and collector at Goruckpore. He returned to England on furlough early in 1842, and on proceeding again to India in 1845 was appointed joint magistrate and deputy collector at Muttra, and later in the same year chief magistrate and collector. In 1848 he was transferred in the same capacity to Serampore. In 1849, when Dalhousie was choosing the ablest Indian officials for the task of organising the Punjaub, Thornton was appointed a commissioner and placed at Rawul Pindi in the Jhelum division. In 1852 he distinguished himself by his promptitude and courage in arresting Nadir Khan, a discontented son of the raja of Mandla, who was endeavouring to promote a rising of the hill tribes. He received a bullet wound in the throat while executing his perilous mission, but had the satisfaction of preventing the rising. In May 1857, at the time of the mutiny, Lord Lawrence made Rawul Pindi his headquarters. Thornton was constantly with him, ably seconding his measures, and he afterwards gave interesting details of Lawrence's conduct at that anxious time, which have been preserved in Bosworth Smith's ‘Life of Lord Lawrence.’ After Lawrence had denuded the Punjaub of troops to assist in the operations against Delhi, Thornton was called on to exercise more independent authority. In the beginning of September 1857 the intelligence reached Lady Lawrence at Murri that the tribes in the lower Hazarah country contemplated revolt. She communicated the intelligence to Thornton, who succeeded in arresting the leaders of the conspiracy within a few hours, and by this prompt action prevented any attempt at rebellion. On the conclusion of the mutiny Thornton was appointed judicial commissioner for the Punjaub, and on 18 May 1860 he was made a companion of the Bath in recognition of his services. He retired from the Indian service in 1862.

He wrote ‘Illustrations of the History and Practices of the Thugs’ (1837, London, 8vo), ll. Thornton also contributed to the eighth edition of the ‘Encyclopædia Britannica’ the articles on Bombay, Bengal, Ganges, Nepaul, and, in conjunction with David Buchanan, those on Afghanistan and Burmah.

Thornton died in London at Warwick Square on 10 December 1893. In 1840 he married Louisa Chicheliana, the daughter of R. Chichely Plowden, by whom he had four sons and two daughters. One of his sons, Alfred Thornton, was a footballer.

Several works, commonly attributed to Thornton, are by others of the same name. A Captain Thornton, R.N., was author of 'A Summary of the History of the East India Company' (London, 1833, 8vo). Edward Thornton (1799–1875), probably a cousin of Edward Parry Thornton, who was in the East India House from 1814 to 1857, and was head of the maritime department from 1847, wrote : 1. 'India: its State and Prospects,' London, 1835, 8vo; 2. 'Chapters of the Modern History of British India,' London, 1840, 8vo; 3. 'History of the British Empire in India,' London, 1841–5, 6 vols. 8vo (second edition, 1 vol., 1858); 4. 'Gazetteer of the Countries adjacent to India on the North-West,' London, 1844, 2 vols. 8vo; 5. 'Gazetteer of the Territories under the Government of the East India Company,' London, 1854, 4 vols. 8vo (other editions followed, the last, revised by Sir Roper Lethbridge and Arthur Naylor Wollaston, appearing in 1886).
