= Galfred Congreve =

Scottish sportsperson (1849–1882)

Galfred Francis Congreve (also Galfrid; 16 July 1849 – 10 February 1882) was an amateur sportsman who played for Scotland in the second representative football match against England in 1870.

== Early life ==
Congreve was born in Crossmichael, Kirkcudbrightshire, Scotland. to Richard Jones Congreve (1806–1879) and Louisa Margaret Miller (d.1880), daughter of Lieutenant-Colonel William Miller C.B, K.H., who was appointed one of the Deputy Inspectors General of the Constabulary in Ireland in 1836. William Miller's wife, Frances, was the daughter of Sir Charles, 5th Baronet Levinge, of High Park, co. Westmeath.

== Sporting career ==
Galfred was a keen cricketer and played regularly for the M.C.C. between 1872 and 1876 in minor matches. He also played for the Civil Service, Sleaford and the Surrey Club.

In the second pseudo international football match, Congreve played for the Scotland XI; the match ended in a 1–0 victory for the English, with the goal coming from R.S.F. Walker.

== Professional career ==
Congreve was listed in the 1881 census as lodging in Stormont Road, Battersea. He was described as a civil servant, working in the Exchequer & Audit Office Examining Branch.

== Rugby School ==
Congreve was listed as playing for the "Old Rugbeians" at the time of his appearance for Scotland. There is no sign of him, however, in the "Rugby School Register" for the period from August 1842 to January 1874. The register does list Richard Congreve as a master at the school between 1845 and 1848; but of no relation.

== Death ==
Congreve died in Clapham, Surrey in 1882.
