= Evelyn Freeth =

English civil servant and footballer (1846–1911)

Sir Evelyn Freeth
- Born: May 25, 1846; London W1, England
- Died: September 16, 1911 (aged 65); New Milton, Hampshire, England
- Citizenship: British
- Education: Eton College
- Occupations: Civil servant; Tax expert
- Years active: 1864–1908
- Known for: Expertise on death duties; Played in the first international football match (1870)
- Title: Knight Bachelor (1908)
- Spouse: Florence Thompson Oakes 1870 ()
- Children: 8, including Robert Freeth

Sir Evelyn Freeth (25 May 1846 – 16 September 1911) was an English civil servant who became an expert on death duties. In his youth he was a keen sportsman who played football against Scotland in the first representative match in March 1870.

== Family and education ==
Freeth was born at Welbeck Street, London W1, the son of Charles Freeth (1816–1884) and Anna Elizabeth Turner (1819–1878). His father was a manager for Sun Fire Insurance.

He was educated at Eton College from where he joined the Civil Service in 1864.

He married Florence Thompson Oakes at St. Andrew's, Haverstock Hill, Middlesex on 10 May 1870. They had eight children, including Robert (1886–1979), who became headmaster of Guildford Grammar School, Perth, Western Australia in 1928 and archdeacon and assistant bishop at St. George's Cathedral, Perth in the 1950s. Robert's son, Gordon (1914–2001), won a gold medal for Australia in the Men's Coxed fours (rowing) at the 1938 British Empire Games.

== Sporting career ==
Freeth was a member of the Civil Service Football Club. In March 1870, he was selected to represent England in the first pseudo-international against Scotland organised by C. W. Alcock and Arthur F. Kinnaird; he had previously represented London in a match against Edinburgh. The first "international" was played at Kennington Oval on 5 March 1870, with Freeth playing as a "back"; the match ended in a 1–1 draw. The match report in The Sporting Gazette of Saturday 12 March 1870 said "For England...Messrs E. Freeth and E. Lubbock were also very effective as backs", while the Glasgow Herald said "among the English, A. Baker, E. Lubbock and E. Freeth were the most prominent".

Freeth was also a member of the Wanderers club.

== Civil service career ==
In 1864, Freeth entered the Legacy and Succession Duty Office at Somerset House. He became Deputy Controller, Legacy & Succession Duties, Ireland in 1884, Registrar of Estate Duties, Ireland in 1900 and Registrar of the Estate Duty Office at Somerset House from September 1902 to 1908.

Shortly before his retirement in 1908, he was honoured with a knighthood by King Edward VII. Following his retirement, he moved to New Milton in Hampshire where he died in 1911.

=== Publications ===
Freeth's published writings include:

- "A Guide to the New Death Duty with an introduction and Forms" (1894, as Deputy Controller of Legacy and Succession Duties)
- Joint editor of Trevor's Taxes on Succession
- A Digest of Death-Duty Cases Compiled for Official Use (1897, co-author with W. Pitt-Bremner)
- Death Duty Acts (2nd ed., 1897)
- Freeth's Death Duties (4th ed., 1908)
