= William Baillie-Hamilton =

Scottish Royal Navy Admiral (1803–1881)

Admiral William Baillie-Hamilton
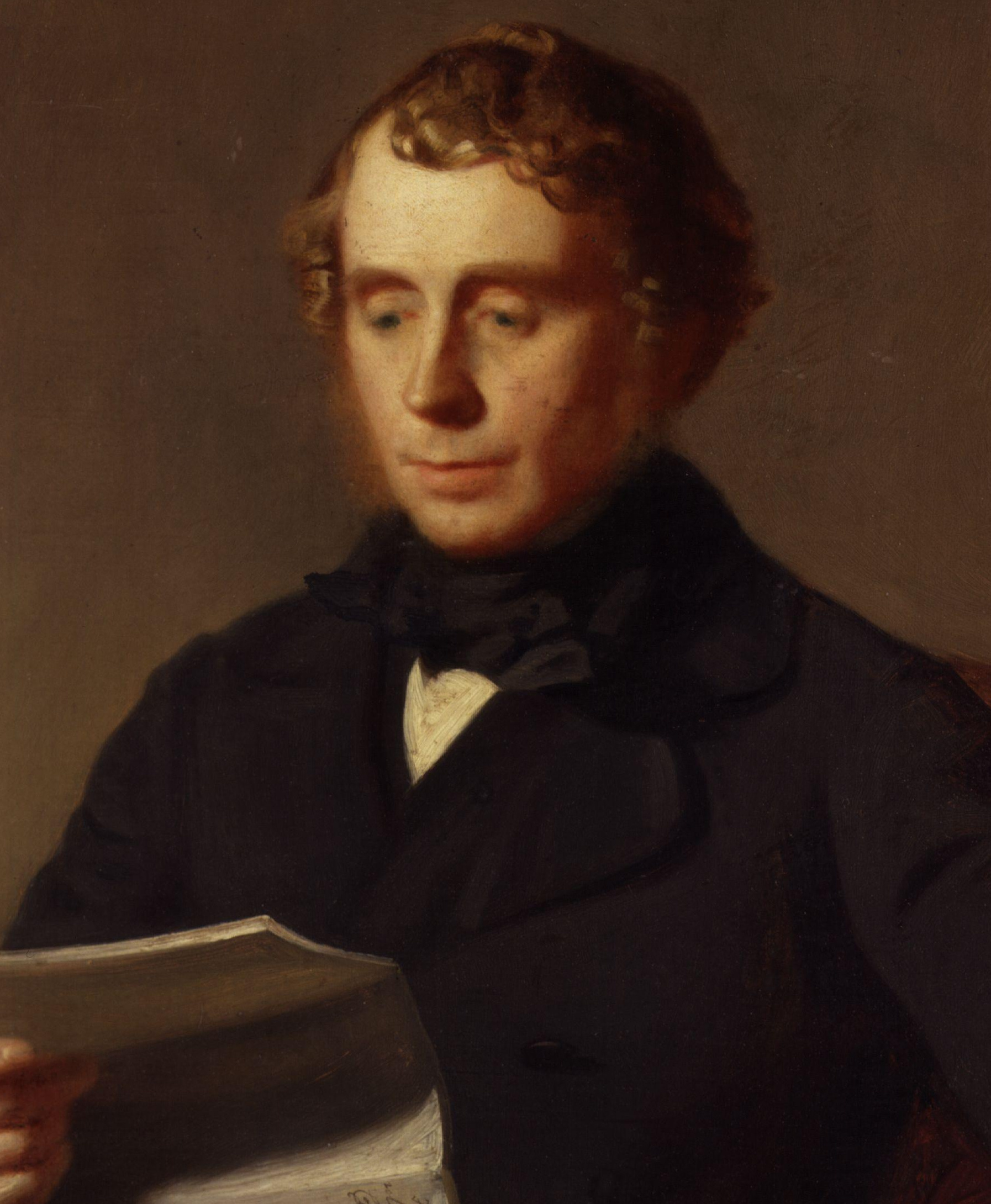
- Baillie-Hamilton around 1850

Second Secretary to the Admiralty
- In office 28 April 1845 – 22 May 1855
- Preceded by: Sir John Barrow
- Succeeded by: Thomas Phinn

Personal details
- Born: William Alexander Baillie-Hamilton; 6 June 1803 Normanby, Yorkshire, England
- Died: 1 October 1881 (aged 78) Portree, Skye, Scotland
- Resting place: Greyfriars Kirkyard
- Children: Sir William Baillie-Hamilton; Charles Baillie-Hamilton
- Parents: Charles Baillie-Hamilton (father); Charlotte Home (mother)

Military service
- Branch: Royal Navy
- Service years: 1816–1865
- Rank: Admiral

Admiral William Alexander Baillie-Hamilton (6 June 1803 – 1 October 1881) was a Scottish naval commander who served as Second Secretary to the Admiralty from 28 April 1845 to 22 May 1855.

== Biography ==
A member of the Baillie-Hamilton family headed by the Earl of Haddington, he was the son of the Venerable Charles Baillie-Hamilton, Archdeacon of Cleveland and his wife Lady Charlotte Home, daughter of Alexander Home, 9th Earl of Home. Three of his brothers also gained distinction. Sir George Baillie was Ambassador to Tuscany; Charles Baillie-Hamilton was a politician; Ker Baillie-Hamilton was Governor of the Leeward Islands; and Cospatrick Baillie-Hamilton was also an admiral in the Royal Navy.

He married Harriet Hamilton (1812–1884), daughter of James Hamilton, Viscount Hamilton, in 1836. They had two daughters and four sons. A gravestone with the names inscribed of William Alexander Baillie-Hamilton's and that of his wife, Harriet, lies in Greyfriars Churchyard, Edinburgh. He is listed as having died in Portree, on the Isle of Skye.

His son, also William (1844–1920), played football for Scotland in the first of the England v Scotland representative football matches (1870–1872) and was later a senior civil servant. Another son, Charles (1848–1927), also played for Scotland in the same match.

Military offices
Preceded by John Barrow	Second Secretary to the Admiralty; 1845–1855	Succeeded by Thomas Phinn
