= Sir James Kirkpatrick, 8th Baronet =

Scottish Baonet and sportsman (1841–1899)

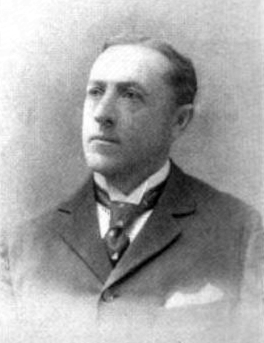
- In The Sketch, 16 March 1898
- Born: 22 March 1841; Canada
- Died: 10 November 1899 (aged 58); Forest Hill, Kent, England
- Occupations: Sportsman, Admiralty clerk
- Spouse: Mary Steward (m. 1872)
- Children: 6

Sir James Kirkpatrick, 8th Baronet (22 March 1841 – 10 November 1899) was the 8th Kirkpatrick Baronet of Closeburn, Dumfriesshire. In his youth he was a keen sportsman, and helped organise the Scottish football team in the representative matches between March 1870 and February 1872. He also played in goal for the Wanderers when they won the FA Cup in 1878.

== Family and professional career ==
Kirkpatrick was born in Canada, the second son of Sir Charles Sharpe Kirkpatrick, 6th Baronet and Helen Stuart Kirk. His father died in 1867 at which time his brother, Thomas, succeeded to the title; Thomas died childless in 1880 and the title passed to James.

He was educated privately before joining the Admiralty as a clerk where he progressed to become Private Secretary to Lord George Hamilton, the First Lord of the Admiralty.

He married Mary Steward of Peckham, Surrey on 24 April 1872 and they had six children:

- Josephine Mary Kirkpatrick (1873–1948)
- Charles Sharpe Kirkpatrick (1874–1937) who succeeded his father as the 9th Baronet.
- Harry Fearnley Kirkpatrick (1876–1918), Lt. Colonel in The East Kent Regiment (3rd Foot), who was killed in the First World War.
- Margaret Hope Kirkpatrick (1878–1945)
- Yvone Kirkpatrick (1879–1924), worked for the political service in Nigeria.
- Athole Kirkpatrick (1885–1917), 2nd Lieutenant in The East Kent Regiment (3rd Foot), who was also killed in the First World War.

Kirkpatrick died at the family home in Forest Hill, Kent on 10 November 1899, aged 58.

== Football career ==
Kirkpatrick was a member of the Civil Service Football Club and also of the Wanderers. His first Wanderers appearance came on 2 February 1867 in a 1–0 defeat by C.C.C. on Clapham Common; the team sheet for that match also includes a "C. Kirkpatrick", possibly his younger brother Charles. He became a frequent member of the Wanderers XI, making a total of 58 appearances over the next 11 years, generally as goalkeeper although he played occasionally as an outfield player, even scoring two goals, against Forest Club in 1870 and Gitanos in 1876.

In the Football Annual for 1875, he was described as "a goalkeeper [who] is always excellent, and Surrey owes much to him in that position" while the 1879 edition said that he was "a very useful goalkeeper; fields well, and does not lose his head". Other editions described him as "a useful player all round, a good back and excellent goalkeeper". By 1874, he was chiefly known as a goalkeeper, whose "flying days [were] numbered in the past".

In 1870, he helped Arthur Kinnaird to organise the Scottish team to play against England in the first of the series of international football matches. The Scotsmen were all based in London and the Home Counties. The advertisement placed in the Sportsman newspaper stated:

A match between the leading representatives of the Scotch and English sections will be played at The Oval on Saturday 19 February, under the auspices of the Football Association. Players duly qualified and desirous of assisting either party must communicate with Mr AF Kinnaird of 2 Pall Mall East, SW or Mr J Kirkpatrick, Admiralty, Somerset House, WC on behalf of the Scotch, or with Mr Charles W Alcock, Boy Court, Ludgate Hill, EC or Mr RG Graham, 7 Finch Lane, EC on the part of the English.

For the inaugural international match, Kirkpatrick was Scotland's goalkeeper and captain. The Scots opened the scoring with a quarter of an hour to play after England's goalkeeper was moved upfield thus allowing Robert Crawford to score with a shot from distance. England fought back to score through Alfred Baker to salvage a draw a minute from the end of the game. Kirkpatrick retained his place for the next three international matches, being captain again in the second.

Although he had first played for the Wanderers in 1867, he was rarely available for their FA Cup ties. He was, however, an "umpire" for the first FA Cup Final in 1872. In 1877–78, he played in every round helping Wanderers to reach the final where they met a team from the Royal Engineers. The final was played at the Kennington Oval on 23 March 1878, the day after Kirkpatrick's 37th birthday. In the match, Kirkpatrick suffered a broken arm after fifteen minutes during a tussle on the goal-line; despite his injury, he managed to keep the ball out of the goal, and went on to play the remainder of the match despite his injury. Wanderers won the match 3–1 in their last appearance in the Final, thus claiming the trophy for the fifth time in seven years. The 1878 FA Cup Final was Kirkpatrick's final appearance for the Wanderers.

He also represented Surrey and served on the Football Association committee from 1869 to 1872.

== Cricket career ==
Kirkpatrick also played cricket for the Civil Service, Lansdown and Chiswick & Turnham Green clubs between 1863 and 1879 and played for the Gentlemen of the South in a first-class match against the Gentlemen of the North in July 1867 taking three wickets as his side claimed an eight wicket victory.

Baronetage of Nova Scotia
Preceded by Thomas Kirkpatrick	Baronet (of Closeburn); 1880–1899	Succeeded by James Sharpe Kirkpatrick
