= Thomas Southey Baker =

English sportsman (1848–1902)

Thomas Southey Baker (29 June 1848 – 24 June 1902) was an amateur sportsman who was on the winning crew that won The Boat Race in 1869 and played for England in the fourth unofficial football match against Scotland in November 1871. He subsequently became a teacher at Dunedin in New Zealand. He was the father of Eleanor Southey Baker McLaglan, a pioneering surgeon in New Zealand.

== Early life and education ==
Baker was born in Droxford, Hampshire, the son of Dr Thomas Baker and his wife, Sophia Jane Southey. Baker attended Lancing College between 1861 and 1867, where he played both football and cricket for the school. He was considered the "outstanding athlete of his generation" at Lancing College and his sporting abilities resulted in him twice being crowned victor ludorum by the college.

In 1867, Baker went up to Queen's College, Oxford. At Oxford, he rowed three times in The Boat Race against Cambridge, being on the winning side in 1869 and losing in 1870 and 1871, and also played football for the University.

Baker graduated from Oxford University in 1871, with a Bachelor of Arts degree.

== Football career ==
He later played football for Clapham Rovers, alongside R.S.F. Walker and Jarvis Kenrick, all of whom were selected to play for the England XI against a Scotland XI at The Surrey Cricket Ground, The Oval, Kennington on 18 November 1871. This was the fourth unofficial match between the two countries, which England won 2–1, with Walker scoring both England's goals.

== Teaching career ==
On graduating from Oxford, Baker was briefly a school master at Whitgift School in Croydon, before emigrating to New Zealand in 1873. He sailed to New Zealand on board the SS Dallam Tower. The ship eventually reached Port Chalmers, New Zealand, after a dramatic voyage in which she lost a mast and travelled 2,000 miles under a jury rig.

Baker had originally planned to set up business in the flax industry but instead he established a private school at French Farm, at Akaroa near Christchurch. He continued to maintain his interest in sport, winning the athletics championship at Timaru in 1878 and playing cricket for Canterbury between 1874 and 1880, including three first-class matches.

In 1890, he moved to Tasmania, where he taught for two years at Christ College in Hobart, before returning to New Zealand in 1892. He then established the Goodwood House prep school at Otago. In 1896, he became manager of a boarding house at Otago Boys' High School, Dunedin; his contract gave him the right to conduct his own school on the premises. Baker remained at Dunedin until he died suddenly in June 1902, aged 53. He was buried in Dunedin Northern Cemetery.

== Family ==
Baker married Josephine Dicken in Christchurch in December 1878. They had four daughters, including Eleanor, the eldest, who became a doctor and surgeon in remote areas of New Zealand's North Island.

== Bibliography ==
- Burnell, Richard (1979). One Hundred and Fifty Years of the Oxford and Cambridge Boat Race. Precision Press. ISBN 0950063878.
- Drinkwater, G. C.; Sanders, T. R. B. (1929). The University Boat Race – Official Centenary History. Cassell & Company, Ltd.
- MacMichael, William Fisher (1870). The Oxford and Cambridge Boat Races: From A.D. 1829 to 1869. Deighton. p. 375.
- Mitchell, Andy (2012). First Elevens: The Birth of International Football. Andy Mitchell Media. ISBN 978-1475206845.
