= Hamilton-Baillie =

Hamilton-Baillie is a family name. Notable members include:

- Ben Hamilton-Baillie, architect and designer
- Brigadier Jock Hamilton-Baillie, MC (né John Robert Edward Hamilton-Baillie), persistent prison camp escaper and Colditz inmate

== See also ==
- Baillie-Hamilton
