= Fitzgerald Copland-Crawford =

Scottish footballer

Fitzgerald Hamilton Paul Copland-Crawford FRGS (5 May 1854 – 7 October 1894) was a Scottish amateur footballer who made two appearances in the representative matches in 1871 and 1872.

== Family ==
Crawford was born in Edinburgh, the son of Lieutenant-Colonel Robert Fitzgerald Crawford of the Royal Regiment of Artillery, and his wife, Jane Dalrymple Anderson.

The family name was changed to "Copland-Crawford" in September 1872.

== Football career ==
Crawford was a member of the Harrow Chequers club, where he played alongside his elder brother Robert against the Wanderers in the opening match of the 1871–72 season, which ended scoreless. In the match report in the Morning Post on Monday, 16 October 1871, the Crawford brothers were commended for being "conspicuous for excellent play". Both brothers were later to become members of the Wanderers club.

Crawford also played alongside his brother in the matches between England and Scotland played on 18 November 1871 and 24 February 1872, which both ended with victories for England. In the report on the final match, he and his brother were praised for their "untiring forward play throughout".

== Life outside football ==
At the time of the 1871 census, Crawford was living with his father at the family home in Harrow. In the 1881 and 1891 censuses, he is recorded in Chelsea, described as Fellow of the Royal Geographical Society.

He died on 7 October 1894 in London, a few months after his brother.
