= George Hamilton-Gordon =

George Hamilton-Gordon may refer to:

- George Hamilton-Gordon, 4th Earl of Aberdeen (1784–1860), Peelite politician and British prime minister
- George Hamilton-Gordon, 5th Earl of Aberdeen (1816–1864), Liberal politician
- George Hamilton-Gordon, 6th Earl of Aberdeen (1841–1870), Scottish peer
- George Hamilton-Gordon, 2nd Baron Stanmore (1871–1957), Liberal politician

== See also ==
- George Gordon (disambiguation)
- Earl of Aberdeen
