= James Freeth (cricketer) =

English cricketer

Personal information
- Full name: James William Owen Freeth
- Born: 9 April 1974 (age 52); Bournemouth, Dorset, England
- Batting: Right-handed
- Bowling: Right-arm off break

Domestic team information
- Years: Team
- 1995–1997: Cambridge University

Career statistics
Competition	First-class
Matches	14
Runs scored	44
Batting average	5.50
100s/50s	–/–
Top score	18
Balls bowled	2,157
Wickets	19
Bowling average	70.00
5 wickets in innings	–
10 wickets in match	–
Best bowling	4/101
Catches/stumpings	4/–
- Source: Cricinfo, 31 December 2021

James William Owen Freeth (born 9 April 1974) is an English former first-class cricketer.

Freeth was born at Bournemouth in April 1974. He was educated at Sherborne School, before going up to Pembroke College, Cambridge. While studying at Cambridge, he played first-class cricket for Cambridge University Cricket Club from 1995 to 1997, making fourteen appearances. Playing as an off break bowler, he took 19 wickets at an average of 70 runs per wicket; his best bowling figures were 4 for 101 vs Derbyshire, including the late DM Jones of Australia.
