= Andrew Freeth =

British painter

Hubert Andrew Freeth RA (29 December 1912 – 26 March 1986) was a British portrait painter and etcher.

== Biography ==
Freeth was born in Birmingham and attended the Birmingham College of Art and, between 1936 and 1939, studied at the British School in Rome. From 1936 onwards, Freeth exhibited regularly at the Royal Academy, the Royal Watercolour Society and elsewhere.

During World War Two, Freeth served in the Middle East as an official war artist to the Royal Air Force. The War Artists' Advisory Committee commissioned two lithographs from Freeth. During the War, he also worked on the Recording Britain project.

Freeth was one of the first artists to make the people of the Black Country the main subject of his work, as other artists placed greater emphasis on representing the industrial landscape. Freeth won the prestigious Prix de Rome in engraving in 1936 and 1937, for his series of Black Country images. After the war, the National Coal Board commissioned Freeth to produce works about mine-workers due to the success of his representation of the people of the Black Country.

Freeth was elected to the Royal Academy in 1965 and taught at St Martin's School of Art and the Central School of Art in London. Freeth's work is held in a number of public collections, including Birmingham Museums Trust, National Football Museum, Royal Academy of Arts and a number of university collections. Freeth was a friend of fellow artist Raymond Teague Cowern who was also born in Birmingham.

== Family ==
Andrew married Roseen (née Preston). They had three sons, Martin Freeth, Tony Freeth, and Richard Freeth. Andrew's nephew is Peter Freeth, also a Royal Academician.
