= Martin Freeth =

British television producer and director (1944–2021)

Martin Freeth (1944–2021) was a filmmaker for the British Broadcasting Corporation.

== Career ==
Martin Freeth made science television programs and films for the BBC for nearly 3 decades and was one of the leaders who pushed the BBC into the digital age. Martin Freeth was a producer of the BBC program, "Horizon" from 1971 to 1997.

Martin started working with BBC Science in 1971 for the BBC series, "Horizon" where he worked on 16 episodes. He also worked on BBC shows "Antenna" and "Tomorrow's World." Starting out as an editor, he later produced and directed many BBC films including "The Burke Special," "The Trouble with Medicine," and "The Mind Machine."

In 1995 he set up the BBC Multimedia Centre. Martin helped create the interactive media awards at BAFTA. Martin Freeth worked with David Puttnam (David Terence Puttnam, Baron Puttnam, CBE, HonFRSA, HonFRPS, MRIA) to found NESTA (The National Endowment for Science, Technology and the Arts) where he was deputy director. Martin was a managing director of NESTA Futurelab in Bristol, UK.

=== Biography ===
Martin Freeth was born in Cairo, Egypt, to two British parents who worked in intelligence during the Second World War. Martin's mother was Roseen (née Preston) and Andrew Freeth, RA who was a noted artist who created drawings, paintings and engravings of the people of the Black Country and is especially noted for his depictions of miners. Andrew was a Royal Academician as is his nephew (Martin's cousin) Peter Freeth, RA.

Martin Freeth spent most of his childhood in Northwood, UK, and graduated from Southampton University, UK. He earned a master's degree from the Royal College of Art.

Martin married Averil Bagshaw in 1966. Martin and Averil's daughters are Kate and Ellen, born in 1978 and 1981.

Averil died September 19, 2019.

Martin died March 5, 2021, of cancer.

=== Filmography ===
Filmography
Year	Title	Role	Notes
1976	Horizon Series 13, Episode 7, "The Long Valley"	Director	
1977	Horizon Special, "Darwin's Dream"	Producer	
1979	Einstein's Universe	Director	
1979	Horizon Series 16	Director	
1980	Horizon Series 17, Episode 5, "The Other Kenya"	Director	
1980	Horizon Series 17, Episode 13, "The Spike"	Director	
1981	The Comet is Coming	Director	
1982	Horizon Series 19, Episode 16, "What Little Girls Are Made Of"	Director	
1982	Horizon Special	Director	
1982	Horizon, "Finding a Voice"	Producer	Robert Kennedy film award
1983	Horizon Series 20, Episode 12, "The Intelligence Man"	Director	
1988	The Mind Machine, Series 1, Episode 5	Director	
1988	The Mind Machine, Series 1, Episode 10	Director	
1988	The Mind Machine, Series 1, Episode 13	Director	
1990	Tomorrow's World: 25th Birthday	Director	
1993	The Trouble with medicine. [Part 1]	Co-producer	with Stefan Moore
1994	Antenna	Director	
1994	Horizon Series 31, Episode 1, "Deaf Whale, Dead Whale"	Director	
2021	The Antikythera Cosmos	Director	

=== BBC Multimedia Centre ===
At the BBC Multimedia Centre, Freeth assembled a team of specialists, with skills across technology, production, content creation, writing, design, and audiovisual. Under his stewardship the team developed experimental interactive productions to test the potential of television in the coming digital age. This work was often done as so-called ‘Smart Production’ - coordinating with other departments such as BBC Music and Arts and BBC Northern Ireland. The Multimedia Centre also developed the first iteration of the BBC website, which would go on to become BBC Online. Throughout, Martin promoted the role of emerging digital technologies and their importance to the future offering of the BBC.
