= Kirkpatrick baronets =

Baronetcy in the Baronetage of Nova Scotia

Escutcheon of the Kirkpatrick baronets, of Closeburn

The Kirkpatrick baronetcy, of Closeburn in the County of Dumfries, is a title in the Baronetage of Nova Scotia. It was created on 26 March 1685 for Thomas Kirkpatrick, with remainder to heirs male whatsoever. The family seat of the Kirkpatrick family was Closeburn Castle, Dumfriesshire.

Sir James Kirkpatrick, 8th Baronet, was a keen amateur footballer in his youth and appeared in goal for the Wanderers in the 1878 FA Cup Final.

== Kirkpatrick baronets, of Closeburn (1685) ==
- Sir Thomas Kirkpatrick, 1st Baronet (died c. 1695)
- Sir Thomas Kirkpatrick, 2nd Baronet (died c. 1730)
- Sir Thomas Kirkpatrick, 3rd Baronet (1704–1771)
- Sir James Kirkpatrick, 4th Baronet (died 1804)
- Sir Thomas Kirkpatrick, 5th Baronet (1777–1844)
- Sir Charles Sharpe Kirkpatrick, 6th Baronet (1811–1867)
- Sir Thomas Kirkpatrick, 7th Baronet (1839–1880)
- Sir James Kirkpatrick, 8th Baronet (1841–1899)
- Sir Charles Sharpe Kirkpatrick, 9th Baronet (1874–1937)
- Sir James Alexander Kirkpatrick, 10th Baronet (1918–1954)
- Sir Ivone Elliott Kirkpatrick, 11th Baronet (born 1942)

== Extended family ==
Charles Kirkpatrick (1879–1955), grandson of Roger Kirkpatrick, second son of fourth Baronet, was a major general in the British Army. His son Herbert James Kirkpatrick (1910–1977) was an air vice-marshal in the Royal Air Force.
