= George Gordon (New South Wales cricketer) =

Australian cricketer

Personal information
- Born: 20 September 1846; New England, New South Wales, Australia
- Died: 18 May 1923 (aged 76); Sydney, Australia
- Source: ESPNcricinfo, 30 December 2016

George Gordon (20 September 1846 – 18 May 1923) was an Australian cricketer. He played two first-class matches for New South Wales between 1866/67 and 1867/68.

== See also ==
- List of New South Wales representative cricketers
