= George Gordon (Victoria cricketer) =

Australian cricketer

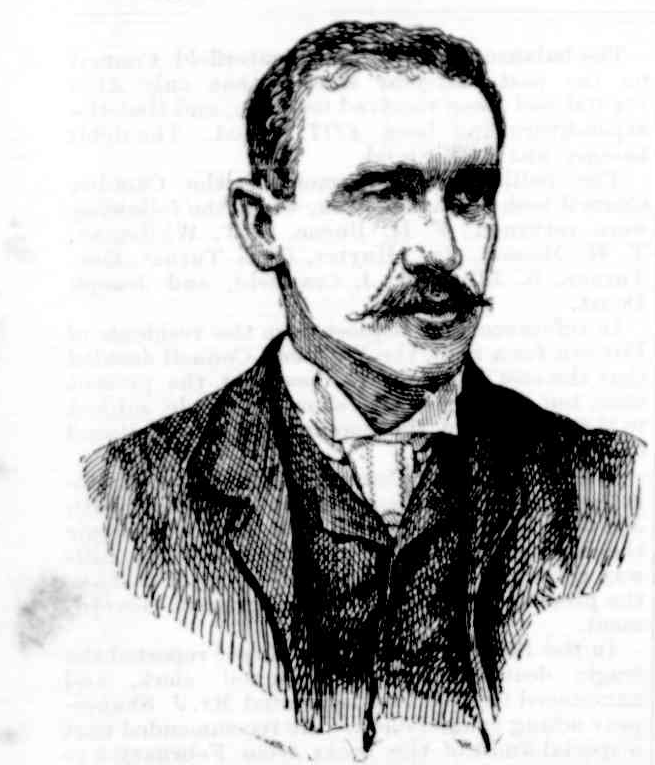

Personal information
- Born: 12 August 1860; Melbourne, Colony of Victoria
- Died: 5 March 1946 (aged 85); Sydney, Australia

Domestic team information
- Years: Team
- 1881-1889: Victoria
- Source: Cricinfo, 22 July 2015

George B Gordon (12 August 1860 – 5 March 1946) was an Australian cricketer. He played five first-class cricket matches for Victoria between 1881 and 1889.

== See also ==
- List of Victoria first-class cricketers
