= Montague Muir Mackenzie =

Scottish barrister and legal writer

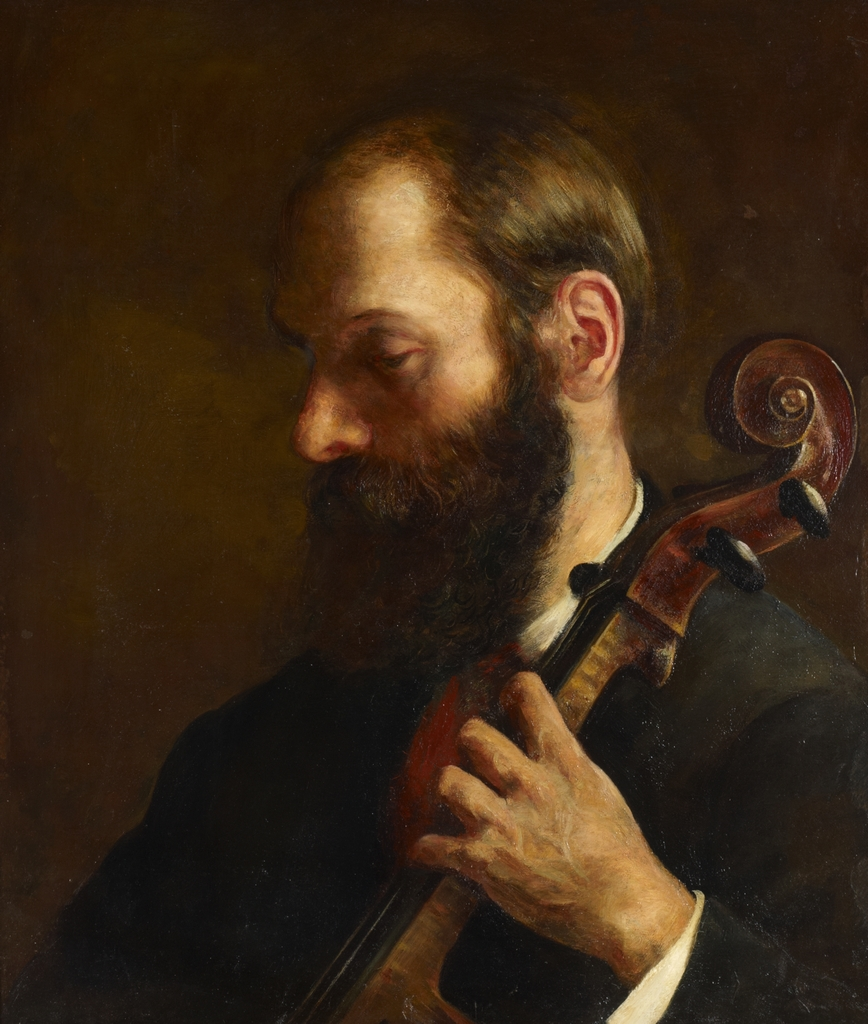
Painting by Susan Annie Eliza Muir Mackenzie, 1893-1903

Montague Johnstone Muir Mackenzie (29 September 1847 – 18 April 1919) was a Scottish barrister, legal writer, and Official Referee of the High Court. A bankruptcy specialist, he had a reputation as being "the bankruptcy attorney-general". In his youth, he was a keen sportsman and played football for Scotland in the last of the representative matches played in 1872.

== Family and education ==
Muir Mackenzie was born on 29 September 1847, the eighth of ten children of Sir John William Muir Mackenzie, Bt. and his wife, Sophia (née Johnstone). He was the younger brother of Kenneth Muir Mackenzie, 1st Baron Muir Mackenzie. He was baptised on 29 October 1847 at Caputh in Perthshire, close to the family home at Delvine.

He was educated at Charterhouse School between 1860 and 1866 before going up to Hertford College, Oxford University. He graduated with a BA degree in 1870 and became a Fellow.

On 17 August 1888, he married the Hon. Sarah Napier Bruce, daughter of Henry Austin Bruce, 1st Baron Aberdare. They had one child, Enid, born on 25 June 1889; she died on 17 November 1952, unmarried.

== Sporting career ==
During his time at Charterhouse, Muir Mackenzie was a regular member of the school cricket XI between 1864 and 1866 often playing alongside his brother Kenneth. In a match against Marylebone Cricket Club in August 1866, he took six wickets in the first innings; despite this, the M.C.C. won the match by three wickets.

He also played football for Charterhouse, being listed in their team in 1865. He was selected to represent Scotland in the last of the representative matchesplayed against England on 24 February 1872. Muir Mackenzie played in goal for part of the game, alternating with Charles Nepean; the match ended in a 1–0 victory for the English, with a goal from J. C. Clegg. In many present-day databases, Muir Mackenzie is confused with his elder brother, Kenneth, who played for Scotland on 5 March 1870.

== Legal career ==
Muir Mackenzie was enrolled as a pupil barrister at Lincoln's Inn in January 1869 and called to the bar on 27 January 1873.

He was a bencher of the Middle Temple and was a member of the South-eastern Circuit. He became Official Referee of the Supreme Court and held the offices of Recorder of Sandwich and Deal in Kent, and of Justice of the Peace (J.P.) for Gloucestershire. He resigned his position as recorder in 1905 and was replaced by Patrick Rose-Innes.

=== Publications ===
Muir Mackenzie was joint editor of "Wilson's Supreme Court of Judicature Acts and Rules" published in 1900. His other publications included:

- Bills of Lading: a handbook (1881)
- Index to the Rules of the Supreme Court (1883) (Joint author with Mackenzie Dalzell Chalmers)
- The Supreme Court Funds Rules (1884) (Joint author with Charles Arnold White)
- The Companies Winding-up Practice (1890) (Joint author with Charles John Stewart)
- Company Law: An Abridgment of the Law Contained in the Statutes and Decisions (1893) (Joint author with Edward Arundel Geare and Gawayne Baldwin Hamilton) (Re-published December 2010)
- The Parliamentary and Local Government Registration Manual (1897) (Joint author with Sydney George Lushington)
- The Bankruptcy Acts, 1883 to 1890 (1902)
- The Public Trustee Act, 1906, with rules, fees and official forms (1908) (Joint author with Kenneth Muir Mackenzie and Charles John Stewart)
- The Parliamentary and Local Government Registration Manual (1909)
- Notes on the Temple Organ (1911) (Joint author with Edmund Macrory)
- The Bankruptcy Act, 1914, and the Deeds of Arrangement Act 1914 (1915) (Joint author with Francis Aubrey Clarke)
