= Augustus Nepean =

English cricketer

Augustus Adolphus St John Nepean (24 June 1849 – 24 January 1933) was an English first-class cricketer active 1876–77 who played for Middlesex and Marylebone Cricket Club (MCC). He was born and died in Westminster.
