= Charles Nepean =

English amateur sportsman and vicar

Personal information
- Full name: Charles Edward Burroughs Nepean
- Born: 5 February 1851; Mayfair, London, England
- Died: 26 March 1903 (aged 52); Lenham, Kent, England
- Batting: Right-handed
- Bowling: Underarm slow
- Role: Wicket-keeper
- Relatives: A. A. Nepean (brother), E. A. Nepean (nephew)

Domestic team information
- Years: Team
- 1870–1873: Oxford University
- 1873–1874: Middlesex
- 1873: Gentlemen
- First-class debut: 26 May 1870 Oxford University v M.C.C.
- Last First-class: 18 June 1874 Middlesex v Oxford University

Career statistics
Competition	First-class
Matches	10
Runs scored	290
Batting average	18.12
100s/50s	0/1
Top score	50
Balls bowled
Wickets
Bowling average
5 wickets in innings
10 wickets in match
Best bowling
Catches/stumpings	6/7
- Source: cricketarchive, 19 February 2011

The Rev. Charles Edward Burroughs Nepean (5 February 1851 – 26 March 1903) was an English amateur cricketer and footballer who later became a vicar in the Church of England. As a cricketer he played ten first-class matches for Oxford University and Middlesex between 1870 and 1874, whilst in football he was in goal for Oxford University, the winning side in the 1874 FA Cup Final.

== Early life and education ==
Nepean was born in Mayfair, London, the youngest of 13 children of Rev. Canon Evan Nepean (1800–1873) and Anne Fust. His father was the son of Sir Evan Nepean, 1st Baronet and was the Canon of Westminster and a Chaplain in Ordinary to Queen Victoria.

Nepean was educated at Charterhouse School between 1861 and 1869 before going up to University College, Oxford. At Charterhouse, he was a regular member of the school cricket XI.

== Family ==
Nepean was one of thirteen children (six girls, seven boys). His elder brother, Augustus Adolphus Nepean (1849–1933) (known as "Dolly") was also a cricketer with Middlesex as was his nephew, Evan Alcock Nepean (1865–1906).

Nepean's brother, Evan Colville Nepean (1836–1908), father of Evan Alcock Nepean, had several children, including a daughter, Emily Margaret (1867–1950). She married Felton George Randolph; their daughter, Margaret Isabel (1901–2001) married James Cassilis MacLean and in turn had a daughter, Fynvola Susan (1933–2001). Fynvola married James Murray Grant in 1957; their children included Hugh Grant (born 1960), the actor.

Charles Nepean died unmarried in 1903.

== Sporting career ==
=== Cricket ===
On his arrival at Oxford, Nepean had a good reputation as a batsman. He made his debut for the University against M.C.C. on 26 May 1870, scoring 11 and 8 in a match won by the M.C.C. by 6 wickets. His next first-class match came at the end of June against Surrey, when he played as the wicket-keeper, claiming three wickets, including those of Surrey's top-scorers, Leonard Howell and Richard Humphrey; the university won the match by 3 wickets.

According to his obituary in Wisden, "his future at Oxford seemed assured, but from some cause he did not get a place in the eleven till his last year"; he was described as "an admirable batsman, with a very neat and business-like style". His next first-class appearance came in May 1873 against M.C.C. In the summer of 1873, he played regularly including the two wicket victory over Middlesex in June and the match against Cambridge University at Lords, scoring 22 and 50 (his top first-class score), helping Cuthbert Ottaway to gain a victory by three wickets and for Nepean to obtain his blue.

On the strength of his performances for Oxford he was selected for the Gentlemen in the first Gentlemen v Players match to be played at the Prince's Cricket Ground, in Chelsea. The Gentleman won the match by an innings and 54 runs, with A. N. Hornby and W.G. Grace scoring 104 and 70 respectively, and Grace and his brother Fred claiming 11 wickets between them.

This match came between Nepean's two appearances for Middlesex against M.C.C. in June 1873 (when Nepean was again wicket-keeper) and against his former university in June 1874. Both matches ended in defeats for the county side.

Following his ordination, he no longer played first-class cricket, although he was a member of the Kent committee, thus keeping him in touch with the game.

=== Football ===
Charles Nepean
Personal information
- Position: Goalkeeper

Senior career*
Years	Team	Apps	(Gls)
1870–1874	Oxford University		
- * Club domestic league appearances and goals

At Oxford, Nepean also played football, winning a blue. In November 1870, he was selected by Arthur Kinnaird to represent "Scotland" in the second pseudo-international match against the English side, organised by Charles Alcock. The Scottish XI was made up from players from London and the Home Counties with "Scottish connections". (In his biography of Arthur Kinnaird, Andy Mitchell says that Nepean's "closest link to Scotland was a cousin who married a Scot.")

According to the report on the match played at the Kennington Oval on 19 November 1870, "proceedings were commenced with a kick-off by C.E.B. Nepean on behalf of the Scottish team". The English won the match with a single goal from R.S.F. Walker; for the "Scotch", "C.E.B. Nepean . . . was a perfect rock in the way of defence".

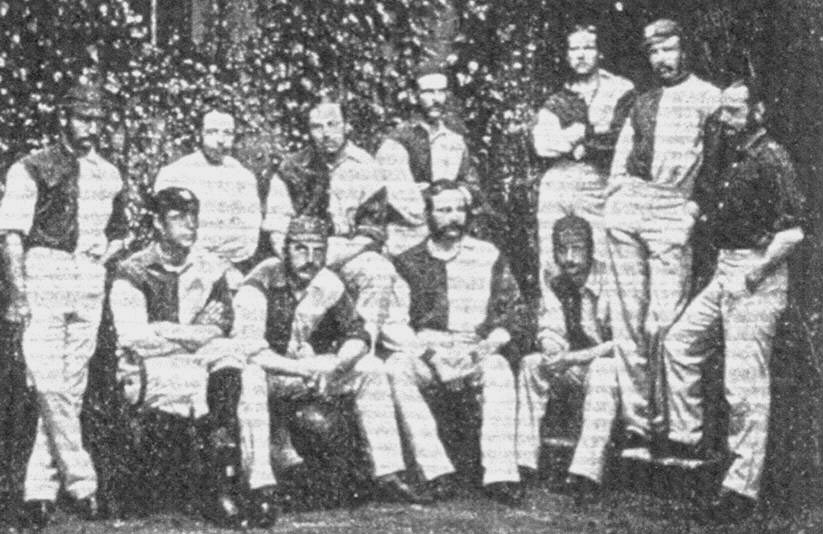
Oxford University's F.A. Cup winning side of 1874 (Nepean standing at back, first on the right).

Nepean retained his place in the Scottish team for the next three games, playing in various positions. In the match on 25 February 1871, Nepean scored the Scottish goal in a 1–1 draw; the match report says "about a quarter of an hour after the kick-off a loud shout proclaimed the fall of the English goal – an achievement entirely due to the play of C.E. Nepean". With England equalising through R.S.F. Walker, the match ended "leaving the question of supremacy undecided". The report comments: "to C. E. Nepean, Q. Hogg and W. H. Gladstone was mainly due the successful defence of [the Scottish] lines against a series of well-organised attacks".

In the last of the pseudo-internationals, played on 24 February 1872, Nepean played in goal for part of the game, alternating with M. J. Muir Mackenzie; this match ended in a 1–0 victory for the English, with a goal from J. C. Clegg.

In 1872, Oxford University entered a team in the FA Cup for the first time, reaching the final against the Wanderers. Nepean had become the university's first-choice goalkeeper but was unavailable for the final, which was won 2–0 by the Wanderers.

The university reached the final again in 1874; this time Nepean was available to play in goal. In the match against the Royal Engineers, Nepean repeatedly thwarted the Engineers' attempts on goal. Oxford won the match 2–0 and secured the cup.

He was also a member of the Wanderers club.

== Later career ==
On leaving Oxford in 1874, Nepean entered the Church of England and in 1876 he was appointed as vicar of Lenham in Kent.

In 1894, he was appointed as vice-chairman at the inaugural meeting of Lenham Parish Council.

He died on 26 March 1903 at Lenham, aged 52 years and 49 days.

== Sporting honours ==
Oxford University

- FA Cup winner: 1874
