= Alfred Joseph Baker =

British sportsman

Alfred Baker
Personal information
- Born: 10 February 1846 Willesden, London
- Died: 3 January 1900 (aged 53) Willesden, London

Sport
- Sport: Football/Athletics
- Event: 100 yards
- Club: London Athletic Club

Alfred Joseph Baker (10 February 1846 – 3 January 1900) was an English amateur sportsman who scored England's goal in the first representative match against a Scottish XI in March 1870. By profession, he was an auctioneer.

== Family ==
He was born in Willesden, London, the son of Henry Baker and Margaret Puddicombe. On his baptism record, his father's occupation was given as "auctioneer".

He married Marion Ellen Sayers on 16 September 1871. They had several children, including:

- Maud Marion Baker (1872–1960)
- Alfred Henry Baker (1873–1903)
- Beatrice Ellen Baker (born c.1874)
- Ralph Baker (born 1875), educated at Harrow and Tonbridge Schools.
- Marion Kate Baker (born 1877)
- Hubert Samuel Baker (1886–c.1973)

== Athletics ==
Baker was a champion athlete who won the 100-yard dash at the 1870 AAC Championships; his achievement "raised himself to the first rank of sprint runners". In 1894, he was described as "probably the fastest Londoner over the distance until quite recent times"; his style was described as "a sprinter pure and simple (who) 'ran low', in what is to our mind the best and most workmanlike sprinting style, with his body bent well forward".

== Football ==
Baker was a member of the N.N. Club of Kilburn. In 1866, he represented the "London" (F.A.) team in the London v Sheffield match. In January 1867, he was selected to represent Kent in a match against Surrey, which finished 0–0. He also played for Middlesex against both Surrey and Kent later that year and was a member of the Football Association committee in 1872.

In March 1870, he was one of only two players not from a public school background (the other being Alexander Nash) selected to represent England against a Scottish side in the first of a series of matches between the two countries organised by C. W. Alcock and Arthur Kinnaird. The match was played at the Oval on 5 March; the Scots scored first when Robert Crawford lobbed the ball into an open goal. With a minute left to play, Baker made a "brilliant run" which "effected the surrender of the Scottish goal" and the game ended in a draw. Baker's run was described in the Sporting Gazette as "one of the finest runs that have ever been witnessed".

Baker retained his place for the next game, played on 19 November 1870; R.S.F. Walker scored an early goal for England and, despite energetic play by the Scots, there was no further score. The report in "Bell's Life" on 26 November said: "Ends being changed, Mr. Baker made a good attempt to reach the Scotch goal, but failed in effecting a twist when within a few yards of it" and "Mr. Baker having brought it to bear at once drove it under the line, but it was disallowed."

Baker also appeared for the England XI in the third match played on 25 February 1871; the Scotsman newspaper of 27 February reports that Baker kicked off for the England XI. The match ended in a 1–1 draw with goals from Charles Nepean and R. S. F. Walker.

Baker was also a member of the Wanderers club, for which he made his first appearance on 12 November 1864, aged 18; his last was on 25 March 1871. Altogether, he made 58 appearances and scored 15 goals.

== Professional career ==
Like his father, Baker was by profession an auctioneer, trading as Baker & Sons. In July 1875, the firm is listed as selling a property known as The Forge at Egham, Surrey, and in November 1894, they were auctioning a plot of land at Egham.

Baker collapsed and died on 3 January 1900, aged 53, while running to catch a train at Willesden Junction station.
