= Robert Freeth =

Robert Evelyn Freeth (7 April 1886, Dublin – 16 September 1979, Perth) was an Anglican priest and educator.

Freeth was the son of Evelyn Freeth, a civil servant who became an expert on death duties. He was educated at Selwyn College, Cambridge, and ordained in 1910. After missionary service in Melanesia he served his title at Christ Church, North Adelaide. He was Priest in charge of Angaston from 1914 to 1915. He then taught at King's School, Parramatta; St Andrew's Cathedral School, Sydney; Sydney Church of England Grammar School; and Guildford Grammar School, Perth, where he was Head Master from 1928 to 1950. He became Archdeacon of Perth, WA in 1952; and Assistant Bishop of Perth in 1957. He retired in 1963.
