= N.N. Club =

English 19th century football club

N.N. Club, N.N. Kilburn
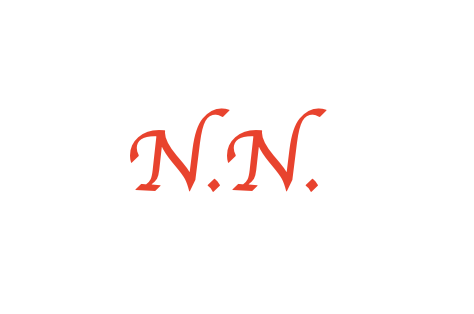
- Full name: No Names Club
- Nickname: The Mudlarks
- Founded: 1863
- Dissolved: 1870
- Ground: Edgware Road
- Secretary: C. M. Green, J. H. Rushworth
Home colours

N.N. Club or N.N. Kilburn—N.N. standing for "No Names" —was an amateur English football club based in the Kilburn district of London.

== History ==
The club's first recorded matches were victories over Barnes F. C. in January and April 1863. It was one of the eleven founding sides of the Football Association on 26 October 1863, and was represented by club captain Arthur Pember, who also had been elected as the FA's first president.

The N.N.s enjoyed goodwill as an FA founder, and in 1866 was one of the mere three clubs that played exclusively Association laws, contributing three players - Pember as captain, Alfred Baker, and C. M. Tebbutt - to the London side in the prestigious inter-association match with the Sheffield Football Association that March. However, the club was never considered one of the elite clubs, and, after Arthur Pember's emigration in 1868, interest in the club dwindled. In the 1869–70 season, the club often had to play without new captain Tebbutt, and by the time of the club's final reported match - a defeat by Upton Park FC on 5 February 1870 - only seven members turned up to play.

The club sent a representative to the annual meeting of the Football Association that month, and two players in the first representative match between England and Scotland on 3 March 1870 (Alfred Baker and George Gordon) are listed as N.N. players, but subsequent published lists of fixtures fail to show any activity from the club and there are no further results for the club available. The club is absent from lists of Football Association members from 1871 onwards.

The Brondesbury club, founded in 1871, was considered a resurrection of N.N. and occasionally listed as Brondesbury N.N.

== Colours ==
The club's colours were blue jerseys, with N.N. embroidered on the chest in red letters.

== Ground ==
The club originally played in a field adjoining the Edgware Road in Kilburn, but did not play any home matches from December 1866 until the next season because it was frequently under water; in 1867 the club secured a pitch near St Mark's Church, a 10-minute walk from Edgware Road station. In 1869 it moved back to Edgware Road, adjoining the station.

== Nickname ==
The club's nickname of the Mudlarks came from the poor state of its original Edgware Road ground, described as a "mire".

== See also ==
- N.N. Club players
