= England v Scotland representative football matches (1870–1872) =

International football matches

Between 1870 and 1872, the Football Association (FA) organised five representative association football matches between teams representing England and Scotland, all held in London. The first of these matches was held at The Oval on 5 March 1870, and the fifth was on 21 February 1872. The matches, which were organised by Charles W. Alcock, are the precursors to modern international football and were referred to as internationals at the time. They are not recognised, however, as full internationals by FIFA as the players competing in the Scotland team were drawn only from London-based Scottish players. They were followed by the 1872 match in Glasgow between Scotland and England which is recognised as the first international match.

== The first match ==
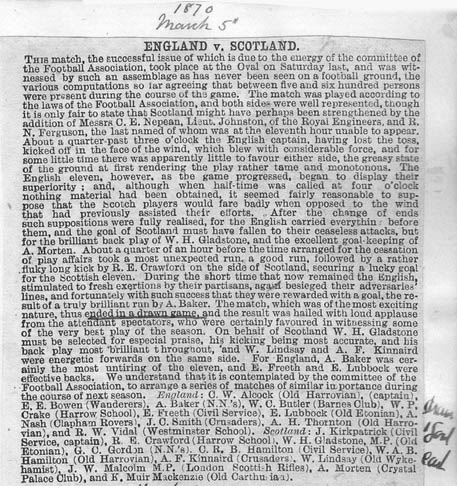
Report of the first match on 5 March 1870, preserved in Arthur Kinnaird's cuttings book

The 1870 match was initiated by Charles W. Alcock who placed advertisements in Scottish newspapers, including the following letter in the Glasgow Herald on 3 November 1870 regarding the second of the five fixtures:

FOOTBALL. ENGLAND V SCOTLAND. Sir, will you allow me a few lines in your newspaper to notify to Scotch players that a match under the above title will take place in London on Sat 10th inst., according to the rules of the Football Association. It is the object of the committee to select the best elevens at their disposal in the two countries, and I cannot but think that the appearance of some of the more prominent celebrities of football on the northern side of the Tweed would do much to disseminate a healthy feeling of good fellowship among the contestants and tend to promote a still greater extent the extension of the game...

The first match, then, was organised by the FA and resulted in a 1–1 draw. The match was delayed two weeks from its advertised date due to excessive frost which had made the ground "dangerously unfit for play". Alcock captained the England team whilst Scotland were led by James Kirkpatrick. The match was 0–0 when the teams changed end at half-time – a rule that The Sporting Gazette of Saturday 12 March 1870 described as new – but Scotland took a lead through a goal by Robert Crawford after England had moved their goalkeeper upfield. England fought back to score through Baker to salvage a draw before the end of the game. W. H. Gladstone, an MP and son of the sitting prime minister W. E. Gladstone, appeared for Scotland and, according to the Manchester Guardian, "did good service on the part of the Scottish team".

5 March 1870

England	1–1	Scotland
Baker 89'	(Report)	Crawford 75'

The Oval, London

Alfred H. Thornton
Charles W. Alcock (c)
Edward E. Bowen
Alfred J. Baker
William C. Butler
William P. Crake
Evelyn Freeth
Edgar Lubbock
Alexander Nash
Giulio C. Smith
Walpole Vidal
Team selection:
(England) Charles W. Alcock

James Kirkpatrick (c)
Robert Crawford
William H. Gladstone MP
George C. Gordon
Charles R. Baillie-Hamilton
William A. Baillie-Hamilton
Arthur F. Kinnaird
William Lindsay
John Wingfield Malcolm MP
Alexander Morten
Kenneth A. Muir Mackenzie
Team selection:
(Scotland) Arthur Kinnaird

== Subsequent matches ==
The following four matches were held on: 19 November 1870, 25 February 1871, 17 November 1871 and 24 February 1872. All matches were advertised in Scottish newspapers, but the players were drawn from those who played by Football Association rules – still limited at the time and largely consisting of only London-based Scottish players. England were victorious 1–0 in the November 1870 match, 2–1 in the November 1871 match and 1–0 in the February 1872 match; the February 1871 match was drawn 1–1. The only recorded attendance figure known is 650, from the second match. Formation data does not exist from three of the matches, but it is known that in the third and fifth matches both teams lined up with a '1–1–8' formation.

=== Results ===
19 November 1870	England	1–0	Scotland	London, England
	Walker 10'	(Summary) (Report)		Stadium: The Oval; Attendance: 650

25 February 1871	England	1–1	Scotland	London, England
	Walker	(Summary)	Nepean 15'	Stadium: The Oval; Attendance: 500+

18 November 1871	England	2–1	Scotland	London, England
	Walker	(Summary)	Renny-Tailyour	Stadium: The Oval

24 February 1872	England	1–0	Scotland	London, England
	Clegg	(Summary)		Stadium: The Oval

=== Player appearances ===
The following players appeared in the five matches. At the time, there was no requirement for a player to be registered with a single club and many players appeared regularly for two or more different clubs.

Country	Player	Club(s)	Appearances	Goals
(England)	Charles W. Alcock	Wanderers and Harrow Pilgrims	5	
(England)	Alfred J. Baker	N.N. Club and Wanderers	3	1
(England)	Thomas S. Baker	Clapham Rovers	1	
(England)	Morton Betts	West Kent, Harrow Chequers and Wanderers	2	
(England)	Alexander Bonsor	Wanderers	1	
(England)	Edward E. Bowen	Wanderers	1	
(England)	William C. Butler	Barnes Club and Civil Service	2	
(England)	Thomas N. Carter	Eton College	1	
(England)	Charles Chenery	Crystal Palace and Wanderers	1	
(England)	Charles Clegg	Wednesday	1	1
(England)	John Cockerell	Brixton Club	2	
(England)	William Crake	Harrow School, Barnes Club, Harrow Chequers and Wanderers	4	
(England)	Evelyn Freeth	Civil Service and Wanderers	1	
(England)	Thomas Hooman	Wanderers	3	
(England)	Jarvis Kenrick	Clapham Rovers	1	
(England)	Edgar Lubbock	Old Etonians, West Kent and Wanderers	5	
(England)	Alexander Nash	Clapham Rovers and Wanderers	1	
(England)	Walter Paton	Harrow School	1	
(England)	Henry J. Preston	Eton College	1	
(England)	Giulio C. Smith	Crusaders and Wanderers	1	
(England)	Charles W. Stephenson	Westminster School and Wanderers	3	
(England)	Albert Thompson	Eton College and Wanderers	2	
(England)	Alfred H. Thornton	Old Harrovians and Wanderers	1	
(England)	Walpole Vidal	Westminster School, Wanderers and Old Westminsters	5	
(England)	Robert S. F. Walker	Clapham Rovers and Wanderers	3	4
(England)	Percy Weston	Barnes Club	2	
(England)	Charles Wollaston	Oxford University and Wanderers	1	
(Scotland)	William Bailey	Civil Service	1	
(Scotland)	Charles R. Baillie-Hamilton	Civil Service	1	
(Scotland)	William A. Baillie-Hamilton	Old Harrovians	1	
(Scotland)	Galfred Congreve	Old Rugbeians	1	
(Scotland)	Fitzgerald H. Crawford	Harrow Chequers and Wanderers	2	
(Scotland)	Robert Crawford	Harrow School, Harrow Chequers and Wanderers	4	1
(Scotland)	Edward H.M. Elliot	Harrow Chequers and Wanderers	2	
(Scotland)	Harold S. Ferguson	Royal Artillery	2	
(Scotland)	William H. Gladstone	Old Etonians and Wanderers	2	
(Scotland)	George C. Gordon	No Names	1	
(Scotland)	Quintin Hogg	Wanderers	2	
(Scotland)	John F. Inglis	Charterhouse School and Wanderers	1	
(Scotland)	Gilbert G. Kennedy	Wanderers	1	
(Scotland)	Arthur Kinnaird	Crusaders and Wanderers	3	
(Scotland)	James Kirkpatrick	Civil Service and Wanderers	4	
(Scotland)	William Lindsay	Old Wykehamists, Rochester Club and Civil Service	5	
(Scotland)	Frederick Maddison	Rochester Club and Oxford University	1	
(Scotland)	John W. Malcolm	London Scottish Rifles	1	
(Scotland)	Hugh Mitchell	Royal Engineers	2	
(Scotland)	Alexander Morten	Crystal Palace and Wanderers	1	
(Scotland)	Kenneth Muir Mackenzie	Old Carthusians	1	
(Scotland)	Montague Muir Mackenzie	Old Carthusians	1	
(Scotland)	Charles Nepean	Oxford University and Wanderers	4	1
(Scotland)	Gilbert E. Primrose	Civil Service	1	
(Scotland)	Henry Primrose	Civil Service	1	
(Scotland)	Edward V. Ravenshaw	Charterhouse School	1	
(Scotland)	Henry W. Renny-Tailyour	Royal Engineers	1	1
(Scotland)	Arnold Kirke Smith	Civil Service and Oxford University	2	
(Scotland)	Robert Smith	Queen's Park	3	
(Scotland)	Henry H. Stewart	Wanderers	1	
(Scotland)	Charles Thompson	Cambridge University and Wanderers	1	

== Reaction and the creation of international football ==
Following the games, there was resentment in Scotland that their team did not contain more home grown players. Alcock himself was categorical about where he felt responsibility for this fact lay, writing in the Scotsman newspaper:

"I must join issue with your correspondent in some instances. First, I assert that of whatever the Scotch eleven may have been composed the right to play was open to every Scotchman [Alcock's italics] whether his lines were cast North or South of the Tweed and that if in the face of the invitations publicly given through the columns of leading journals of Scotland the representative eleven consisted chiefly of Anglo-Scotians ... the fault lies on the heads of the players of the north, not on the management who sought the services of all alike impartially. To call the team London Scotchmen contributes nothing. The match was, as announced, to all intents and purposes between England and Scotland".

Many of the players in Scotland did not play to the FA's rules at the time, inhibiting the possibility of a truly representative match between the two countries. Eventually, the FA decided in its minutes of 3 October 1872 note that:

In order to further the interests of the Association in Scotland, it was decided that during the current season, a team should be sent to Glasgow to play a match v Scotland.

The challenge was eventually taken up by Queen's Park and this match, in 1872 is the earliest international football match recognised by FIFA, though at the time it was considered as a continuation of the previous internationals. In March 1873 the Scottish Football Association was created to support the coordination of football in Scotland, taking on responsibility for selecting Scottish teams, and the Football Association began to take the role as an English only organisation.

== See also ==
- Category:England v Scotland representative footballers (1870–1872)
- England national football team results (unofficial matches)
- Scotland national football team results (unofficial matches)
