= Robert Copland-Crawford =

Scottish soldier and footballer (1852–1894)

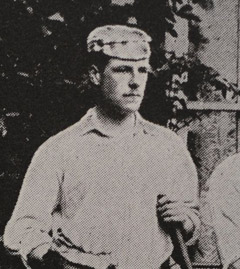
Robert Crawford

Robert Erskine Wade Copland-Crawford (5 September 1852 – 23 May 1894) was a Scottish soldier and amateur sportsman.

He played football four times for Scotland in the representative matches played between 1870 and 1872, scoring the opening goal in the first match. Crawford also played first class cricket for Marylebone Cricket Club (MCC) in 1872 and 1873.

He served in the Afghan War from 1878 to 1880, and was mentioned in dispatches. He was later a police-officer in Sierra Leone, but ended his career in disgrace when he was imprisoned for causing the death of a native by flogging.

== Family and education ==
Crawford was born in Elizabeth Castle, Jersey where his father, Captain Robert Fitzgerald Crawford was serving with the Royal Regiment of Artillery.

He was raised in Edinburgh, before attending Harrow School between 1866 and 1871. At Harrow, he was a member of the school football XI between 1869 and 1871 and represented the school at cricket between 1868 and 1871.

The family name was changed to "Copland-Crawford" in September 1872.

== Sporting career ==
=== Football ===
While still at Harrow School, Crawford was selected to represent Scotland at football in the first "pseudo-international" organised by C. W. Alcock and Arthur Kinnaird in March 1870. Late in the second half, Alcock instructed England's goalkeeper to leave his goal and move upfield in support of the forwards; Crawford took advantage of this and, shooting from distance into an empty goal, gave Scotland the lead with 15 minutes remaining. (The Sporting Gazette of Saturday 12 March 1870 described the goal as "a rather lucky kick" and "almost a fluke".) England equalised in the final minute with a goal from Alfred Baker and the match ended in a 1–1 draw.

Crawford retained his place for the next match between the two sides played on 19 November 1870, which ended in a 1–0 victory for the English and again "played well".

Having missed out on the third match, Crawford, now with the Harrow Chequers club, played in the final two matches on 18 November 1871 and 24 February 1872, which both ended with victories for England. In each of these matches he was joined by his brother, Fitzgerald. According to a report on the November 1871 match, Crawford was "truly unwearied from beginning to end" although "owing to the long journey from Edinburgh, . . . (he) hardly showed his best form." In the report on the final match, he and his brother were praised for their "untiring forward play throughout".

As a member of the Harrow Chequers club, he played (as team captain) alongside his brother against the Wanderers in the opening match of the 1871–72 season, which ended scoreless. In the match report in the Morning Post on Monday, 16 October 1871, the Crawford brothers were commended for being "conspicuous for excellent play". Both brothers were later to become members of the Wanderers club; Robert's last match for the Wanderers was the FA Cup semi-final against Queens Park on 4 March 1872 which ended in a 0–0 draw.

=== Cricket ===
Crawford played cricket for Harrow School between 1868 and 1871. His best performances for the school came against a side from Lords and Commons on 10 June 1871 when he scored 72 runs and took four wickets with his underarm bowling (plus one catch) in a drawn match, and against Harrow Town on 4 July 1871 when he claimed six wickets in Harrow Town's second innings.

He made two first class appearances for M.C.C. in 1872 and 1873 as well as an appearance for the North of England against the South. He made several other appearances for the M.C.C. as well as playing for the Old Harrovians, the Army and I Zingari, for whom he scored his only recorded century in a match against Household Brigade on 18 July 1872; he scored 106 playing with a young George Harris, who scored 117. Harris was later to captain Kent and England.

== Military career ==
Copland-Crawford joined the 2nd Middlesex or Edmonton Royal Rifle Regiment of Militia and in September 1873 was appointed as a sub-lieutenant. The following January, he joined the 60th Rifles with the rank of sub-lieutenant and resigned his commission with the 2nd Middlesex Militia.

In January 1876, he was promoted to the full rank of lieutenant with the 60th Foot. He served in the Afghan War from 1878 to 1880, and was mentioned in dispatches for his involvement in the Battle of Ahmed Khel in April 1880. He also took part in the march to Kandahar under the overall command of Sir Frederick Roberts.

He resigned his commission on 6 August 1884.

== Sierra Leone ==
In mid-September 1888, he took up a six-month posting with the Sierra Leone Frontier Police, but ended his career in disgrace after he was sentenced to 12 months' imprisonment with hard labour for causing a native servant to be flogged to death.

Copland-Crawford was posted to the Sulymah district in the south-east of Sierra Leone, in an area described as "a narrow strip of coast in the south east of the colony, bounded by the territories of a number of independent native chieftains, who have never yet been considered subject to the British Crown". Shortly after his appointment, he made a visit to one of the local chiefs, Makaia (or Mackiah), at the town of Lago with instructions from the Governor of Sierra Leone, Sir James Hay to "enter into negotiations with a view to a peaceable settlement of disorders that had taken place on the frontier". Despite being hospitably received by Makaia, Copland-Crawford reported back "As your Excellency is well aware, the only way to renew trade, not 5 per cent, but 100 per cent, which means good for the Revenue as well as good for the merchants and traders, is to smash once and for all Mackiah, on one side, and Gumbo Saido . . . on the other". His report was not favourably received by Hay who wrote back "While I am pleased to note that your journey has not been attended by any untoward accident, I cannot but remark that it is one which should not have been undertaken without specific instructions from the officer administering the Government, the more so as, at present, the relations between Mackiah and this Government are such that the future policy in dealing with him is one which requires much consideration".

Despite this warning, Copland-Crawford then embarked on a further visit, this time to another chief, Fahwoondoo. When Fahwoondoo declined a request to attend a meeting with Copland-Crawford, Copland-Crawford ordered his arrest. In the resulting fight, ten of Fahwoondoo's men were killed and three constables injured; Fahwoondoo was taken to Sulymah where he was imprisoned. Governor Hay again expressed his displeasure: "Apart from the fact that your action may create complications, it is at all times, and more so at present, unadvisable to arouse the hostility of the people with whom the police come in constant contact, as it may have a tendency to render their services as messengers, as heretofore, of little or no use to us when once distrust has been created. I remark, that you say in your Report that you issued a warrant to make this arrest; this, I need hardly inform you, was invalid, and should not again be resorted to".

On 12 December, Copland-Crawford captured the town of Jehoma, killing 131 of Makaia's "warboys" with one policeman receiving serious injuries; this was again without authority from Governor Hay. Copland-Crawford was yet again rebuked by Hay: "I have once more to point out that in so doing you have exceeded your instructions; you have no authority from this Government to assume the offensive by attacking towns".

Copland-Crawford's actions eventually came to the attention of Parliament in London and, on 2 June 1890, were the subject of a heated debate with James Picton M.P. and others criticising his actions and the failure of Governor Hay to restrain him, while Baron Henry de Worms, Under-Secretary of State for the Colonies endeavoured to defend Hay in particular.

In April 1889, Copland-Crawford was arrested on a charge of causing a native servant to be flogged to death, his object being to extort a confession of crime. In July, he was tried at Freetown and found guilty; he was sentenced to 12 months imprisonment with hard labour. By this time, his health was not good and the authorities decided to send him back to England. He was shipped back from Freeport to Liverpool on board the S.S. Lagos in August. On his arrival at Liverpool he was examined by two doctors who reported that Copland-Crawford was suffering from the following conditions:

Absence of reflex action at left knee, slightly present in right knee; impaired sensibility of left foot and leg up to knee; inability to clench the hands tightly; unsteadiness of gait; œdema of both ankles and feet; enlargement of abdomen (evidently from fluid) with increased size of liver and spleen; excited action of heart; marked mental excitement; slight hesitancy in speech.

As a result it was decided that Copland-Crawford was unfit to be imprisoned and the remainder of his sentence was remitted.

He died on 23 May 1894.
