= Charles W. Alcock =

Cricketer and football administrator

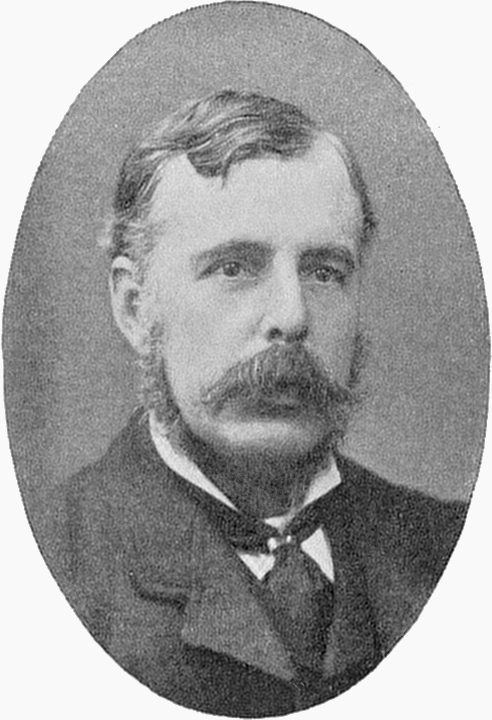

Personal information
- Full name: Charles William Alcock
- Date of birth: 2 December 1842
- Place of birth: Sunderland, England
- Date of death: 26 February 1907 (aged 64)
- Place of death: Brighton, Sussex, England
- Position: Centre forward

Senior career*
Years	Team	Apps	(Gls)
1862–1876	Forest/Wanderers		
- Harrow Pilgrims
- Upton Park
- Crystal Palace

International career
1870–1875	England	5	(1)
- * Club domestic league appearances and goals

Charles William Alcock (2 December 1842 – 26 February 1907) was an English sportsman, administrator, author and editor. He was a major instigator in the development of both international football and cricket, as well as being the creator of the FA Cup.

== Early life and career ==
Alcock was born in Sunderland on 2 December 1842, the second son of the elder Charles Alcock, a ship builder and owner, and his wife Elizabeth.

From 1853 to 1859, Alcock attended Harrow School. By the time young Charles left Harrow, his family had moved from Sunderland to Chingford, Essex. Charles senior subsequently established a marine insurance business in the City of London.

== Footballer ==
=== Forest/Wanderers ===
In 1859, Charles, along with his elder brother John Forster Alcock, was a founder of Forest Football Club, based in Leytonstone, Essex. As Charles Alcock would later write:

Just at that time [1859] a happy thought occurred to two or three old Harrovians located in the north-east suburbs of London ... to carry on the game of football which they had just had to give up on leaving school.

In March 1862, both brothers played for Forest in a home 1–0 victory over Crystal Palace FC.

Charles was a prime mover in the 1863 foundation of Forest's more famous successor, Wanderers F.C., who were initially a predominantly Old Harrovian side. Alcock captained Wanderers to triumph in the very first FA Cup final, in 1872. During this match, he put the ball in the opponents' goal, but the score was disallowed because of an earlier handball.

For their influence on the game of football the Wanderers were considered as early as 1870 to be the Marylebone Cricket Club (MCC) of football.

Alcock also turned out for Upton Park during his career and the first Crystal Palace.

=== England ===
Alcock captained the England team in all five of the England v Scotland matches from 1870 to 1872, which are not now recognized as full internationals because the "Scotland" team contained only London-based players.

On 6 March 1875, he captained England in a full international against Scotland, scoring a goal in a 2–2 draw.

=== Other matches ===
Alcock represented the "London" (FA) team in the London v Sheffield match of 1866, scoring a goal that was disallowed for offside.

=== Playing style ===
Alcock was a proponent and pioneer of modern football playing styles that employed teamwork and passing. As early as 1870 Alcock was the first to recognise the benefit of playing football in a "scientific" way. Alcock himself was one of the earliest football players to be described in contemporary reports as showing teamwork between players, for example in the 1871 England versus Scotland international:

"indeed it seemed as if the [Scottish] defence would prove more than equal to the attack until a well executed run down by C W Alcock WC Butler and RSF Walker, acting in concert, enabled the last named of the trio to equalise the score by the accomplishment of a well merited goal"

In 1874 Alcock was the first to advocate the predecessor of the modern passing style known as the "Combination game": "Nothing succeeds better than what I may call a 'combination game'" He attributed to Sheffield FC the beginning of the modern passing game. In a discussion on the history of a "definite scheme of attack" and "elaborate combination" in football playing style, Alcock noted (in 1891): "The perfection of the system which is in vogue at the present time however is in a very great measure the creation of the last few years. The Cambridge University eleven of 1883 were the first to illustrate the full possibilities of a systematic combination giving full scope to the defence as well as the attack"

== Football administrator ==
Forest FC was one of the founding clubs of the Football Association (FA), the club being represented in the first 1863 meetings by Charles's elder brother John (as club captain) and A. W. Mackenzie (as club secretary). John Alcock was elected to the FA's committee in December 1863, serving until February 1866, when he was replaced by Charles.

=== FA committee member (1866–1870) ===
At the FA's annual meeting in February 1867, Charles Alcock expressed the view that "a little more energy was required to establish the game on a sure footing", and suggested an extraordinary meeting of the association ought to be held during the Christmas holidays with a view to increasing the acceptance of the FA's rules by schools and universities. He also argued successfully for the law-change proposed by Wanderers FC to eliminate the "touch down" tie-breaker from the FA laws, and against several alterations suggested by Sheffield FC that would have introduced features from Sheffield rules football into the FA code, saying that his proposed changes would be "the only step to inducing the public schools to join" the association.

In October 1867, Alcock was given the responsibility for selecting the "Middlesex" players for the inaugural county match between Middlesex and a "Surrey and Kent XI".

=== FA secretary (1870–1895) ===
In 1870, Alcock was elected honorary secretary and treasurer of the FA, replacing Robert Graham in both roles. He served as secretary for 25 years (unpaid until 1887). His unprecedently long tenure encompassed the establishment of international matches, the introduction of the FA Cup, the unification of Sheffield rules football with association football, and the introduction of professionalism.

==== First international match ====
Alcock was one of those responsible for the first ever international soccer match (and subsequent early international games) with Scotland. The first two of these took place in 1870, with later matches in 1871 and 1872. After the 1870 games there was resentment in Scotland that their team did not contain more home grown players and some of this fire was aimed at Alcock. Alcock himself was categorical about the international standing of the 1870 games and where he felt responsibility lay for the inclusion of so many England-based players in the Scotland team, writing in the Scotsman newspaper:

"I must join issue with your correspondent in some instances. First, I assert that of whatever the Scotch eleven may have been composed the right to play was open to every Scotchman [Alcock's italics] whether his lines were cast North or South of the Tweed and that if in the face of the invitations publicly given through the columns of leading journals of Scotland the representative eleven consisted chiefly of Anglo-Scotians ... the fault lies on the heads of the players of the north, not on the management who sought the services of all alike impartially. To call the team London Scotchmen contributes nothing. The match was, as announced, to all intents and purposes between England and Scotland".

Alcock then proceeded to offer further challenges with a Scottish team drawn from Scotland and proposed the north of England as a compromise venue to take into account travelling distances. Although not currently recognised by FIFA as official, the Scotsman newspaper described the 1870 and 1871 games as "international" and in italics. One reason for the absence of a response to Alcock's early challenges may have been different football codes being followed in Scotland at the time. A written reply to Alcock's letter above states: "Mr Alcock's challenge to meet a Scotch eleven on the borders sounds very well and is doubtless well meant. But it may not be generally well known that Mr Alcock is a very leading supporter of what is called the "association game"... devotees of the "association" rules will find no foemen worthy of their steel in Scotland". Alcock appeared to be particularly concerned about the number of players in Scottish football teams at the time, adding: "More than eleven we do not care to play as it is with greater numbers it is our opinion the game becomes less scientific and more a trial of charging and brute force... Charles W Alcock, Hon Sec of Football Association and Captain of English Eleven".

In 1872 Alcock's was behind the statement that 'To further the interests of the Association in Scotland, it was decided that during the current season, a team should be sent to Glasgow to play a match v Scotland' in the FA's minutes of 3 October 1872. The 1872 international match took place between England and Scotland on 30 November, with Alcock ruled out of the England side which drew 0–0 at the West of Scotland Cricket Ground in Partick through injury sustained two weeks earlier, playing for Old Harrovians against Old Etonians. Instead he represented his country as umpire, with the England captaincy awarded to Cuthbert Ottaway.

==== FA Cup ====
On 20 July 1871, Alcock, in his position as FA Secretary, proposed 'That it is desirable that a Challenge Cup should be established in connection with the Association, for which all clubs belonging to the Association should be invited to compete'. Thus, the FA Cup – the world's first national football tournament, based on Alcock's experience of inter-house 'sudden death' competition at Harrow – was born. Fifteen teams took part in the first competition in 1872, with Alcock captaining the winning Wanderers side. The final was played at The Oval, the home ground of Surrey County Cricket Club, of which Alcock had become Secretary of the previous month.

==== Professionalism ====
As Secretary of the Football Association, Alcock played a leading role in the debate over professionalism in the 1880s. Following a controversy over the expulsion of Preston North End from the 1883–84 FA Cup over alleged financial inducements to Scottish players, Alcock worked to introduce a regulated professionalism into the game. He was influenced by the model of professionalism that had already been introduced in cricket, with which he was familiar as a result of his role as Secretary of Surrey Cricket Club.

=== Referee ===
Alcock refereed the 1875 and 1879 FA Cup Finals.

== Cricket ==
In cricket, Alcock captained Middlesex in the first county match in 1867, before playing for Essex. He played only one first-class fixture, for Marylebone Cricket Club (MCC), in 1862 (Essex was not yet a first-class county).

Between 1872 and 1907, Alcock served as secretary of Surrey. Repeating his interest in sporting internationals, he arranged the first cricket Test match to be played in England, England against Australia at the Kennington Oval in 1880

=== 1886 Trophy ===
Every year teams from the Parsee Gymkhana, Mumbai and the Charles Alcock XI play for the 1886 Trophy, to honour Alcock's contribution to the first tour of England by an Indian cricket team, made up solely of Parsee cricketers. The Charles Alcock XI is captained by the spin-bowling, Himalayan explorer Matt Greenwell. Greenwell established the 1886 Trophy along with friends Berjes Shroff and Parsee gymkhana legend Khodadad Yazdegardi.

== Author ==
Throughout the majority of his career, Alcock supported his family with his work as an author and editor of books and periodicals.

=== Newspapers ===
Alcock started work at the recently launched The Sportsman in the late 1860s, becoming the athletics, football and cricket sub-editor of that journal by 1867. In 1882, Alcock launched: Cricket: A Weekly Record of the Game, a successful newspaper which ran until 1913. He also produced a parallel magazine about football: Football, co-edited by Nicholas Lane Jackson; this venture was less successful, within six months being renamed Pastime: the Lawn-Tennis Journal, with Jackson as sole editor.

=== Annuals ===
Alcock founded and edited the Football Annual from 1867 until his death; he also founded and edited James Lillywhite's Cricketers' Annual from 1872 to 1900.

== Death ==
Charles Alcock is buried in West Norwood Cemetery in south London, England.

== Publications ==
=== Football Annual ===
- Alcock, Charles W., ed. (1868). John Lillywhite's Football Annual. London: John Lillywhite.
- Alcock, Charles W., ed. (1869). Football Annual. London: Sportsman.
- Alcock, Charles W., ed. (1870). Football Annual. London: Sportsman.
- Alcock, Charles W., ed. (1871). Football Annual. London: Virtue.
- Alcock, Charles W., ed. (1872). Football Annual. London: Virtue.
- Alcock, Charles W., ed. (1873). Football Annual. London: Virtue.
- Alcock, Charles W., ed. (1874). Football Annual. London: Virtue.
- Alcock, Charles W., ed. (1875). Football Annual. London: Virtue.
- Alcock, Charles W., ed. (1876). Football Annual. London: Ward, Lock, & Tyler.
- Alcock, Charles W., ed. (1877). Football Annual. London.
- Alcock, Charles W., ed. (1878). Football Annual. London: Cricket Press.
- Alcock, Charles W., ed. (1879). Football Annual. London: Cricket Press.
- Alcock, Charles W., ed. (1880). Football Annual. London: Cricket Press.
- Alcock, Charles W., ed. (1881). Football Annual.
- Alcock, Charles W., ed. (1882). Football Annual. London: Cricket Press.
- Alcock, Charles W., ed. (1883). Football Annual. London: Wright & Co.
- Alcock, Charles W., ed. (1884). Football Annual. London: Wright & Co.
- Alcock, Charles W., ed. (1886). Football Annual. London: Wright & Co.
- Alcock, Charles W., ed. (1887). Football Annual. London: Cricket Press.
- Alcock, Charles W., ed. (1892). Football Annual. London: Wright & Co.
- Alcock, Charles W., ed. (1897). Football Annual. London: Merritt & Hatcher.
- Alcock, Charles W., ed. (1898). Football Annual. London: Merritt & Hatcher.
- Alcock, Charles W., ed. (1899). Football Annual. London: Merritt & Hatcher.
- Alcock, Charles W., ed. (1900). Football Annual. London: Merritt & Hatcher.
- Alcock, Charles W., ed. (1901). Football Annual. London: Merritt & Hatcher.
- Alcock, Charles W., ed. (1902). Football Annual. London: Merritt & Hatcher.
- Alcock, Charles W., ed. (1903). Football Annual.
- Alcock, Charles W., ed. (1904). Football Annual. London: Merritt & Hatcher.
- Alcock, Charles W., ed. (1905). Football Annual. London: Merritt & Hatcher.
- Alcock, Charles W., ed. (1906). Football Annual. London: Merritt & Hatcher.

=== Cricket Calendar ===
- Alcock, C. W., ed. (1872). Cricket Calendar for 1872. London.
- Alcock, C. W., ed. (1875). Cricket Calendar for 1875. London: Virtue.
- Alcock, C. W., ed. (1879). Cricket Calendar for 1879. London.

=== Other publications ===
- Alcock, Charles W., ed. (1871). The Book of Rules of the Game of Foot Ball. New York: Peck & Snyder.
- Alcock, Charles W., ed. (1872). John Lillywhite's Cricketer's Annual. London: John Lillywhite.
- Alcock, Charles W. (n.d.) [1874]. Football: Our Winter Game. London: Field Office.
- Alcock, C. W., ed. (1875). Sportsman's Almanack. London.
- Alcock, C. W.; Jackson, N L (1881). The national football calendar for 1881. London: Cricket Press.
- Irvine, Dr.; Alcock, C. W. (1887). Football: a Popular Handbook of the Game. London: Religious Tract Society.
- Alcock, C.W. (1890). Football: The Association Game. London: George Bell & Sons.
  - included in Bell, Ernest, ed. (1892). Handbook of Athletic Sports. Vol. iv. London: George Bell & Sons.
  - Revised edition, with illustrations (1897)
  - "New edition" (1906)
- Alcock, C.W. (1895). Famous Cricketers and Cricket Grounds: 1895. London: Hudson & Kearns.
- Alcock, C.W; Webster, Richard Everard (c. 1897). Famous Footballers: 1895-1896. London: Hudson & Kearns.
- Alcock, C.W. (1900). Management of a Club.
- Alcock, C.W. (1901). Cricket Stories: Wise and Otherwise. Bristol.
- Webster, Richard Everard; Alcock, C.W (1902). Surrey Cricket: its History and Associations. London: Longmans.

== Bibliography ==
- Booth, Keith. The Father of Modern Sport: The Life and Times of Charles W. Alcock, Parrs Wood Press. 2002. ISBN 1-903158-34-6
