= List of Barnes F.C. seasons =

== Seasons ==
- 1862–63 Barnes F.C. season
- 1863–64 Barnes F.C. season
- 1864–65 Barnes F.C. season
- 1865–66 Barnes F.C. season
- 1866–67 Barnes F.C. season
- 1867–68 Barnes F.C. season
- 1868–69 Barnes F.C. season
- 1869–70 Barnes F.C. season
- 1870–71 Barnes F.C. season
- 1871–72 Barnes F.C. season
- 1872–73 Barnes F.C. season
- 1873–74 Barnes F.C. season
