= 1867–68 Barnes F.C. season =

Barnes
1867-68 season
- Captain: Robert Willis
- Secretary: Robert Graham
- Rules: Laws of the Game (1867)

This was the sixth season of Barnes Football Club.

19 October 1867	Barnes	1-0	C.C.C.	Barnes
	Nettleship
Note: Barnes (15 players): J. K. Barnes, C. Boyle, W. Collins, R. Courtenay, A. Dunnage, R. G. Graham, L. Karslake, Luff, E. C. Morley, J. Mossendew, W. Nettleship, Poupard, M. Roberts, S. Le B. Smith, Warren. C.C.C. (14 players): Davison, Dealtry, Dewthey, Eliot, Field, Gordon, Hewitson, B. Ker, J. C. Ker, Porter, Turner, Taylor, Townsend, Urlwin

26 October 1867	Barnes	0-0	Worlabye House	Barnes
	Nettleship
Note: According to the report, this was an annual fixture that had also been played in previous years. It appears that a Reverend Thomas J. Baty resided at Worlabye House, Roehampton; and thus "Worlabye House" may well represent the same team as "Students of the Rev. Mr Inchbold and the Rev. Mr Baty" (faced in the 1863-64 season) and "Rev. T. J. Batey's Pupils" (from the 1866-67 season). Barnes (12 players): R. Willis, Barnes, Collins, Courtenay, A. Dunnage, Holt, Mossendew, Nettleship, Poupord, Rhodes, Roberts, S. Le B. Smith. Worlabye House (12 players): Antrobus, C. Boyle, Coryton, J. Dunbar, E. Gaskell, J. Grant, Hon. G. Montgomery, F. Stephenson, Verelat, Hon. R. F. Villiers, E. Witt, J. Witt.

9 November 1867	N.N.	1-0	Barnes	Kilburn
	Alfred Baker
Note: Game ended at 16:45. N.N. (15 players): S. T. Holland (capt.), A. Baker, W. F. Baker, A. Bird, W. Bird, Borrodale, Collins, A. Fleet, H. N. B. Good, Green, C. Morrice, Dr Morton, J. Nicholas, A. J. Schwabe, J. Sharp. Barnes (12 players): R. W. Willis (capt.), Adams, Barnes, W. R. Collins, P. Evetts, R. G. Graham, A. Holt, L. Karslake, E. C. Morley, Mortimer, J. Mossenden, S. Le B. Smith.

16 November 1867	Barnes	0-0	Royal Engineers	Barnes
15:30
Note: Game finished at 17:00. Barnes (14 players): R. W. Willis (capt.), Adams, Antrobus, J. K. Barnes, G. de Castro, W. R. Collins, R. G. Graham, Lieut. G. H. Marshall, J. Mossendew, P. Pointer, Poupard, P. Rhodes, S. Le B. Smith, C. H. Warren. Royal Engineers (15 players): Lieut. W. Merriman (capt.), Lieut. R. Athorpe, Lieut. C. F. C. Beresford, J. E. Broadbent, Lieut. J. Brown, Lieut. D. M. N. Campbell, Lieut. D. C. Courtney, A. O. Green, Lieut. H. S. F. Haynes, W. G. Morris, J. C. Pottinger, Lieut. R. R. Pulford, Lieut. M. H. Purcell, Lieut. E. Stephens, Lieut. F. P. Washington.

30 November 1867	C.C.C.	1-0	Barnes	Clapham Common
	Fanshawe
Note: C.C.C. (11 players): C. C. Dacre, C. Davison, H. Dealtry, Elliot, Fanshawe, A. French, F. Harting, D. M. Roberts, F. B. Soden, J. E. Taylor, P. O. Turner, J. Urlwin. Barnes (11 players): R. W. Willis (capt.), H. Adams, J. K. Barnes, Carr, W. R. Collins, R. G. Graham, H. G. Marshall, S. Le B. Smith, E. Weston, A. Wooton.

18 January 1868	Crystal Palace	v	Barnes	Crystal Palace
Note: Match scheduled, but no report was found.

22 February 1868	Royal Engineers	2-0	Barnes	Chatham
15:45	Green (30); Unknown			Stadium: "Outer Lines"
Note: Game was scheduled to end at 17:00, but "by general consent" was continued until 17:30. Royal Engineers (14 players): Pottinger (capt.), Barlow, Browne, Campbell, Chambers, Courtney, Fanshaw, Fellowes, Green, Johnstone, Morgan, Morris, Pulford, Purcell. Barnes (14 players): R. W. Willis (capt.), J. K. Barnes, Broadbent, H. Butler, J. Cockerell, W. G. Collins, R. G. Graham, W. F. Nettlesmith, P. Rhodes, D. M. Roberts, C. Routh, W. Wootton, C. Warren.

29 February 1868	Barnes	0-0	Crystal Palace	Barnes
Note: Barnes (11 players): R. W. Willis (capt.), Adams, Antrobus, J. K. Barnes, W. Butler, Foster, W. Nettleship, D. M. Roberts, C. Routh, S. L. B. Smith, C. Warren. Crystal Palace (10 players): D. Allport, A. C. Chamberlain, J. Cockerell, A. L. Cutbill, R. Cutbill, H. Lloyd, A. Lloyd, A. Morten, A. Saward, J. Sharland.

== Athletic Sports ==
- Date: 28 March 1868
- Venue: Field belonging to J. Johnstone, The White Hart, Mortlake.
- Committee: A. D. Houseman (starter), F. W. Bryant, R. W. Willis (judges), R. G. Graham (secretary, clerk of course).
- Events: 100 yards race, three-quarters of a mile handicap, 440 yards handicap, 220 yards hurdle race, one mile handicap steeplechase, high jump, high jump with pole, long jump
