= 1865–66 Barnes F.C. season =

Barnes
1865-65 season
- Captain: Ebenezer Morley
- Secretary: Robert Willis
- Rules: Laws of the Game (1863); Laws of the Game (1866) (after 22 February 1866).
Home colours

This was the fourth season of Barnes Football Club.

4 November 1865	Barnes	W-L	Civil Service	Barnes
Note:

11 November 1865	Barnes	W-L	C.C.C.	Barnes
Note:

2 December 1865	Crystal Palace	0-0	Barnes	Penge
15:15
Note: Match was "nominally fifteen-a-side", but Barnes had 9 men (absentees included the captain Ebenezer Morley): Crystal Palace had 14. Game lasted one hour. Barnes (9 players): Barnes, Graham, Roberts, Le B. Smith, et al.

20 January 1866	Barnes	0-2	Civil Service	Barnes
			O. N. Fuller, F. Deacon
Note: The Civil Service team "could muster only eight men, and were obliged to fill up the vacancies with members of other well-known clubs". Barnes (15 players): Barnes, C. Bagot, Courtenay, Drake, R. Graham, Greenhill, Karslake, H. P. Mackrell, Montgomery, W. Nettleship, M. Roberts, Sheppard, Le B. Smith, Tebbs, R. Willis. Civil Service (14 players): C. W. Alcock, A. E. Bateman, G. B. Blount, F. Deacon, R. D. Elphinstone, O. U. Fuller, Q. Hogg, J. Kirkpatrick, Rose, Seppings, A. H. Turner, X. Turner, C. G. Wandby, J. Wearne.

3 February 1866	Barnes	W-L	Crystal Palace	Barnes
Note: "Only a very small number of the representatives of Crystal Palace showed up".

10 March 1866	Barnes	0 (2) - 0 (1)	Crystal Palace	Barnes
15:45	Barnes, Villiers (touches down)		Unknown (touch down)	Attendance: "Numerous bystanders"
Note: Game ended at 5 o'clock after 1 and a quarter hours' play. Barnes (14 players): E. C. Morley (captain), R. Bamburry, T. K. Barnes, Boyle, R. Carrington, Farquharson, R. Graham, Hudson, D. M. O'Leary, M. Roberts, R. Shepard, S. L. B. Smith, R. Villiers, R. Willis. Crystal Palace (15 players): A. Morton (capt.), E. Abraham, D. Allport, W. Allport, Cockerell, A. Cutbill, E. Cutbill, H. Foster, Grose, E. K. Hammond, A. Lloyd, H. Lloyd, T. Lloyd, Saward, T. Sharland.

== Athletic Sports ==
- Date: 24 March 1866
- Venue: The Limes, Mortlake. (Field belonging to T. Marsh Nelson, to the back of the White Hart public house).
- Committee: Ebenezer Morley (starter), H. H. Playford (judge), E. Conant, R. G. Graham, R. Wright, G. Villiers
- Secretary: Robert Willis
- Events: 100 yards race, 300 yards race, one mile handicap, 220 yards hurdle race, one mile steeple chase, long jump, high jump with pole.
