= 1869–70 Barnes F.C. season =

Barnes
1869-70 season
- Captain: Robert Willis
- Secretary: James Powell
- Rules: Laws of the Game (1869); Laws of the Game (1870) (after 23 February 1870)
Home colours

This was the eighth season of Barnes Football Club.

30 October 1869	Barnes	1-0	N.N.	Barnes
15:40	Butler (~15)
Note: The N.N. captain, Tebbutt, "failed them at the last moment", leaving the team one man down. Barnes (11 players): R. N. Willis (capt.), W. Butler, H. Ellis, J. Graham, H. Hackblock, F. Ommanney, P. Rhodes, D. M. Roberts, C. Routh, E. Weston, P. Weston. N.N. (10 players): J. Nicholas (capt.), A. Fleet, J. J. Fletcher, L. Howell, C. Morice, A. C. Nicoll, H. Rushworth, A. J. Schwabe, J. Somervail, T. L. Sweeting.

6 November 1869	Barnes	v	Gitanos	Barnes
Note: Match scheduled, but no report was found.

20 November 1869	Barnes	0-0	Worlabye House	Barnes
Note: "Worlabytes had to kick it off [i.e. take a goal-kick] at least a dozen times". Barnes (11 players): R. W. Willis (capt.), W. Butler, H. Collins, R. W. Collins, J. Graham, H. Hackblock, F. G. Ommanney, C. Routh, C. Warren, E. Weston, P. Weston. Worlabye House (11 players): F. Coryton (capt.), Lord W. Beresford, Blair, Ellis, Elwin, Lord Ossulston, Rhodes, Riversdale, Villiers, Williams, Witt.

27 November 1869	Barnes	v	C.C.C.	Barnes
Note: Match scheduled, but no report was found.

4 December 1869	Barnes	0-0	Royal Engineers	Barnes
Note: Match scheduled, but no report was found.

18 December 1869	Barnes	0-0	Crystal Palace	Barnes
15:15
Note: Match ended at 16:15. '"Slogger" Morley seems to have retired from the game which he so long and so well directed'. Barnes (11 players): R. W. Willis (capt.), Butler, Collins, Dunnage, Graham, Ommaney, Roberts, Routh, Warren, E. Weston, P. Weston; Crystal Palace (11 players): D. Allport (capt.), H. F. Abell, W. M. Allport, R. W. Clutton, C. C. Harvey, R. K. Kingsford, A. Lloyd, T. Lloyd, A. Morten, W. F. Parr, J. Turner.

15 January 1870	C.C.C.	v	Barnes	Clapham
Note: Match scheduled, but no report was found.

22 January 1870	Barnes	1-0	N.N.	Barnes
	Routh
Note: Barnes (12 players): W. Butler (capt.), G. W. Chapman, H. Collins, V. W. Collins, F. Ellis, C. Gilmore, J. Graham, F. Peel, P. Rhodes, C. Routh, C. H. Warren, P. Weston; N.N. (12 players): C. M. Tebbut (capt.), W. Clarke, H. Emanuel, A. Fleet, W. Fletcher, A. Fuller, C. J. Morice, C. Peake, W. Peake, H. Rushworth, C. Sweeting, R. Wilkie.

12 February 1870	Crystal Palace	v	Barnes	Crystal Palace
Note: Match scheduled, but no report was found.

26 February 1870	Royal Engineers	v	Barnes	Chatham
Note: Match scheduled, but no report was found.

12 March 1870	Barnes	v	Worlabye House	Barnes
Note: Match scheduled, but no report was found.

== Athletic Sports ==
- Date: 26 March 1870
- Venue: "Football Field", belonging to J. Johnstone, White Hart Inn, Mortlake.
- Committee: W. M. Chinnery (starter), F. W. Bryant, R. W. Willis (judges), W. M. Chinnery and E. C. Morley (umpires)
- Events: 100 yards flat race, 400 yards flat race handicap, half-mile handicap, 150 yards hurdle, one mile handicap steeplechase, two miles handicap walking, high jump, high jump with pole, vaulting
