= Free kick (association football) =

Method of restarting play in association football

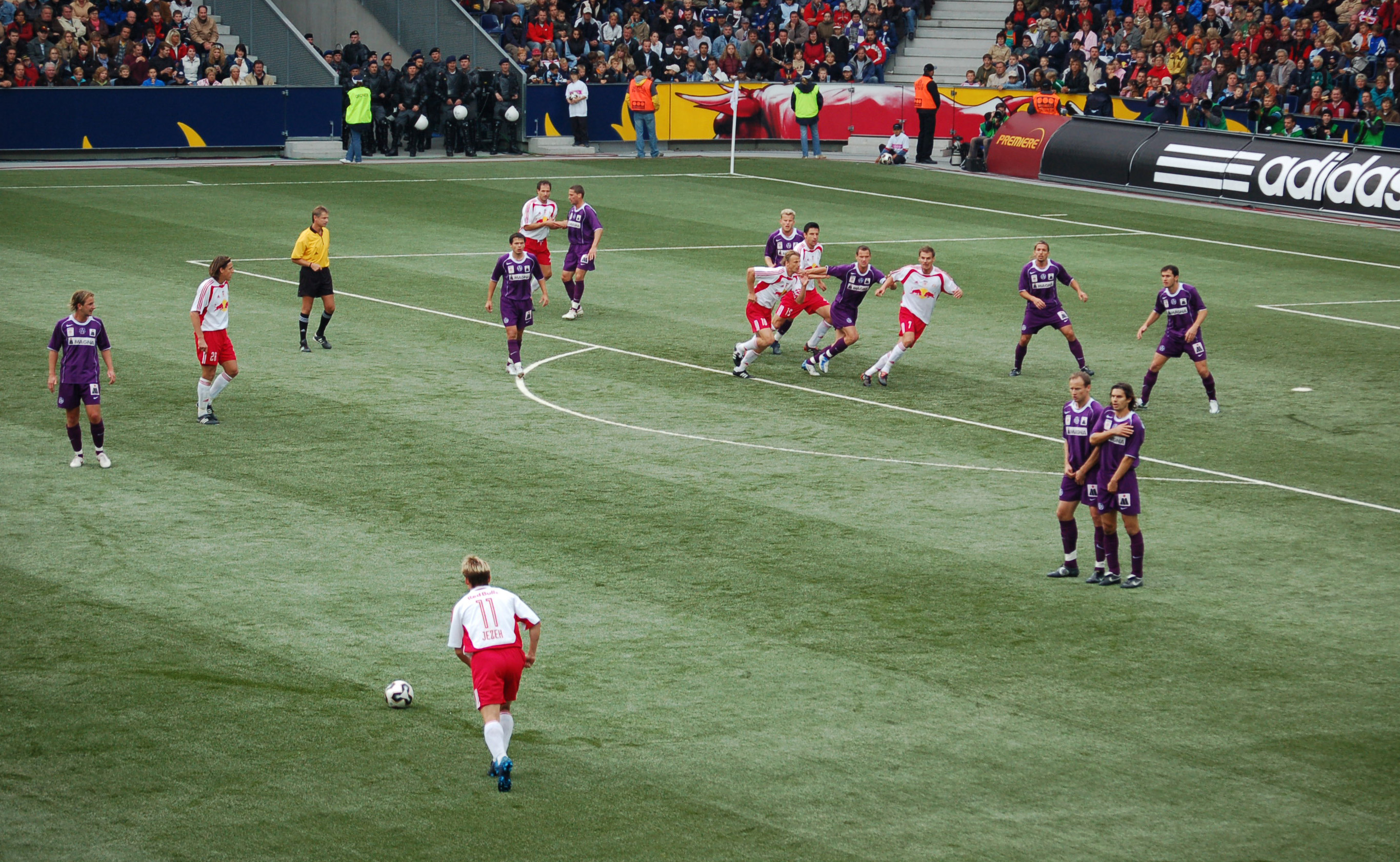
A direct free kick being taken by RB Salzburg

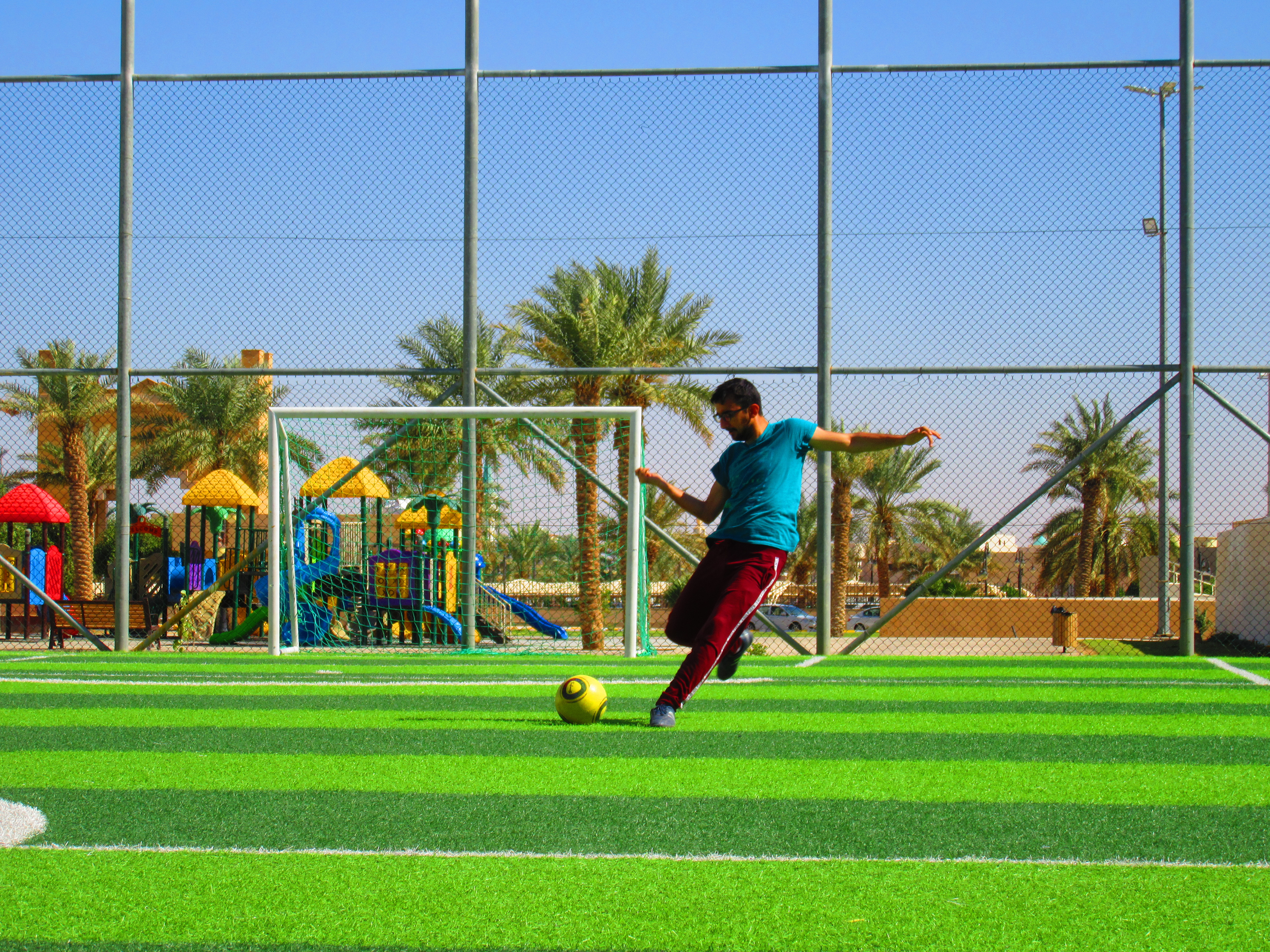
Freekick imitation

A direct free kick scored by FC Versailles

A free kick is a method of restarting play in association football. It is awarded after an infringement of the laws by the opposing team.

== Direct and indirect free kicks ==
Free kicks may be either direct or indirect, distinguished as follows:

- An attacking goal may be scored directly from a direct free kick, but not from an indirect free kick (i.e., the ball must touch another player first).
- Direct free kicks are awarded for more serious offences (handball and most types of foul play – see below for a complete list), while indirect free kicks are awarded for less serious offences.
- A direct free kick cannot be awarded in the offending team's penalty area: if a team in its own penalty area commits an offence normally punished by a direct free kick, a penalty kick is awarded instead. An indirect free kick may be awarded for an offence committed anywhere.

== Procedure ==
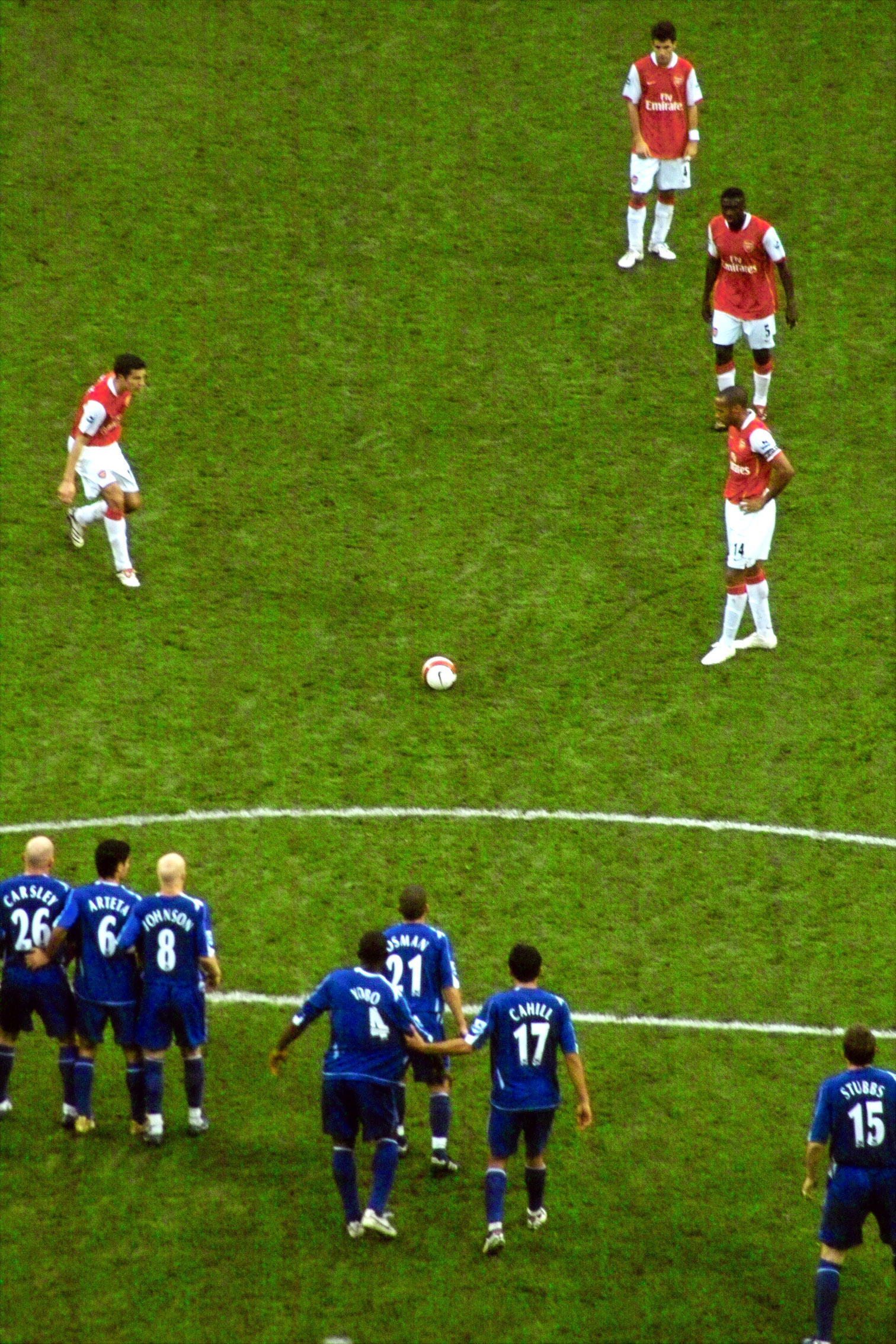
Often several players (red) will line up for a free kick, so as to mask their intentions to the defending team (blue).

=== Signal ===
The referee signals an indirect free kick by raising the arm vertically above the head; a direct free kick is signalled by extending the arm horizontally. A mnemonic is that the referee's raised arm resembles the letter "I", for "indirect".

=== Location ===
The free kick is taken from the place where the infringement occurred, with the following exceptions:

- if the offence was within the kicking team's own goal area, the free kick may be taken from anywhere within the goal area.
- if an indirect free kick is awarded for an offence within the offending team's own goal area, the kick is taken from the nearest point on the goal area line which runs parallel to the goal line.
- if the offence took place outside the field of play, the free kick is taken from the boundary line nearest to where the offence occurred.
- for certain technical offences (a substitute starts a match without the referee being informed; a player or team official enters the playing area without the referee's permission but without interfering with the game) play is started with an indirect free kick from the place where the ball was when play stopped.

=== Kick ===
The ball must be stationary and on the ground. Opponents must be at least 9.15 m (10 yards) from the ball until it is in play, unless they are on their own goal-line between the goal-posts. If the free kick is taken from within the kicking team's penalty area, opponents must be outside the penalty area.

If the defending team forms a "wall" of three or more players, all attacking players must be at least 1 m (1 yard) from the wall until the ball is in play.

The ball becomes in play as soon as it is kicked and clearly moves. The ball must be kicked (a goalkeeper may not pick up the ball). A free kick can be taken by lifting the ball with a foot or both feet simultaneously. It is legal to feint to take a free kick to confuse opponents. (This distinguishes the free kick from the penalty kick, where feinting is illegal once the run-up has been completed).

A player may be penalised for an offside offence from a free kick. This distinguishes the free kick from most other methods of restarting the game, from which it is not possible for a player to commit an offside offence.

=== Scoring a goal directly from a free kick ===
Ball goes directly into	Type of free kick	
Ball goes directly into	Direct	Indirect
Opponents' goal	Goal scored	Goal-kick to opponents
Own goal	Corner-kick to opponents	

A goal may be scored directly from a direct free kick against the opposing side. A goal may not be scored directly from an indirect free kick, and an own goal may not be scored directly from any free kick. If the ball goes directly into the opposing team's goal from an indirect free kick, a goal kick is awarded to the opposing team. If the ball goes directly into the kicking team's own goal, a corner kick is awarded to the opposing team.

When an indirect free kick has been awarded, the referee must maintain the vertically raised arm until the kick has been taken and the ball touches another player, goes out of play, or it is clear that a goal cannot be scored directly. If the referee fails to signal that the free kick is indirect, and the ball goes directly into the opponents' goal, the kick must be retaken.

== Infringements and sanctions ==
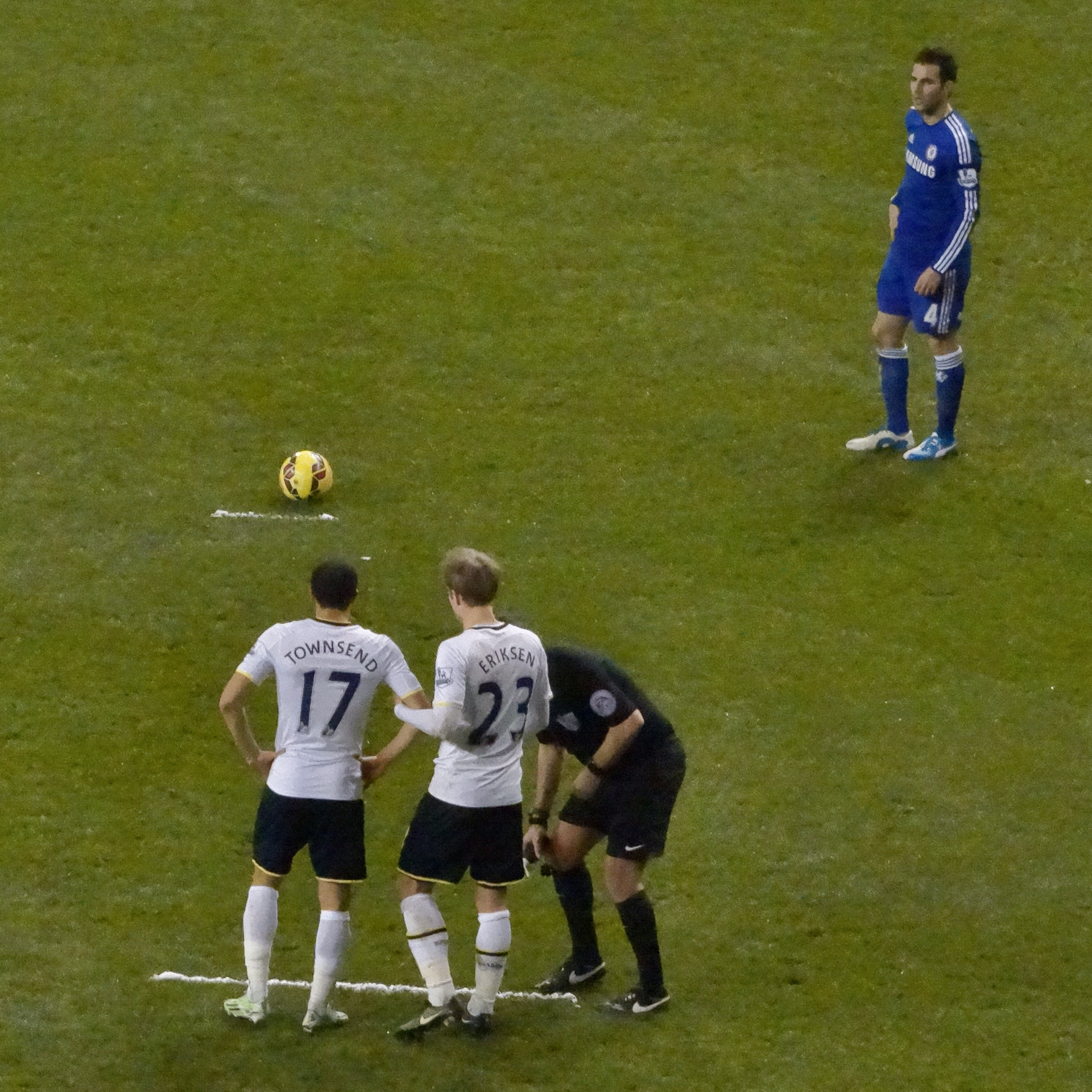
Vanishing spray has been utilised in recent years to indicate the minimum distance for free kicks.

If the ball is moving, or in the wrong place, the kick is retaken. A player who takes a free kick from the wrong position in order to force a retake, or who excessively delays the restart of play, is cautioned.

If an opponent is less than 9.15 m (10 yards) from the spot where the kick is taken, the kick is re-taken unless the kicking team chooses to take a "quick free kick" before opponents have been able to retreat the required distance. An opponent also may be cautioned (yellow card) for failing to retreat 9.15 m (10 yards), or for deliberately preventing a quick free kick from being taken.

If the kicker touches the ball a second time before it has touched another player, an indirect free kick is awarded to the opposing team, unless this second touch is an illegal handball offence, in which case a direct free kick or penalty kick is awarded.

If an attacking player stands within 1 m (1 yard) of a "wall" of 3 or more defending players, an indirect free kick is awarded to the opposing team.

== Quick free kick ==
A team may choose to take a "quick" free kick, that is, take the kick while opponents are within the 9.15-metre (10-yard) minimum required distance. This is usually done for some tactical reason, such as surprising the defence or taking advantage of their poor positioning. The referee has full discretion on whether to allow a quick free kick, and all other rules on free kicks still apply. However, in taking a quick free kick the kicking team waives their entitlement to retake the kick if an opponent who was within 9.15 m (10 yards) intercepts the ball. Football governing bodies may provide further instruction to referees on administering quick free kicks; for example, the United States Soccer Federation advises that referees should not allow a quick free kick if a card is shown prior to the restart, if a trainer has to enter the field to attend to an injured player, if the kicking team requests enforcement of the 10-yard (9.15 m) rule, or if the referee needs to slow the pace of the match (e.g., to talk to a player).

== Scoring opportunities ==
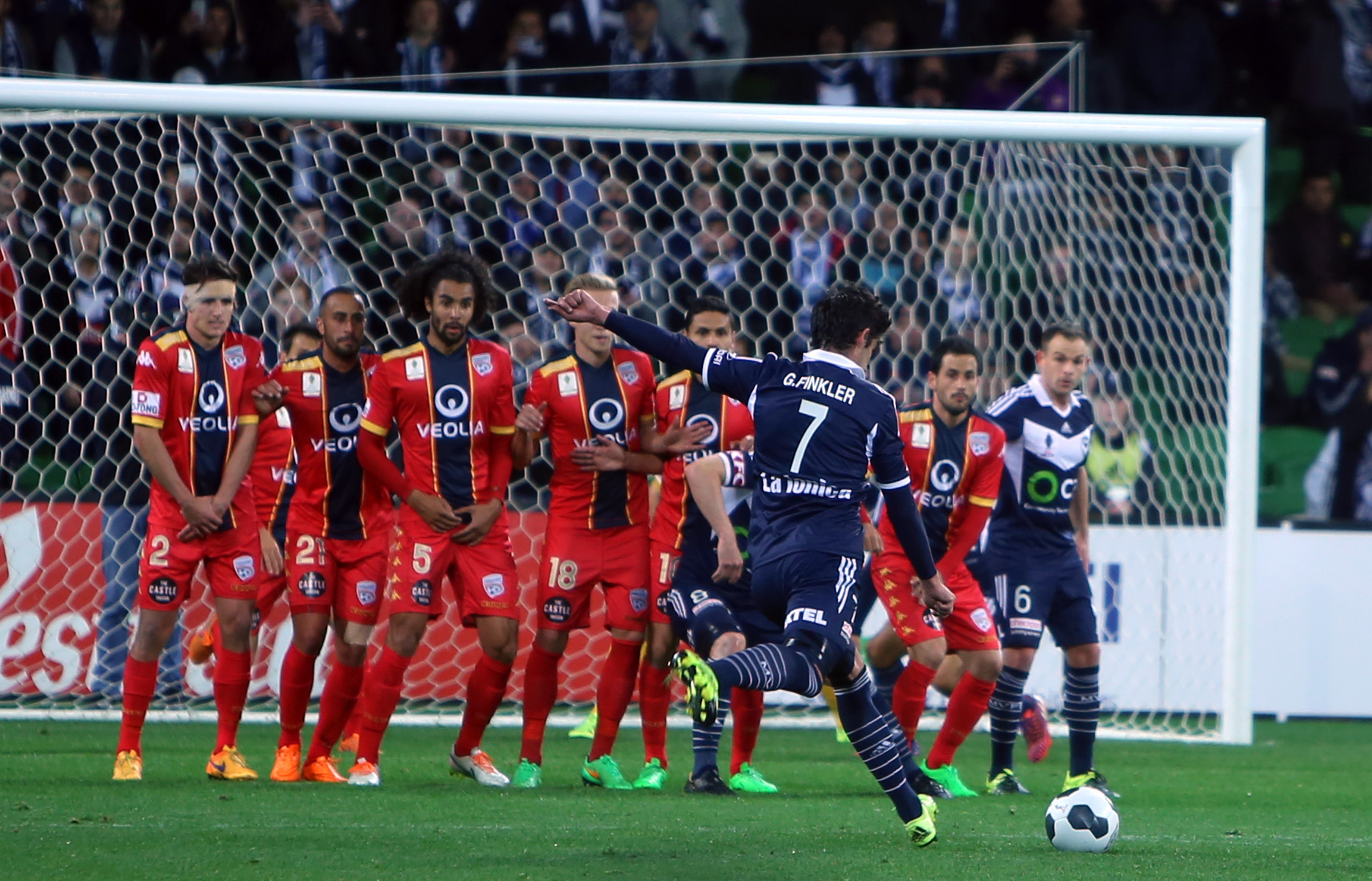
Guilherme Finkler (blue, no. 7) attempts to score from a direct free kick for Melbourne Victory FC

Direct free kicks awarded near the opponent's goal can often lead to scoring opportunities, either from the kick itself or from an ensuing set piece. Accordingly, developing plays from free kicks are an important part of team strategy, and defending against them is an important skill for defenders.

There are various techniques used with direct free kicks. The player taking the direct free kick may choose to strike the ball with as much force as possible, usually with the laces of the boot. Alternatively, players may attempt to curl the ball around the keeper or the wall, with the inside or outside the boot. Additionally, certain free kick specialists will choose to kick the ball with minimal spin, making the ball behave unpredictably in the air (similar to the action of a knuckleball pitch in baseball). The kicker may also attempt to drive the shot under the wall formed by the opposition defenders using the inside of their boot in a passing manner. Free kick takers may also attempt to cross the ball to their centre-backs or strikers to get a header on goal, since they usually are the tallest members of the team, especially if the position of the free kick is close to the wings.

== Strategy ==
A defending team (red) attempts to block the direct path to goal with a "wall" of players.

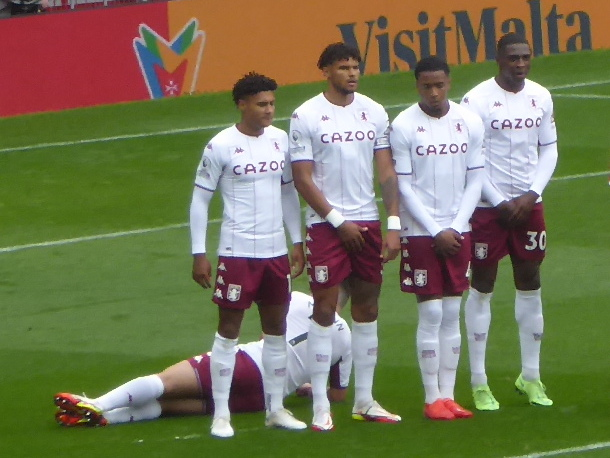
Aston Villa players have a man lying on the ground behind the wall to stop low free kicks

Most teams have one or two designated free kick takers, depending on the distance from goal and the side of the pitch from which the free kick is to be taken. The strategy may be to score a goal directly from the free kick, or to use the free kick as the beginning of a set piece leading towards a goal-scoring opportunity.

The kicking team may have more than one player line up behind the ball, run up to the ball, and/or feint a kick in order to confuse or deceive the defence as to their intentions; this is usually legal as long as no other infringements occur.

Where there is a potential for a shot on goal to occur from a direct free kick, often the defending side will erect a "wall" of players standing side by side as a barrier to the shot. The number of players composing the wall varies based on distance and strategy. The wall is typically positioned to screen the area of the near side post, while the far side post is normally referred to as the primary responsibility of the goalkeeper, which is why the goalkeeper is often positioned further towards the far side post than the near side post after forming a wall.

Beginning in the 2020s, teams often choose to deploy a player to lie behind the wall, to prevent the free kick taker kicking the ball below the wall when the defenders jump anticipating a kick over the top. Colloquially this role has become known as a 'draught excluder'. A kicker who has the skill to curl the ball around a wall is at a distinct advantage. Since 2000, referees at the highest levels of football have used vanishing spray to enforce the 9.15-metre (10-yard) minimum required distance for the wall; referees without vanishing spray may indicate the minimum distance verbally and/or with hand gestures. In 2019, Law 13 was changed to require attacking players to maintain a minimum 1-metre (1-yard) distance from a defensive "wall" until the ball is in play.

== Offences for which the free kick is awarded ==
The following are the offences punishable by a free kick in the 2019 Laws of the Game. A free kick may be awarded only for an offence committed while the ball is in play, or at a restart of play. If an offence is committed in any other circumstance, the offending player may be punished with disciplinary action, but play restarts in the same manner it would have restarted without the offence.

=== Direct free kick / penalty kick ===
- handball (except for the goalkeeper within the penalty area)
- a player commits any of the following acts against an opponent in a manner considered by the referee to be careless, reckless or using excessive force:
  - charges
  - jumps at
  - kicks or attempts to kick
  - pushes
  - strikes or attempts to strike (including head-butt)
  - tackles or challenges
  - trips or attempts to trip
- holding an opponent
- impeding an opponent with contact
- biting or spitting at someone
- throwing an object at the ball, an opponent or a match official, or making contact with the ball with a held object
- any physical offence, if committed within the field of play while the ball is in play, against a team-mate, substitute, substituted or sent-off player, team official or a match official
- a player who requires the referee's permission to re-enter the field of play, substitute, substituted player, sent-off player, or team official performs one of the following acts:
  - enters the field of play without the referee's permission, and interferes with play
  - is on the field of play without the referee's permission while that person's team scores a goal (the goal is disallowed)
  - throws or kicks an object onto the field of play, if the object interferes with play, an opponent, or a match official.

=== Indirect free kick ===
- offside
- illegal handling by the goalkeeper within the penalty area
- preventing the goalkeeper from releasing the ball from the hands
- kicking (or attempting to kick) the ball when the goalkeeper is in the process of releasing it
- playing in a dangerous manner (without committing a more serious offence)
- impeding the progress of an opponent without any contact being made
- dissent
- offensive, insulting or abusive language and/or gestures
- any other verbal offences
- after having already been guilty of serious foul play, violent conduct or a second cautionable offence, a player challenges or interferes with an opponent while the referee is playing advantage (unless another more serious offence was committed)
- an offence committed outside the field of play by a player against a player, substitute, substituted player or team official of their own team
- the player taking a kick-off, free kick, penalty kick, throw-in, goal kick, or corner kick touches the ball a second time before it has been touched by another player (unless the second touch is a handball offence punishable by a direct free kick / penalty kick)
- when a free kick is taken, an attacking player is less than 1 m (1 yard) from a "wall" formed by three or more defending players
- a penalty kick is kicked backwards
- the kicker taking a penalty kick feints once the run-up has been completed
- a team-mate of the identified player takes a penalty kick
- delaying the game by using their body to trap the ball
- at a penalty kick, both the kicker and goalkeeper commit an offence at the same time, and the kick is scored (the goal is disallowed, and the indirect free kick is awarded to the defending team)
- at a penalty kick, an attacking player encroaches, and the ball does not enter the goal
- at a throw-in, an opponent unfairly distracts or impedes the thrower, or is closer than 2 metres to the place where the throw-in is to be taken, and play is stopped after the throw-in has been taken
- a player who requires the referee's permission to re-enter the field of play re-enters without the referee's permission, but does not interfere with play, and the referee decides to stop play to deal with the offence
- any other offence for which play is stopped to caution or send off a player

== History ==
=== Before 1863 ===
The concept of a free kick—i.e., an opportunity to kick the ball without being challenged by opponents—is found in public school football games from the early nineteenth century. The three situations in which the free kick was typically found are:

- as a reward for a fair catch
- after a touch-down
- after an offence by the opposing team

==== Fair catch ====
The fair catch was the most common reason for a free kick in football codes of the early nineteenth-century. An early example is found in the testimony of Matthew Bloxam, in the famous passage where he attributes the innovation of "running with the ball" at Rugby School to the actions of William Webb Ellis in 1823:

[Ellis] caught the ball in his arms. This being so, according to the then rules, he ought to have retired back as far as he pleased, without parting with the ball, for the combatants on the opposite side could only advance to the spot where he had caught the ball, and were unable to rush forward till he had either punted it or had placed it for some one else to kick, for it was by means of these place kicks that most of the goals were in those days kicked, but the moment the ball touched the ground, the opposite side might rush on.

The first published laws of football, those of Rugby School in 1845, confirm that a free kick was awarded for a catch:

Charging is fair, in case of a place-kick, as soon as a ball has touched the ground; in case of a kick from a catch, as soon as the player's foot has left the ground, and not before.

Although the 1848 "Cambridge rules" described by Henry C. Malden in 1897 have not survived, Malden implies that they awarded a free kick for a fair catch. The 1856 Cambridge rules, which do survive, explicitly awarded such a free kick:

When a player catches the ball directly from the foot, he may kick it as he can without running with it.

Other early codes awarding a free kick for a fair catch include Shrewsbury School (1855), Harrow School (1858), Sheffield FC (1858), Melbourne FC (1859), and Blackheath FC (1862). All these kicks, except for Sheffield's, permit a goal to be scored directly.

==== Touch-down ====
The free kick after a touch-down (also known as a "try at goal") is found at Rugby School from the mid-1830s. It is also found in Rugby-influenced codes, such as Marlborough College, and in the Cambridge Rules of 1863, which were drawn up by a committee including representatives from both Marlborough and Rugby.

==== After an offence by the opposition ====
The first Rugby School rules (1845) awarded a punt or a drop-kick to the opposition after a player took "a punt when he [was] not entitled to it". The 1846 revision of the Rugby School rules kept that rule, but added the provision that a goal could not be scored from such a drop-kick, giving an early example of an indirect free kick. Other codes that used a free kick to punish an infringement of the rules included the Uppingham laws of 1857 (for offside), and the Melbourne FC laws of 1860 (for any offence).

==== Summary ====
Year	Code	Name	Free kick awarded for		
Year	Code	Name	Fair catch	Touch down	Offence by opposition
1823	Rugby School (uncodified, based on later recollections)		direct		
c. 1834	Rugby School (uncodified, based on later recollections)		direct	direct	
1845	Rugby School	Place-kick; Punt; Drop	direct	direct	direct
1846	Rugby School	Place-kick; Punt; Drop	direct	direct	indirect
1847	Eton Field Game	—N/a	No	direct	No
1848	Cambridge Rules (as recalled by Malden)		Yes		
1855	Shrewsbury	Hoist	Yes		
1856	Cambridge Rules	"Kick it as he can"	direct	No	No
1857	Uppingham School	"Kick it as best he can" Fair kick	direct	No	direct
1858	Harrow School	Free kick	direct	No	No
1858	Sheffield FC	Free kick	indirect	No	No
1859	Melbourne FC	Free kick	direct	No	No
1860	Melbourne FC	Free kick	direct	No	direct
1862	Barnes FC	—N/a	No	No	No
1862	Blackheath FC	Free kick	direct	No	No
1862	Eton Field Game	—N/a	No	No	No
1862	The Simplest Game	—N/a	No	No	No
1863	Cambridge Rules	Free kick	No	direct	No
1863	Charterhouse School	—N/a	No	No	No
1863	Marlborough College		No	direct	
1863	Winchester College		Yes	No	No
1863	Football Association	Free kick	direct	direct	No

=== The 1863 FA Rules ===
The original laws of the Football Association, published in December 1863, awarded a free kick in two situations:

- Following a fair catch, which was defined as "when the ball is caught, after it has touched the person of an adversary, or has been kicked or knocked on by an adversary, and before it has touched the ground or one of the side catching it". The player making the fair catch had to claim it by "making a mark with his heel at once". As in the Rugby rules, opponents were allowed to come up to the mark in order to challenge the kick, with the player taking the kick being permitted to retreat backwards from the mark in order to evade the opponents' attentions. The player making the fair catch had to take the resulting free kick, from which a goal could be scored directly.
- Following a touch down behind the opponents' goal-line, in a manner similar to the contemporary Rugby "try at goal" or modern rugby conversion. The kick had to be taken from a point 15 yards (14 m) from the goal-line, in line with the place with the ball was touched down. The kick had to be taken at the goal, with opponents being obliged to remain behind their goal-line until the kick was taken. The kick could be taken by any member of the team who touched the ball down.

In both cases, the kick could be taken "in such manner as the kicker may think fit". This was interpreted as allowing a kick from hand (a punt or drop-kick), in addition to a place kick. In the first ever game played under Football Association rules, (Barnes v Richmond, 19 December 1863), Barnes FC attempted six such "tries at goal", but missed all of them.

=== Abolition (1866–1872) ===
At the first revision of the FA laws, in 1866, the free kick was removed from the game. Reference to the fair catch disappeared from the laws (though catching was still permitted), while the touch down, rather than being rewarded with a free kick, became a tie-breaker to be used when an equal number of goals was scored by each team.

In 1867, Sheffield Football Club proposed to the FA that handling should be banned, with a free kick awarded as punishment for handball. Records of the FA's annual meeting do not indicate that this proposal received any formal discussion, and it was not adopted: however, a similar proposal was incorporated into the inaugural laws of the Sheffield Football Association later that same year.

In 1870, handling was completely banned in the FA laws, upon the basis of a proposal by Upton Park FC. Wanderers FC and Civil Service FC both suggested that handling should be punished with a throw-in to the opposition, but their proposals were not adopted.

=== Reintroduction (1872–1873) ===
In 1872, the free kick was reintroduced, on the basis of a proposal by Harrow Chequers F.C. It was awarded to punish illegal handling of the ball, and did not allow a goal to be scored directly. The 1872 laws neglected to define exactly how a free kick should be taken; this omission was made up in 1873, when it was specified that the ball must be on the ground, with opponents at least six yards (5.5 m) from the ball, unless behind their own goal-line. These restrictions were proposed by Clapton Pilgrims, and amended by Francis Marindin of Royal Engineers FC.

=== Subsequent developments ===
==== Position of opponents ====
In 1913, the distance opponents were required to retreat was increased from six yards (5.5 m) to ten yards (9.15 m). In 1936, it was further specified that players could be less than ten yards (9.15 m) away only if they were on the goal-line between the posts (rather than anywhere on the goal-line).

In 1965, opponents were required to remain outside the penalty area when a free kick was being taken from within the kicking team's penalty area. (A similar change had been made to the laws for the goal kick in 1948).

==== Position of teammates ====
In 2019, members of the team taking the free kick were forbidden from standing within one metre of any "wall" made by the defensive team.

==== Putting the ball into play ====
In 1887, it was specified that "[t]he ball must at least be rolled over before it shall be considered played". This requirement was made more precise in 1895: the ball "must make a complete circuit or travel the distance of its circumference" before being in play. In 1997, this requirement was eliminated: the ball became in play as soon as it was kicked and moved (and left the penalty area, if necessary; see below). In 2016, it was specified that the ball must "clearly" move.

In 1937, a free kick taken within the kicking team's own penalty area was required to leave the penalty area before being considered in play. This followed a parallel change in the goal-kick law the previous year. Both changes were reversed in 2019.

==== Method of kicking ====
In 2007, the laws specified that feinting, and lifting the ball with one or both feet, were both legitimate methods of taking a free kick.

==== Dribbling ====
In 1874, the player taking the free kick was forbidden from touching the ball again until it had been played by another player.

==== Scoring a goal directly ====
When reintroduced in 1872, the free kick did not permit a goal to be scored.

In 1891, the penalty kick was introduced, for certain offences committed within 12 yards (11 m) of the goal-line. The penalty kick permitted a goal to be scored directly (unlike the free kick, which was still exclusively indirect).

In 1903 the direct free kick was reintroduced, for the same offences penalized by a penalty kick when committed in the penalty area.

In 1927, the laws were amended to prevent an own goal from being scored directly from any free kick (whether direct or indirect).

==== Awarded within the goal area ====
In 1978, it was specified that a free kick awarded to a team within its own goal-area could be taken from any point within that half of the goal-area in which the offence occurred. This change was made in order to remove any disadvantage that might come from being forced to take the kick from a "restricted position" near the goal-posts. In 1992, this provision was further widened to permit such a free kick to be taken from any point within the goal-area. This change, which was proposed "to reduce time-wasting", was made in conjunction with a parallel change to the goal kick law.

In 1984, it was specified that an indirect free kick awarded for an offence within the opposing team's goal area should be taken at the closest point on the six-yard (5.5 m) line. This change was made in order to avoid "crowding" and "jostling".

==== Remedy for infringements ====
In 1882, an indirect free kick was awarded to the opposing side if the player taking the free kick touched the ball twice. In 1905, encroachment by the opposition at a free kick was also punished with an indirect free kick. In 1938, this punishment was eliminated; it was specified instead that, in the event of encroachment, the referee "shall delay the taking of the kick until the Law is complied with". In 1937, it was specified that if a free kick taken from within the kicking side's penalty area did not leave the penalty area, it should be retaken. This requirement was removed in 2019.

In 2019, the laws were modified to state that, if a team-mate of the kicker was closer than one metre to a "wall" formed by the defending team, an indirect free kick should be awarded.

==== Offside from a free kick ====
The laws of football have always penalized an offside offence committed directly from a free kick. The free kick contrasts, in this respect, with other restarts of play such as the goal kick, corner kick, and throw-in.

An unsuccessful proposal to remove the possibility of being offside from a direct free kick was made in 1929. Similar proposals to prevent offside offences from any free kick were advanced in 1974 and 1986, each time without success. In 1987, the Football Association (FA) obtained the permission of IFAB to test such a rule in the 1987-88 GM Vauxhall Conference. At the next annual meeting, the FA reported to IFAB that the experiment had, as predicted, "assisted further the non-offending team and also generated more action near goal, resulting in greater excitement for players and spectators"; it nevertheless withdrew the proposal.

==== Offences for which the kick was awarded ====
===== Illegal handling =====
As mentioned above, the free kick was revived in 1872 to punish illegal handling (by the goalkeeper or any other player). In 1903, when the direct free kick was reintroduced, it was used to punish handball: technical handling offences by the goalkeeper continued to be punished by an indirect free kick.

===== Foul play =====
In 1874, the use of the free kick was extended to cover offences resulting from foul play. Since 1903, when the direct free kick was reintroduced, most forms of foul play have been punished by a direct free kick. The exceptions, punished by an indirect free kick, are listed below:

- Dangerous play (since 1903)
- Obstructing / impeding the progress of an opponent(1951-2016) and impeding an opponent without contact (from 2016)
- Charging when not attempting to play the ball (1948-1997)
- Charging the goalkeeper in an illegal manner (1903-1997)
- Preventing the goalkeeper from releasing the ball (from 1997)
- Kicking (or attempting to kick) the ball when the goalkeeper is in the process of releasing it (from 2016)

===== Disciplinary offences / misconduct =====
Since 1907, an indirect free kick has been awarded whenever play is stopped to send off a player (unless the laws called for a direct free kick or penalty kick). In 1934, this principle was extended to cautions.

From 1967 to 2000, there was a separate offence of timewasting by the goalkeeper, punishable by an indirect free kick.

===== Offences at the restart of play =====
In 1882, an indirect free kick was awarded for a double touch at a free kick, throw-in, goal kick, or kick-off. In 1901, this was extended to a double touch at a penalty kick. Encroachment by the opposition has been punished by an indirect free kick at various times:

- at the kick-off (1887-1903)
- at a free kick (1905-1938)
- at a goal kick (1905-1937)
- at a corner kick (until 1973)

The indirect free kick was also awarded for a foul throw from 1882. In 1931, this remedy was changed to a throw-in to the opposition.

===== Offside =====
Offside has been punished by an indirect free kick since 1874.

=== Summary ===
Date	Goal may be scored directly		May be kicked from hand	Ball may be touched twice	Minimum distance (opponents)	Taken from kicking team's penalty area		Position when taken from goal area		Remedy for infringement		Date
Date	Attacking goal	Own goal	May be kicked from hand	Ball may be touched twice	Minimum distance (opponents)	Ball must leave penalty area	Opponents must be outside penalty area	Of kicking team	Of opponents	Double-touch	Encroachment by opposition	Date
1863	Yes		Yes	Yes	—N/a	—N/a				—N/a		1863
1866	—N/a											1866
1872	No		Not specified	Yes	Not specified	—N/a				—N/a	—N/a	1872
1873	No		No	Yes	6 yards (5.5 m)	—N/a				—N/a	Not specified	1873
1874	No		No	No	6 yards (5.5 m)	—N/a				Not specified	Not specified	1874
1882	No		No	No	6 yards (5.5 m)	—N/a				Indirect free kick	Not specified	1882
1902	No		No	No	6 yards (5.5 m)	No	No	From place of offence	From place of offence	Indirect free kick	Not specified	1902
1903	Direct free kick only		No	No	6 yards (5.5 m)	No	No	From place of offence	From place of offence	Indirect free kick	Not specified	1903
1905	Direct free kick only		No	No	6 yards (5.5 m)	No	No	From place of offence	From place of offence	Indirect free kick	Indirect free kick	1905
1913	Direct free kick only		No	No	10 yards (9.15 m)	No	No	From place of offence	From place of offence	Indirect free kick	Indirect free kick	1913
1927	Direct free kick only	No	No	No	10 yards (9.15 m)	No	No	From place of offence	From place of offence	Indirect free kick	Indirect free kick	1927
1937	Direct free kick only	No	No	No	10 yards (9.15 m)	Yes	No	From place of offence	From place of offence	Indirect free kick	Indirect free kick	1937
1938	Direct free kick only	No	No	No	10 yards (9.15 m)	Yes	No	From place of offence	From place of offence	Indirect free kick	Retake	1938
1965	Direct free kick only	No	No	No	10 yards (9.15 m)	Yes	Yes	From place of offence	From place of offence	Indirect free kick	Retake	1965
1978	Direct free kick only	No	No	No	10 yards (9.15 m)	Yes	Yes	From that half of goal area in which offence was committed	From place of offence	Indirect free kick	Retake	1978
1984	Direct free kick only	No	No	No	10 yards (9.15 m)	Yes	Yes	From that half of goal area in which offence was committed	From the nearest point on the six-yard (5.5 m) line	Indirect free kick	Retake	1984
1992	Direct free kick only	No	No	No	10 yards (9.15 m)	Yes	Yes	From anywhere within the goal area	From the nearest point on the six-yard (5.5 m) line	Indirect free kick	Retake	1992
2019	Direct free kick only	No	No	No	10 yards (9.15 m)	No	Yes	From anywhere within the goal area	From the nearest point on the six-yard (5.5 m) line	Indirect free kick	Retake	2019

== Records and statistics ==
Most free kick goals all-time

This list includes direct free kicks only, excluding indirect ones, and counts only official matches. Only players with at least 50 goals are included.

As of 27 September 2026

R	Player	Years	Goals
1	(Brazil) Marcelinho Carioca	1988–2012	78
2	(Argentina) Lionel Messi	2004–present	76
3	(Brazil) Jair	1938–1963	74
4	(Brazil) Roberto Dinamite	1971–1993	73
5	(Serbia) Siniša Mihajlović	1986–2006	72
6	(Brazil) Juninho Pernambucano	1993–2013	72
7	(Brazil) Marcos Assunção	1993–2016	68
8	(Chile) Jorge Aravena	1978–1993	65
9	(Portugal) Cristiano Ronaldo	2002–present	64
10	(Brazil) Zico	1971–1994	62
11	(Argentina) Diego Maradona	1976–1997	61
12	(Brazil) Rogério Ceni	1990–2015	59
13	(Greece) Kostas Frantzeskos	1990-2005	57
14	(Brazil) Ronaldinho	1998–2015	57
15	(Japan) Shunsuke Nakamura	1997–2022	56
16	(England) David Beckham	1992–2013	53
17	(Italy) Alessandro Del Piero	1991–2014	51
18	(Netherlands) Pierre van Hooijdonk	1989–2007	51
