= 1864–65 Barnes F.C. season =

Barnes
1864-65 season
- Captain: Ebenezer Morley
- Secretary: Robert Willis
- Rules: Laws of the Game (1863)
- Season opened: 5 October 1864

This was the third season of Barnes Football Club. Significant developments included the club's first known "athletic sports" event, a day on which club members and members of the public were invited to take part in athletic competitions.

22 October 1864	Officers of the Club	0-2	Nineteen of the Club
Note: Officers of the club had eleven players.

29 October 1864	Captain's Eleven	2-0	All-Comers
Note: 3 of the "captain's eleven" did not play, leaving that team with only eight players. All-comers "mustered nineteen".

5 November 1864	Captain's Eleven	v	All-Comers
Note: Match scheduled, but no report of the result was found.

3 December 1864	Barnes	0-0	Crystal Palace	Barnes
Note: Match lasted 90 minutes, and "was ended by darkness". Crystal Palace scored a touch-down, but missed the resulting free-kick. Barnes: M. Roberts, Whittaker, et al. Crystal Palace: R. Abraham, L. Irons, H. Lloyd, et al.

4 February 1865	Crystal Palace	0-0	Barnes	Penge
15:00
Note: 15-a-side. Match ended at 16:45. Ground was "in a dreadful state, being almost under water".

4 March 1865	Barnes	1-2	Crystal Palace	Barnes
	Grosvenor (60)		J. Sharland, Unknown
Note: Barnes (15 players): E. C. Morley (capt.), Conout, Courtney, Elton, Graham, Greenhill, Grosvenor, Nettleship, O'Leary, Price, Sheppard, Stevens, Sutherland, Tebbs, Willis. Crystal Palace (15 players): T. Turner (capt.), E. Abraham, D. Allport, F. Allport, W. Allport, F. Collins, E. Cutbill, W. Cutbill, F. Morris, Grose, Irons, H. Lloyd, T. Lloyd, Rohde, Sharland.

== Athletic Sports ==
- Date: 25 March 1865
- Venue: The Limes, Mortlake. (Field lent by Marsh Nelson adjacent to the White Hart public house)
- Stewards: Ebenezer Morley, M. Dewsnap, Robert Graham, C. H. Tubbs
- Secretary: Robert Willis
- Events: 100 yards race, half mile race, one mile race, 150 yard hurdle race, long jump, high jump, putting the shell, kicking the football.
