= 1873–74 Barnes F.C. season =

Barnes
1873-74 season
- Captain: Charles Morice
- Rules: Laws of the Game (1873)
- FA Cup: Second round
Home colours

This was the twelfth season of Barnes Football Club.

== FA Cup ==
25 October 1873 First round	First Surrey Rifles	0-0	Barnes	Drill Ground, Flodden Road, Camberwell
Note: First Surrey Rifles (11 players): H. J. Hooper (capt.), R. Allport, J. P. Challoner (back), T. Edmonton, W. Foster, E. Frost, P. W. Greenhow (back), J. H. Lock, W. J. Maynard, A. F. Stevens, W. A. Willis (goalkeeper). Barnes (11 players): C. F. Morice (capt.), A. Adams (back), A. T. Brunskill, C. W. Chapman, F. C. Clarkson, H. Ellis (goalkeeper), H. A. Hudson, H. E. Solly (half-back), R. H. Solly, F. E. Weston, J. B. Wood.

8 November 1873 First round (replay)	Barnes	1-0	First Surrey Rifles	Barnes
	H. A. Hudson
Note: "Stephenson's back play was the feature of the match"

22 November 1873 Second round	Oxford University	2-0	Barnes	Oxford
	Patton, unknown
Note: First goal was scored "just before half-time". Second goal was from a free-kick awarded for handball. Oxford University included Mackarness, Ottaway, Patton, Vidal. Barnes included Adams, Highton, Stevenson

== Friendly matches ==
11 October 1873	Barnes	1-0	Crystal Palace	Barnes
	C. Highton
Note:

18 October 1873	Barnes	v	Royal Engineers	Barnes
Note: Match scheduled, but no report was found.

1 November 1873	Clapham Rovers	4-1	Barnes	Balham
Note:

15 November 1873	Brondesbury F.C.	0-1	Barnes	Kensington Park Cricket Ground
			Morice
Note: Match was originally scheduled to be played in Kilburn; Barnes players expected to play there, then "had to charter cabs" to travel to the new venue"; the game only lasted for thirty minutes

6 December 1873	Reigate Priory F.C.	D-D	Barnes	Reigate
Note:

13 December 1873	Charterhouse School	v	Barnes	Godalming
Note:

20 December 1873	Crystal Palace	4-0	Barnes	Crystal Palace
	R. K. Kingsford (2 goals); C. E. Smith, unknown
Note:

27 December 1873	South Norwood F.C.	v	Barnes	Norwood
Note: Match scheduled, but no report was found.

3 January 1873	Barnes	v	Reigate Priory F.C.	Barnes
Note: Match scheduled, but no report was found.

17 January 1873	Barnes	1-2	Clapham Rovers	Barnes
	unknown		Hatch, unknown
Note: This was Clapham Rovers' "second eleven". Barnes (11 players): C. J. Morice (capt.), A. Adams (back), J. K. Barnes, F. C. Clarkson, H. A. Hudson, H. T. Jackson (half-back), A. Nother, H. S. Otter, T. Pearson, C. Vigne, V. Weston, Clapham Rovers (11 players): H. S. Bevington (capt.), E. C. Anwyl, C. D. Chapman, F. P. Francis (back), H. A. Francis, Edgar Field (half-back), W. K. Hatch, D. R. Hunter, H. Lawford, J. H. Sprott, J. E. Worlledge.

24 January 1873	First Surrey Rifles	0-1	Barnes	Camberwell
15:00	Hudson
Note: First Surrey Rifles (12 players): H. L. Hooper (capt.), R. L. Allport, W. L. Bennett, J. D. Challoner (back), P. Drummler (back), T. Edmonton, W. C. Foster, A. R. Kirkpatrick, G. Kirkpatrick, F. Maynard, W. J. Maynard, A. F. Stevens. Barnes (12 players): C. J. Morice (capt.), A. Adams (back), G. W. Chapman (half-back), O. D. Chapman, F. C. Clarkson, F. P. Francis, H. A. Hudson, H. S. Jackson (half-back), H. F. Lawford, P. Jones, T. Palmer, V. Weston,

7 February 1874	Royal Engineers	v	Barnes	Chatham
Note: Match scheduled, but no report was found.

21 February 1874	Barnes	v	South Norwood F.C.	Barnes
Note: Match scheduled, but no report was found.

28 February 1874	Barnes	v	Brondesbury F.C.	Barnes
Note: Match scheduled, but no report was found.
