= 1866–67 Barnes F.C. season =

Barnes
1866-67 season
- Captain: Ebenezer Morley
- Secretary: Robert Willis
- Stadium: Field lent by T. Marsh Nelson, "The Limes", Mortlake
- Rules: Laws of the Game (1866); Laws of the Game (1867) (after 26 February 1867)
- Season opened: 6 October 1866

This was the fifth season of Barnes Football Club. The club's season opened with a game between club members on 6 October 1866. With membership of the Football Association being at a low ebb, the club played very few matches against external opposition.

10 November 1866	Barnes	3 (2) - 0 (0)	Rev. G. Frost's Pupils ((from Kensington School)	Barnes
Note:

21 November 1866	Barnes	2 (4) - 0 (1)	Rev. G. Frost's Pupils (from Kensington School)	Barnes
	Goals: C. Boyle, Unknown; Touches Down: Unknown
Note: Barnes (11 players): C. Boyle, R. Courtenay, A. Dunnage, J. Graham, F. Gulston, E. B. Pocklington, R. Shephard, S. Le B. Smith, A. Ward, Warren, R. W. Willis; Pupils: Archibald, Martin, Robinson, et al.

8 December 1866	Barnes	0 (0) - 0 (3)	Civil Service	Barnes
Note:

23 February 1867	Barnes	0 (2) - 0 (2)	Rev. T. J. Batey's Pupils (from Worlabye House)	Barnes
Note: Barnes (11 players): E. C. Morley (captain), T. R. Barnes, H. Collins, W. R. Collins, A. Dunnage, R. G. Graham, F. Gulston, M. Roberts, G. W. Ward, Warren, R. W. Willis; Pupils (11 players): Stephenson (captain), Allcard, Lord Beresford, Hon. C. Beresford, C. Boyle, H. Boyle, Clabburn, Coryton, D. Hay, Lindsay, Nipper.

== Athletic Sports ==
- Date: 30 March 1867
- Venue: Field belonging to J. Johnstone, Barnes.
- Committee: Ebenezer Morley (starter), R. W. Willis, A. D. Houseman (judges).
- Events: 100 yards flat race, 1000 yards handicap flat race, one mile flat race, "football race", 220 yards hurdle race, one mile steeplechase, high jump, high jump with pole
