= 1877 in association football =

The following are events in 1877 which are relevant to the development of association football. Included are events in closely related codes, such as the Sheffield Rules, amalgamated into the FA Rules in 1877.

== Events ==
- The Sheffield Rules are amalgamated into the FA Rules.

== Clubs founded ==
=== England ===
- Buxton
- Clitheroe
- Crewe Alexandra
- Egham Town (originally known as Runnymede Rovers)
- Wolverhampton Wanderers

=== Scotland ===
- Clyde
- St Mirren

== Domestic cups ==
Nation	Tournament	Winner	Score	Runner-up	Venue	Title	Previous title won
England	1876–77 FA Cup	Wanderers	2–1 (after extra time, 1-1 at 90 minutes)	Oxford University	Kennington Oval	4th	1876
Scotland	1876–77 Scottish Cup	Vale of Leven	3–2 (second replay, following two 1-1 draws)	Rangers	Hampden Park	1st	None

== Births ==
- 25 February – John Tait Robertson (d. 1935), Scotland international half-back in sixteen matches (1898–1905).
- 27 April – Andy Aitken (d. 1955), Scotland international half-back in fourteen matches (1901–1911).
- 13 May – Robert Hamilton (d. 1948), Scotland international forward in eleven matches (1899–1911), scoring fifteen goals.
- 15 September – Peter McBride (d. 1951), Scotland international goalkeeper in six matches (1904–1909).
- 2 October – John Campbell (d. 1919), Scotland international forward in four matches (1899–1901), scoring six goals.
- 4 October – Jimmy Watson (d. unknown), Scotland international full-back in six matches (1903–1909).
- 22 November – Herbert Smith (d. 1951), England international full-back in four matches (1905–1906).
