= 1868–69 Barnes F.C. season =

Barnes
1868-69 season
- Captain: Robert Willis
- Secretary: Robert Graham / Lewis Karslake
- Stadium: Field near White Hart Inn, Mortlake
- Rules: Laws of the Game (1867); Laws of the Game (1869) (after 26 February 1869)
- Season opened: 10 October 1868
Home colours

This was the seventh season of Barnes Football Club.

31 October 1868	Barnes	1-0	Crystal Palace	Barnes
	Adams/Routh
Note: Game ended at 16:45. Barnes (12 players): R. W. Willis (capt.), Adams, W. C. Butler, C. Butler Collins, S. Lee, P. Rhodes, D. M. Roberts, C. Routh, B. Smith, P. Weston, C. H. Warren, E. Weston. Crystal Palace (12 players): D. Allport (capt.), H. Butterfield, A. C. Chamberlain, A. Cutbill, R. Cutbill, H. Daukes, C. Farquhar, D. Huggins, A. L. Lloyd, A. Morten, G. Parr, E. M. Stone.

21 November 1868	Barnes	0-1	Civil Service	Barnes
Note: Barnes (9 players, becoming 11 by the end of the match): Rhodes, Weston, Willis, et al. Civil Service: Lee, Lindsay, Thesiger, et al.

28 November 1868	Barnes	0-0	Royal Engineers	Barnes
				Attendance: "Large assemblage of spectators, several ladies among their number"
Note: Game lasted 90 minutes. Barnes (12 players): R. W. Willis (capt.), Adams, H. Collins, W. R. Collins, R. G. Graham, F. W. Gulstone, P. Rhodes, D. M. Roberts, C. Routh, Lord F. Stephenson, C. H. Warren, P. Weston. Royal Engineers (13 players): Denison (capt.), Chambers, Danbury, Day, Dorward, Fellows, Fuller, Harrison, Johnston, Lambert, Macgregor, Morris, Preston.

12 December 1868	N.N.	v	Barnes	Kilburn
Note: Match scheduled, but no report was found.

23 January 1869	Crystal Palace	0-0	Barnes	Crystal Palace
15:30
Note: Barnes (12 players): R. G. Graham (capt.), Collins, H. Hackblock, Holt, W. Nettleship, P. Rhodes, C. Routh, Stone, C. Warren, E. Weston, P. Weston. Crystal Palace (12 players): D. Allport (capt.), F. Abel, A. C. Chamberlin, R. Cutbill, S. W. Daukes, W. G. F. Ellis, C. Farquhar, A. Lloyd, A. Morten, G. Parr, C. Eastlake Smith.

13 February 1869	Barnes	v	Civil Service	Barnes
Note: Match scheduled, but no report was found.

20 February 1869	Royal Engineers	v	Barnes	Chatham
Note: Match scheduled, but no report was found.

6 March 1869	Barnes	v	N.N.	Barnes
Note: Match scheduled, but no report was found.

== Athletic Sports ==
- Date: 20 March 1869
- Venue: Field belonging to J. Johnstone, White Hart, Mortlake.
- Committee: A. D. Houseman (starter), F. W. Bryant, R. W. Willis (judges), J. Westell, H. F. Wilkinson, F. W. Bryant, J. G. Webster
- Events: 100 yards race, 400 yards race handicap, one and a half mile walking handicap, 150 yards hurdles, one mile handicap steeplechase, high jump, high jump with pole, vaulting.
