= 1872–73 Barnes F.C. season =

Barnes
1872-73 season
- Captain: Charles Morice
- Secretary: H. Ernest Solly
- Rules: Laws of the Game (1872); Laws of the Game (1873) (after 26 February 1873)
- FA Cup: First round
Home colours

This was the eleventh season of Barnes Football Club. Barnes were surprisingly eliminated in the first round of the F.A. Cup by the debutants South Norwood, despite having far greater experience with association football rules. Club captain Charles Morice played for England in the first international match against Scotland.

== FA Cup ==
19 October 1872 First round	Barnes	0-1	South Norwood	Barnes Common
			Walshe (10)
Note: Barnes (11 players): C. J. Morice (capt.), A. Adams, W. C. Butler, G. W. Chapman, O. D. Chapman, F. Clarkson, A. R. Dunnage, C. Hudson, H. E. Solly, C. H. Warren, T. Weston. South Norwood (11 players): W. H. White (capt.), Dickinson, A. L. Elborough, W. C. Elborough, G. R. Fleet, C. E. Leeds, J. Smith, R. Smith, T. Viall, G. V. Walshe, F. White.

== Friendly matches ==
26 October 1872	Clapham Rovers	1-0	Barnes	Clapham
c. 15:40	Thompson (c. 15)
Note: The game ended prematurely at 16:45 because of rain. Clapham Rovers (11 players): C. Bergmann, Birkett (goalkeeper), H. A. Bryden, C. R. Daly, R. Ogilvie, H. Parker, W. E. Sprott, P. R. St. Quintin, C. C. Tayloe, A. Thompson, C. H. Wollaston; Barnes (10 players): C. J. Morice (capt.), F. C. Clarkson, R. S. Evans, Rev. J. Graham, H. A. Hudson, J. Lawford, C. Ommaney, H. M. Solly, E. J. Weston, V. Weston.

2 November 1872	Royal Engineers	2-0	Barnes	Chatham
Note: Royal Engineers (11 players): F. Marindin (capt.), W. Baddely, G. Barker, J. E. Blackburn, E. W. Cotter, A. G. Goodwyn, Merriman, E. Muirhead, C. Nugent, P. G. Von Donnop, C. K. Wood. Barnes (9 players, with 2 substitutes provided by the Royal Engineers): C. J. Morice (capt.), A. Adams, B. Collings, A. D. Chapman, J. W. Chapman, F. C. Clarkson, J. Graham, F. B. Soden, E. Weston. Substitutes: Nicholls, Wilkieson.

9 November 1872	Barnes Beagles	v	Barnes	Green Man, Wimbledon
Note: Match scheduled, but no report was found.

16 November 1872	Barnes	0-0	Crystal Palace	Barnes
c. 15:30
Note: Barnes (10 players): A. C. Butler (capt.), A. Adams, C. C. Boyle, F. C. Clarkson, A. W. Collings, J. Graham, Hudson, E. T. Weston, H. E. Solly, S. E. Solly. Crystal Palace 10 players): D. Allport (capt.), A. Bouch, W. Bouch, W. Dorling, S. R. Fleet, J. H. Kingsford, C. Kolle, S. Manvell, F. Soden, J. Turner.

23 November 1872	Captain's Eleven	v	All Comers	Barnes
Note: Match scheduled, but no report was found.

30 November 1872	Barnes	v	Windsor Home Park	Barnes
Note: Match scheduled, but no report was found.

7 December 1872	Charterhouse School	3-0	Barnes
	Parry, Firth, Verelst
Note: Charterhouse School (12 players): T. P. Gandell (capt.), H. W. Davies, W. W. Drew, F. H. Firth, W. Empson, A. H. Gipps, H. G. Jeaffreson, E. H. Parry, G. E. Staveley, C. Verelst, E. Williams, W. C. Williams. Barnes (12 players): C. J. Morice (capt.), O. D. Chapman, F. C. Clarkson, H. Cobbett, R. Evans, J. Graham, H. A. Hudson, J. Palmer, A. Scott, H. E. Solly, R. H. Solly, E. T. Weston,

4 January 1873	Barnes	v	Barnes Beagles	Barnes Railway Station
Note: Match scheduled, but no report was found.

11 January 1873	Barnes	1-0	Clapham Rovers	Barnes
15:15	Highton (c. 10)
Note: Barnes (11 players): E. T. Weston (capt.), A. Adams, F. C. Clarkson, J. Graham, C. Highton, T. Mossendew (goalkeeper), C. Ommaney, F. Pawle, H. E. Solly, C. Todd, V. Weston. Clapham Rovers (12 players): C. C. Bryden (capt.), H. A. Bryden, W. E. Buckie, W. Field, F. P. Francis, R. G. Fricker, J. P. Harris, B. R. Hunter, H. Ker, C. Kolle, W. H. Nuttall, H. Rose.

18 January 1873	Crystal Palace	2-0	Barnes
	Chenery (c. 20), own goal
Note: Crystal Palace (11 players): D. Allport (capt.), W. M. Allport, C. C. Armitage, W. R. Collins, C. F. Cumberlege, C. J. Chenery, G. R. Fleet, A. Lloyd, A. S. Thomson, J. Turner, J. H. Vigne. Barnes (10 players): E. J. Weston (capt.), F. C. Clarkson, H. Collins, H. Ellis, J. Graham, A. C. Highton, F. B. Pawle, F. B. Soden, E. Solly, C. J. Todd.

15 February 1873	Barnes	0-5	Royal Engineers	Barnes
Note: The Barnes ground proper being laid down with manure, glass bottles, &c., the contest took place on an adjoining field, which, being very rough, prevented any good display of dribbling. Barnes (11 players): A. Adams, G. W. Chapman, C. Cobbett, O. D. Chapman, F. C. Clarkson, A. R. Collins, F. Graham, C. Ommaney, H. E. Solly, E. J. Weston, V. Weston. Royal Engineers (11 players): F. Marindin (capt.), G. Barker, Blackburn, Digby, Goodwyn, Muirhead, Olivier, Ord, Ruck, Teach, Wood

22 February 1873	Barnes	1-0	Windsor Home Park	Barnes
Note: Barnes (11 players): A. Adams (capt.), J. W. Chapman, F. C. Clarkson, J. Graham, C. Heighton, J. Hudson, J. Palmer, F. Pawle, H. Solly, G. Weston, V. Weston. Windsor Home Park (11 players): W. Nicholls (capt.), H. G. Balley, G. R. Bambridge, H. Bird, P. Chamberlain, H. Clark, G. Gower, Frank Heran, A. Joll, J. Roberts, W. Whitfield.

c. 15 March 1873	Brondesbury	D-D	Barnes
Note: The final match of the season for Barnes.

== Athletic Sports ==
- Date: 5 April 1873
- Venue: Field of J. Johnstone.
- Committee: O. D. Chapman (treasurer), W. M. Chinnery, F. C. Clarkson, H. Ellis, F. S. Gulston, C. J. Michod, C. J. Morice, E. C. Morley, J. Parker, J. Powell, D. M. Roberts, W. Rye, H. Ernest Solly (secretary), R. W. Willis
- Events: 100 yards, 100 yards handicap, 400 yards handicap, 1200(?) yards handicap, 2 miles handicap, one mile steeplechase, 5 miles steeplechase (run 22 March), 150 yards hurdle, mile and a half walking handicap, high jump, pole jump
