= 1870–71 Barnes F.C. season =

Barnes
1870-71 season
- Captain: Robert Willis / C. Routh
- Secretary: James Powell
- Rules: Laws of the Game (1870); Laws of the Game (1871) (after 27 February 1871)
Home colours

This was the ninth season of Barnes Football Club.

22 October 1870	Barnes	1-0	Clapham Rovers	Barnes
15:00
Note:

29 October 1870	Barnes	0-1	Royal Engineers	Barnes
			G. Barker
Note: "One of the pleasantest matches ever played". The goal was scored "within one minute of time". Barnes (11 players): R. W. Willis (capt.), Butler, Collins, Crake, Graham, Heighton, Rhodes, Routh, Roberts, Warren, Weston. Royal Engineers (11 players): G. Barker (capt.), Addison, Clarke, Crompton, Esswell, Hoskyns, Mitchell, Ord, Pilkington, Renny-Tailyour, Tressider.

12 November 1870	Crystal Palace	1-1	Barnes	Crystal Palace
Note: The game was played "under the new rule of 'no hands,' but the arrangement found so little favour that the return match is to be contested under the old regulations" [the FA laws introduced in February 1870 completely banned handling of the ball].

26 November 1870	Barnes	1-0	London Athletic Club	Barnes
15:30	Crake
Note: Match was intended to last 75 minutes, but it was agreed to stop play after 65 minutes owing to darkness. Barnes (11 players): C. Routh (capt.), W. C. Butler, W. R. Collins, W. P. Crake, A. C. Highton, F. C. Highton, C. Ommanney, D. M. Roberts, C. H. Warren, E. T. Weston, P. Weston; London Athletic Club (10 players): J. Cockerell (capt.), J. Buchanan, A. Cooper, C. A. Cream, C. J. Chenery, R. S. Evans, C. C. Harvey, W. Pilcher, P. Rhodes, J. Wilkinson (substitute).

7 December 1870	Charterhouse School	D-D	Barnes	Under Green, Godalming
Note: "The ground was in wretched condition, but the play, notwithstanding, was good, though it led to nothing decisive".

7 January 1871	Clapham Rovers	v	Barnes	Clapham
Note: Match scheduled, but no report was found.

14 January 1871	Barnes	v	Crystal Palace	Barnes
Note: Match scheduled, but no report was found.

28 January 1871	Royal Engineers	v	Barnes	Barnes
Note: Match scheduled, but no report was found.

4 February 1871	Barnes	3-0	Charterhouse School	Barnes
15:30	C. C. Boyle, P. Weston, W. C. Butler
Note: Barnes (11 players): C. T. Routh (capt.), C. C. Boyle, W. C. Butler, W. R. Collins, G. Crake, W. P. Crake, Rev. J. Graham, A. C. Highton, E. C. Highton, E. T. Weston, P. Weston; Charterhouse School (11 players): E. F. Brown, G. C. Carter, W. Dorling, W. Drew, T. P. Gandell, L. Gordon, J. F. Inglis, C. G. Paget, E. H. Parry, E. V. Ravenshaw, A. R. Saunders,

18 February 1871	Barnes	v	London Athletic Club	Barnes
Note: Match scheduled, but no report was found.

== Athletic Sports ==
- Date: 1 April 1871
- Venue: "The football field"
- Committee: O. D. Chapman (treasurer), W. M. Chinnery, W. M. M. Dowdall, F. S. Gulston, L. Karslake, E. C. Morley, F. G. Ommanney, J. Powell (hon. sec.), D. M. Roberts, C. H. Warren, R. W. Willis.
- Events: 100 yards flat race, 400 yards flat race handicap, 1320 yards flat race handicap, (half-mile handicap), 150 yards hurdles, one mile handicap steeplechase, five miles handicap steeplechase (run 18 March), two miles handicap walking, high jump, long jump running, vaulting
