= 1862–63 Barnes F.C. season =

Barnes
1862-63 season
- Captain: Ebenezer Morley
- Stadium: Barn Elms Park
- Rules: Rules of Barnes Football Club (1862), compromise rules.

This was the first season of Barnes FC following its foundation in 1862. Since a standard set of laws of football did not yet exist (the Football Association would not be founded until 1863), Barnes drew up its own rules to govern play, choosing to prohibit carrying the ball. Though its rules stated that "the season shall commence on the first Saturday in October", Barnes FC's first game (against neighbouring Richmond FC) is not recorded until the end of November. In December, Barnes played Blackheath FC, a club which played a rugby-style game that allowed running with the ball and "hacking" (kicking opponents in the shins). The resulting clash of styles forced "mutual concessions" to be made as to the rules for this game. It was nevertheless a lively match, featuring "dangerous mélées" in which club captain Ebenezer Morley narrowly escaped being "garrotted". In the first half of 1863, Barnes played against N.N. Club and Forest FC (later renamed Wanderers FC), two teams who, like Barnes, preferred a dribbling game; both would join Barnes in becoming founder members of the Football Association later that year.

29 November 1862	Barnes	2-0	Richmond	Barnes
	Hives (~20); Gregory (~40)			Stadium: Barn Elms Park; Attendance: "A large number of spectators, including many of the fair sex".
Note: Game was "first two goals in three". "Each goal was gained in about twenty minutes".

13 December 1862	Richmond	0-1 match abandoned owing to bad light	Barnes	Richmond
			Gregory (20)	Stadium: Richmond Green; Attendance: 400-500
Note: Richmond: Marryat (capt.), Anderson, Danvers, Hudson et al. Barnes: Morley (capt.), Gregory, Hives, et al.

20 December 1862	Barnes	0-2	Blackheath	Barnes
				Stadium: Barn Elms Park
Note: Mutual concessions were made as to the rules. Blackheath (15 players): Burnett (capt.), et al. Barnes: Morley (capt.), Gregory, Roberts, Willis, et al.

25 January 1863	N.N.	4-0	Barnes
Note:

20 February 1863	Barnes	0-1	Forest
			Unknown (90)	Attendance: "A goodly muster, including many of the fair sex"
Note: 12 on each side. Game lasted 2 and a half hours.

28 February 1863	Blackheath	0-0	Barnes	Blackheath
15:00
Note: Game played from 3 to 5.

28 April 1863	Barnes	0-2	N.N.	Barnes
			G. H. Pember; W. F. Baker
Note: Barnes (15 players): Morley, Baines, Collinge, Courteny, Elton, Gregory, Hall, Hay, Hewitt, Hives, Hudson, Innes, Roberts, Sheppard, Willis. N.N. (15 players): A. Pember, J. Baker, H. Baker, W. F. Baker, F. Bedwell, Doe, Gills, Groome, Lawson, Marryatt, Morton, G. Pember, Piggott, Renshaw, Wawn.
