= 1871–72 Barnes F.C. season =

Barnes
1871-72 season
- Captain: P. Weston
- Secretary: James Powell
- Rules: Laws of the Game (1871); Laws of the Game (1872) (after 27 February 1872)
- FA Cup: Second round
Home colours

This was the tenth season of Barnes Football Club. Barnes participated in the first season of the F.A. Cup, but were unable to progress further than the second round. The club was eliminated by Hampstead Heathens after a replay, despite playing both matches at home with a man advantage.

== FA Cup ==
11 November 1871 First round	Barnes	2-0	Civil Service	Barnes
	P. Weston, A. R. Dunnage
Note: Civil Service were able to field only eight players. "The match was throughout played in a very much more forcible than scientific manner, and the rule of no hands caused a good deal of argument [...] one of the Barnes men in particular drawing a delicate distinction between 'fisting' the ball and handling it". Weston's goal was "very flukey". Barnes (11 players): P. Weston (capt.), W. Bruce, F. C. Clarkson, W. R. Collins, A. R. Dunnage, E. C. Highton, C. J. Morice, H. E. Solly, E. T. Weston, V. Weston, R. W. Willis. Civil Service (8 players): J. H. Gifard (capt.), A. H. Bateman, W. C. Butler, H. C. Houndle, J. Kirkpatrick, C. W. A. Trollope, J. Wearne, W. H. White.

23 December 1871 Second round	Barnes	1-1	Hampstead Heathens	Barnes
	A. C. Highton / E. C. Highton (68)		Barker
Note: Game was ended by darkness after Barnes's goal. Barnes (11 players): P. Weston (capt.), A. Adams, Bruce, A. Dunnage, A. C. Highton, E. C. Highton, C. Ommanney, Squiz, Todd, E. T. Weston, L. T. Williams. Hampstead Heathens (10 players): J. P. Tatham (capt.), R. Barker, H. W. Beauchamp, C. B. Dimond, A. M. S. Erskine, H. Latham, A. Leach, H. P. Leach, R. B. Michell, S. R. Tatham.

6 January 1872 Second round (replay)	Barnes	0-1	Hampstead Heathens	Barnes
15:15			G. Leach
Note: Barnes (11 players): E. T. Weston (capt.), A. Adams, A. Dunnage, H. Ellis, J. Graham, A. C. Highton, E. C. Highton, C. Ommanney, H. Soley, C. Warren, P. Weston. Hampstead Heathens (10 players): J. P. Tatham (capt.), A. Bird, R. Barker, C. B. Dimond, A. Erskine, A. Leach, G. P. Leach, J. Marshall, R. B. Michell, S. R. Tatham.

== Friendly matches ==
21 October 1871	Charterhouse School	1-0	Barnes	Under Green, Godalming
c. 15:30	W. H. Davies
Note: Charterhouse School (11 players): G. C. Carter (capt.), W. H. Davies, W. Drew, E. F. Brown, T. P. Gandell, C. P. Paget, E. H. Parry, E. V. Ravenshaw, G. Staveley, W. Thompson, A. Williams. Barnes (10 players): P. Weston (capt.), A. Adams, W. K. Bruce, H. Ellis, J. Graham, A. C. Highton, E. C. Highton, C. J. Morice, C. Ommanney, H. E. Solly,

28 October 1871	Westminster School	1-1	Barnes	Vincent Square
	R. W. S. Vidal		Unknown
Note: Barnes "handled [the ball] and pushed in defiance of all the rules they professed to play". During the buildup to the Barnes goal, "many of the [Westminster] boys made no attempt to stop the player owing to his continual handling during the run-up". Westminster School (11 players): R. W. S. Vidal (capt.), L. P. Beaufort, J. Bruce, H. S. Jackson, R. G. F. Murphy, F. Oldham, W. S. Rawson, J. F. Reece, H. Roberts, H. A. C. Rogers, H. D. S. Vidal. Barnes: C. C. Boyle et al.

4 November 1871	Crystal Palace	1-0	Barnes	Crystal Palace
15:25	Clutton / Smith / W. M. Alport
Note: "The Barnes Club have lost since last season many of their best men". Crystal Palace (11 players): D. Allport (capt.), H. F. Abell, W. M. Allport, W. Bouch, R. W. Clutton, J. Cockerell, A. J. Heath, A. Lloyd, C. J. Morice, C. E. Smith, J. Turner; Barnes (11 players): P. Weston (capt.), Bruce, Chapman, Collins, Graham, A. C. Highton, E. C. Highton, Ommanney, Palmer, E. Weston, Williams.

25 November 1871	Royal Engineers	4-0	Barnes	Chatham
c. 15:00	G. Barker, Renny-Tailyour (3 goals)
Note: Royal Engineers (11 players): Merriman (capt.), Addison, G. Barker, Creswell, Goodwyn, Hoskyns, Marindin, Mitchell, Muirhead, Renny-Tailyour, Rich. Barnes (11 players): P. Weston (capt.), Adams, Bruce, Chapman, Colter (subst.), Dunnage, Hudson, Le Mesurier, Sobey, Warren, G. Weston.

2 December 1871	Captain's Eleven	D-D	All-comers	Barnes
Note: The all-comers numbered thirty-two.

16 December 1871	Clapham Rovers	v	Barnes	Clapham
Note: Match scheduled, but no report was found.

13 January 1872	Barnes	1-1	Clapham Rovers	Barnes
	E. C. Highton		C. E. Kolle
Note:

27 January 1872	Barnes	D-D	Royal Engineers	Barnes
Note:

3 February 1872	Barnes	0-2	Crystal Palace	Barnes
			A. Lloyd, W. M. Allport
Note: Crystal Palace had ten men; Barnes eleven.

17 February 1872	Barnes	v	Charterhouse School	Barnes
Note: Match scheduled, but no report was found.

24 February 1872	Westminster School	v	Barnes	Vincent Square
Note: Match scheduled, but no report was found.

2 March 1872	Captain's Eleven	v	All-comers	Barnes
Note: Match scheduled, but no report was found.

== Athletic Sports ==
- Date: 16 March 1872
- Venue: Field of J. Johnstone, White Hart inn, Mortlake.
- Committee: O. D. Chapman (treasurer), W. M. Chinnery, H. Ellis, F. S. Gulstone, E. C. Highton, E. C. Morley, J. Powell (secretary), D. M. Roberts, P. Weston, R. W. Willis, G. B. Yapp.
- Events: 100 yards flat race, 400 yards flat race handicap, 1320 yards flat race handicap, two miles flat face handicap, 150 yards hurdles, one mile handicap steeplechase, five miles handicap steeplechase (run 2 March), mile-and-a-half handicap walking, high jump, long jump running, vaulting
