= Barnes Football Club =

Coordinates: 51°28′30″N 0°14′13″W

Barnes
- Full name: Barnes Football Club
- Nickname: Knights
- Founded: 1862; 164 years ago
- Ground: Quintin Hogg River Pitches
- Chairman: Ranko Davidov
- Manager: Daniel Merrix
- Website: https://www.barnesfootballclub.co.uk/
Home colours

Barnes Football Club is an association football club in Barnes, London. The club had great importance in the development of the game in the nineteenth century and was the first team ever to win a match in the FA Cup.

== History ==
=== Origins ===
Two other sports, cricket and rowing, were important in the foundation of Barnes FC:

A Barnes Cricket Club, playing on Barnes Green, is recorded from 1835. In rowing, the Barnes and Mortlake Regatta took place in 1853, and annually from 1857. Barnes FC founder Ebenezer Morley took part in the 1858 and subsequent regattas, and served as the regatta's treasurer in 1860 and secretary from 1862. The regatta was organized from the White Hart public house, the same address subsequently used by the football club. According to an 1870 newspaper article, Barnes FC was "generally considered as an offshoot of the London Rowing Club". According to Barnes FC (and Football Association) secretary Robert Graham, the members of Barnes FC were "recruited from the rowing element and the noted army cramming establishments of Messrs. Baty and Inchbald". Graham added that "J. Johnston, the owner of Pretender, ... plac[ed] his field, opposite his residence, Castelnau House, at its disposal for matches and the club's athletic sports".

Both Morley himself, and his successors as FA secretary Robert Willis and Robert Graham, were keen oarsmen.

=== Date of foundation ===
There is a significant amount of evidence indicating that Barnes Football Club was founded in 1862. This includes:

- The absence of known reports of any matches prior to November 1862.
- The newspaper report of the first known match, played in November 1862, mentioning that the Barnes Club had "only [...] been in existence a short time".
- The club reporting its own foundation date as 1862 to the Football Annual in every issue from 1868 (the first year the Annual was published) until 1881 (when the club stopped reporting to the Annual altogether).

In 2005, a claim of an earlier foundation date was made by BBC sports presenter John Inverdale. Inverdale, citing unspecified "club records", wrote in The Daily Telegraph that Barnes Rugby Football Club (which Inverdale identified with Barnes Football Club) "were born" in 1839, and went on to "play fixtures against a whole mish-mash of teams of which no match results have been kept." No other writer supported this claim, and the rugby club itself, via its website, does not claim to have been founded earlier than the 1920s.

=== Early history ===
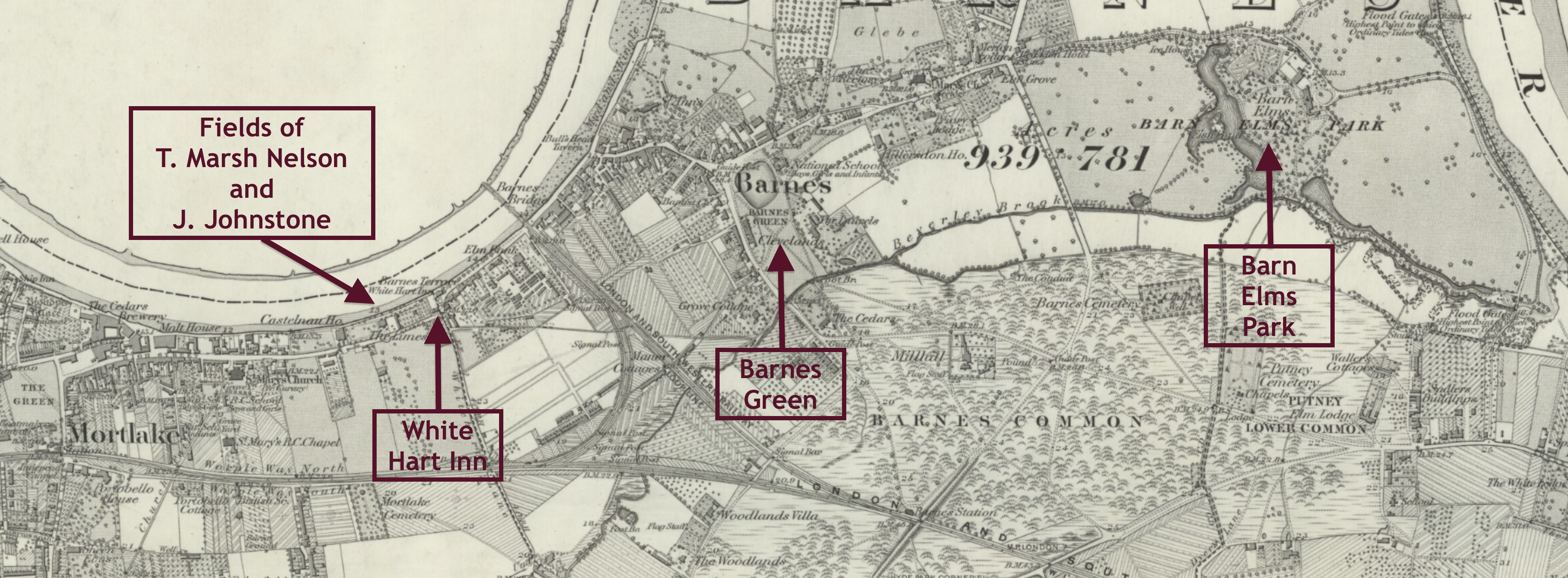
Map of locations significant to the early development of Barnes FC

Ebenezer Cobb Morley was the club's first Captain. The first known rules of the club, dating from 1862, banned running with the ball and "holding" or "hacking" an opponent. They specified that the "place for play" should be Barnes Green, and that the "balls and other property of the club" should be kept at the White Hart public house.

Barnes FC's earliest recorded result, played at Barn Elms Park against Richmond F.C. on 29 November 1862, was a 2–0 victory. A contemporary newspaper report described the club as "only having been in existence a short time", but "already numbering a large number of members, and consequently powerful". The club proceeded to draw the return match played at Richmond Green in December that year. A match against Blackheath FC on 20 December went less happily. The Blackheath club played a rugby-style game, necessitating the adoption of compromise rules. "Very weak" play by Barnes resulted in a loss by two goals to nothing, with Morley narrowly escaping being "garrotted".

Barnes FC was a founder member of the Football Association, with Morley being elected the Association's first Secretary, and consequently being responsible for drafting its first set of laws that were published in December 1863. Morley subsequently served as President of the body, and "could be called the 'father' of The [Football] Association". On 19 December 1863 Barnes participated in the first ever match under FA rules, against Richmond. The first three secretaries of the FA were all members of Barnes: Morley was succeeded by Robert Willis (1866–1867) and Robert Graham (1867–1870).

According to an undated list in the Football Association archives, probably dating from 1864, the colours of Barnes FC were "blue with white spots – a cap". In successive editions of the Football Annual (from that magazine's first publication in 1868 until the club stopped reporting in 1881), the colours of the club were consistently described as blue and white stripes or hoops.

The club took part in the first ever FA Cup in 1871–72, and was the first team ever to win a match in the tournament, on 11 November 1871 (most first-round games kicked off later that day; the only other 3pm kick-off ended 0-0). Barnes went on to compete in fourteen of the first fifteen editions of the competition, the last being in 1885–86. The club's best performance came in 1878–79, when it reached the third round before losing 2–1 to Oxford University. It was also among the ten founder members of the Surrey County Football Association, in 1877. Barnes club captain Charles Morice represented England in the first ever international association football match between Scotland and England played at Hamilton Crescent, Glasgow in 1872.

The club's greatest honour was winning the Surrey Senior Cup in 1883–84, beating Reigate Priory 3–2 in the final, at the Kennington Oval; captain R.S. Ibbs scored two of the goals from midfield, and one of the Priory goals was with almost the last kick of the game. Barnes reached the final again in 1887–88, but was forced to scratch to Lyndhurst, after a draw, because its players - mostly mercantilist stockbrokers - could not spare the time for a replay. Barnes proposed the trophy be shared, but "after a considerable debate" the Surrey FA awarded the trophy to Lyndhurst.

=== Subsequent history ===
The club's subsequent history is more sparsely documented. There are newspaper reports of a club named "Barnes" playing in local leagues during the 1930s, 1950s, and 1960s. A "History of the Football Association", published in 1953, stated:

Of the 'only and original' clubs forming The Football Association the Barnes Club alone has throughout the ages been an active and faithful member of The Football Association.

Note also that a Barnes Incogniti Football Club played a friendly match against Racing Club de France on October 27, 1900, in Levallois, a match won 3–1 by Barnes.

In 2002, Barnes Rugby Football Club claimed on its website to be the successor of Barnes FC, stating that "Barnes rugby club is one of the oldest in the country. Our earliest recorded match was November 1862 versus Richmond, played at Barn Elms.". In 2005, this claim was amplified in The Daily Telegraph by BBC sports presenter John Inverdale. Inverdale, who stated that he was "[f]or reasons that I'm not altogether clear about, ... one of a number of vice-presidents" of Barnes RFC, wrote that "in 1839, according to the club records, Barnes RFC were born, playing fixtures against a whole mish-mash of teams of which no match results have been kept."

In 2008, a much weaker version of this statement appeared on the rugby club's website, stating only that "Barnes Rugby Club is a club with a rich history and was established in Barnes in the 1920s. Although there are indeed possibilities that our earliest recorded match was in November 1862 versus Richmond and played at Barn Elms, it is from the 1920s that our true history is clear." As of 2018, similar wording remains on the current version of the rugby club's website.

== Present day ==
In June 2021, the grandchildren of ex-chairman Mr. Leslie Kilsby, Janice Kilsby and Julie Burgess, along with local enthusiasts, re-established Barnes FC. In November 2021, £4,937 was fundraised to finance the first season, with £1,395 coming from Sport England. Additional funding was raised from sponsorships with local businesses.

Ranko Davidov has taken a chairman role with a goal to develop the club into a modern sustainable community club. Mid-term plans are to earn semi-professional sports status. The club plays again under the Surrey County Football Association for the 2022–23 season. Home ground for adult team is Quintin Hogg River pitches, modern facilities with 3G Pitch, 75 seaters capacity, floodlights, scoreboard and new changing rooms and hospitality area. Youth teams play London County Saturday Youth League in Barn Elms Sport Centre. Ben Lewis is the first team manager. The Club quickly managed to achieve a 1 star FA accredited status. After finishing mid table in Surrey SE Combination League Div 2 in season 2023/24, the club moved to Kingston Premier Division (Step 8 of English football system). In season 2024/25 Barnes won Kingston and District League for a first trophy in its modern history.

The club is affiliated with Surrey FA and won the reward as Grassroots Club of the Year for 2023

== Officers ==
Season	Captain	Secretary
1862–63	Ebenezer Morley	[Unknown]
1863–64	Ebenezer Morley	Thomas Gregory
1864–65	Ebenezer Morley	Robert Willis
1865–66	Ebenezer Morley	Robert Willis
1866–67	Ebenezer Morley	Robert Willis
1867–68	Robert Willis	Robert Graham
1868–69	Robert Willis	Robert Graham
1869–70	Robert Willis	James Powell
1870–71	Robert Willis	James Powell
1871–72	P. Weston	James Powell
1872–73	Charles Morice	H. Ernest Solly
