= Peter McBride (footballer) =

Scottish footballer

Personal information
- Full name: Peter McBride
- Date of birth: 15 September 1877
- Place of birth: Ayr, Scotland
- Date of death: 3 January 1951 (aged 73)
- Place of death: Preston, England
- Position: Goalkeeper

Senior career*
Years	Team	Apps	(Gls)
1894–1896	Ayr		
1896–1912	Preston North End	442	(0)

International career
1904–1909	Scotland	6	(0)
- * Club domestic league appearances and goals

Peter McBride (15 September 1877 – 3 January 1951) was a Scottish professional footballer who played as a goalkeeper for Preston North End and the Scotland national football team.

McBride was born in Ayr, and played for Ayr F.C. until joining Preston North End on 5 December 1896, replacing Welsh international James Trainer. Preston paid Ayr £55 for the transfer, and McBride was given a weekly salary of £3. On 20 March 1901, McBride injured a shoulder playing for the Anglo-Scots in the annual trial for the Scottish team. As a result, he missed the last five games of the season with Preston – his deputy let in 15 goals in those games, the team was relegated from the First Division and the club attempted to obtain compensation from the Scottish Football Association. In the 1903–04 season McBride kept 14 clean sheets to help PNE to regain their position in the First Division, winning the Second Division title with 20 wins and 10 draws out of their 34 games.

On 9 April 1904, McBride won the first of his six international caps for Scotland. He played against England four times, including Scotland's 2–1 victory in 1906. He was also a member of the PNE side which was runners-up to Liverpool in the 1905–06 season; North End had the best defensive record.

McBride was known for his aggressive behaviour and it is reported that during one match, when the opposition's striker scored his third goal, McBride raced out of his penalty area and shook him by the throat.

During his 15-year period at Deepdale, McBride played a record 443 games for the team. Failing eyesight forced him into retirement in 1912.
