= Charles Morice =

English footballer

Charles John Morice (27 May 1850 – 17 June 1932) was an English footballer who played for England as a forward in the first international match against Scotland.

== Early life and education ==
Morice was born in London, the son of Sophia (née Levien) and Charles Walter Morice. He was educated at Harrow School.

== Football career ==
On leaving school he joined Harrow Chequers and then the Barnes club. He won his solitary England cap playing at outside left in England's first ever international match against Scotland on 30 November 1872. He was also a member of the Wanderers club.

== Business career ==
In his professional life he worked at the London Stock Exchange.

== Family ==
With his wife, Rebecca Garnett, he had a daughter, Muriel Rose Morice. Through Muriel, he is the great-grandfather of actors Edward Fox and James Fox.
