= Robert George Graham =

British sportsman

Robert George Graham (born Hinxton, Cambridgeshire, 1 January 1845, died Hampton, Middlesex, 6 April 1922) was a British sportsman and businessman.

== Early life ==
Graham was born on New Year's Day 1845, the son of the Rev. John Graham of Hinxton Vicarage, Cambridgeshire. He attended Cheltenham College between January 1861 and June 1862.

== Sportsman ==
=== Footballer ===
Graham played for Barnes Football Club between 1865 and 1869 as a forward, captaining the club in a match against Crystal Palace in January of that year. He also played for the "Surrey and Kent" team in the first inter-county football match under association rules, in November 1867. Graham captained the Surrey team in separate matches against Kent and Middlesex in 1868. In 1869, he also played for Crusaders FC.

=== Football administrator ===
Through Barnes FC and the London Rowing Club, Graham came into contact with Robert Willis, who would serve as second secretary of the Football Association from 1866 to 1867. From 1867 to 1870, Graham himself served as both secretary and treasurer of the Football Association.

The future for the FA did not look promising at this time: only ten clubs were members, resulting in low attendance at the 1867 annual meeting. During the next year, Graham attempted to increase membership by writing to every known club in the country. This increased membership to thirty by 1868, but did not prevent the association from running out of money, with the officers having to cover expenses out of their own pockets.

After his resignation as secretary in 1870, Graham continued to serve on the FA's committee from 1870 to 1871. He also served as secretary of Barnes FC in 1868. An obituary in the Athletic News described Graham as "one of those gentlemen who tackled the chaos in which football existed and from which the Football Association came into being".

=== Other sports ===
Graham was also a keen rower, competing for the London Rowing Club at the Henley Royal Regatta of 1865. He won the English pole jump championship in 1869. In 1895, he invented a captive golf-ball game, known as "Linka".

== Later life ==
Graham worked as a stockbroker and company director. He was "allowed the office of broker" by the Court of Aldermen of the City of London in March 1869. For the last 36 years of his life, he also served as volunteer captain of the fire brigade of Hampton upon Thames, where he lived. His knowledge of firefighting came from his friend Eyre Massey Shaw, first chief of the London Fire Brigade.

In 1893, his comedy Our Play was performed at the Vaudeville Theatre in London's West End, to poor reviews.

== Family ==
Graham married Alice Hackblock on 15 September 1869. The couple had two daughters, the younger of whom was prolific novelist and anti-Mormon campaigner Winifred Graham. After Robert's death, Winifred produced two books supposedly communicated by her father via automatic writing. Graham's elder sister, Helen, married Robert Willis in 1867.

== Death ==
Graham died on 6 April 1922. He was survived by his widow Alice and his two daughters.

== Works ==
- Graham, R. G. (1899). "The Early History of the Football Association". The Badminton Magazine of Sports and Pastimes. viii. London: Longmans, Green, & Co.: 75-87.
