= Clapham Common Club =

19th-century English football club

C.C.C.
- Full name: Clapham Common Club
- Nickname: C.C.C.
- Founded: 1864
- Dissolved: 1872
- Ground: Clapham Common
- Secretary: C. H. Hartung, P. V. Turner
Home colours

Clapham Common Club, usually known by its initials C.C.C., was a mid-nineteenth century amateur English football club based at Clapham Common.

== History ==
The club was active during the period between 1864 and 1871, playing both association football and codes closer to rugby football. The club was a member of the Football Association from 1864 to 1872, although it did not enter the FA Cup.

The club's first recorded match was a 2–1 win over a "scratch eleven" on 4 January 1864, the scratch eleven being made up of other members of the club. The first genuine external match followed on 16 January, a 2–0 home win against the Montague Club.

The club played the Blackheath Rugby Club under the latter's rules (similar to rugby, but with a different offside rule) in 1865, winning 4–0. The biggest win was a 6–0 win for a C.C.C. thirteen against a 20-man Clapham side; the club's most notable win was a 1–0 win over the Wanderers in a match played to Westminster School rules, helped by the Wanderers having to use substitutes (one of whom was C.C.C.'s Edward Tayloe) as only seven visiting players - albeit including Charles W. Alcock and Alexander Morten - turned up.

The last reported match was on 18 March 1871, a 0–0 draw at home to Sydenham F.C., in which the club was "represented on this occasion by an exceptionally weak team"., although the club was still active within the FA committees at this time, with captain P.V. Turner being on the committee to choose players for the unofficial internationals.

The formation of the Clapham Rovers was a factor in the decline of C.C.C.; the club's captain and secretary in 1868, John Tayloe, was captain of the Rovers in the latter's first match in 1869. In the 1869–70 season, the club only played seven matches, with three 0–0 draws, three 1–0 defeats, and scoring just the one goal, in a win over Brentwood School. By 1871, although the C.C.C. boasted 76 members, the Rovers cluld claim over 100. From 1872, two of the C.C.C. regulars were playing for the Civil Service F.C., others played for the original Crystal Palace club, and the remainder - including the Dealtry brothers, Soden, and Ker, who had played in the club's very first matches - retired from the game.

== Colours ==
Until 1870 the club listed its colours as being a black velvet cap with a red tassel and red stockings. In 1871 the club described its colours as red and black.

== Ground ==
The club played on the Clapham Common, usually finding a pitch a 5-minute walk from Clapham railway station on the London, Chatham and Dover Railway.

== See also ==
- Clapham Rovers F.C.
