= 1863–64 Barnes F.C. season =

Barnes
1863-64 season
- Captain: Ebenezer Morley
- Secretary: Thomas Gregory
- Rules: Rules of Barnes Football Club (1862)(before 19 December 1863); Laws of the Game (1863)

This was the second season of Barnes Football Club. The early part of the season included two defeats against Forest FC (later renamed Wanderers FC), the second of them a bad-tempered affair in which the rules of the game became an object of contention. On 19 December, Barnes played neighbouring Richmond F.C. in the first ever match under the newly-published laws of the Football Association; this 15-a-side clash ended in a goalless draw.

31 October 1863	Barnes	2-1	Students	Barnes
	Drake; Hewitt		Hives
Note: 11 players per side.

14 November 1863	Barnes	0-5	Forest	Barnes
15:00 (approx.)			Charles Alcock (2 goals); Pardoe; Morgan; Adams	Attendance: "A large number of spectators"
Note: 11 players per side. Match ended at 5pm.

12 December 1863	Forest	1-0	Barnes	Leytonstone
14:45	Unknown (60)
Note: The game was supposed to be 15-a-side, but only 12 played for Forest, and 13 for Barnes. "There was some talk about the rules on one or two occasions, and we regret to say some little temper displayed".

19 December 1863	Barnes	0-0	Richmond	Barnes
Note: First match played under the rules of the Football Association. 15 players a side. Game lasted 90 minutes. Barnes had six "tries at goal", but missed all of them.

23 January 1864	Barnes	2-1	Mr. Greaves's Eleven	Barnes
15:00	Drake; Hay		Greaves (~60)	Attendance: "Many of the fair sex"
Note: 11 a side. Barnes' eleventh man did not arrive until the team was trailing to Greaves's goal. Hay's winning goal for Barnes was scored by a free-kick after a touch-down, which was "punted". Game ended at 16:45.

30 January 1864	N.N.	3-0	Barnes	Kilburn
	W. Baker; W. De Pothonier (2 goals)
Note: N.N. (15 players): Pember (capt.), A. Baker, H. Baker, J. Baker, W. Baker, Collins, Daly, De Pothonier, Giles, Lendrum, Mitchell, Morten, Morton, Renshaw, Wawn. Barnes (15 players): Morley (capt.), Beresford, Bloxam, Elton, Gesham, Hay, Innes, Lenchars, M'Calmont, Massendero, Moore, Roberts, Sheppard, Waller, Willis.

27 February 1864	Barnes	2-1	Crystal Palace	Barnes
	Drake; Mossenden		Sharland
Note: 15-a-side. Game lasted 105 minutes. Barnes: Drake, Greenhill, Hay, Mossenden, O'Leary, Waller, et al. Crystal Palace: Turner (capt.), Cutbill, Desborough, Sharland, et al.

5 March 1864	Barnes	1-1	N.N.	Barnes
	Innes (45)		Baker (75)
Note: 12-a-side (originally intended to be 15-a-side).
