= Ebenezer Cobb Morley =

English sportsman (1831–1924)

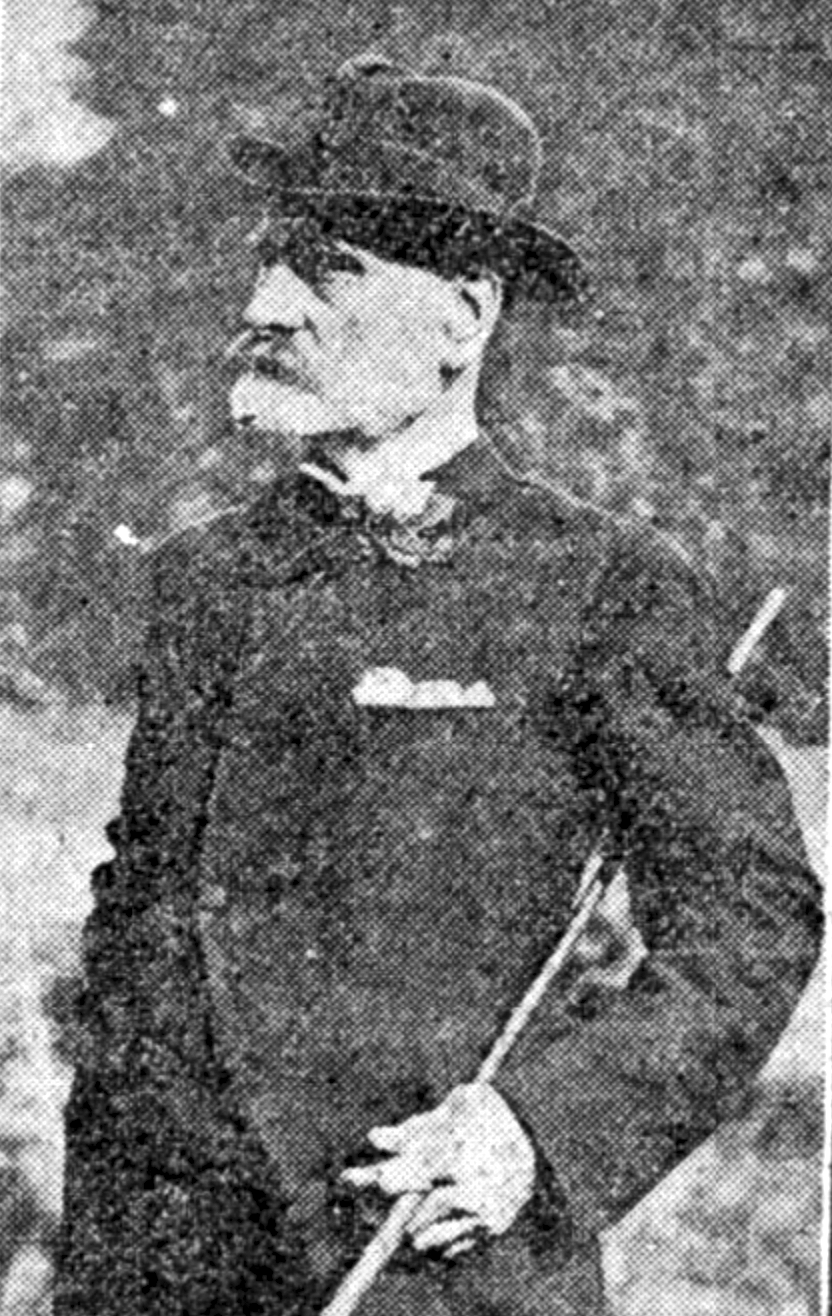
- Photograph published at the time of the Football Association's 50th anniversary (1913).
- Born: 16 August 1831; Kingston upon Hull, East Riding of Yorkshire, England
- Died: 20 November 1924 (aged 93); Richmond, Surrey, England
- Resting place: Barnes, Richmond, London, England
- Occupation: Solicitor
- Known for: Secretary and President of the Football Association
- Spouse: Frances Bidgood
- Parent(s): Ebenezer Morley and Hannah Maria

Ebenezer Cobb Morley (16 August 1831 – 20 November 1924) was an English sportsman. He is regarded as one of the fathers of the Football Association (FA) and modern football.

== Early life ==
Morley was born at 10 Garden Square, Princess Street in Hull to the Reverend Ebenezer Morley, a nonconformist minister, and his wife Hannah (née Cobb). He lived in the city until he was 22.

Morley qualified as a lawyer in 1854. In 1858 he moved to the London suburb of Barnes to practise as a solicitor in the capital.

== Sporting career ==
=== Football ===
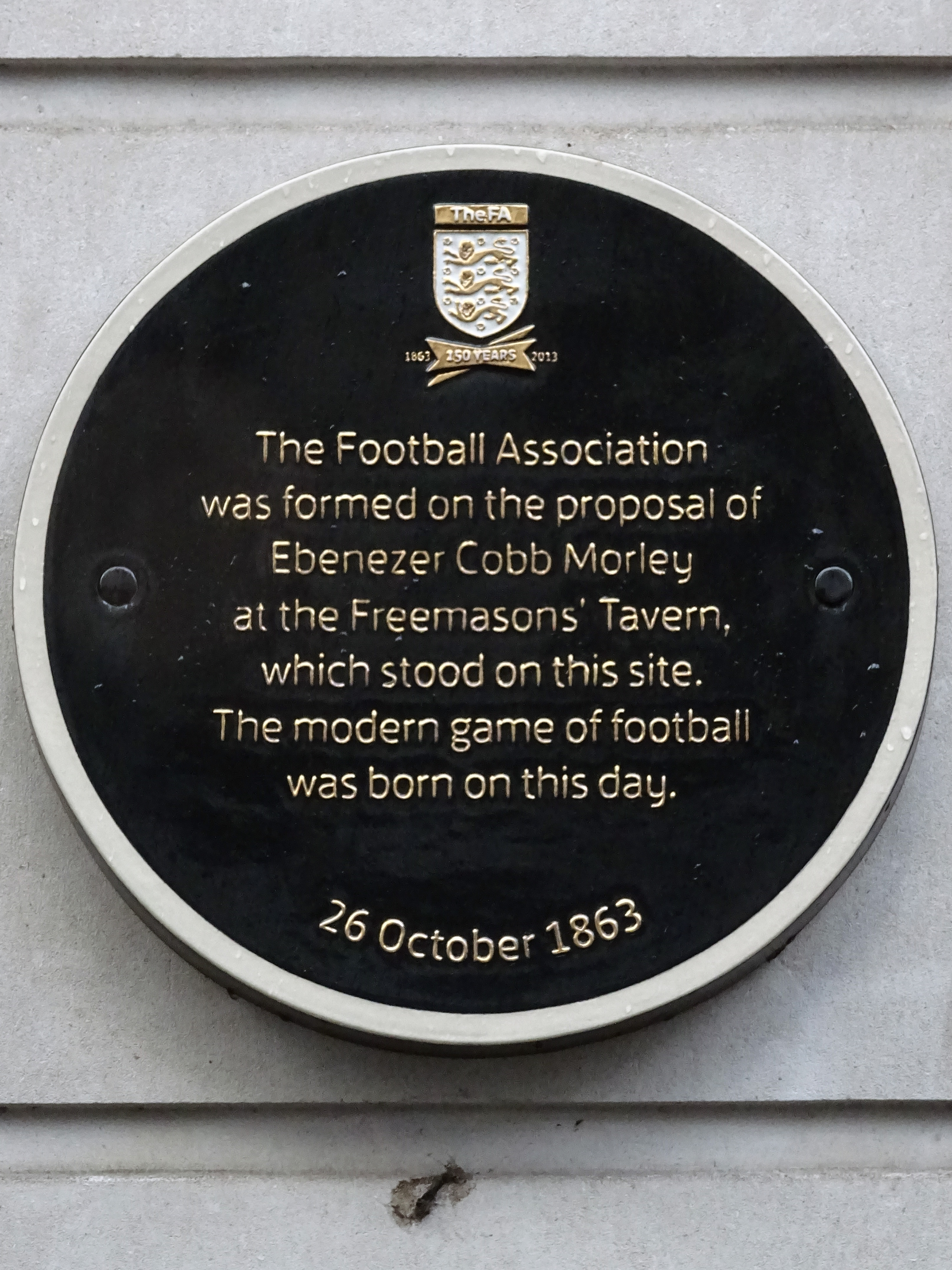
Commemorative plaque at Freemasons' Tavern, London

Morley founded Barnes Football Club in 1862, and served as its captain until 1867.

The Barnes club played its first recorded game, a 2–0 victory, against Richmond F.C., on 29 November 1862. A match the following month against Blackheath FC went less happily: the Blackheath club played a rugby-style game, necessitating the adoption of compromise rules. "Very weak" play by Barnes resulted in a loss by two goals to nothing, with Morley narrowly escaping being "garrotted".

In 1863, Morley wrote to Bell's Life newspaper proposing a governing body for the sport, with the power to set common rules. This led to the first meeting of the FA at Freemasons' Tavern, on 26 October 1863. At this meeting, Morley was elected the first secretary of the association.

=== Creation of the FA's 1863 Laws ===
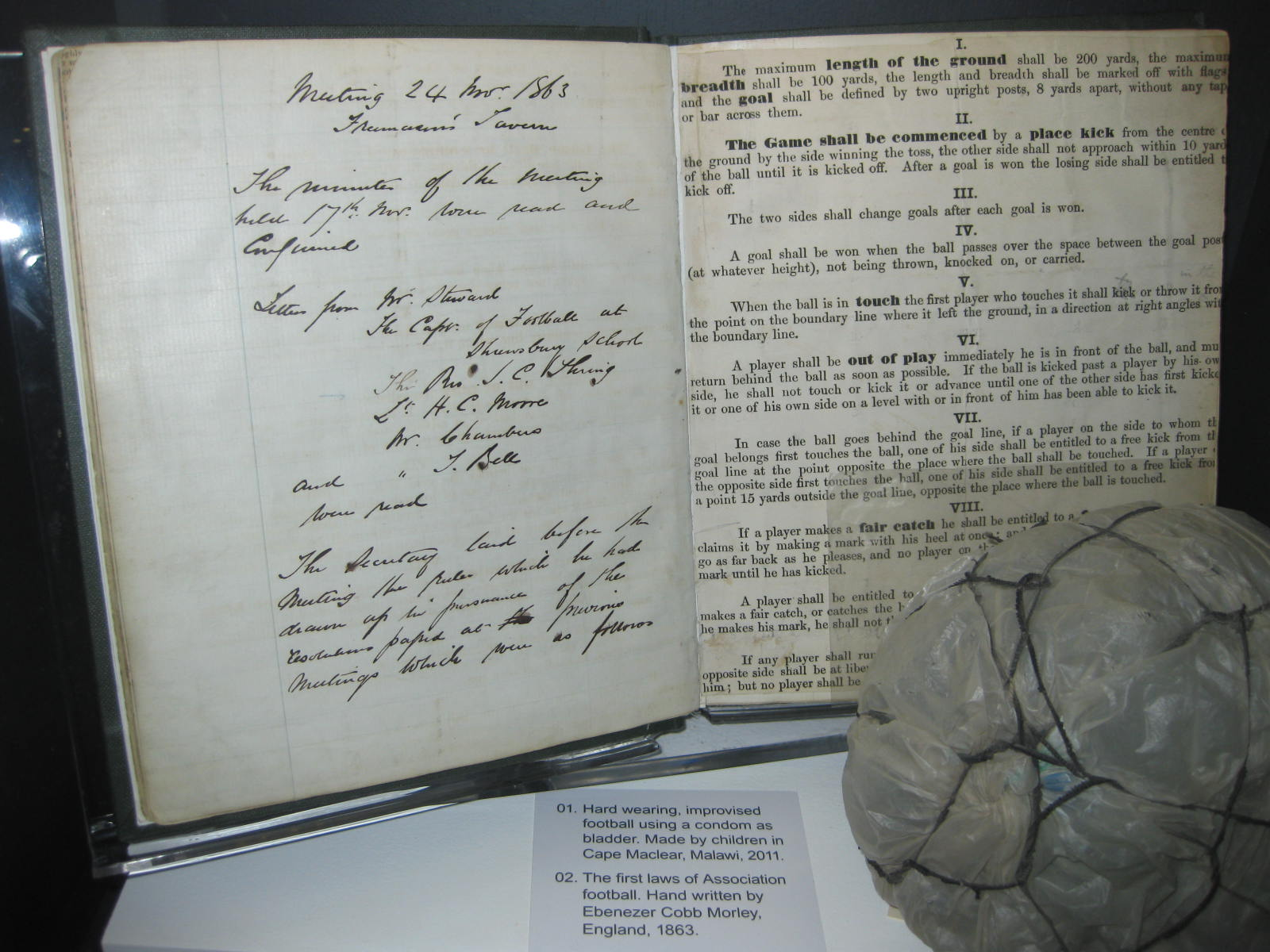
An early draft of the original hand-written 'Laws of the Game' drawn up on behalf of The Football Association by Ebenezer Cobb Morley in 1863 on display at the National Football Museum, Manchester.

At this time, some football clubs followed the example of Rugby School by allowing the ball to be carried in the hands, with players allowed to "hack" (kick in the shins) opponents who were carrying the ball. Other clubs forbade both practices. During the meetings to draw up the FA laws, there was an acrimonious division between the "hacking" and "non-hacking" clubs. An FA meeting of 17 November 1863 discussed this question, with the "hacking" clubs predominating. A further meeting was scheduled in order to finalise ("settle") the laws, based on the draft created by Morley in his role as secretary.

At this crucial 24 November meeting, the "hackers" were again in a narrow majority. During the meeting, however, Morley brought the delegates' attention to a recently published set of football laws from Cambridge University which banned carrying and hacking. Discussion of the Cambridge rules, and suggestions for possible communication with Cambridge on the subject, served to delay the final "settlement" of the laws to a further meeting, on 1 December. A number of representatives who supported rugby-style football did not attend this additional meeting, resulting in hacking and carrying being banned in the laws that were published later that month.

=== Subsequent activity with the FA ===
Morley played in the first ever match under FA rules, for Barnes against Richmond in December 1863. On 2 January 1864, Morley led his "Secretary's Side" to defeat against the "President's Side" in a friendly match at Battersea Park to test out the new laws.

He continued to serve as FA secretary until 1866. At that year's annual meeting, Morley resigned as FA secretary, citing the demands of business. He also objected to FA member clubs playing under any other rules, and made an unsuccessful proposal to abolish the offside law.

Even though he was no longer FA secretary, Morley continued to be involved in football. He remained captain of Barnes FC, continued to serve on the FA's committee, and played for the "London" (FA) team in the London v Sheffield match held on 31 March 1866, scoring a goal.

By the time of the next FA annual meeting, in February 1867, the Association's future looked bleak. Membership had fallen to ten clubs, and founding president Arthur Pember needed to be replaced. Morley volunteered for the role, and was duly elected by the few club representatives in attendance.

During the next year, the secretary Robert Graham attempted to increase membership by writing to every known club in the country. This increased membership to thirty by 1868, but did not prevent the association from running out of money, with the officers having to cover expenses out of their own pockets.

Morley continued to serve as president until 1874, presiding over the birth of the FA Cup and a general increase in the popularity and influence of the Association. He was the first man to present the FA Cup, in 1872.

When the FA celebrated its 50th anniversary in 1913, Morley, the most prominent founder of the association who was still living, was a notable guest at the festivities. He was presented with a silver cigar-case at a dinner held at the King's Hall, Holborn in central London.

=== Rowing ===
Morley was also active in the sport of rowing. Immediately upon moving to Barnes in 1858, he participated in the Barnes and Mortlake Regatta of that year, served as the treasurer of the Regatta in 1860, and as secretary from 1862 to 1870. Morley was associated with the London Rowing Club from 1860. In 1864, he competed as a member of that club's eight in the Grand Challenge Cup at Henley.

Morley continued to row long after he had ceased his work with the Football Association. In 1913, it was reported that the octogenarian was still "sculling daily in his well-known boat".

=== Fox-hunting ===
Morley was also a keen fox hunter, keeping his own pack of beagles.

== Professional career ==
Morley worked as a solicitor, handling such matters as mortgages and wills.

== Political activity ==
Morley was the agent of the Radical Member of Parliament Donald Nicoll, who represented the constituency of Frome from 1857 to 1859. Following Nicoll's defeat in the 1859 United Kingdom general election, Morley was caught up in a controversy over a petition, later withdrawn, to have the election result overturned because of "bribery, treating, and undue influence".

== Public office ==
Morley served on Surrey County Council for Barnes (1903–1919). In 1906, he was appointed a Justice of the Peace.

== Family ==
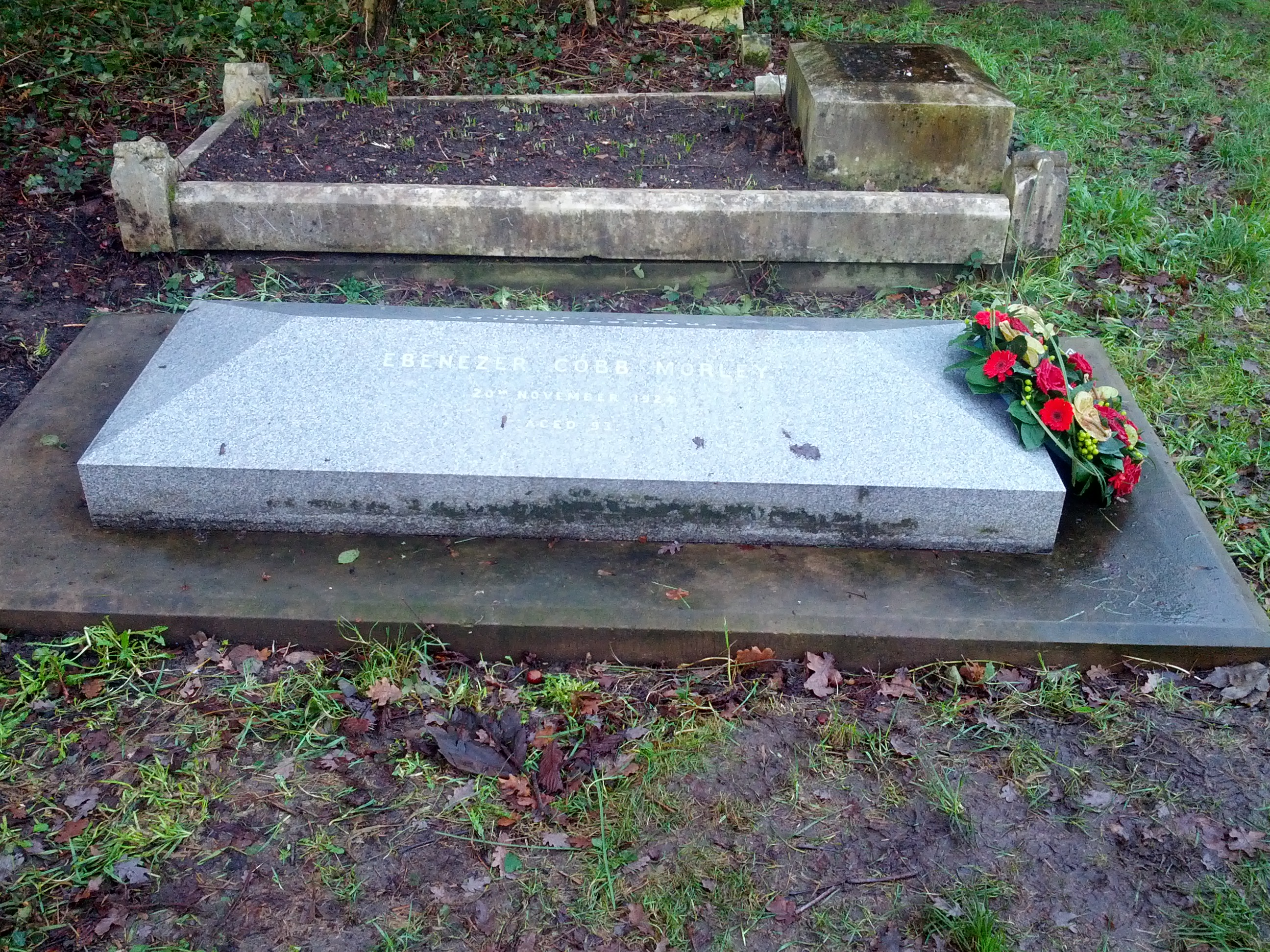
The grave of Ebenezer Cobb Morley in Barnes Cemetery, with a wreath commemorating 150 years of the FA.

Morley's wife, Frances, died of pneumonia in 1911. Morley himself succumbed to the same condition in 1924. He was buried in Barnes Cemetery, a now abandoned graveyard on Barnes Common, Barnes. He had no children.

== Legacy ==
"The importance of the 1863 FA Minute Book cannot be underestimated. Without it, quite simply, the world would be without its most popular sport."

— Greg Dyke, Chairman of The Football Association, 2013.

The house at which Morley created the first draft of the FA's laws (No 26 The Terrace) carried a blue plaque to Morley. It subsequently collapsed in November 2015 during building work.

Morley was the subject of a Google Doodle on 16 August 2018, the 187th anniversary of his birth.
