= Robert Watson Willis =

British sportsman (1843–1892)

Robert Watson Willis (26 July 1843 – 16 January 1892) was a British sportsman. He served as the second secretary of the Football Association from 1866 to 1867, succeeding Ebenezer Morley. He also served on the FA's committee from 1867 to 1872.

Like Morley, Willis was a member of Barnes Football Club, and took part in the historic London v. Sheffield match of 1866. He served as secretary to the Barnes Club from 1864 to 1867, and as captain of the club from 1867 to 1870. Morley described him as "a warm admirer of the game and an excellent footballer".

Willis was also a keen oarsman, competing in a pair with fellow footballer (and brother-in-law) Robert Graham, who succeeded him as FA secretary in 1867.

== Career ==
Willis worked in the wine import industry, with a special interest in Spain. He became a partner of Peter Domecq and Co., a sherry importer, in 1872. He later became a founding director of the Union Bank of Spain and England. Willis retired from the business in 1890.

== Family ==
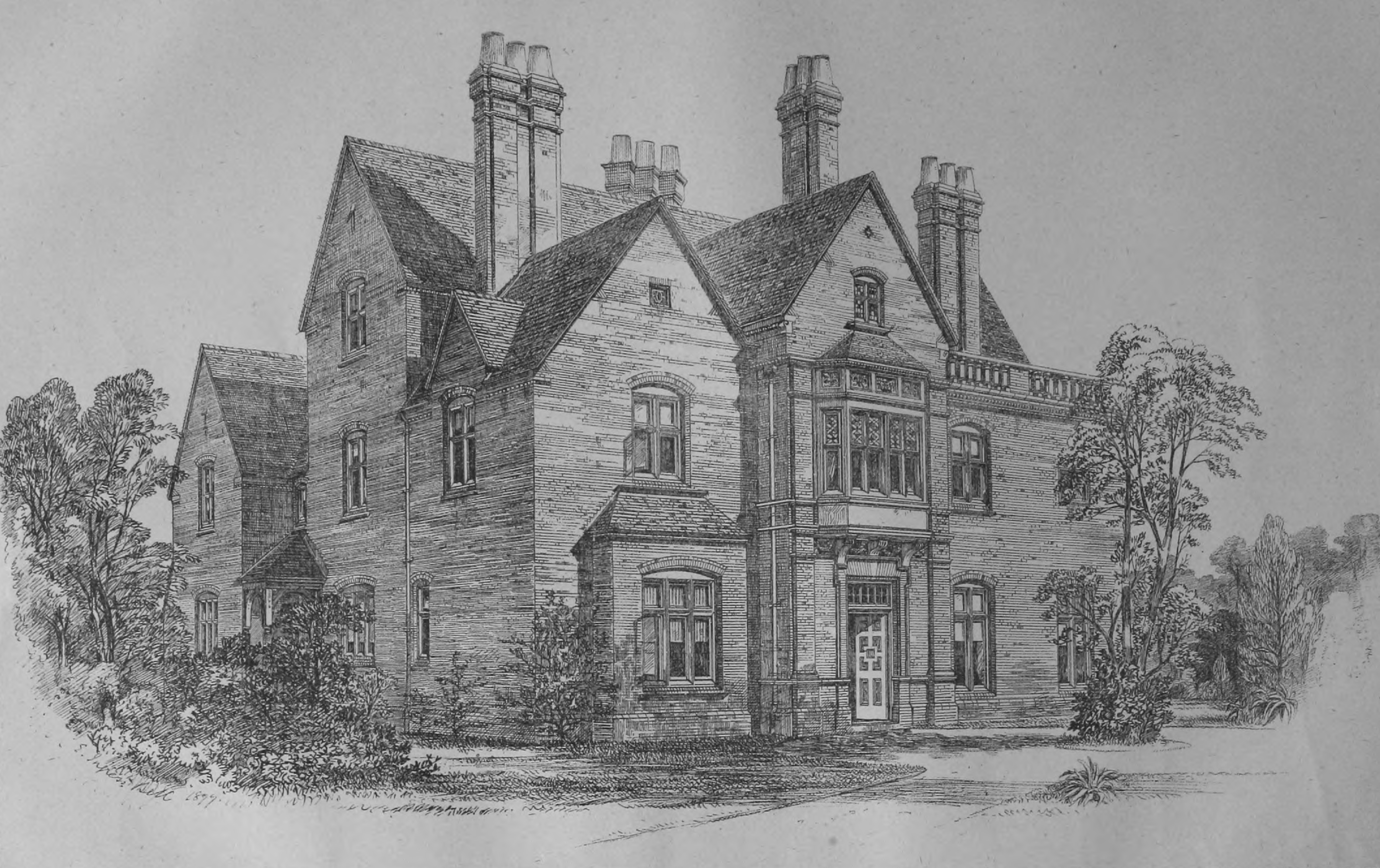
Hinxton House

Willis was the son of eminent Scottish physician Robert Willis. He married Helen Graham, elder sister of his colleague and teammate Robert Graham (also a stockbroker and volunteer fire brigade captain at Hampton upon Thames, where he lived, and father of the writer Winifred Graham) on 28 August 1867. The family later lived in Hinxton House, East Sheen, whose name reflected the village of Hinxton, Cambridgeshire, where Helen spent her childhood. The house was built for the family shortly before 1877.

Willis died on 16 January 1892, at the age of 48. He was survived by his wife Helen and five children.
