= William Merriman =

British Army officer & goalkeeper (1838-1917)

Colonel William Merriman CIE (2 April 1838 – 11 March 1917) was a British officer in the Royal Engineers who played as a goalkeeper in three FA Cup Finals, winning the cup in 1875.

== Family and education ==
Merriman was born at 13 Young Street, Kensington, London on 2 April 1838^{a}, the eighth of nine children of Dr John Merriman (1800–1881) and his wife Caroline née Jones (1800–1870), and was baptised at St Mary Abbots Church, Kensington on 25 May 1838. His father, grandfather John (1774–1839) and uncle James Nathaniel (1806–1854) were all physicians to HM Queen Victoria.

Merriman was educated at Kensington School, before attending Addiscombe Military Seminary (where officers were trained for service with the army of the East India Company) in 1856.

== Military career ==
He joined the East India Company's Royal Engineers with the rank of ensign on 12 December 1856 "during the period of his being placed under the command of Colonel Sandham, of the Royal Engineers, at Chatham, for Field Instructions in the art of Sapping and Mining", and was promoted to Lieutenant on 13 August 1858. He served as an adjutant at Poona in India from 1858 to 1866, before returning to Chatham as a fieldwork instructor. Merriman was promoted to captain on 31 December 1868 and to major on 13 March 1874. Between 1875 and 1881, he was District Officer at Colchester.

He was promoted to lieutenant colonel on 1 July 1881, and then saw active service in South Africa, before spending the remainder of his military career in India, where he was involved with the coastal defences in West India from 1882. On 1 July 1885, he was promoted to colonel, becoming chief engineer on the staff of Sir George Greaves, the Commander in Chief at Bombay, in 1892, before retiring the following year.

On 1 January 1890, Merriman was created a Companion of the Order of the Indian Empire (CIE) in the New Year Honours list, for "services involving the coast defences in India and Aden".

== Sporting career ==
Merriman was a keen all-round sportsman and participated in athletics, rowing, golf, hunting and shooting as well as cricket and football. He represented the Royal Engineers at cricket, playing regularly between 1869 and 1879.

In India, Merriman was vice-commodore of the Royal Bombay Yacht Club and a steward at the Bombay Turf Club.

=== Football career ===
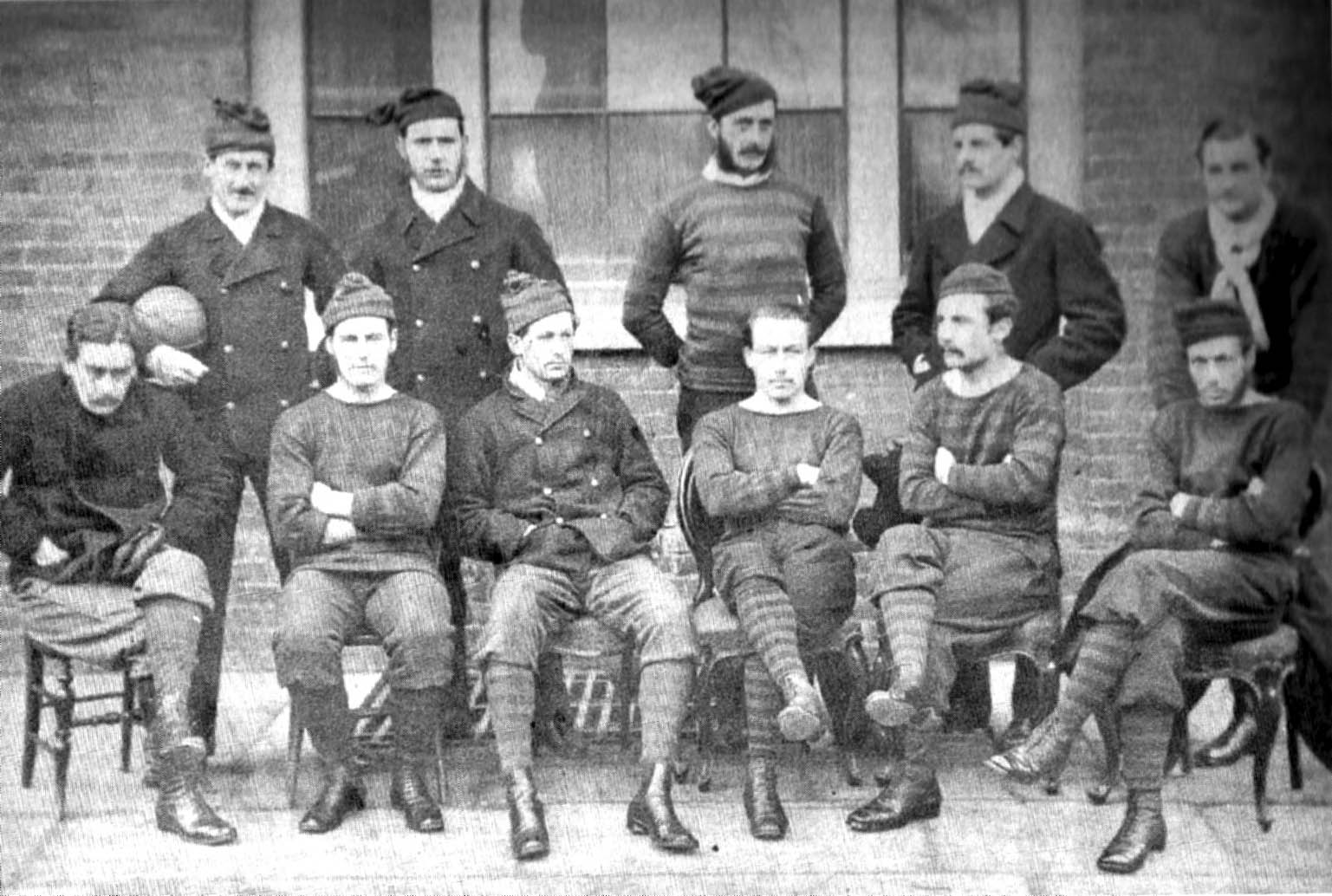
The Royal Engineers team of 1872. Eight of these players played in the first FA Cup Final. Merriman is standing first on the left

Merriman represented the Addiscombe Military Seminary at football in 1856, before his service in India. During his period of service in England between 1867 and 1881, he was a regular member of the Royal Engineers football team, generally playing in goal. Contemporaries described him as "the most popular of football chiefs", "as a goalkeeper (he) is never found wanting", "one of the very best goalkeepers of the day, plucky, cool and difficult to pass" and "always doing the right thing at the right time". The Royal Engineers Journal described Merriman as "an uncommonly good goal-keeper, a fact not infrequently mentioned in the records of matches".

In November 1871, the Royal Engineers were among fifteen teams who entered the inaugural FA Cup competition, and were allocated a home match in the first round against Reigate Priory. Reigate Priory, however, withdrew from the competition, sending the Engineers through to the next round on a walkover. In the second round, the Engineers beat Hitchin 5–0 on 10 January 1872. At the quarter-final stage, the Engineers beat Hampstead Heathens 3–0, setting up a semi-final against Crystal Palace which was won 3–0 after a replay.

The first FA Cup Final was played at Kennington Oval on 16 March 1872 between the Royal Engineers and Wanderers, the top amateur club of the day. Wanderers took the lead fifteen minutes into the game when Morton Betts opened the scoring from an acute angle after Robert Vidal's long dribble. After twenty minutes Alcock put the ball past Merriman in the Engineers' goal, but the goal was disallowed because Charles Wollaston had handled the ball. Wanderers continued to exert further pressure on the Engineers' goal and only Merriman's skill was able to prevent them from increasing their lead. Despite a late rally from the Engineers, Wanderers were able to hold on to their lead and the game ended in a 1–0 victory in their favour.

Merriman's performance in goal was described by The Field as "perfect". The Sportsman reported that "more than one (attack) would doubtless have been successful but for the extremely efficient goal-keeping of Capt Merriman". The Field further commented that "so resolute was the front offered by Capt Merriman, the goal keeper of the Sappers, and so judicious his defence, that further reverses were averted for his side" and "to him alone was due the preservation of the military fortress from further surrenders".

In the following year, the Royal Engineers were eliminated from the FA Cup in the third round following a 1–0 defeat by Oxford University, but in 1874 they easily reached the final, with victories in the early rounds of 5–0 and 7–0 over Brondesbury and Maidenhead respectively. In the final, played at Kennington Oval on 14 March 1874, the Engineers faced Oxford University. The university won the match 2–0 with early goals from Charles Mackarness and Frederick Patton. For the first goal, Merriman was unsighted when the ball was put past him from a melee after a corner. A match report by the Royal Engineers' secretary commented: "it was rather disgusting losing a goal like this for anyone almost could have stopped, but naturally enough each thought it safer to leave it to the goal-keeper who could use his hands to it; unfortunately, however, owing to the crowd he did not see it and thus the ball went quietly through the posts". For the second goal, the Royal Engineers' secretary reported that "Ottaway and Maddison failed to elude the Sappers' goal keeper who this time determined to die hard; his efforts were to no purpose for Patton coming to the rescue, shot the ball through the posts".

The Engineers reached the FA Cup Final for the third time in four years in 1875 but only after a hard semi-final against Oxford University, with a 1–1 draw followed by a 1–0 victory in the replay, achieved by a goal in extra time from Capt Henry Renny-Tailyour. In the final, played on 13 March 1875 at The Oval, the Engineers met the Old Etonians. The match was played in a strong gale and the Engineers spent most of the match against the gale, with the rules requiring ends to be changed after each goal. Alexander Bonsor scored for the Old Boys after 30 minutes; The Sportsman reported that "the ball was so skilfully handled by Bonsor, with the proper allowance for the wind, that it went between the posts before Major Merriman could divert its course". Capt Renny-Tailyour scored an equaliser within five minutes and, later in the match, Merriman just managed to prevent Arthur Kinnaird scoring the winning goal and, despite extra time being played, the match ended 1–1. The replay was three days later; although the Engineers were able to field the same eleven as in the first match, the Etonians had to make four changes, losing the match 2–0, with both the Engineers' goals scored by Capt Renny-Tailyour. At the third attempt, Merriman (aged 36 years 348 days) and the Royal Engineers won their first, and only, FA Cup Final.

In 1875–76, the Engineers defeated High Wycombe 15–0 in the first round of the cup, before going out 3–1 to Swifts, and in the following year they were eliminated in a fourth round defeat by Cambridge University.

Merriman served on the FA committee between 1874 and 1877.

=== Tributes ===
In the September 1896 edition of The Sapper, a memoir was published praising Merriman's contribution to sport at the Royal Engineers:

Who does not remember the Major Merriman of twenty years ago who was never more delighted than when organizing sports – football, cricket and other matches – for the sapper's pleasure? I can see him now, in winter time, coming out on the Barrack Square with a football under his arm and giving a mighty kick, shouting out for the men to come and join him, and in less time than I can write it, the barracks would be swarming and there would be rare fun.

== Personal life ==
Merriman married Emily Jane Anna Elizabeth Somerset at St Stephen's Church, South Kensington on 13 February 1872. Her brother, Arthur, played first-class cricket for Sussex. The couple had four children:

- Ethel Fitzroy Merriman (1873–1960)
- Arthur Drummond Nairne Merriman (1876–1966)
- Blanche Merriman (1878–1968)
- Dorothy Gladys Merriman (1880–1968)

William Merriman died at the family home at Creffield House, Gray Road, Colchester, Essex on 11 March 1917, aged 78.

== Note ==
- ^a The family home at 13 Young Street, Kensington was later the home of the novelist, William Makepeace Thackeray and the poet, G. B. O'Neill.

== Bibliography ==
- Collett, Mike (2003). The Complete Record of the FA Cup. Sports Books. ISBN 1-899807-19-5.
- Gibbons, Philip (2001). Association Football in Victorian England – A History of the Game from 1863 to 1900. Upfront Publishing. ISBN 1-84426-035-6.
- Harrison (1905). The India List and India Office List.
- Warsop, Keith (2004). The Early F.A. Cup Finals and the Southern Amateurs. Soccer Data. ISBN 1-899468-78-1.
