= George William Addison =

English footballer (1849–1937)

Lieut-Colonel George William Addison (18 September 1849 – 8 November 1937) was an English soldier who played for the Royal Engineers in the 1872 and 1874 FA Cup Finals.

== Family and education ==
Addison was born at Chestnut Cottage, Manningham, near Bradford, Yorkshire on 18 September 1849, the first son of George Addison (1816–1874) and his wife, Jane née Orr (1824–1916). His father was described on the 1851 Census as a "worsted spinner". George junior was baptised at the Cathedral Church of St Peter in Bradford on 15 December 1849.

Addison was educated at Cheltenham College between January 1863 and December 1866, followed by the Royal Military Academy, Woolwich from 1867 to 1869.

== Football career ==
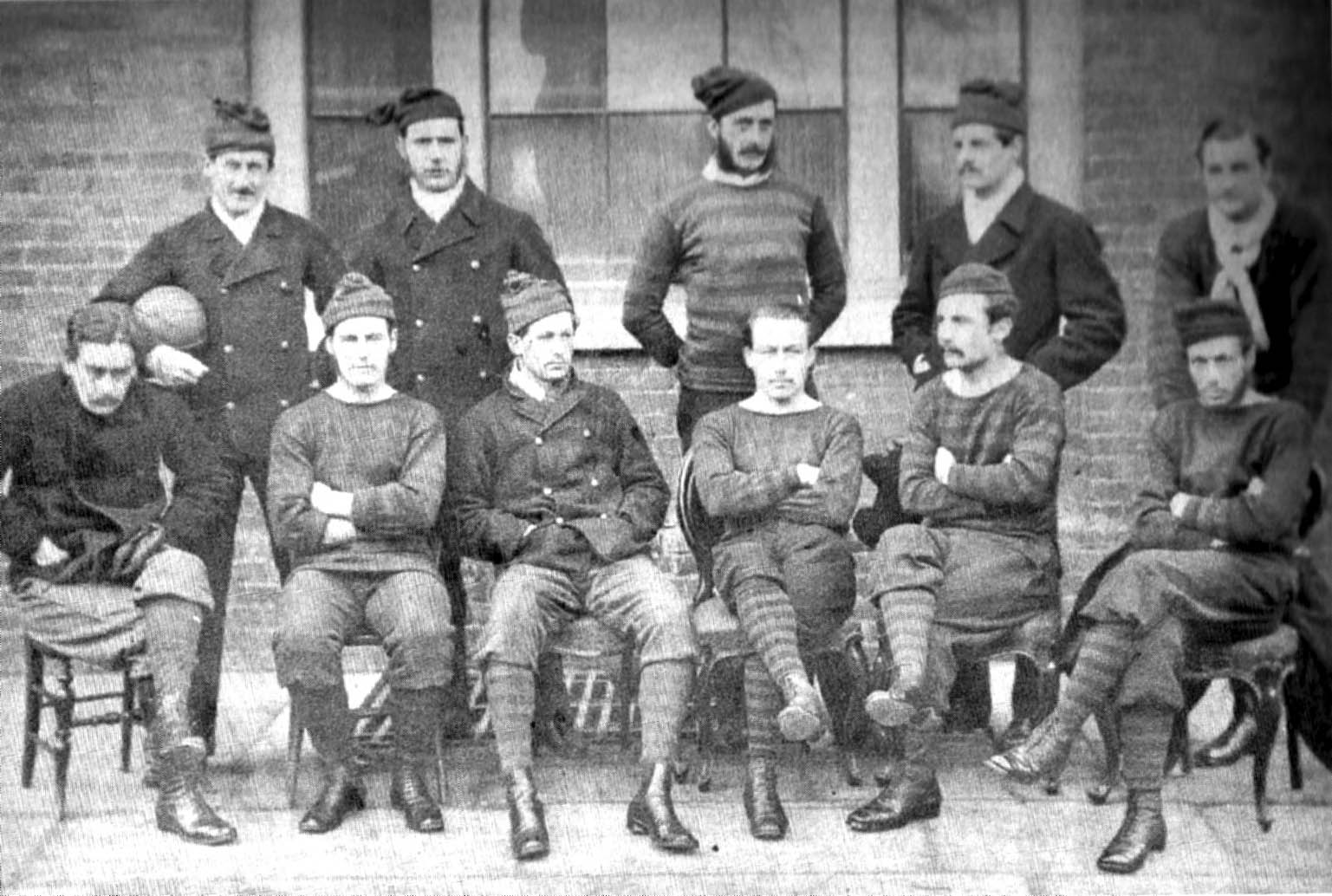
The Royal Engineers team of 1872. Eight of these players played in the first FA Cup Final. Addison is standing fourth from the left

Addison played football for Cheltenham College and RMA, Woolwich before joining the Royal Engineers. He generally played as a full back and made up a "formidable" defensive partnership firstly with A. G. Goodwyn and then with G. C. Onslow during the Engineers' peak years, being described as "a very sound back" and "playing beautifully at (the) back".

In November 1871, the Royal Engineers were among fifteen teams who entered the inaugural FA Cup competition; after victories over Hitchin (5–0), Hampstead Heathens (3–0) and Crystal Palace (3–0 after a replay), the Engineers met Wanderers, the top amateur club of the day, in the first FA Cup Final, played at Kennington Oval on 16 March 1872, which the Engineers lost 1–0, to a goal from Morton Betts.

In the following year, the Royal Engineers were eliminated from the FA Cup in the third round following a 1–0 defeat by Oxford University, but in 1874 they easily reached the final, with victories in the early rounds of 5–0 over Brondesbury (when Addison scored one of the five goals) and 7–0 over Maidenhead. In the final, played at Kennington Oval on 14 March 1874, the Engineers faced Oxford University. The university won the match 2–0 with early goals from Charles Mackarness and Frederick Patton.

Addison was also a keen cricketer, playing for the Royal Engineers between 1870 and 1879.

== Military career ==
Addison graduated from RMA, Woolwich and joined the Royal Engineers as a Lieutenant on 7 July 1869. He was based at Chatham until January 1872, before spending a year at Brighton, returning to Chatham in April 1873. While at Brighton, he was engaged on the construction of the grand magazines at Newhaven Fort.

Between November 1875 and August 1877, he was engaged in the torpedo service in Malta, commanding the 3rd Section of the 33rd Company, Royal Engineers, before being appointed aide-de-camp to Major-General Thomas Gallwey, the Inspector General of Fortifications in August 1880. Promoted to Captain on 7 July 1881, he remained with the Inspector General, becoming Aide-de-Camp to Gallwey's successor, Major-General Sir Andrew Clarke until December 1882.

In December 1882, he was appointed as secretary to the Royal Engineers Committee, before becoming assistant Private Secretary to the Secretary of State for War, W. H. Smith in August 1885 until the appointment of Viscount Cranbrook to replace Smith in January 1886.

Between 1886 and 1894, Addison worked with the Royal Engineers on telegraphs, joining the 2nd Telegraph Battalion in September 1889, having been promoted to Major on 1 April 1888.

Addison was assigned to the Board of Trade in July 1894, working on telegraph and general electrical development until his retirement on 4 October 1899, having received his final promotion to Lieutenant-Colonel on 29 March 1895.

=== Railway accident investigations ===
While with the Board of Trade, Addison was often appointed as an inspector on investigations into railway accidents, especially where the cause was attributed to signal failure.

In May 1895, he reported on an accident at New Station, Leeds on 23 March when a light locomotive of the London & North Western Railway collided with a North Eastern Railway train. He attributed the blame to "great carelessness on the part of the driver of the light engine", adding that "the present arrangement of the signals is not satisfactory".

On 1 September 1897, an Eastbourne to Tunbridge Wells train crashed at Tooth's Bank, between Heathfield and Mayfield. The locomotive ('D1' Class tank No. 297 Bonchurch) and several carriages left the track and fell down an embankment, resulting in the death of the driver, James McKenly, and injuries to the fireman and 30 passengers. At the inquiry, Lt. Col. Addison reported that the main cause of the accident was excessive speed as the driver was attempting to make up lost time to make a connection at Groombridge. The track itself was in poor shape with many rotten sleepers and "curves having irregular elevation" which contributed to the accident. Following the inquiry, much of the track was relaid and the train scheduling was altered.

On 13 July 1898, a Belfast to Larne train overran signals at Larne Town station and collided with a train of empty coaches, resulting in extensive damage to both trains. Investigating the accident, Lt. Col. Addison found that "lapses routinely occurred in working the block system and signals". As a result, Larne Town station was completely resignalled and the section to Larne Harbour section was equipped with tablet instruments.

== Guinness ==
Following his retirement in October 1899, Addison joined the Guinness company as the personal assistant to the 1st Earl of Iveagh. He was appointed a trustee of the Guinness Trust and, in 1903, its successor, the Iveagh Trust.

In June 1906, Addison represented the trust at a ceremony to formally hand over the new Iveagh Markets to Dublin Corporation. He retired from the trust in 1927.

== Wife and children ==
On 30 June 1875, Addison married Caroline Augusta Stevenson (1850–1938) at St Stephen's Church, South Kensington. The couple had six children:

- George Henry (1876–1964)
- Violet Florence (1877–1978)
- Arthur Mervyn (1879–1962)
- Gladys Ethel (1883–1974)
- Audrey Mildred (1884–1981)
- Muriel (1885–1985)

George Henry Addison followed in his father's footsteps, joining the Royal Engineers and achieving the rank of Lieutenant-Colonel, and being decorated CB, CMG, DSO. In 1947, he married Mrs. Winifred Legard, whose father, the late Sir William George Morris KCMG, CB had played for the Royal Engineers in the 1878 FA Cup Final. She was the widow of Col. Alfred Digby Legard CBE (1878–1939), who played cricket for Yorkshire from 1904 to 1910, and served with the King's Royal Rifle Corps.

Arthur Mervyn Addison served as a Major in the Royal Field Artillery in the First World War, and married Olive Edwards (née Donaldson; 1885–1957). By her first husband, Ivo Edwards (1881–1947), she was the mother of Thelma Edwards (1907–1971), who married the Second World War flying ace, Douglas Bader. Arthur and Olive's son, John (1920–1998) was a composer of film and TV scores.

George William Addison died at 16 Ashburn Place, South Kensington on 8 November 1937.

== Bibliography ==
- Collett, Mike (2003). The Complete Record of the FA Cup. Sports Books. ISBN 1-899807-19-5.
- Gibbons, Philip (2001). Association Football in Victorian England – A History of the Game from 1863 to 1900. Upfront Publishing. ISBN 1-84426-035-6.
- Warsop, Keith (2004). The Early F.A. Cup Finals and the Southern Amateurs. Soccer Data. ISBN 1-899468-78-1.
