= Darvell =

Darvell is a surname. Notable people with the surname include:

- Bruce Darvell (1931–2005), English cricketer
- Roger Darvell (1931–2014), English footballer
- Sydney Darvell (1874–1944), Welsh footballer

== See also ==
- Darvell Huffman (born 1967), former American football player
- Darvall (surname)
