= Henry Olivier =

English footballer (1850–1935)

Personal information
- Full name: Henry Dacres Olivier
- Date of birth: 22 October 1850
- Place of birth: Potterne, Wiltshire, England
- Date of death: 30 March 1935 (aged 84)
- Place of death: Winchfield, Hampshire, England
- Position: Forward

Senior career*
Years	Team	Apps	(Gls)
1871–1875	Royal Engineers		
- * Club domestic league appearances and goals

Henry Dacres Olivier (22 October 1850 – 30 March 1935) was a British Army officer in the Royal Engineers, and footballer who played as a forward.

== Early life ==
Born in Wiltshire to the Rev Henry Olivier and his wife Anne (née Arnould), Olivier was educated at Haileybury College, which played the rugby football code, and was commissioned as a lieutenant in the Royal Engineers in March 1872, although the commission was back-dated to 15 December 1871. One of his fellow cadets was P. G. von Donop, who was also a standout footballer for the Sappers.

== Football career ==
The Royal Engineers A.F.C. had adopted the association code, and Olivier's skills were easily transferable. He is first recorded playing football in December 1872, albeit against the Engineers; the Sappers had arranged a game with the Gitanos at the Chatham Lines, but the Gitanos turned up two players short, and Olivier (plus Lieut. Baddeley) played for the visitors instead.

Olivier impressed in his few games in the 1872–73 season, and made his competitive debut as one of the six forwards for the Sappers in the 1873–74 FA Cup first round, in a 5–0 rout of Brondesbury. He was also one of the players selected for the Engineers' tour of northern England over Christmas and New Year 1873, starring with two goals in a 4–0 win over the Sheffield Association, played half to association laws and half to Sheffield laws, in December, in front of a crowd of 3,000 at Bramall Lane. He scored one by dribbling past goalkeeper Carr, the other by following up a shot from Ellis which had come back off the crossbar.

Olivier featured in every round of the Cup up to and including the 1874 FA Cup final, without scoring a goal, and he collected a runners-up medal after the Sappers lost 2–0 to Oxford University.

The final was Olivier's last Cup tie - it was almost his last match in toto, the only other match in which he is recorded as a player being an inter-company match at Chatham Lines in September 1874.

== Post-football career ==
Olivier qualified as an associated member of the Institute of Civil Engineers in 1875 and was sent to Bombay in June 1875; he saw active service at the end of the decade in the Second Afghan War. For most of the rest of his working life, he held senior engineering roles on the Indian railways, other than from 1885 to 1889, which he spent in the Sudan. He retired, as a Colonel, in June 1906.

== Personal life ==
One of his brothers, Gerard, was the father of the actor Laurence Olivier.

Olivier was a great-great-great nephew of the printmaker Jean-Baptiste Massé, and via that link owned a collection of paintings by Jean-Étienne Liotard, who had been Massé's apprentice master.

He married Mary Ann Duckworth at St Mary's, Bryanston Square, London, on 26 June 1888, his father officiating at the ceremony; P. G. von Donop was the best man.

The couple had two children, but Mary died after just three years of marriage. He lived out his life at Shapley Hill, in Winchfield, where he died in 1935. He left an estate worth over £30,000, and bequeathed his Westmorland farm, Blea Tarn, to the National Trust.
