= Arthur Johnson (historian) =

English historian and chaplain (1845–1927)

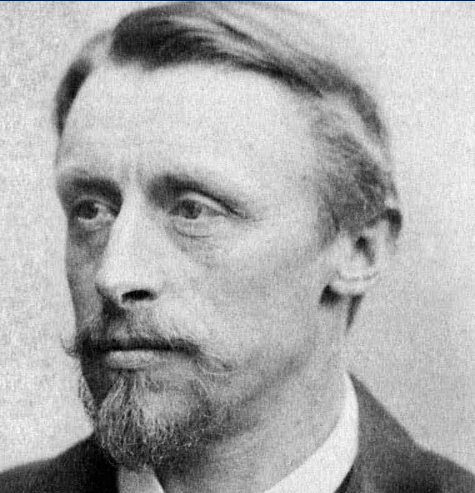

Reverend Arthur Henry Johnson (8 February 1845 – 31 January 1927) was an English historian and the chaplain of All Souls College, Oxford. He was a member of the Oxford University football team which won the FA Cup in 1874. He played a pioneering role in the development of the Oxford University Department for Continuing Education.

== Family and education ==
Johnson was born in Marylebone, London on 8 February 1845, the second son of George John Johnson and his wife, Frederica née Hankey, and was baptised at St Mary's Church, Bryanston Square on 11 March 1845. His father was a captain in the Coldstream Guards.

From 1856, he was educated at Eton College, from where he matriculated on 9 April 1864, going up to Exeter College, Oxford. In 1866, he took a Second in Classical Moderations, graduating as Bachelor of Arts in 1868 with a First Class degree in Law and History, following which he joined All Souls College.

== Athletics and football career ==
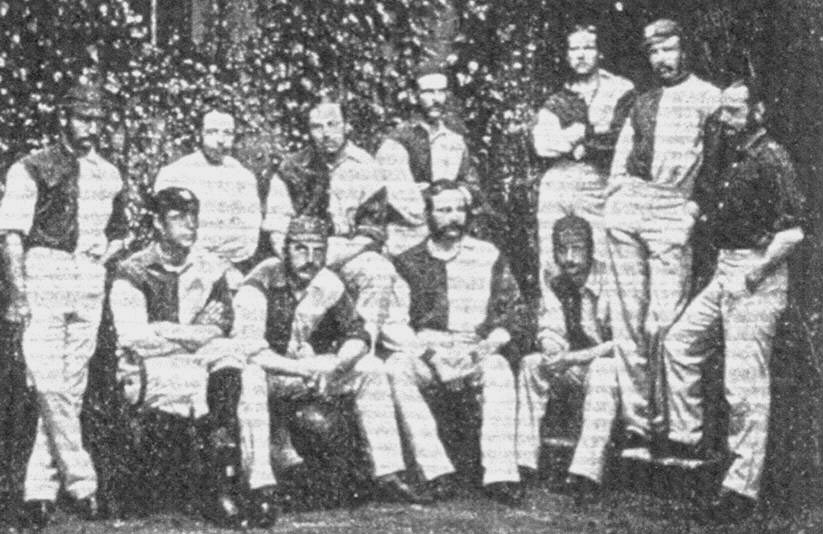
Oxford University's F.A. Cup winning side of 1874. Johnson is fourth from left in the back row.

Johnson was a keen athlete, winning the Eton College steeplechase in 1862. At Oxford, he won Blues for running in 1865 and 1866. He finished in second place in the two mile race in 1865, behind Richard Webster, later Viscount Alverstone, who represented Cambridge. In 1866, he was prevented from finishing the two mile race, because of crowd interference. At college, he was also keen on fishing, hunting and shooting. His Times obituary described him as "one of the very finest riders with any pack of hounds", "an indefatigable shot, and an almost perfect fisherman".

He played football for Eton and Exeter College, before becoming a member of the Oxford University team, for whom he played as a forward, famed for his "speedy runs". Despite having graduated several years earlier, and being an ordained clergyman, Johnson was selected as a member of the University team that played in the 1874 FA Cup Final, although all the other ten members of the side were undergraduates. Of the eleven members of the university team, four (including Johnson) became clergyman and five took up the law as a profession. In the final, played at Kennington Oval on 14 March 1874 against a team from the Royal Engineers, the university ran out as 2–0 winners, with goals from Charles Mackarness and Frederick Patton.

In later years, when a "don" at the university, he often surprised students returning late to their rooms, by the speed with which he was able to catch them if they tried to run away. His obituary in The Times states that "at all forms of sport he was facile princeps (easily the best)".

== Academic life ==
After graduating, Johnson joined All Souls College, where he was elected a Fellow in 1869 and appointed Chaplain, retaining these positions until 1873. He was ordained in 1872, but remained at Oxford for the rest of his life, as a lecturer in Modern History in the following colleges:

- Pembroke College (1874–1884)
- St John's College (1874–1884)
- Wadham College (1875–1884)
- Trinity College (1876–1903)
- Hertford College (1876–1903)
- Worcester College (1883–1885)
- Corpus Christi College (1884–1885)
- Balliol College (1884–1890)
- Merton College (1884–1923)
- University College (1885–1927)

Johnson was often seen dashing between colleges to give lectures. His Times obituary says that "the number of colleges at which from time to time he was Tutor or Lecturer had become legendary."

In 1906, he was re-elected as a Fellow of All Souls College, and re-appointed as Chaplain, holding both positions until his death in 1927.

Johnson was Chairman of the Modern History Board at Oxford from 1893 to 1912 and Secretary to the Curators of the University Parks from 1911 to 1924. In the latter capacity, he was instrumental in the University acquiring a large stretch of land on the south slope of what became Shotover Park, now known as "Johnson's Piece".

In 1909, he was the Ford Lecturer for which his topic was "The Disappearance of the Small Landowner". Johnson wrote several books on historical topics, including "The Normans in Europe", "Europe in the Sixteenth Century", "The History of the Worshipful Company of the Drapers of London" and "The Age of the Enlightened Despot".

In 1912, he contributed the original biography of fellow Oxford historian Montagu Burrows (1819–1905) to the Oxford Dictionary of National Biography.

Johnson was a "forthright, plain-spoken, athletic man" who was "fond of telling his pupils that nature had destined him for a groom or gamekeeper, for anything but a scholar". At his death, he was described as "a country gentleman in holy orders" and "one of the most prominent figures in Oxford life for upwards of sixty years".

=== Oxford Continuing Education ===
In September 1878, Johnson gave a lecture at King Edward VI School in Birmingham, under the auspices of the Birmingham Higher Education Association, on the topic: "The History of England in the Seventeenth Century". This was the first of the early "Oxford Extension Lectures" which evolved into the Oxford University Department for Continuing Education.

== Marriage and children ==
On 16 April 1873, Johnson married Bertha Jane Todd at St Andrew's church in Wells Street, Westminster. Bertha was the daughter of Dr. Robert Bentley Todd FRS. The marriage was conducted by George Butler, Bishop of Limerick. Together, their "qualities of vitality and charm and a gift for friendship and hospitality … gave them a prominent place in university society".

Following their marriage, the couple lived at 22 Norham Gardens on the Norham Manor estate in North Oxford. They subsequently lived at 8 Merton Street before settling at 5 South Parks Road.

The couple had two children:

- Robert Arthur Johnson, born 26 March 1874
- George Wilfred Johnson, born 12 January 1876

Robert became Deputy Master and Controller of the Royal Mint while George became headmaster of Alleyne's School, Stevenage.

== Death ==
Johnson died in Oxford on 31 January 1927, aged 81, after catching influenza which developed into pneumonia. He was buried at St. Cross Churchyard, Holywell in Oxford. Bertha died three months later, on 24 April, and was buried alongside him.

In July 2013, a bronze 80th Birthday tribute medal by Percy Metcalfe was sold at auction.

== Sporting honours ==
Oxford University

- FA Cup winner: 1874
