= Robert Johnson (civil servant) =

British colonel and civil servant (1874–1938)

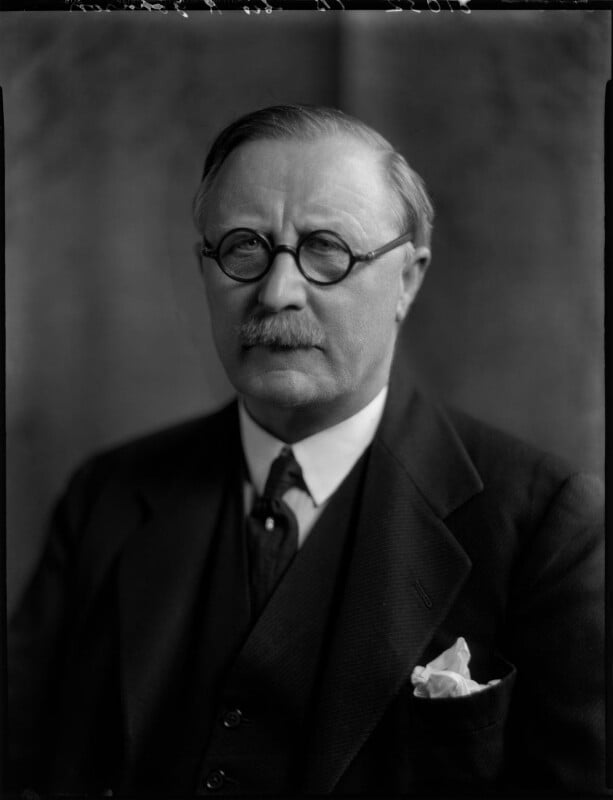
Johnson in 1936

Colonel Sir Robert Arthur Johnson KCVO KBE (26 March 1874 – 2 March 1938) was a British civil servant who served as Deputy Master and Controller of the Royal Mint from 1922 to his death in 1938.

== Early life, education and career ==
The son of the Reverend Arthur Johnson, historian and chaplain of All Souls College, Oxford (and FA Cup winner in 1874 with Oxford University), and his wife, Bertha, Johnson was educated at Winchester College and New College, Oxford, graduating with a first in History in 1897. He was President of the Oxford Union. He joined the Scottish Education Department as a junior examiner and in 1910 transferred to HM Customs and Excise as Assistant Committee Clerk.

== Military service ==
He was commissioned into the Volunteer Force in 1889 and served with the 41st Squadron, Imperial Yeomanry during the Second Boer War. From 1907 to 1911 he was brigade major of the South Midland Infantry Brigade and from 1911 to 1919 he commanded the 9th (Cyclist) Battalion, Hampshire Regiment, which became the 1st/9th Battalion, Hampshire Regiment in 1915. He commanded the battalion in India, and then in Siberia during the Russian Civil War, for which he was promoted colonel, mentioned in dispatches and appointed Commander of the Order of the British Empire (CBE) in the Siberian War Honours of January 1920.

== Post-war career and the Royal Mint ==
In 1919 he was called to the bar and returned to HM Customs and Excise as Committee Clerk, but was almost immediately transferred to HM Treasury as a Principal and promoted Assistant Secretary in 1920.

In 1922, he was appointed the post of Deputy Master of the Royal Mint. During his tenure, the Mint's export business improved considerably with Johnson's enthusiasm to fulfil orders from overseas creating a flourishing foreign coin production market which remains strong to this day. He also worked as a travelling salesman for the Mint for several years. On 17 June 1922, Johnson formally submitted a proposal to the King that a standing committee should be appointed to advise the Master of the Mint on all matters connected with the designing of coins and medals. Artists including Percy Metcalfe, Humphrey Paget and Langford Jones were encouraged by Johnson to visit the Mint to meet up with both officers and workmen in order to acquaint themselves with the processes with which their designs were transferred to metal.

In a 1930 Royal Mint report Johnson was noted as being 'greatly impressed' with the pattern design of a proposed new obverse effigy of George V by medallist André Lavrillier designed to eliminate the 'ghosting' on pennies which had been a problem a few years earlier. The report highlights Johnson's admiration of Lavrillier's artistic skill and his understanding of the technicalities in the process of die making, an understanding that was often lacking in his English counterparts. Lavrillier produced just four pattern 1933 pennies which were eventually rejected in favour of the original small head design on 1928 to 1932 bronze pennies. In 2016, a Lavrillier pattern penny sold at Baldwin's Auction House in London for £72,000. Only seven 'currency' 1933 pennies were struck, being placed under the foundations of various buildings, with penny production resuming in 1934.

In 1935, the Royal Mint produced a version of the George V 'rocking horse' crown coin dated 1935, with a stylised version of St George and the Dragon by Percy Metcalfe, struck in .916 gold. Only 28 were made and 25 issued. The Royal Mint received 1,329 applications for the coin. The 25 successful recipients received an accompanying letter from the Royal Mint enclosed with the gold crown dated 15 May 1935, informing the recipients of their success in the public ballot in obtaining a gold version of the Silver Jubilee Crown. Each of the 25 letters was hand signed by Johnson with his title, "Deputy Master and Controller of the Mint".

Johnson was appointed Knight Commander of the Order of the British Empire (KBE) in the 1928 Birthday Honours and Knight Commander of the Royal Victorian Order (KCVO) in 1935.

== Personal life and death ==
In 1903, he married Kathleen Eyre Greenwell, daughter of Sir Walpole Greenwell, Bt, with whom he had two daughters.

Johnson died in 1938, aged 63.
