= 1873–74 in English football =

Football in England
- Season: 1873–74

Men's football
- FA Cup: Oxford University

The 1873–74 season was the third season of competitive football in England. Oxford University beat the Royal Engineers 2–0 in the FA Cup

When the Football Association football was formed in 1863, the sport was played mainly by public schools, or teams with public school roots, and amateurism was the norm. This remained the case until the 1880s, when working-class teams began to vie for supremacy.

== National team ==
| Date | Venue | Opponents | Score* | Comp | England scorers |
|---|---|---|---|---|---|
| 7 March 1874 | Hamilton Crescent, Glasgow (A) | Scotland | 1–2 | F | Robert Kingsford (Wanderers) (28 mins) |

* England score given first

Key

- A = Away match
- F = Friendly

== Honours ==
| Competition | Winners | Runners-up | Venue | Result |
|---|---|---|---|---|
| FA Cup | Oxford University | Royal Engineers | Kennington Oval | 2–0 |
