= 1873–74 FA Cup =

1873–74 FA Cup (3rd edition)
Tournament details
- Country: England
- Dates: 9 October 1873; 14 March 1874
- Teams: 28

Final positions
- Champions: Oxford University A.F.C. (1st title)
- Runners-up: Royal Engineers A.F.C.
- Semifinalists: Swifts F.C.; Clapham Rovers F.C.

Tournament statistics
- Matches played: 26
- Goals scored: 58 (2.23 per match)
- Top goal scorer(s): Henry Renny-Tailyour; Royal Engineers A.F.C. (3 goals)

The 1873–74 Football Association Challenge Cup was the third edition of the annual FA Cup, the oldest national football tournament in the world. Entrants increased to 28 teams, 12 more than the previous season; six would never contest a match. It began on 9 October 1873 and ended at the final on 14 March 1874.

Wanderers unsuccessfully defended its second 1873 title at a Replay on 31 January 1874, losing to Oxford University, 1–0.

Oxford University successfully pursued its first FA Cup in the Final on 14 March 1874 in Kennington Oval against the Royal Engineers. 2–0. 2,000 attended.

== Format ==
First round: 28 teams played. The winners moved on.
Second round: 14 teams played. The winner moved on.
Third round: 6 teams, with Swifts getting a bye, played.
Semi-final: 4 teams played.
Final: 2 teams played. Oxford University were the champions.

== Calendar ==
Round	Date	Fixtures					Clubs	New entries this round
Round	Date	Original	Plays	Replays	Walkovers	Byes	Clubs	New entries this round
First round	9 October - 17 November 1873	14	9	2	5	0	28 → 14	28
Second round	15 November - 20 December 1873	7	6	2	1	0	14 → 7	none
Third round	6 December 1873 - 17 January 1874	3	3	1	0	1	7 → 4	none
Semi-finals	28 January - 28 February 1874	2	2	0	0	0	4 → 2	none
Final	14 March 1874	1	1	0	0	0	2 → 1	none

== First round ==
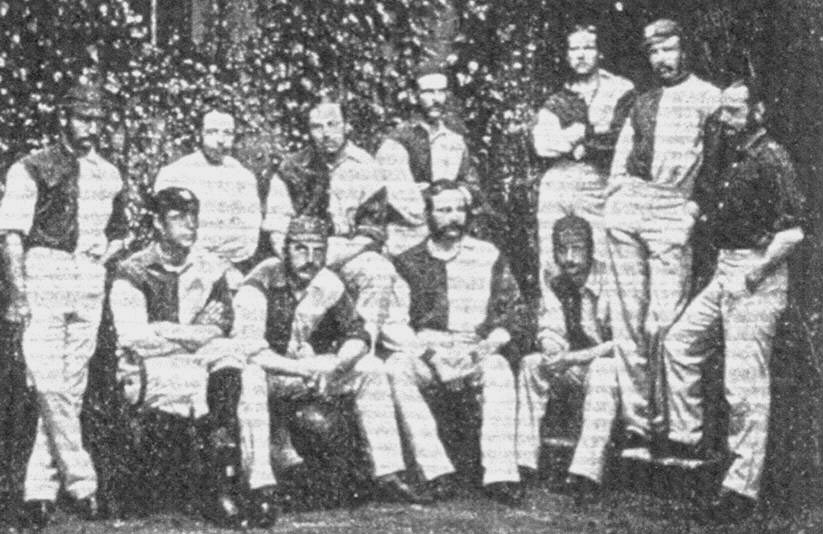
Oxford University's F.A. Cup winning side of 1874.

9 October 1873	Pilgrims F.C.	1–0	Great Marlow F.C.	Hackney Downs, Clapton, London
	E.B. Foley			Attendance: 1022

11 October 1873	Royal Engineers A.F.C.	5–0	Brondesbury F.C.	Chatham Lines, Chatham
	George Addison; Alfred Goodwyn; Herbert Rawson (or Pelham von Donop); Unknown			Attendance: 2148

11 October 1873	Woodford Wells F.C.	3–2	Reigate Priory F.C.	Mr Buxton's field, Monkhams Lane, Woodford
	Fraser; E. Beauchamp		Pawle; Unknown	Attendance: 600; Referee: William Bouch (Crystal Palace F.C.)

18 October 1873	Swifts F.C.	1–0	Crystal Palace F. C.	Dolphin Ground, Slough
	James			Attendance: 1584

25 October 1873	Cambridge University A.F.C.	1–0	South Norwood F.C.	Parker's Piece, Cambridge
	J. Hurrell			Attendance: 500

25 October 1873	1st Surrey Rifles F.C.	0–0	Barnes F.C.	Barracks in Brunswick Road, Camberwell, London
				Attendance: 600

28 October 1873	Uxbridge F.C.	3–0	Gitanos F.C.	Uxbridge Common, Uxbridge
	Hubert Clark; G. Turner; Unknown			Attendance: 650

29 October 1873	Upton Park F.C.	0–4	Oxford University A.F.C.	West Ham Park, West Ham, London
			Thomas Hughes; Cuthbert Ottaway; Walter Paton; Walpole Vidal	Attendance: 1401

30 October 1873	Sheffield F.C.	0–0	Shropshire Wanderers F.C.	Bramall Lane, Sheffield
				Attendance: 700

Clapham Rovers F.C.	w/o from	Amateur Athletic Club

High Wycombe F.C.	w/o from	Old Etonians A.F.C.

Maidenhead F.C.	w/o from	Civil Service F.C.

Trojans F.C.	w/o from	Farningham F.C.

Wanderers F.C.	w/o from	Southall F.C.

=== Replays ===
8 November 1873	Barnes F.C.	1–0	1st Surrey Rifles F.C.	Barnes Green, Barnes, London
	H.A. Hudson			Attendance: 800

17 November 1873	Shropshire Wanderers F.C.	0–0; Sheffield won on coin toss	Sheffield F.C.	Racecourse Ground, Monkmoor, Shrewsbury
				Attendance: 100

== Second round ==
15 November 1873	Clapham Rovers F.C.	1–1	Cambridge University A.F.C.	Clapham Common, Clapham, London
	Unknown		Mitford	Attendance: 1336

22 November 1873	Maidenhead F.C.	1–0	High Wycombe F.C.	York Road, Maidenhead
	William Wild			Attendance: 1293

22 November 1873	Oxford University A.F.C.	2–0	Barnes F. C.	The Parks, Oxford
	Frederick Patton; Unknown			Attendance: 1402

22 November 1873	Sheffield F.C.	1–0	Pilgrims F.C.	Bramall Lane, Sheffield
	Thomas Sorby			Attendance: 747

22 November 1873	Swifts F.C.	2–1	Woodford Wells F.C.	Dolphin Ground, Slough
	Ernest Bambridge; Nicolls		R. Beauchamp	Attendance: 750

26 November 1873	Royal Engineers A.F.C.	2–1	Uxbridge F.C.	Chatham Lines, Chatham
	Henry Renny-Tailyour; Pelham von Donop		Hubert Heron	Attendance: 1000

Wanderers F.C.	w/o from	Trojans F.C.

=== Replays ===
29 November 1873	Cambridge University A.F.C.	1–1	Clapham Rovers F.C.	Parker's Piece, Cambridge
	Unknown		Jarvis Kenrick	Attendance: 1410

20 December 1873	Clapham Rovers F.C.	4–1	Cambridge University A.F.C.	Clapham Common, Clapham, London
	Edgar Field; Jarvis Kenrick; St. Quintin		Roberts	Attendance: 1419

== Third round ==
6 December 1873	Wanderers F.C.	1–1	Oxford University A.F.C.	The Oval, Kennington, London
	Charles Alcock		Frederick Maddison	Attendance: 2000; Referee: Alfred Stair

10 December 1873	Royal Engineers A.F.C.	7–0	Maidenhead F.C.	Chatham Lines, Chatham
	Unknown			Attendance: 2397

17 January 1874	Clapham Rovers F.C.	2–1	Sheffield F.C.	Cricket Ground, Peterborough
	Walter Buchanan; George Holden		Kirke Smith	Attendance: 1505

Swifts F.C.	bye

=== Replay ===
31 January 1874	Oxford University A.F.C.	1–0	Wanderers F.C.	The Parks, Oxford
	Thomas Hughes			Attendance: 1500

== Semi-finals ==
28 January 1874	Royal Engineers A.F.C.	2–0	Swifts F.C.	The Oval, Kennington, London
	Henry Renny-Tailyour			Attendance: 2500

28 February 1874	Oxford University A.F.C.	1–0	Clapham Rovers F.C.	The Oval, Kennington, London
	Walpole Vidal			Attendance: 1500

== Final ==
14 March 1874

Oxford University A.F.C.	2–0	Royal Engineers A.F.C.
Charles Mackarness 10'; Frederick Patton 20'	Report

The Oval, Kennington, London
Attendance: 2000
Referee: Alfred Stair (Upton Park F.C.)

== See also ==
- FA Cup
- FA Cup Final
