= Henry Hammond (disambiguation) =

Henry Hammond (1605–1660) was an English churchman.

Henry Hammond may also refer to:

- Henry Hammond (footballer, born 1866) (1866–1910), English footballer
- Henry Hammond (Australian footballer) (1881–1961), Australian rules footballer
- Henry Hammond (American football) (1913–2004), football player for the Chicago Bears
- Henry Hammond, fictional character in Louisa

== See also ==
- Harry Hammond (disambiguation)
