= History of the British penny (1901–1970) =

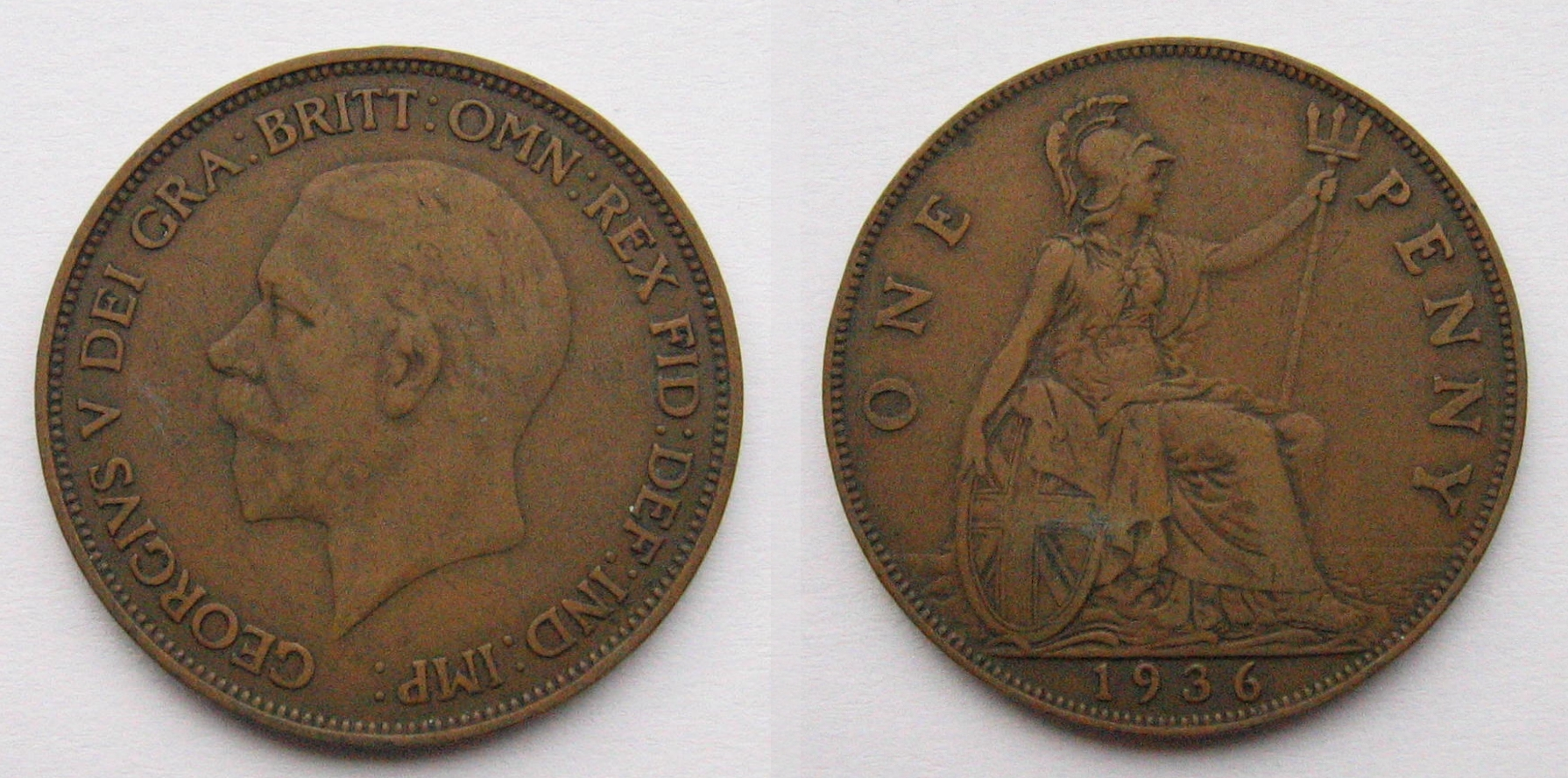
A 1936 George V penny

The British penny (1/240 of a pound sterling), a large, pre-decimal coin which continued the series of pennies which began in about the year 700, was struck intermittently during the 20th century until its withdrawal from circulation after 1970. From 1901 to 1970, the obverse ("heads" side) of the bronze coin depicted the monarch who was reigning at the start of the year. The reverse, which featured an image of Britannia seated with shield, trident, and helm, was created by Leonard Charles Wyon based on an earlier design by his father, William Wyon. The coins were also used in British colonies and dominions that had not issued their own coins.

In 1895 the design on the reverse was modified by the Engraver of the Royal Mint George William de Saulles and after Queen Victoria's death in 1901, de Saulles was called upon to create a design for the obverse which would feature Edward VII. This feature appeared on the version of the penny which went into circulation in 1902, and it remained in circulation until the year of Edward's death, 1910. An obverse version of the penny designed by Sir Bertram Mackennal and depicting George V went into circulation in 1911, and it remained in circulation with some modifications until the year of the king's death, 1936. No new pennies were produced for commerce in 1933, because a sufficient number were already in circulation, but at least seven were struck that year, mostly for placement beneath foundation stones and in museums; today they are valuable. Edward VIII's short reign is only represented by a single pattern coin, dated 1937. That year, a new obverse design by Humphrey Paget which depicted George VI went into use. From 1941 to 1943, during the Second World War, pennies were only struck for the colonies; these are all dated 1940 which was the most recent year of production in the United Kingdom. After the war, demand for the penny began to diminish. Most of the 1950 and 1951 pieces were sent to Bermuda, where many of them were retrieved from circulation and repatriated by British coin dealers because of their relative scarcity.

Although commerce did not require them in 1953, pennies which bore the likeness of Elizabeth II were minted in sets which were sold to the public, using an obverse design by Mary Gillick. One 1954 penny was struck, for internal Mint purposes. By 1961, new pennies were needed again for circulation, and they were produced in large numbers. The officials who planned to introduce decimalisation in the 1960s did not favour keeping the large bronze penny, the value of which had been eroded by inflation. The last pennies which went into circulation were dated 1967—a final proof set was dated 1970. The old pennies quickly went out of use after Decimal Day, 15 February 1971—there was no exact decimal equivalent of them, and the slogan "use your old pennies in sixpenny lots" explained that pennies and "threepenny bits" were only accepted in shops if their total value was six old pence (exactly 2 1/2 new pence). The old penny was demonetised on 31 August of that year.

== Edward VII (pennies struck 1902–1910) ==
Following the death of Queen Victoria on 22 January 1901, officials at the Royal Mint planned for new coins, to bear the image of her son and successor, Edward VII. New coin designs had been introduced in the 1890s, and Mint officials believed the British people wanted as few changes to the coinage as possible. Thus, it was decided not to alter the reverses of the three bronze coins (the penny, halfpenny and farthing), as a new portrait of the Queen had been introduced in 1895. At that time, the Engraver of the Royal Mint, George William de Saulles, had modified Leonard Charles Wyon's depiction of Britannia on the reverse of the bronze coins—the lighthouse and sailing ship that had flanked her were removed. De Saulles was tasked with creating a depiction of Edward for the King's new coinage. The Mint continued to strike coins depicting Victoria, dated 1901, until the King's coinage was ready in May 1902.

The King sat for de Saulles twice, in February and June 1901, and the engraver also used a drawing of Edward by court painter Emil Fuchs. The unadorned bust of the King that resulted is in low relief, as de Saulles sought a coin that would be easy for the Royal Mint to strike. Even so, the relatively large size of the head caused metal flow problems for the penny once issued, resulting in "ghosting", a faint outline of the obverse design visible on the reverse. On 20 August 1901, the Mint received confirmation that the de Saulles bust of Edward would be used on all coins. The new bronze coins were made current by a proclamation dated 10 December 1901, effective 1 January 1902.

Edward's pennies were minted to the same standard as the final Victorian issues: 95 percent copper, 4 percent tin and 1 percent zinc, and, like all bronze pennies from 1860 until 1970, they weigh an average of 1/3 ounce (9.4 g) and have a diameter of 1.2 inches (30 mm). The head faces right on the Edward VII coins, with the inscription EDWARDVS VII DEI GRA BRITT OMN REX FID DEF IND IMP. (Note: Edwardus VII Dei Gratia Britanniarum Omnium Rex Fidei Defensor et Indiae Imperator, or "Edward VII by the Grace of God King of all the Britains, Defender of the Faith and Emperor of India") The reverse shows the seated Britannia surrounded by ONE PENNY, with the date at the bottom of the coin; this design remained largely unchanged until the coin's demise after 1970. Pennies were struck with Edward's bust from 1902 to 1910. There are two varieties of 1902-dated pennies, "high tide" and "low tide", due to a decision to raise the apparent water level around Britannia.

== George V (struck 1911–1936) ==
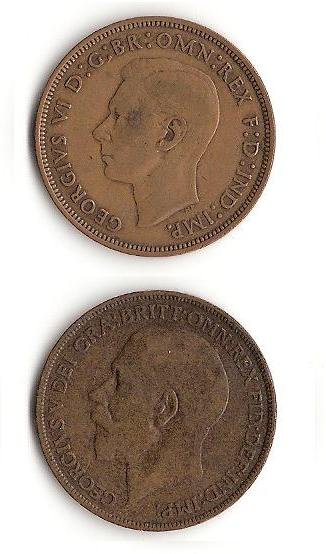
Pennies from 1945 (George VI) and 1926 (George V)

The death of de Saulles in 1903 had led to the abolition of the post of Engraver, and coins for George V, who took the throne on Edward's death in 1910, were subject to a design competition won by Bertram Mackennal, who also prepared the medal for the Coronation. The King apparently liked his work, as he was appointed a Member of the Royal Victorian Order in 1911 and knighted in 1921. The inscription around the left-facing bust reads GEORGIVS V DEI GRA BRITT OMN REX FID DEF IND IMP, (Note: Georgius V Dei Gratia Britanniarum Omnium Rex Fidei Defensor et Indiae Imperator, or "George V by the Grace of God King of All the Britains, Defender of the Faith and Emperor of India") while no significant change was made to the reverse design. The new bronze coins were made current by proclamation dated 28 November 1910, effective 1 January 1911.

In addition to those struck at the Royal Mint, in 1912, 1918 and 1919 some pennies were produced at the Heaton Mint in Birmingham, and are identified by an "H" mint mark to the left of the date. In 1918 and 1919 some were produced at the Kings Norton Metal Co. Ltd, also in Birmingham, and have a "KN" there instead. Both firms also provided blanks to the Royal Mint for striking into pennies from 1912 to 1919. This was due to high demand for small change, initially caused by the 1911 implementation of the National Insurance Act by the Asquith government, and thereafter by the war years. Also feeding the demand for pennies were automatic slot machines, a trend noticed as early as 1898. To reduce the number of worn pieces in commerce, the Royal Mint had in 1908 agreed to accept the return of worn pre-1895 pennies and halfpennies through banks and post offices, and from 1922, pieces dated 1860 to 1894 would be redeemed in any condition, though they remained acceptable in circulation. The pre-1860 copper penny had been demonetised after 1869 in Britain (though accepted at full face value by the Mint until 1873) and in 1877 for the colonies.

King George's pennies were produced in the same alloy as before until 1922, but the following year the composition of bronze coins was set at 95.5 percent copper, 3 percent tin, and 1.5 percent zinc, although the weight remained at 1/3 ounce (9.4 g) and the diameter 1.2 inches (30 millimetres). This alloy was slightly more malleable; the lessened force needed to strike pennies helped minimise ghosting. No pennies were struck for the years 1923, 1924 or 1925; this was due to lack of demand as the interwar years saw alternating gluts and shortages of pennies. In 1928, the King's portrait was reduced in size, effectively eliminating the ghosting problem. The inscription around the three variations of the left-facing head remained GEORGIVS V DEI GRA BRITT OMN REX FID DEF IND IMP, while Britannia remained on the reverse, as before, though that design was slightly modified in 1922.

By the end of George's reign, in 1936, the bronze penny, which had felt lighter in weight compared with older coppers when the alloy was first used for it in 1860, was regarded as weighty and cumbersome, the heaviest bronze coin in circulation in Europe. The weight when in bulk caused problems for business; the London Passenger Transport Board received 6,000 tonnes of pennies, halfpennies and farthings a year. A reduction of size for the penny was deemed impractical, given the time it would take to recoin the 3,000,000,000 pennies in circulation, and because many automatic machines that took pennies would have to be reconfigured. The major response would be the 1937 debut of the brass threepence coin. This twelve-sided piece was introduced since threepence worth of pennies or halfpennies was heavy and inconvenient, and the silver threepenny bit was deemed too small.

=== 1933 rarity ===
There was no need for the Mint to produce any pennies in 1933 because there was no commercial demand, and it held plenty of stock. There was a custom at that time for the King to place a set of coins of the current year under the foundation stone of important new buildings, and the Mint struck three 1933 pennies for this purpose, also one each for its own museum and for the British Museum, and at least two others. The result was a rarity that people thought might turn up in their pocket change, and that is probably the best-known British rare coin.

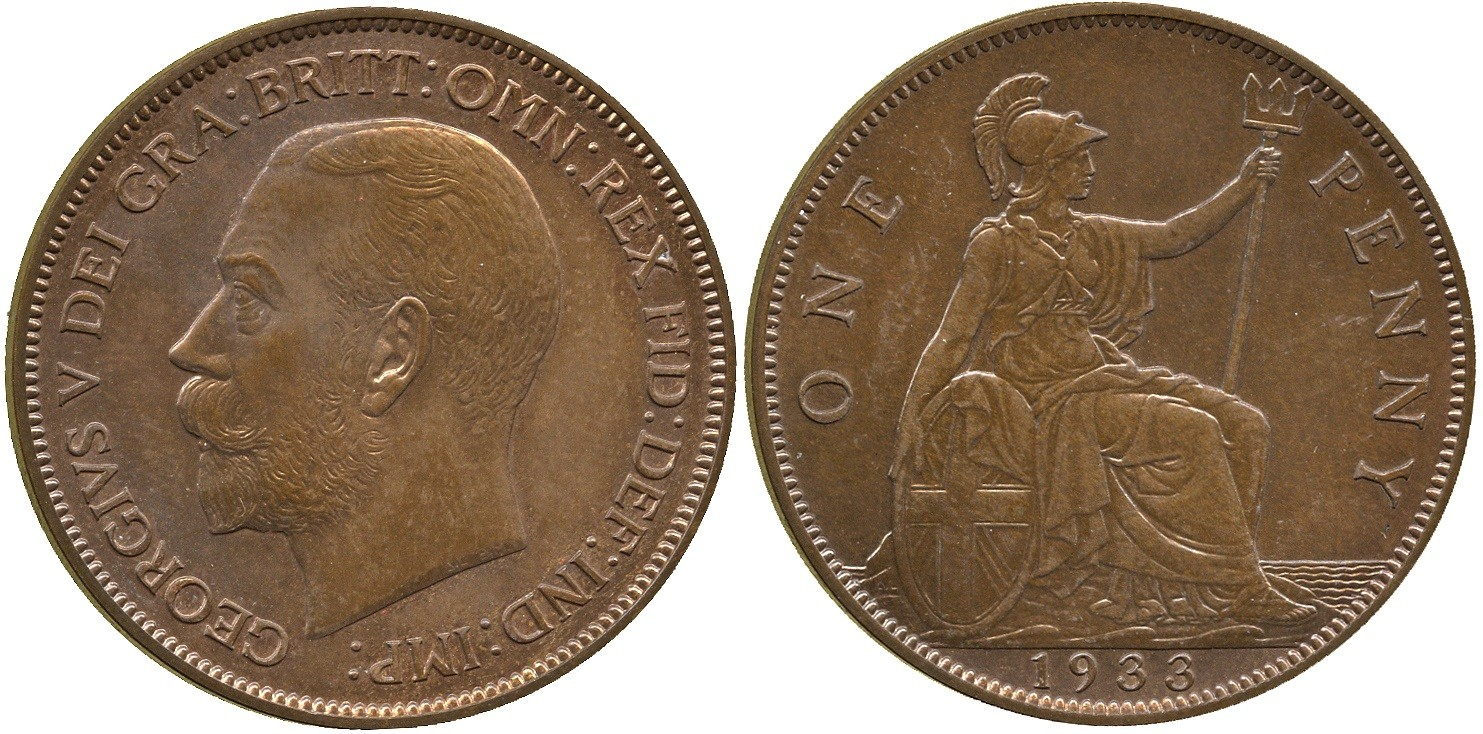
1933 pattern penny

The precise number struck was not recorded at the time; seven are known to exist. One of the 1933 pennies sold in 2016 for US$193,875 (£149,364 at the time). The known 1933 pennies are to be found in the Royal Mint Museum, the British Museum, under the Senate House of the University of London (placed there by King George in 1933), with three now in private collections, and one that was stolen, its whereabouts unknown. The missing coin was placed in 1933 under the foundation stone of Church of St Cross, Middleton, Leeds; it was stolen in August 1970 during the church's reconstruction, by thieves who managed to remove the set of coins from beneath the church. To prevent possible further theft, John Moorman, Bishop of Ripon, ordered that the 1933 penny placed under St Mary's Church, Hawksworth Wood, Kirkstall, Leeds, be unearthed and sold, which it was. As far as is known, the penny under Senate House is still in place. Two others in private hands were sold at auctions in 1969 and 2016 respectively.

Four pattern coins were also made, bearing similar designs to official coins but prepared by sculptor André Lavrillier at the Royal Mint's request. These were rejected by the Standing Committee on Coins, Medals and Decorations in December 1932. One sold at auction on 4 May 2016 for £72,000.

== Edward VIII pattern (dated 1937) ==
No coins of King Edward VIII (1936) were officially issued, but a penny does exist, dated 1937. It is a pattern coin, one produced for royal approval which it would probably have been due to receive about the time that the King abdicated. The obverse, by Humphrey Paget, shows a left-facing portrait of the King, who considered this to be his best side, and wished to break the tradition of alternating with each change of reign the direction in which the monarch faces on coins. The inscription on the obverse is EDWARDVS VIII D G BR OMN REX F D IND IMP. (Note: Edwardus VIII Dei Gratia Britanniarum Omnium Rex Fidei Defensor et Indiae Imperator, or "Edward VIII by the Grace of God King of All the Britains, Defender of the Faith and Emperor of India")

When the Royal Mint's Advisory Committee were considering the question of new designs for King Edward's coinage, they did not favour a new look for the penny. Rather, they sought the return of the lighthouse and ship, seen in the distance on either side of Britannia on pre-1895 pennies, but with the sailing ship seen on Victorian pennies replaced with a modern warship. Officials felt this too aggressive at a delicate international time, and the ship was not restored, but the lighthouse was placed on Edward's patterns, and would be kept on the penny until its abolition after 1970.

== George VI (struck 1937–1952) ==
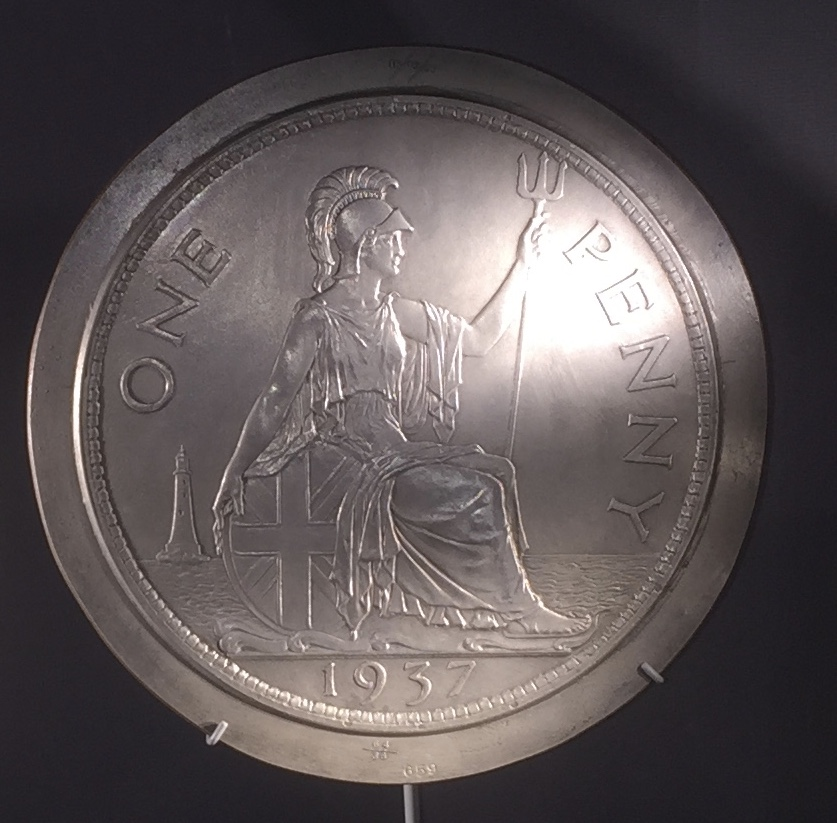
Plaster model for the 1937 penny

King George VI's new coins were made current by a proclamation dated 18 March 1937, which went into force immediately. Although the customary Britannia motif was retained for the penny, the halfpenny and farthing were given their own designs.

George's pennies (1937–1952) have a left-facing bust of him, also by Paget, with the inscription (to 1948) GEORGIVS VI D G BR OMN REX F D IND IMP, (Note: Georgius VI Dei Gratia Britanniarum Omnium Rex Fidei Defensor et Indiae Imperator, or "George VI by the Grace of God King of All the Britains, Defender of the Faith and Emperor of India") and (from 1949) GEORGIVS VI D G BR OMN REX FIDEI DEF, (Note: Georgius VI Dei Gratia Britanniarum Omnium Rex Fidei Defensor, or "George VI by the Grace of God King of All the Britains, Defender of the Faith") removing the Latin abbreviation for "Emperor of India" after that nation had gained independence. Pennies were produced for circulation dated 1937–1940, and 1944–1951, although when necessary pennies were produced for the colonies in 1941–1943 using the 1940 dies. These went principally to Gibraltar and the British West Indies.

Although the 2000 edition of the Coincraft catalogue of British coins says the wartime pause was due to a surplus of pennies, numismatist Kerry Rodgers, in his 2016 article on the currency emergency in Fiji during the Second World War, cited a colonial legislative record to the effect that it was to conserve copper for munitions. Beginning with the 1942 production of 1940-dated pennies, the composition was altered, as tin was a critical war material, rare because most of it came from Malaya, so pennies from then until later in 1945 are 97 percent copper, 0.5 percent tin, and 2.5 percent zinc. Such coins tarnish to a colour different than the prewar coins, and they were treated with sodium thiosulphate to give them a darker tone. That substance, dubbed "hypo", had been used to darken all 1934 pennies before issue and most of the 1935 mintage, "Hypo" would be used again in 1946, discolouring the coins to discourage the hoarding of new pennies. Although the prewar alloy was restored in 1945, the Mint reversed itself in 1959, made pennies out of that wartime composition for the remainder of the coin's pre-decimal history without chemical treatment, and continued its use for the new decimal bronze pieces.

By the late 1940s, demand for pennies was falling in Britain, likely due to the popularity of the lighter, more convenient, brass threepence coin, which weighed less than a quarter of the same value in bronze coins. The immediate aftermath of the war had seen a strong demand for pennies until January 1949, when it dropped off and, in May of that year, the Royal Mint stopped the coin's production. Officials concluded that the fall in demand was permanent due to inflation; its purchasing power was minimal, and many automatic machines no longer took it. The Royal Mint redeemed surplus coppers from the banks for melting beginning in 1951, and by the end of the decade, some £1.2 million worth had been removed from circulation.

The 1950 and 1951 circulation pennies were produced only for the colonies as none were needed in Britain. During 1956, the entire 1950 mintage (still held in stock in Britain) and three-quarters of the 1951 production were sent to Bermuda. Both mintages were low compared with earlier George VI pennies, and London dealers descended on the islands, offering a pound a coin. Collecting coins by date (especially the penny) became popular in the early 1960s; after many bold claims about the investment potential of the 1951 penny were made, the coin acquired something of a cult status. One 1952 penny believed to be unique was struck by the Royal Mint.

== Elizabeth II and end of series (1953–1970) ==
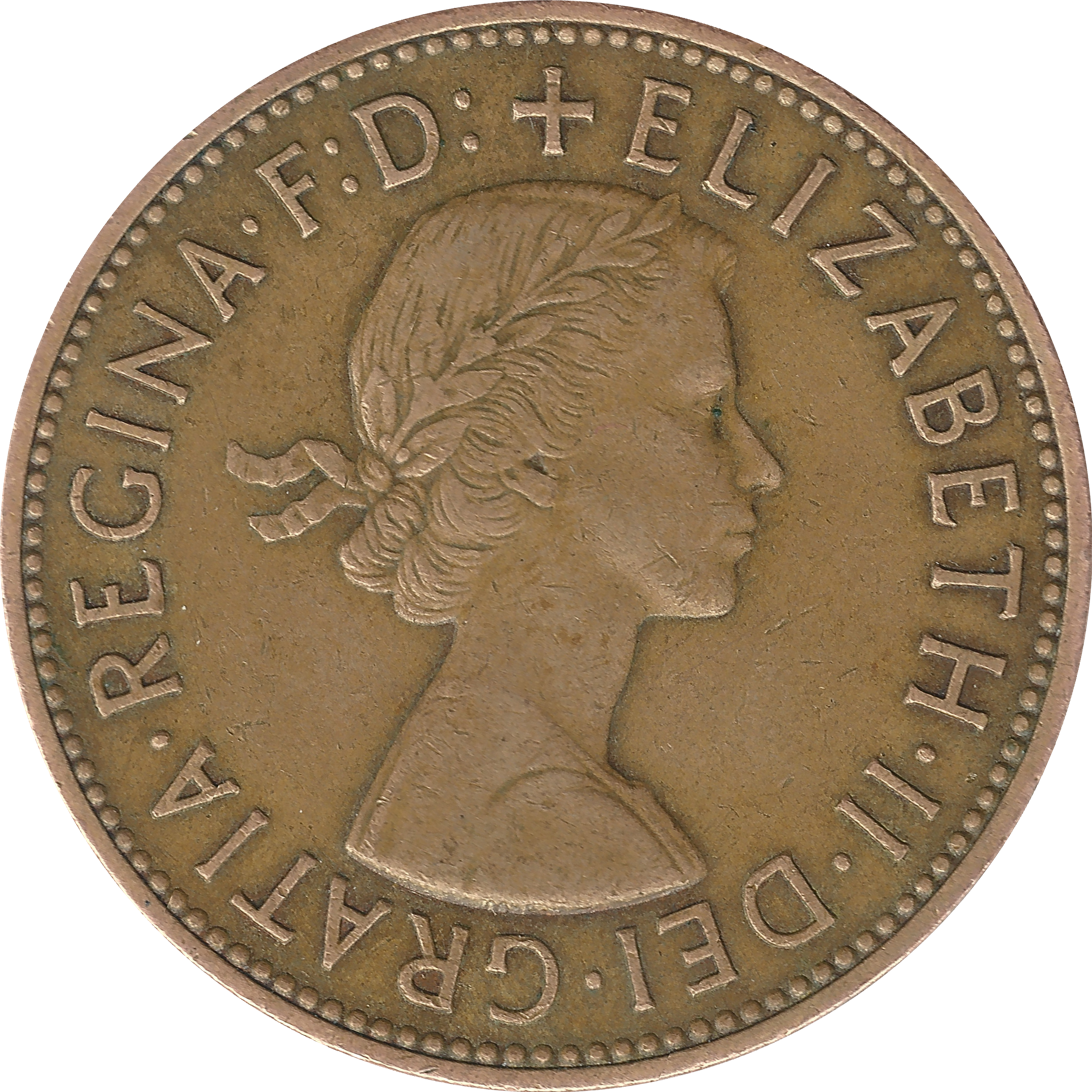
Obverse of a 1963 penny

The series of pennies worth 1/240 of a pound concludes with the pre-decimalisation issues for Queen Elizabeth II. No major change was made to the reverse designs of the penny or other bronze coins with the new reign, and her coins were made current by a proclamation of 25 November 1952, effective 1 January 1953. No pennies were struck for circulation in 1953, the only extant denomination between the farthing and half crown not to see a circulation issue. This was because of the large number of pennies in circulation. Specimen sets, including the penny, were issued for the Queen's Coronation that year, with the obverse of each coin inscribed ELIZABETH II DEI GRA BRITT OMN REGINA F D (Note: Elizabeth II Dei Gratia Britanniarum Omnium Regina Fidei Defensor, or "Elizabeth II by the Grace of God Queen of All the Britains, Defender of the Faith") around the right-facing bust of the Queen by Mary Gillick. These were not issued for circulation, but as the specimen sets were sold for only a slight advance on face value, many were later broken open and spent. In all subsequent mintings of the penny, the inscription was ELIZABETH II DEI GRATIA REGINA F D. (Note: Elizabeth II Dei Gratia Regina Fidei Defensor, or "Elizabeth II by the Grace of God Queen, Defender of the Faith") The deletion of the Latin for "Queen of all the Britains" in favour of designating her simply as "Queen" was due to the changing nature of the British Commonwealth, which by then included some republics.

One 1954 penny is known, struck for die-testing purposes at the Royal Mint, and intended for melting, but recovered from circulation. By the end of the 1950s, the price of metal ensured that every bronze coin was struck at a loss; the Mint hoped for a reduction in size, and the demonetisation of the farthing at the end of 1960 helped clear the way for such a scheme. It was not until 1961 that there was a need for more pennies to be minted, and production continued each year in very large numbers until the final pre-decimal pennies for circulation, dated 1967, were coined.

The old bronze penny was slated for elimination as decimal currency was planned in the 1960s. It continued to be struck after 1967, still bearing that date. The 97 percent copper, 0.5 percent tin, 2.5 percent zinc alloy was used again for the 1960s pennies. Finally, there was an issue of proof quality coins dated 1970 for collectors, to bid farewell to a denomination which had served the country well for 1200 years. The longstanding depiction of Britannia on the penny was translated by sculptor Christopher Ironside to the post-decimal fifty-pence coin.

The Decimal Currency Board had anticipated the need for a transition of up to 18 months after Decimal Day, 15 February 1971, but the "old penny" quickly vanished from circulation and it ceased to be legal tender after 31 August 1971. It had been the last survivor of the three bronze coins, as the halfpenny had been withdrawn in 1969. With decimalisation the new penny carried a value of 1/100 of a pound, 2.4 times the value of its predecessor.

== Mintages ==
Total struck by date and mint mark appearing on coin. H is for Heaton Mint; KN for King's Norton.

- 1901 ~ 22,205,568
- 1902 ~ 26,976,768
- 1903 ~ 21,415,296
- 1904 ~ 12,913,152
- 1905 ~ 17,783,808
- 1906 ~ 37,989,504
- 1907 ~ 47,322,240
- 1908 ~ 31,506,048
- 1909 ~ 19,617,024
- 1910 ~ 29,549,184
- 1911 ~ 23,079,168
- 1912 ~ 48,306,048
- 1912H ~ 16,800,000
- 1913 ~ 65,497,872
- 1914 ~ 50,820,997
- 1915 ~ 47,310,807
- 1916 ~ 86,411,165
- 1917 ~ 107,905,436
- 1918 ~ 84,227,372
- 1918H/1918KN ~ 3,580,800
- 1919 ~ 113,761,090
- 1919H/1919KN ~ 5,290,600
- 1920 ~ 124,693,485
- 1921 ~ 129,717,693
- 1922 ~ 22,205,568
- 1926 ~ 4,498,519
- 1927 ~ 60,989,561
- 1928 ~ 50,178,000
- 1929 ~ 49,132,800
- 1930 ~ 29,097,600
- 1931 ~ 19,843,200
- 1932 ~ 8,277,600
- 1933 ~ 7 known
- 1934 ~ 13,965,600
- 1935 ~ 56,070,000
- 1936 ~ 154,296,000
- 1937 ~ 109,032,000 (plus 26,402 proof coins)
- 1938 ~ 121,560,000
- 1939 ~ 55,560,000
- 1940 ~ 42,284,400
- 1944 ~ 42,600,000
- 1945 ~ 79,531,200
- 1946 ~ 66,855,600
- 1947 ~ 52,220,400
- 1948 ~ 63,961,200
- 1949 ~ 14,324,400
- 1950 ~ 240,000 (plus 17,513 proof coins)
- 1951 ~ 120,000 (plus 20,000 proof coins)
- 1952 ~ 1 known
- 1953 ~ 1,308,400 (plus 40,000 proof coins)
- 1954 ~ 1 known
- 1961 ~ 48,313,400
- 1962 ~ 157,588,600
- 1963 ~ 119,733,600
- 1964 ~ 153,294,000
- 1965 ~ 121,310,400
- 1966 ~ 165,739,200
- 1967 ~ 654,564,000
- 1970 ~ 750,000 (souvenir sets only)
