= Margaret Cossaceanu =

French sculptor

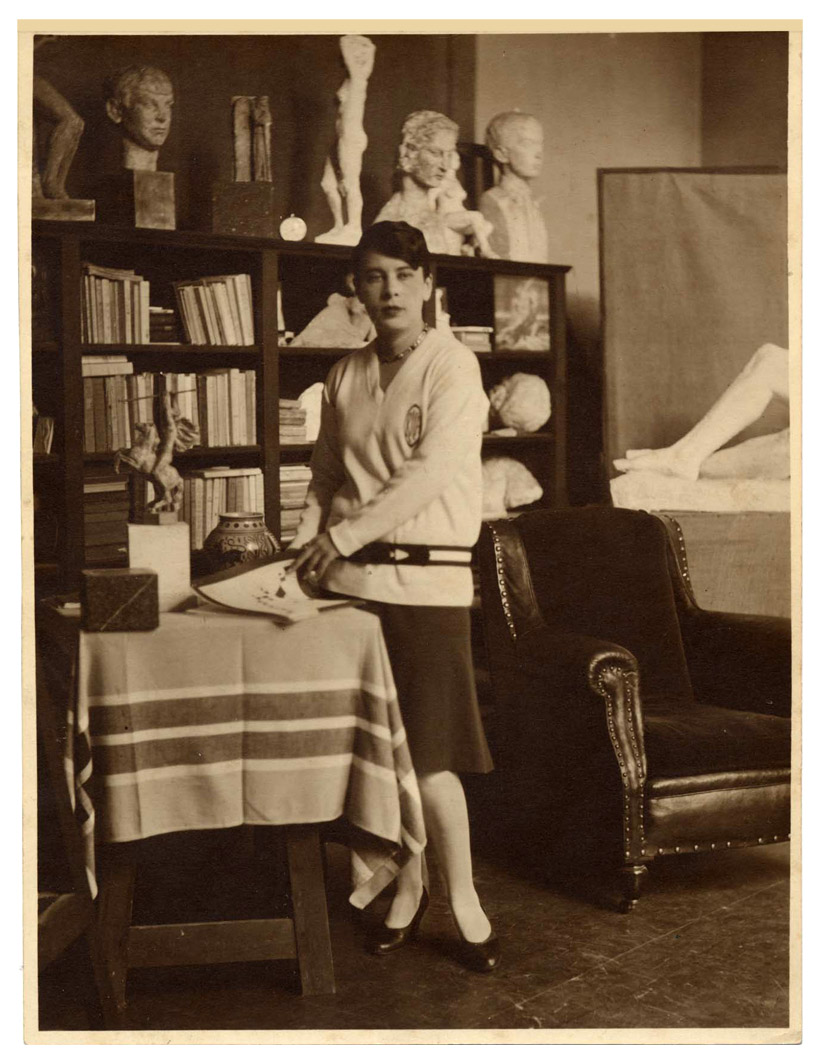

Margaret Cossaceanu, born Margareta Cosăceanu, later Margaret Cossaceanu-Lavrillier (4 January 1893– 22 September 1980) was a French sculptor of Romanian origin.

== Biography ==
Margaret Cossaceanu, was born in Bucharest and was the niece of scientist George Constantinescu, inventor of the Theory of sonics. She studied sculpture from 1910 to 1913 at the School of Fine Arts in Bucharest under Dimitrie Paciurea.

In 1921, she obtained a scholarship enabling her to go to Rome to pursue her studies at the Academy of Fine Arts, (at the same time, painter Lucian Grigorescu was studying there). It was during this stay in the Italian capital that she met French engraver-medalist André Lavrillier, winner of the Prix de Rome in 1914, and boarder at the Villa Medici. He took her to Paris, and introduced her to sculptor Antoine Bourdelle.

After being awarded the Grand Prize at the Academy of Fine Arts in 1922, Cossaceanu left Rome to settle in Paris, where she attended the workshop of her compatriot Constantin Brâncuşi while continuing her studies at the Académie de la Grande Chaumière, in Antoine Bourdelle's studio, where she met Germaine Richier and Alberto Giacometti. Bourdelle took her as a collaborator in his workshop at impasse du Maine. He asked her to recreate in larger scale some of his works, as, for example, his Sapho; For these figurative works she used wax, earth, plaster, bronze or stone. She continued to work with him until his death in 1929. She participated in various Salons and exhibitions, such as the Salon d'Automne or the Salon des Tuileries and produced pieces for the French state. She was commissioned to create a high relief for the International Exposition of Art and Technology in Modern Life (1937), for the Asian and Romanian pavilions. The high relief of the Daces (marble, 3m high) for which she received the diploma of honor is today in Bucharest.

Until 1977, at the request of the Monnaie de Paris, she made several medals (the medal of the deputies of the National Assembly (France) in 1968 - the portraits of Romain Gary, Anna de Noailles, Giacometti, Jean Effel, among others). In 1952, Bernheim-Jeune Gallery organized a retrospective exhibition of her work, and the Museum of Modern Art of the city of Paris acquired The great torso of Woman.

In 1970, for the fortieth anniversary of the death of her master, she created from memory a portrait of Antoine Bourdelle.

In 1929, Cossaceanu married André Lavrillier, with whom she had three children, including photographer Carol-Marc Lavrillier. Margaret Cossaceanu died in Paris on September 22, 1980, at the age of 87.

In 1993, the Galerie Vallois in Paris organized a retrospective show of her work.

== Works and collections (selection) ==
- Pieta, (1923), Musée des Années Trente
- Walkyrie, (1923) used for the Constantinesco (automobile).
- Portrait of Constantin I. Diamandy, Romanian diplomat, (1927)
- Bust André Lavrillier, (1927), Musée national d'art moderne, Pompidou center
- Grand portrait de femme, (1930)
- Statue of Tudor Vladimirescu in Craiova, (1937)
- High relief Daces, (1937) for the Romanian pavillon at the International Exposition of Art and Technology in Modern Life 1937, today in Bucharest
- Bas-relief, Faculté de pharmacie de Paris, (1936-1940)
- Marble Head of Rhodia Bourdelle, (1943), Musée Rolin, Autun
- Bust of Jean Charcot, (1943), Musée national de la Marine, Paris
- Portrait of George Enescu, (1956), Musée de la Philharmonie de Paris
- Head of a young girl, Saint-Brieuc Museum of Art and History
- Monumental, Musée des Années Trente, Boulogne Billancourt
- Woman Torso, (1955), Musée d'Art Moderne de la Ville de Paris.
