= Elphinstone Jackson =

English footballer

Elphinstone Jackson (9 October 1868 – December 1945) was an English amateur footballer who made one appearance as a full back for England in 1891. He was one of the founders of the Indian Football Association (IFA).

== Career ==
Jackson was born in Calcutta, India, the son of a leading judge. He was educated at Lancing College where he was captain of the college team in 1887. He then attended Oriel College, Oxford earning his blue in 1890 and 1891.

Whilst at Oxford, he joined the Corinthian amateur club, making his debut on 22 December 1888. He played intermittently over the next few years and his final appearance came on 21 March 1891 against a Scotland eleven. Scotland also played an official international against Wales on the same day as this match. However, the match against Corinthians was treated as a practice for the match against England, and was considered more important than the game against Wales. The Scots won the match 9–2 with four goals from Frank Watt, and two each from William Sellar and Davie Baird. All three were selected for the forthcoming England international, with Watt scoring a late consolation goal as England won 2–1.

Altogether, Jackson made thirteen appearances for Corinthian, without scoring.

On 7 March 1891, three weeks before the Scotland XI v. Corinthian match, England fielded two national teams on the same day, against Wales at Newcastle Road, Sunderland and against Ireland at Molineux, Wolverhampton. Jackson was one of six new caps for the Welsh game, including his Oxford University colleague Leonard Wilkinson in goal. England were too strong for the Welsh and won 4–1.

Following his studies in England, he returned to India, and together with others founded the Indian Football Association in 1893.

== See also ==
- List of England international footballers born outside England

== Bibliography ==
- Kapadia, Novy (2017). Barefoot to Boots: The Many Lives of Indian Football. Penguin Random House. ISBN 978-0-143-42641-7.
- Majumdar, Boria, Bandyopadhyay, Kausik (2006). Goalless: The Story of a Unique Footballing Nation. Penguin India. ISBN 9780670058747.
- Nath, Nirmal (2011). History of Indian Football: Upto 2009–10. Readers Service. ISBN 9788187891963. Archived from the original on 22 July 2022.
- "Triumphs and Disasters: The Story of Indian Football, 1889—2000" (PDF). Archived from the original (PDF) on 13 August 2012.
- D'Mello, Anthony (1959). Portrait Of Indian Sport. P R Macmillan Limited, London.
