= Oxford FA =

Oxford FA may refer to:

- Oxfordshire County Football Association
- Oxford University Football Association
