= 1874 FA Cup final =

Association football match between Oxford University and Royal Engineers in 1874

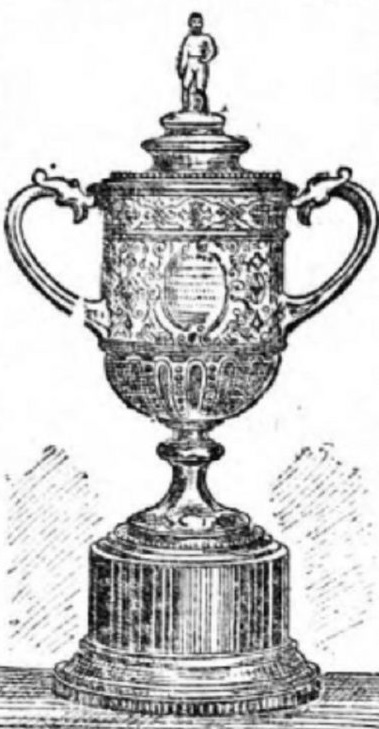
- An illustration of the FA Cup trophy awarded in 1874
- Event: 1873–74 FA Cup
Oxford University	Royal Engineers
2	0
- Date: 14 March 1874
- Venue: Kennington Oval, London
- Referee: Alfred Stair (Upton Park F.C.)
- Attendance: 2,000

The 1874 FA Cup final was a football match between Oxford University and Royal Engineers on 14 March 1874 at Kennington Oval in London. It was the third final of the world's oldest football competition, the Football Association Challenge Cup (known in the modern era as the FA Cup). Both teams had previously reached the final but been defeated by Wanderers. The Engineers had reached the final with comparative ease, scoring sixteen goals and conceding only one in the four previous rounds. Oxford's opponents in the earlier rounds had included two-time former winners Wanderers.

The final was decided by two goals from Oxford in the first twenty minutes. Their opponents had spent two weeks training for the match, an innovative concept at the time, but were repeatedly thwarted by Charles Nepean, the Oxford goalkeeper. The Engineers were said to have missed their best back, Lieut. Alfred Goodwyn, who had been posted overseas.

== Route to the final ==
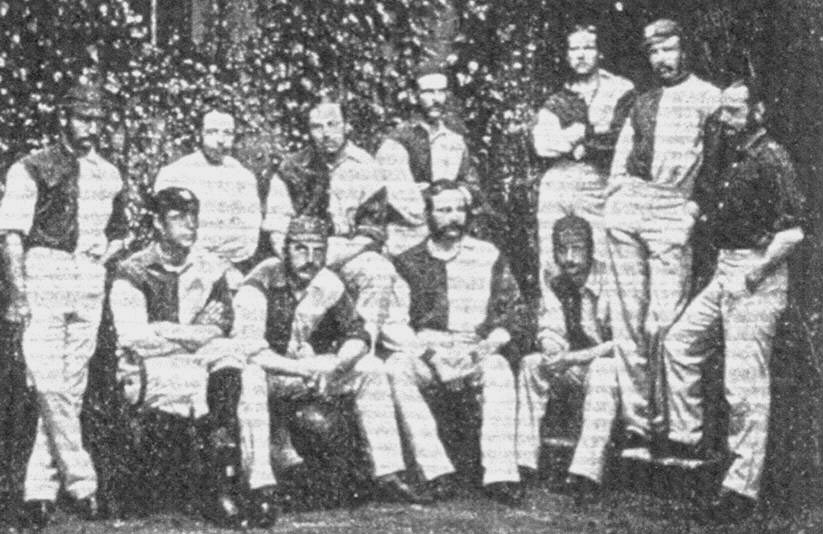
Oxford University's F.A. Cup winning side of 1874. Standing: Vidal, Green, Mackarness, Johnson, Benson, Birley, Nepean; Seated: Ottaway, Patton, Maddison, Rawson.

Oxford University and the Chatham-based Royal Engineers were among 28 entrants to the competition in the 1873–74 season. Both teams were ranked among the strongest in the country at the time, especially the Engineers who played 86 games between 1871 and 1875 and lost only three, scoring a total of 240 goals and conceding only 20.

Both teams progressed through the first round of the competition with little difficulty, Oxford defeating Upton Park 4–0 and the Engineers winning 5–0 against Brondesbury. In the second round, the University beat Barnes 2–0 and the "Sappers", as the Engineers were nicknamed, beat Uxbridge 2–1.

The Engineers comprehensively defeated their quarter-final opponents, Maidenhead, winning 7–0, the first time a team had ever scored as many as seven goals in an FA Cup match. Oxford, on the other hand, were paired with Wanderers, who had won the competition in both its first two seasons and never lost an FA Cup match. They had defeated the Engineers in the 1872 final and Oxford in the 1873 final. The first match finished in a 1–1 draw, necessitating a replay which Oxford won 1–0 to end Wanderers' grip on the competition.

Both semi-final matches were played at Kennington Oval, the home of Surrey County Cricket Club, as specified by the rules in use at the time. Royal Engineers defeated Swifts in the first match to be played, and Oxford booked their place in the final a month later with a 1–0 win over Clapham Rovers.

== Match ==
=== Summary ===
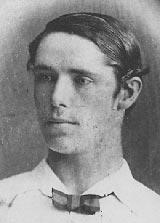
Cuthbert Ottaway was the Oxford captain.

Oxford were able to call on their first-choice goalkeeper, Charles Nepean, who had been unable to play in the previous year's final, which Oxford lost. They also selected William Rawson, whose brother Herbert was in the Engineers' team. The Engineers, who represented the British Army's Corps of Royal Engineers, had undertaken two weeks of special training before the match, an innovative concept in an era when little importance was placed on training, but were unable to field Alfred Goodwyn, considered to be their best back, as he had been posted to India earlier in the year. Oxford's players were not all students, as the team included Arthur Johnson, an ordained clergyman and Fellow of All Souls College. Around 2,000 spectators were in attendance, a smaller crowd than had attended the previous final.

Oxford won the coin toss and elected to begin the game defending the Harleyford Road end of the stadium. Charles Mackarness gave Oxford the lead after just ten minutes. Following an Oxford corner kick, a melee developed in front of the Engineers' goal, and the ball fell to Mackarness, who shot it over the crowd of players and past goalkeeper William Merriman. Frederick Patton doubled the lead ten minutes later after some skillful dribbling by captain Cuthbert Ottaway and Robert Vidal, who was nicknamed the "prince of dribblers" for his skill in that aspect of the game. Just before the call of time, Oxford got the ball between the posts a third time, when a free-kick from near the corner-flag went straight in, but the University did not appeal for a goal; at the time the laws of the game required all free-kicks to be indirect.

The best effort for the Engineers came when Henry Renny-Tailyour's shot struck the goalpost. Late in the game the "Sappers" mounted a series of attacks on the Oxford goal but were unable to score, being repeatedly thwarted by Nepean. Oxford thus won 2–0 and secured the cup.

=== Details ===
14 March 1874

Oxford University	2–0	Royal Engineers
Mackarness 10'; Patton 20'	Report

Kennington Oval, London
Attendance: 2,000
Referee: Alfred Stair (Upton Park F.C.)

O. University	R. Engineers

Gk	(England) Charles Nepean
FB	(England) Charles Mackarness
HB	(England) Francis Birley
HB	(England) Frederick Green
FW	(England) Robert Benson
FW	(England) Frederick Maddison
FW	(England) William Rawson
FW	(England) Cuthbert Ottaway
FW	(England) Rev. Arthur Johnson
FW	(England) Walpole Vidal
FW	(British Raj) Frederick Patton

GK	(England) Capt. William Merriman
FB	(England) Maj. Francis Marindin
HB	(England) Lieut. George Addison
HB	(British Raj) Lieut. Gerald Onslow
FW	(England) Lieut. Pelham von Donop
FW	(Scotland) Lieut. John Blackburn
FW	(England) Lieut. Herbert Rawson
FW	(Scotland) Lieut. Henry Renny-Tailyour
FW	(England) Lieut. Henry Olivier
FW	(England) Lieut. Charles Wood
FW	(Ireland) Lieut. Thomas Digby

Match rules

- 90 minutes normal time.
- 30 minutes extra-time if scores are level, at captains' discretion.
- Replay if scores still level.
- No substitutes.

== Post-match ==
As occurred each year until 1882, the winning team did not receive the trophy at the stadium on the day of the match, but later in the year at their annual dinner. The secretary of the Royal Engineers club, in his official report, stated that Oxford had thoroughly deserved their victory. Some time after the match, the Engineers discovered that Alfred Goodwyn, their absent star player, had died in India on the day of the final of injuries sustained in a fall from a horse.
