= Darvall =

Darvall is the name of

- Chum Darvall (born 1957), Australian middle-distance runner and sprinter
- Denise Darvall (1942–1967), donor in the world's first successful human heart transplant
- Frank Ongley Darvall (1906–1987), British politician and diplomat
- Air Marshall Sir Lawrence Darvall (1898 – 1968), senior Royal Air Force officer
- Margaret Darvall (1909–1996), president of the Ladies' Alpine Club and the Pinnacle Club
- Peter Darvall, Vlce-Chancellor and President of Monash University

== See also ==
- Darvell (surname)
