= Charles Mackarness =

English Anglican priests (1850–1918)

Charles Coleridge Mackarness (22 July 1850 – 1 March 1918) was the Archdeacon of the East Riding between 1898 and 1916. In his youth, he had been a keen amateur sportsman and played twice in the FA Cup Final for Oxford University, being on the victorious side in 1874 and runner-up in the previous year.

== Early life and family ==
Mackarness was born at Tardebigge in Worcestershire, the eldest son of John Mackarness and his wife, Alethea Buchanan Mackarness, née Coleridge (1827–1909). At the time of Charles's birth, his father was vicar at Tardebigge and then, from 1855, rector at Honiton in Devon, before being appointed Bishop of Oxford in 1870, a post he held until shortly before his death. His mother was the youngest daughter of John Taylor Coleridge, a judge, who was the nephew of the poet Samuel Taylor Coleridge. He was baptised at St Bartholomew's Church, Tardebigge on 11 August 1850.

His siblings included Frederick (1854–1920), a Liberal politician and Member of Parliament for Newbury and his sister, Eleanor (1855–1936), who married Randal Parsons (1848–1936), the son of William Parsons, 3rd Earl of Rosse and his wife Mary, both of whom were prominent astronomers. Another sister, Mary (1851–1940), married Bernard Coleridge, 2nd Baron Coleridge, a judge who became MP for Sheffield Attercliffe.

== Education ==
Mackarness was educated at Winchester College, representing the school at cricket in 1868.

He matriculated and went up to Exeter College, Oxford in 1869, graduating with a BA 2nd class (Final Classical School) in 1873, and an MA in 1876.

In 1901, he became a fellow of Denstone College. He obtained his Bachelor of Divinity (BD) and Doctor of Divinity (DD) degrees in 1914.

== Cricket career ==
Having played cricket for Winchester College in 1868, he made single appearances for the Gentlemen of Devon and for Devon in 1869. While at Oxford, he made appearances for various teams, including a trial for the university team in May 1873, becoming captain of the Exeter College XI in 1873.

== Football career ==
Mackarness was a founder member of the Oxford University Association Football Club on 9 November 1871. Mackarness played for the university side during its early years, generally playing as a full back. Described as having "a brilliant kick, never misses his kick", he was "a back who knows but few superiors".

Oxford University did not enter the inaugural FA Cup tournament in which the first matches were played two days after the Oxford University AFC was founded. The following year, the club entered at the first round stage, defeating Crystal Palace 3–2 on 26 October 1872, and winning their next three matches to reach the semi-final, where they were drawn against the leading Scottish club, Queen's Park. Queen's, however, were unable to raise the funds to travel to London and withdrew from the competition, giving Oxford a bye into the final.

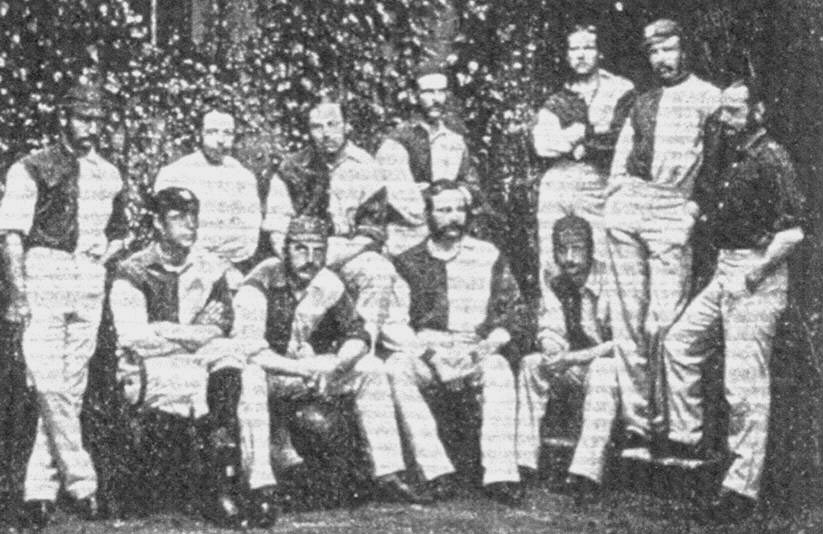
Oxford University's F.A. Cup winning side of 1874 (Mackarness sitting in back row, third from left).

In the final, played at Lillie Bridge on 29 March 1873, the university met the defending champions, Wanderers who, under the original rules of the competition, were exempt from the earlier rounds. Mackarness played as the solitary full-back for the university, who dominated much of the match, but conceded a goal after 27 minutes, when the Wanderers captain Arthur Kinnaird outpaced the university's backs and kicked the ball between the goalposts. In a desperate attempt to secure an equalising goal, Oxford took the unusual step of dispensing with the use of a goalkeeper and moved Andrew Leach upfield to play as a forward. This plan back-fired at around the 80-minute mark, however, when Charles Wollaston broke through and scored a second goal for the Wanderers, who thereby retained the trophy.

In the following year, Oxford University again entered the tournament at the First-Round stage where they defeated Upton Park 4–0, going on to defeat Barnes, Wanderers and Clapham Rovers to reach the final, where they met the Royal Engineers. The final was played at Kennington Oval on 10 March 1874, in front of a crowd of 2,000. Mackarness again played as the university's sole full-back. Ten minutes into the match, Oxford gained a corner; as the corner was taken, a melee developed in front of the Engineers' goal, and the ball fell to Mackarness, who shot it over the crowd of players and past goalkeeper William Merriman. Ten minutes later, the university doubled their lead with a goal from Frederick Patton, after some skilful dribbling by captain Cuthbert Ottaway and Robert Vidal. Despite some late attacks on goal from the Sappers, Oxford hung on to win 2–0 and thus secured the cup for the first and only time.

== Clerical career ==
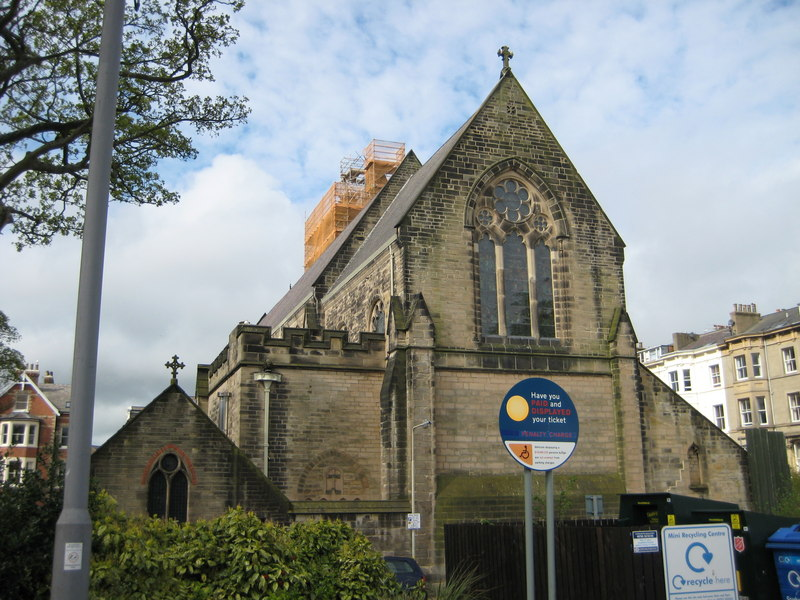
St Martin's-on-the-Hill, Scarborough

Mackarness was ordained as a deacon in 1874 and as a priest the following year. He was the Assistant Curate of St Mary's, Reading from 1874 to 1879, and also a chaplain to his father, the Bishop of Oxford, from 1875 to 1878. He kept up his football career by founding the Reading Minster club.

He was the Chaplain, Censor and Theological Lecturer at King's College, London between 1879 and 1882, before becoming vicar at Aylesbury in 1882, where he was responsible for St Mary's and St John's churches. From 1887, he combined this role with that of rural dean at Aylesbury until January 1889, when he became vicar of St Martin's, Scarborough. His sister, Julia, had been superintendent of St Martin's Lodge (a home for ladies) in Scarborough since 1882.

Although Mackarness was a dedicated Tractarian, at St Martin's his ministry was based on the Book of Common Prayer. At St Martin's, Mackarness established the use of a form of moderate Catholicism known as "Prayer-Book Catholicism", considered suitable for a church catering to a seasonal holiday congregation. His period at St Martin's brought financial stability to the parish, while he was known for his kindness and humour, especially towards children.

During the First World War on 16 December 1914, St Martin's-on-the-Hill was one of many buildings in Scarborough which were damaged during the German bombardment of the town. The raid took place just as the 8.00 a.m. communion service was commencing. Despite the noise and damage, Mackarness continued with the service, before returning to the vicarage, where he found that shrapnel had entered through the window of his study and damaged the bookshelf behind his desk. Later that day, the wedding of Richard Horsley and Winnifred Duphoit continued as planned. Charles Mackarness's "sangfroid" remains a "staple" of tours of St Martin's church in the 21st century.

Mackarness was appointed Prebendary (Canon) of York in 1896 and Archdeacon of the East Riding in 1898, combining this with the care of his parish until his retirement. He was also an Examining Chaplain to the Archbishop of York.

== Wife and children ==
On 14 September 1882, he married Grace Emily Milford (1856–1944), the daughter of Robert Newman Milford and his wife Emily Sarah, née Sumner. Her father was Rector of East Knoyle, Wiltshire and her mother was the daughter of Charles Sumner, Bishop of Winchester and sister to Humphrey Milford, head of the London operations of Oxford University Press.

The couple had six children:

- Margaret (Margot) Alethea Sumner Mackarness (1883–1960)
- Hugh John Coleridge Mackarness (1885–1964)
- Elfled (Elfie) Mary Buchanan Mackarness (1887–1968)
- Cuthbert George Milford Mackarness (1890–1962)
- Guy Charles Neave Mackarness (1893–1958)
- Roger Seymour Patterson Mackarness (1896–1966)

Grace Mackarness kept a daily diary between 1883 and 1916, many of which are now available to read at the Mackarness family website.

== Retirement and death ==
Mackarness retired in September 1916 and he and his wife moved to 1 Polstead Road, Oxford, where he died on 1 March 1918, aged 67.

== Publications ==
- The Message of the Prayer-Book, 1887
- The Poetry of Keble as a Guide to the Clergy, 1891
- Memorials of the Episcopate of Bishop Mackarness, 1892
- Faith and Duty in Time of War (sermons), 1916

== Bibliography ==
- Collett, Mike (2003). The Complete Record of the FA Cup. Sports Books. ISBN 1-899807-19-5.
- Craig, Frederick Walter Scott (1989). British Parliamentary Election Results: 1885–1918. Politico's Publishing Ltd. ISBN 978-0900178276.
- Gibbons, Philip (2001). Association Football in Victorian England – A History of the Game from 1863 to 1900. Upfront Publishing. ISBN 1-84426-035-6.
- Warsop, Keith (2004). The Early F.A. Cup Finals and the Southern Amateurs. Soccer Data. ISBN 1-899468-78-1.
