= Frederick Maddison (footballer) =

English footballer

Frederick Brunning Maddison (born Frederick Chappell; 22 July 1849 – 25 September 1907) was an English footballer who played for England as a midfielder in the first international match against Scotland, and won two FA Cup medals with Oxford University in 1874 and with The Wanderers in 1876.

Later he was a music publisher and, together with his wife the composer Adela Maddison, was closely associated with the French composer Gabriel Fauré.

== Early life ==
He was born on 22 July 1849 in Westminster, Middlesex as Frederick Chappell, the son of Frederick Patey Chappell and Eleanor (née Maddison). On 5 February 1873, he changed his name to Frederick Brunning Maddison, taking his second name from his grandfather.

He was educated at Marlborough College before going up to Oxford University, where he was a member of Brasenose College.

== Football career ==
He played for Scotland in the third of the unofficial matches prior to the first official international match, a 1–1 draw on 25 February 1871 playing under the pseudonym "F. Maclean". He won his solitary England cap playing on the left of midfield in England's first ever international match against Scotland on 30 November 1872.

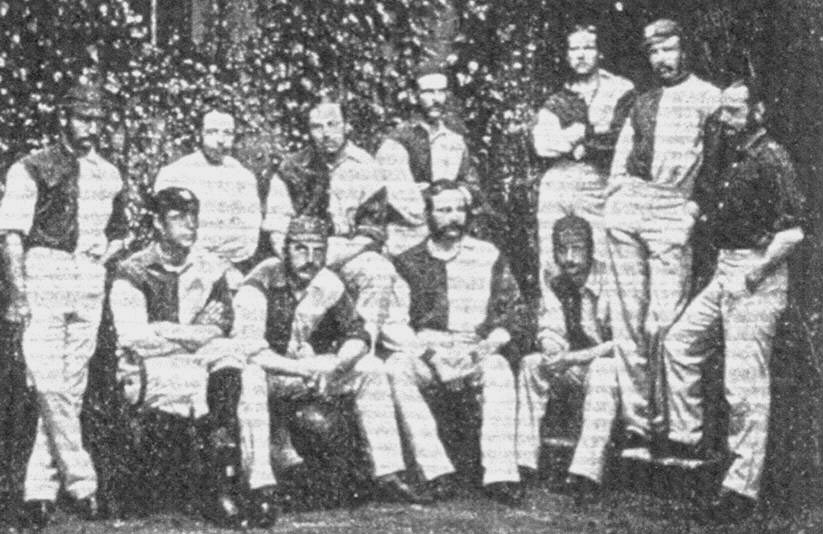
Oxford University's F.A. Cup winning side of 1874 (Maddison sitting upright second from right in front row).

The University reached the 1874 FA Cup Final and (with Maddison now on the right) this time they were successful, defeating the Royal Engineers by two goals to nil. Maddison was involved in the move which resulted in the second goal, when he, together with Cuthbert Ottaway and Robert Vidal, "dribbled their way to the Engineers' goal, where Frederick Patton was waiting to slide the ball between the posts."

Maddison also played for amateur club Crystal Palace (not the later professional club) and the Civil Service, and in representative matches for London and The South versus The North.

== Life outside football ==
On 14 April 1883 he married Katharine Mary Adela Tindal, at Christ Church, Lancaster Gate, London. They had two children, Diana Marion Adela and Noel Cecil Guy, born in 1886 and 1888 respectively. His wife was a composer, usually known as Adela Maddison.

From around 1894, the couple played a major part in encouraging and facilitating the entry onto the London musical scene of the French composer Gabriel Fauré. Frederick was then working for a music publishing company, Metzler, which obtained a contract to publish Fauré's music during 1896 to 1901. Fauré was a friend of the family and in 1896 vacationed at their residence in Saint-Lunaire, Brittany. From 1898 Maddison and his wife lived separately, with Adela residing in Paris; she may have had a romantic liaison with Fauré.

Frederick Maddison died in Germany on 25 September 1907, at Moabit Hospital, Berlin.
