= Harry Hammond (disambiguation) =

Harry Hammond (1932–2002) was a British street evangelist.

Harry Hammond may also refer to:

- Harry Hammond (footballer) (1868–1921), English footballer
- Harry S. Hammond (1884–1960), American football player and businessman
- Happy Hammond (Harry Hammond, 1917–1998), Australian comedian and children's show host

== See also ==
- Harry Hammond Hess (1906–1969), geologist and United States Navy officer in World War II
- Henry Hammond (disambiguation)
