= Henry Hammond (Australian footballer) =

Australian rules footballer

Personal information
- Full name: Henry Hammond
- Born: 21 November 1881; Granya, Victoria
- Died: 14 July 1961 (aged 79); Queensland

Playing career^{1}
Years	Club	Games (Goals)
1902	South Melbourne	2 (0)
- ^{1} Playing statistics correct to the end of 1902.

Henry Hammond (21 November 1881 – 14 July 1961) was an Australian rules footballer who played with South Melbourne in the Victorian Football League (VFL).
