= Musée des Années Trente =

Museum in Paris, France

Coordinates: 48°50′10″N 2°14′21″E

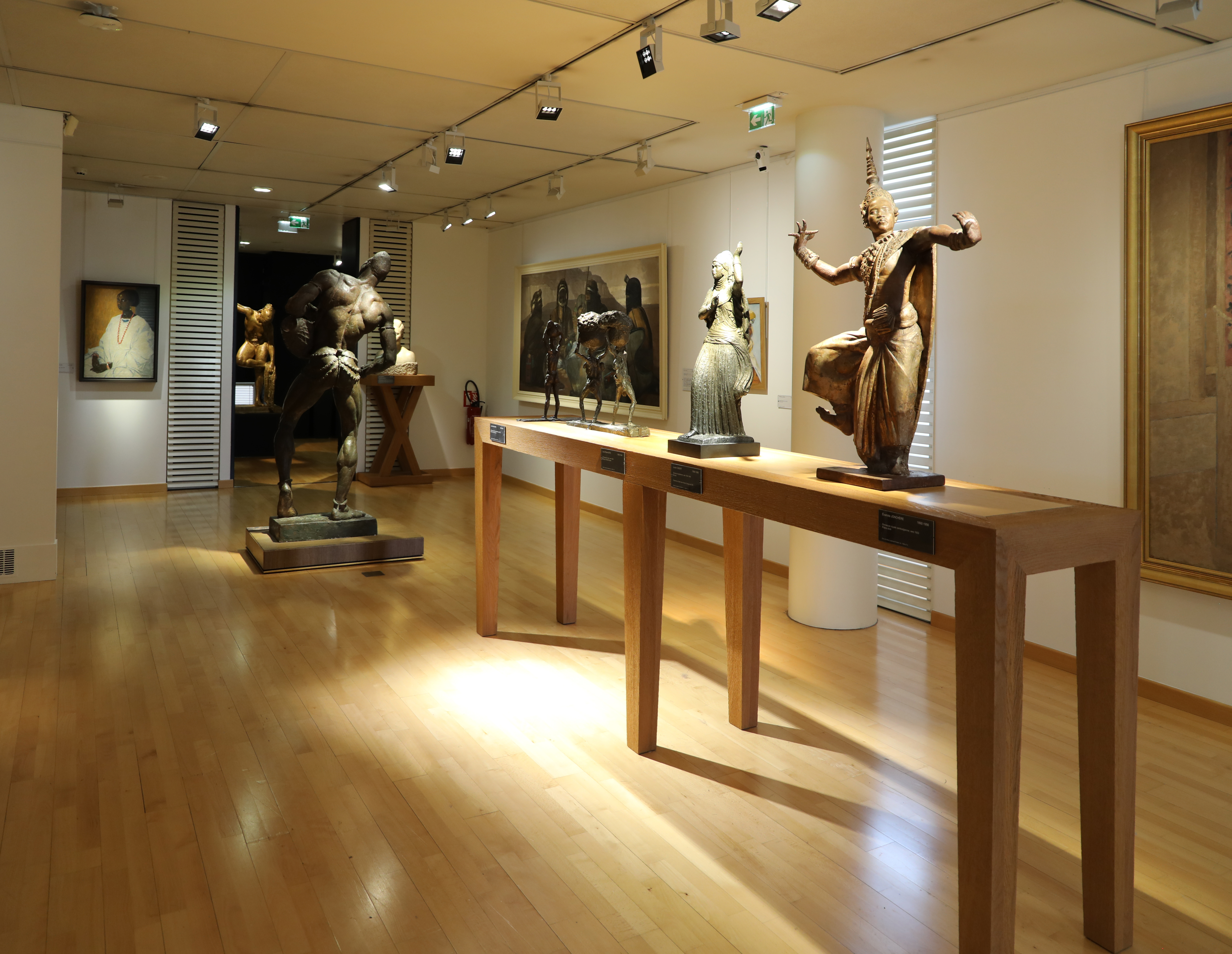
Interior view of the Museum (2025)

The Musée des Années Trente (Museum of the 1930s) is a municipal museum specializing in the fine arts, decorative arts, and industrial arts of the 1930s. It is located in the Espace Landowski at 28, Avenue André-Morizet, Boulogne-Billancourt, a western suburb of Paris, France. It is open daily except Mondays and holidays. The closest Paris Métro station is Marcel Sembat on Line 9.

The museum was begun in 1939 by Dr. Albert Besançon. After his death in 1983, the museum focused upon the 1930s, and in 1994 was moved into the Espace Landowski and given its current name. It now provides 3,000 m² of exhibition space.

Today, the museum holds about 1,500 sculptures, 800 paintings, and 20,000 drawings, plus furniture, ceramics, posters, and original records. It also contains a number of African and overseas works from the former Musée national des Arts d'Afrique et d'Océanie, as well as works by architects Le Corbusier, Tony Garnier, André Lurçat, Robert Mallet-Stevens, Auguste Perret, and Jean Prouvé; designers Émile-Jacques Ruhlmann and Jules Leleu; and notable residents including André Malraux.

== See also ==
- List of museums in Paris
