= Leonard Wilkinson =

English footballer

Personal information
- Full name: Leonard Rodwell Wilkinson
- Date of birth: 15 October 1868
- Place of birth: Highgate, Middlesex, England
- Date of death: 9 February 1913 (aged 44)
- Place of death: Emery Down, Hampshire, England
- Position: Goalkeeper

Senior career*
Years	Team	Apps	(Gls)
- Oxford University
1890–1893	Corinthian		
- Old Carthusians

International career
1891	England	1	(0)
- * Club domestic league appearances and goals

Leonard Rodwell Wilkinson (15 October 1868 – 9 February 1913) was an English barrister and footballer who earned one cap for the national team in 1891.

== Early life ==
Leonard Rodwell Wilkinson was born on 15 October 1868 in Highgate, Middlesex. He was the second of four children and his father was a barrister. Wilkinson attended Woodcote House School and Charterhouse School.

== Football career ==
Wilkinson attended Oxford University and played as a goalkeeper for their football team, also gaining a Blue for athletics. He also played at club level for Corinthian and Old Carthusians.

With Old Carthusians he won the FA Amateur Cup in 1893–94 and 1896–97, and was a runner-up in 1894–95.

He earned one cap for England at international level, appearing for them at the 1891 British Championship against Wales.

== Professional career ==
Wilkinson was a barrister and served as a Justice of the Peace. He also served as a director of gas companies.

== Personal life ==
Wilkinson married in October 1898 and had two sons.

== Later life and death ==
Wilkinson was found shot dead on 9 February 1913 at his home in Emery Down, Hampshire; the Coroner declared he had died by suicide.
