= Alfred Stair =

English football referee (1845–1914)

Alfred Stair (15 May 1845 – 2 March 1914) was an English civil servant, who was the referee at the first three FA Cup Finals, all of which were played in London in 1872, 1873 and 1874. He entered the civil service in 1864 in the Treasury, becoming Principal Accountant in 1887 and Assistant Account-General in 1889. Alfred Stair served as Accountant and Comptroller-General of Board of the Inland Revenue at Somerset House from 1900 to 1910.

He was born on 15 May 1845 in Greenwich, Kent, the third child (and eldest son) of Thomas Stair (1802–1875), Deputy Comptroller-General of the Board of the Inland Revenue, and Ann (née Davis).

In 1872, Alfred Stair officiated in the match between Wanderers and Royal Engineers on 16 March. Like Stair his assistants (Umpires), JH Giffard, for the Royal Engineers, and James Kirkpatrick for the Wanderers, were also civil servants. Alfred Stair, as Treasurer of the Football Association, proposed the institution of the original FA Challenge Cup, to be paid for by a subscription of one guinea from each member club; this was eventually stolen following the 1894–95 FA Cup final.

Stair played football for the amateur club Upton Park from 1867 to 1874 and for the Wanderers. He was also selected as the match referee for the England v Scotland game on 6 March 1875.

Stair married Elisabeth Ann Nield (1845–1934), daughter of Edward Nield (1820–1879), barrister, and Emma Cordingley, and died on 2 March 1914 at The Croft, Saltwood, Kent, aged 68. Alfred and Elisabeth had two sons, Arthur Cecil Stair and Vernon Stair, and four daughters, Gertrude, Maude (who married Sir Archibald Hurd, brother of Sir Percy Hurd), Lilian and Eva.
