= Roger Darvell =

English footballer

Personal information
- Full name: Roger Derek Darvell
- Date of birth: 10 February 1931
- Place of birth: High Wycombe, England
- Date of death: 21 October 2014 (aged 83)
- Place of death: Banbury, England
- Position: Centre-half

Senior career*
Years	Team	Apps	(Gls)
1953–1957	Charlton Athletic	0	(0)
1957–1958	Gillingham	3	(0)
1958–1965	Southport	256	(1)
- * Club domestic league appearances and goals

Roger Darvell (10 February 1931 – 21 October 2014) was an English professional footballer. He played the majority of his career playing at centre-half.

Darvell started his career at Charlton Athletic, where he failed to make a competitive appearance, before moving to Gillingham in 1957. After spending one season at the club and playing just three matches Darvell was transferred to Southport, where he played 256 times and scored one goal. He retired in 1965.

He lived in Banbury in Oxfordshire for many years but suffered a stroke in October 2011, just before he was planning to travel to southport for a club reunion. Housebound for some time he subsequently suffered another major stroke which left him virtually unable to communicate. His last month was spent in Horton hospital Banbury where he died on 21 October 2014 with his wife at his side.
