= Bruce Darvell =

English cricketer

Bruce Stanley Darvell (29 April 1931 – 21 December 2005) was an English cricketer. He was born in Chipperfield in Hertfordshire and played for Kent County Cricket Club and Hertfordshire County Cricket Club.

Darvell was educated at Dartington Hall School near Totnes in Devon before joining Kent's ground staff in 1948. He played six times for Kent's Second XI in 1949 in the Minor Counties Championship taking eight wickets with his off-spin deliveries, but was more successful for the county's Club and Ground team, leading the team's bowling averages in the same season. He spent 1950 and 1951 on National Service in the Royal Army Service Corps before returning to Kent in 1952 when he made two further appearances for the Second XI and his only first-class cricket appearance, playing for Kent against Oxford University at The Parks in Oxford. He failed to take wickets in any of these matches, although he was successful again for the Club and Ground team, and left the county staff at the end of the 1952 season.

After leaving Kent, Darvell played 23 times for Hertfordshire in the Minor Counties Championship between 1956 and 1958, taking 56 wickets for the county in 1956, including 11/106 and 9/105 in two matches against Buckinghamshire.

Darvell worked in recreation management. He died at Welwyn Garden City in Hertfordshire in December 2005 aged 74.
