= Henry Hammond (footballer, born 1866) =

English footballer

Personal information
- Full name: Henry Edward Denison Hammond
- Date of birth: 20 November 1866
- Place of birth: Bath, England
- Date of death: 16 June 1910 (aged 43)
- Place of death: Edinburgh, Scotland
- Position: Right back

Senior career*
Years	Team	Apps	(Gls)
- Oxford University

International career
1889	England	1	(0)
- * Club domestic league appearances and goals

Henry Edward Denison Hammond (26 November 1866 – 16 June 1910) was an English footballer who played as a right back. Hammond played club football for Oxford University and earned one cap for the national team in 1889. After his football career ended, Hammond became a folk music historian.
