= High Wycombe F.C. =

High Wycombe
- Full name: High Wycombe Football Club
- Founded: 1871
- Dissolved: 1892
- Ground: The Rye
- President: Mr E. Wheeler
- Secretary: Arthur Thurlow
| to 1877 colours | from 1877 colours |

High Wycombe F.C. was an English association football based in High Wycombe in Buckinghamshire.

== History ==
The club was formed in 1871 and played its first match in December that year, against Marlow. The match was affected by both a dense fog and "the behaviour of the spectators, who joined to the insolence of the town the coarseness and boorishness of the country rough, and thoroughly impeded the game, on two occasions bringing it to an actual standstill." Like many other provincial clubs, High Wycombe was not a club of those from the public schools; the club's captain and secretary in the late 1870s and 1880s, Arthur Thurlow, was a corn merchant, and most of the players were involved in the chair manufacturing trade.

In then 1872–73 season, the club played 17 matches, with a record of 7 wins, 7 draws, and 3 defeats; all opponents had been clubs local to the town. Perhaps because of this growing reputation, the club entered the 1873–74 FA Cup. The scheduled first round opponents, the Old Etonians, withdrew, as at this time the better players had chosen to play for the Wanderers. The club lost to Maidenhead in the second round, the only goal coming from Wild, following up his own saved shot.

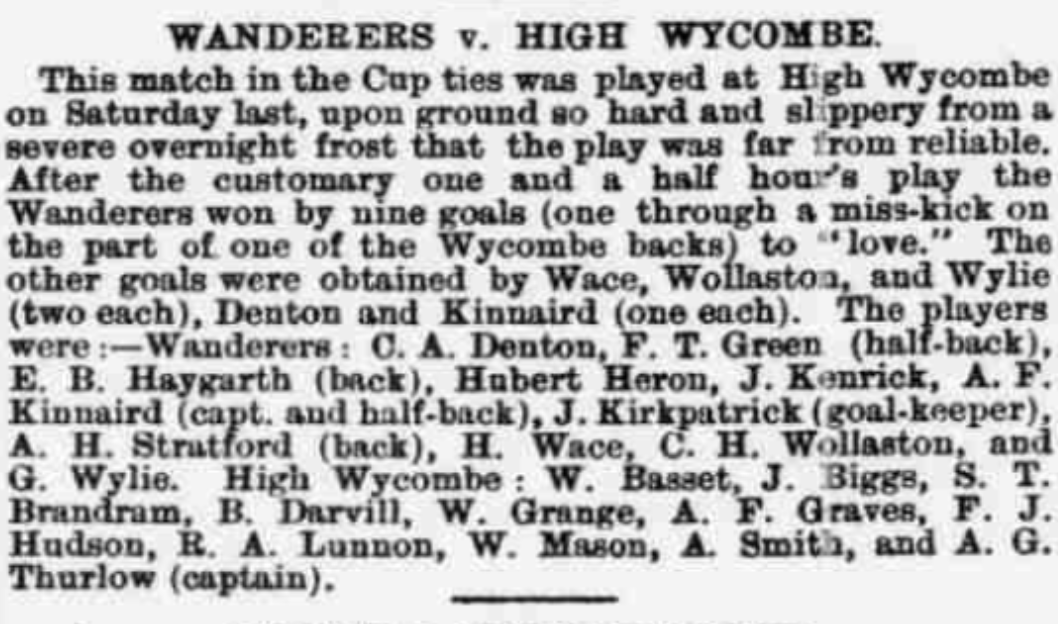
1877–78 FA Cup 2nd round, High Wycombe 0–9 Wanderers, Bucks Herald, 22 December 1877

The club entered the Cup in the next four seasons, suffering a 15–0 defeat to holders the Royal Engineers in 1875–76 and withdrawing the following year to avoid similar humiliation at the hands of Cambridge University, but in 1877–78 the club finally won a tie for the first time, beating Wood Grange at West Ham Park 4–0 in the first round, all of the goals coming in the second half. However, in the second round, the club lost 9–0 at home to the Wanderers, and the result seems to have dissuaded the club from tilting at such top-class windmills again, as for the following season four of its most regular players joined Marlow, and High Wycombe never entered the Cup again.

The club instead continued on a lower level, being one of the founder members of the Berks & Bucks Football Association and was the inaugural winner of the even more local Wycombe Challenge Cup in 1883–84. However, in 1889–90 the club's total gate income was a mere £13 13s, of which over £4 had to go to the cricket club. The association club fizzled out with Wycombe Wanderers becoming the leading club in the town. In 1891, the club started a rugby section, but, at the joint meeting of the football and rugby clubs to discuss fixtures for the 1892–93 season, "there was scarcely a single member of the association club present", and no football matches had in fact been arranged.

== Colours ==
The club's original colours were orange and black, which it changed to navy and red from the 1877–78 season.

== Ground ==
The club originally played at the Rye, a quarter of a mile from High Wycombe railway station, but from 1889 gained use of the cricket ground, on the basis that the club paid over half of the gate money to the cricket club.
