= Sydney Darvell =

Welsh footballer

Personal information
- Date of birth: 17 May 1874
- Place of birth: Wales
- Date of death: 22 June 1944 (aged 70)
- Position: Defender

International career
Years	Team	Apps	(Gls)
1897	Wales	2	(0)

Sydney Darvell (17 May 1874 – 22 June 1944) was a Welsh international footballer. He was part of the Wales national football team, playing 2 matches. He played his first match on 6 March 1897 against Ireland and his last match on 20 March 1897 against Scotland.

== See also ==
- List of Wales international footballers (alphabetical)
