= André Lavrillier =

French medalist (1885–1958)

André Henri Lavrillier (7 May 1885 – 28 January 1958) was a French medalist. He won the Prix de Rome for engraving in 1914. André Lavrillier studied at the Beaux-Arts de Paris in the workshops of Jules Chaplain (1839–1909), Frédéric de Vernon (1858–1912) and Auguste Patey (1855–1930). André Lavrillier won a Second Grand Prix de Rome in 1911, and a Premier Grand Prix de Rome in 1914. He married the Romanian sculptor Margaret Cossaceanu (1893–1980). They are the parents of photographer Carol-Marc Lavrillier (born in 1933).

André Lavrillier is the designer of numerous French medals and coins including a pattern 1933 penny of which only four are known. The most recent sale of a Lavrillier pattern 1933 penny realised £72,000 at Baldwin's Auction House in London in 2016. He is the older brother of Gaston Lavrillier.
