= Brondesbury F.C. =

Brondesbury
- Full name: Brondesbury Football Club
- Founded: 1871
- Dissolved: 1875
- Ground: near Edgware Road station, Kilburn
- Secretary: A. P. Vansittart, J. N. Fulton
Home colours

Brondesbury F.C. was an English association football club based in Brondesbury, London.

== History ==
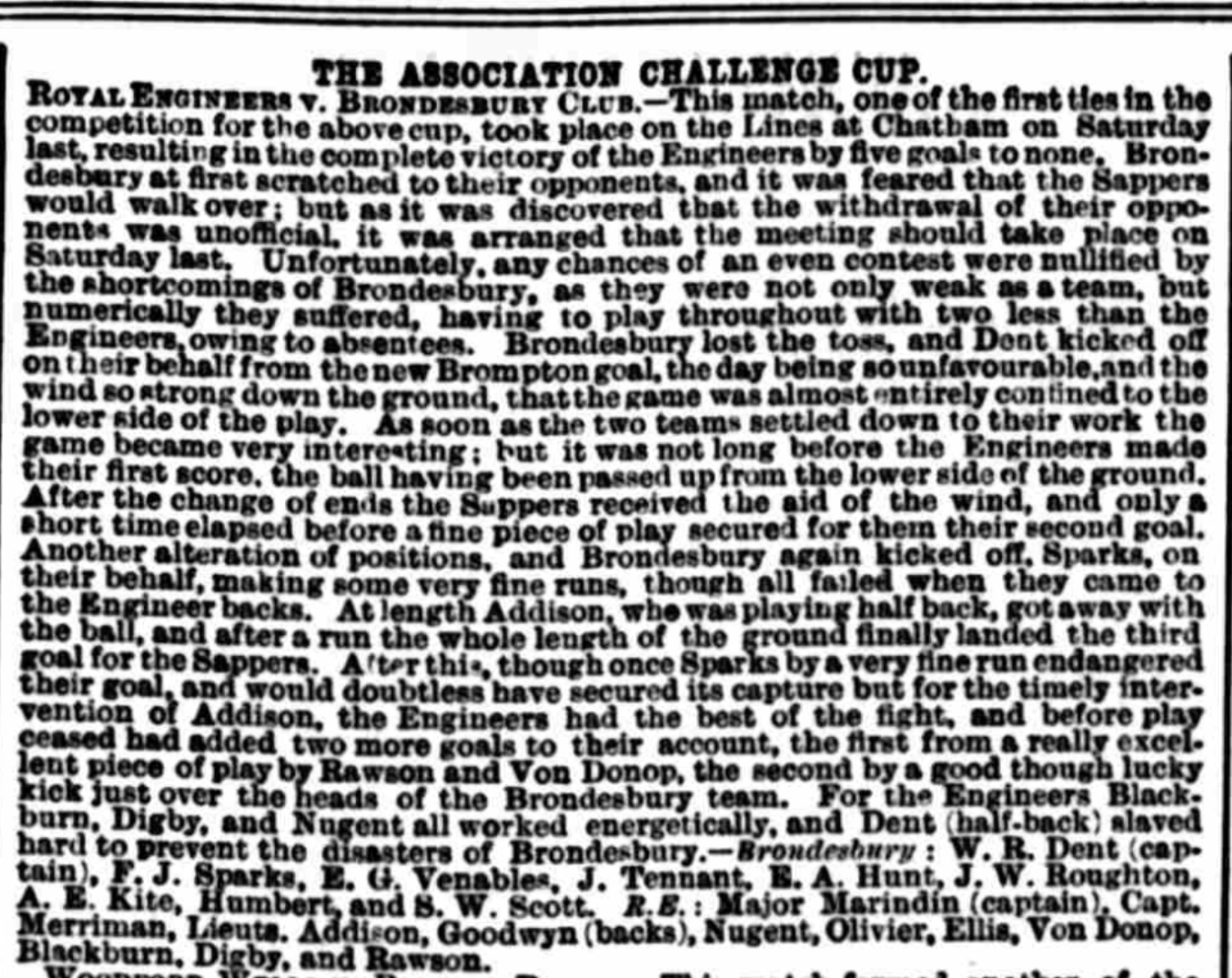
1873–74 FA Cup first round, Royal Engineers 5–0 Brondesbury, Field, 18 October 1873

The club was founded as a revival of the No Names club in 1871 and had its first match - a 1–0 win over a Barnes second eleven - on 25 November 1871.

The club competed in the FA Cup on two occasions during the 1870s. The club's first Cup tie was against the Royal Engineers A.F.C. in 1873, at the latter's Chatham Lines ground; given the Sappers were considered the strongest side in the country, Brondesbury originally tried to withdraw, but, finding that the attempt to do so was not in accordance with regulations, turned up to the match, albeit with only nine players. In the circumstances a 5–0 defeat was no disgrace.

Brondesbury had similar bad luck with the draw the following year, being drawn at Cup holders Oxford University A.F.C. and losing 6–0. The club's captain at the time, Edgar Field, later became an England international.

Although the club started strongly, with 40 members, it never grew, still having 40 members for the 1874–75 season. The last recorded match for the club was on 13 February 1875, a 2–1 win over Hertfordshire Rangers; it had only managed to field ten players in an 11 versus 11 match the previous week against Crystal Palace. For the 1875–76 season, a number of the club's players (including W.R. Sewell, C.G. Field, Francis Sparks, and E. Humbert) joined Herts Rangers, while Field joined Clapham Rovers, with whom he won the FA Cup in 1880.

A new junior club was founded in 1890 with the same name.

== Colours ==
The club's colours were black and blue "stripes", which, in the vocabulary of the time, refers to hoops.

== Grounds ==
The club originally played five minutes from the Edgware Road station in Kilburn, and in 1873 moved to Kensington Park, five minutes from Notting Hill Station, with changing facilities at the ground.

== Records ==
- Best FA Cup performance: 1st Round – 1873/74 and 1874/75
