= Walpole Vidal =

English footballer (1853–1914)

Robert Walpole Sealy Vidal, who from 1892 was Robert Walpole Sealy (3 September 1853 – 5 November 1914) was an English 19th century footballer who featured in the first three FA Cup Finals for two different clubs. In March 1870 he played in the first ever international football match, which took place at Kennington Oval, London. He represented England again in 1871.

== Early life ==
Vidal was born at Cornborough House, Abbotsham near Bideford, Devon, England, and educated at Westminster School, being Captain of School and of the School's football and cricket XIs when he left in 1872. He entered Christ Church, Oxford where he graduated as B.A. in 1876 and M.A. in 1879.

== Football career ==
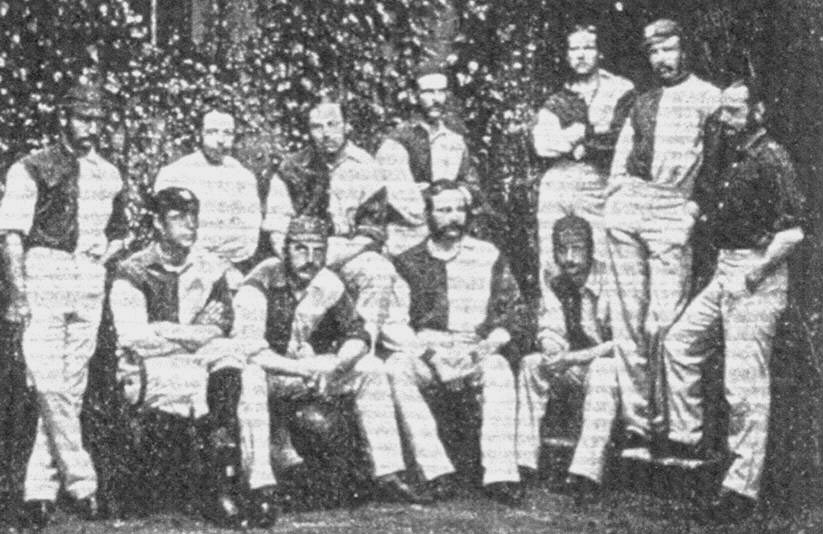
Vidal (standing very left) with Oxford University's F.A. Cup winning side of 1874

Vidal was well known as the "prince of dribblers". In those days, the rule was that the team that scored also kicked off afterwards. On one occasion this rule allowed Vidal to score three goals in a match without the other team touching the ball. He played in the first three FA Cup Finals, of 1872, 1873 and 1874. He was a member of the Wanderers F.C. team when they won the first ever FA Cup. It is said that he assisted the first FA Cup Final goal when at 15 minutes Vidal broke away and looped the ball across to Morton Betts, who shot between the posts. At 18 years 195 days he was the youngest ever player in a Cup Final until surpassed by 17 years old James F. M. Prinsep in 1879 (also the only winning player still at school on Cup Final day).

The following year, Vidal had moved to Oxford. His team reached the Final, held on 29 March 1873 at Lillie Bridge, where they faced Vidal's old side, the Wanderers. However, Oxford could not penetrate the defences and Wanderers won 2–0.

In the next season, Oxford again qualified for the final, this time to face the Royal Engineers at Kennington Oval on 14 March 1874. Vidal played again, setting up Charles Mackarness's goal as Oxford University romped with a 2–0 victory. Vidal became the only person to have played in all three of the first FA Cup Finals. However, he never played in a final again. The University side reached the semi-finals in the next year, 1875, but the Engineers exacted their revenge by winning 1–0.

He only received one cap for England. His cap came in the second official international football match, against Scotland on 8 March 1873 which England won 4–2.

Vidal also played for the Gitanos, Old Westminsters, and Remnants football clubs and in representative matches for London and The South v The North. He was a member of the Football Association committee in 1872 and 1874.

== Other sports ==
Vidal was an Oxford University rugby football Blue in 1873, and was a good oarsman. He also played county cricket for Devon and club cricket for North Devon. He was founder President of Oxford University Golf Club and in later life President of the Royal North Devon Golf Club (also known as Westward Ho!).

== Ecclesiastical career ==
Vidal studied for the Church of England priesthood at Cuddesdon Theological College near Oxford, becoming ordained in 1877. He was Curate of St Edmund's, Salisbury, Wiltshire 1877–1879; Vice-Principal of Ely Theological College 1879–1881; Curate of Holy Trinity, Ely, 1880–81; and ultimately Vicar of Abbotsham, his native parish, from 1881 until his death. Later in his life he was Rural Dean of Hartland in the area his parish stood, and shortly before his death, which followed major breakdown in health, was made Prebendary of Exeter Cathedral. He was buried in Abbotsham Churchyard.

He was also very active in local public affairs in Devon, as chairman of Abbotsham Parish Council, member of Bideford Rural District Council, vice-chairman of Bideford Board of Guardians, member of Devon County Education Committee and a local Commissioner for Income Tax.

== Change of surname ==
On 26 May 1892, Vidal changed his surname back to his family's original name of Sealy, renouncing the surname of Vidal, which his father has assumed following his succession to ownership of the Cornborough estate.

== Titles ==
1853–1877: Mr. Robert Walpole Sealy Vidal

1877–1892: Reverend Robert Walpole Sealy Vidal

1892–1914: Reverend Robert Walpole Sealy

1914: Reverend Prebendary Robert Walpole Sealy

== Honours ==
Wanderers

- FA Cup: 1872

Oxford University

- FA Cup: 1874; runner-up 1873
