= Frederick Patton =

English association football defender

Frederick Joseph Patton was an amateur footballer who played as a forward in the 1870s, and scored for Oxford University A.F.C. in the 1874 FA Cup final.

== Sporting career ==
According to census records, Patton was born in Bombay in 1851.

Patton was captain of the Eton Field Game XI in 1868. He went up to Balliol College in 1870 and played for Oxford University Etonians in Field Game matches against their Cambridge University counterparts in 1870 and 1871, scoring the only two goals in the latter game.

When the university started an association football side, he was one of its founder members. His greatest achievement was scoring the second goal in the 1874 FA Cup final, finishing off a move by Walpole Vidal and Cuthbert Ottaway with a smart shot from a Vidal cross. The following season he represented the Old Etonians in the competition.

After university, Patton became a barrister, and married Edith Furlonger on 1 November 1876 in Surrey. He died in on 5 February 1922 in Ascot, Berkshire, leaving over £2,000 in assets.

== Sporting honours ==
Oxford University

- FA Cup winner: 1874
