= Oxford University A.F.C. =

Association football club in England

Oxford University
- Full name: Oxford University Association Football Club
- Nickname: Blues
- Founded: 9 November 1871; 154 years ago
- Ground: Iffley Road Stadium, Oxford, England
- Capacity: 499
- President: (England) Hannah Byrne
- Sabbatical Officer: (England) Alex Selby
- Captain: (England) Emma Petrie, Erin Creedon and (Wales) Nick Lai
- League: BUCS MARS Midlands Division 1A
- 2023–24: 1st
- Website: ouafc.co.uk
Home colours

Oxford University Association Football Club is an English football club representing the University of Oxford. It is affiliated to the Football Association as the Oxford University FA, and has representation on the FA Council equivalent to a County Football Association.

Oxford University was one of the earliest winners of the FA Cup, having achieved it in 1874 after beating the Royal Engineers. The club currently plays in the BUCS Football League, the league system of British Universities and Colleges Sport (BUCS). In 2020, the club merged with Oxford University Women's Association Football Club (OUWAFC) to create one single entity.

== History ==
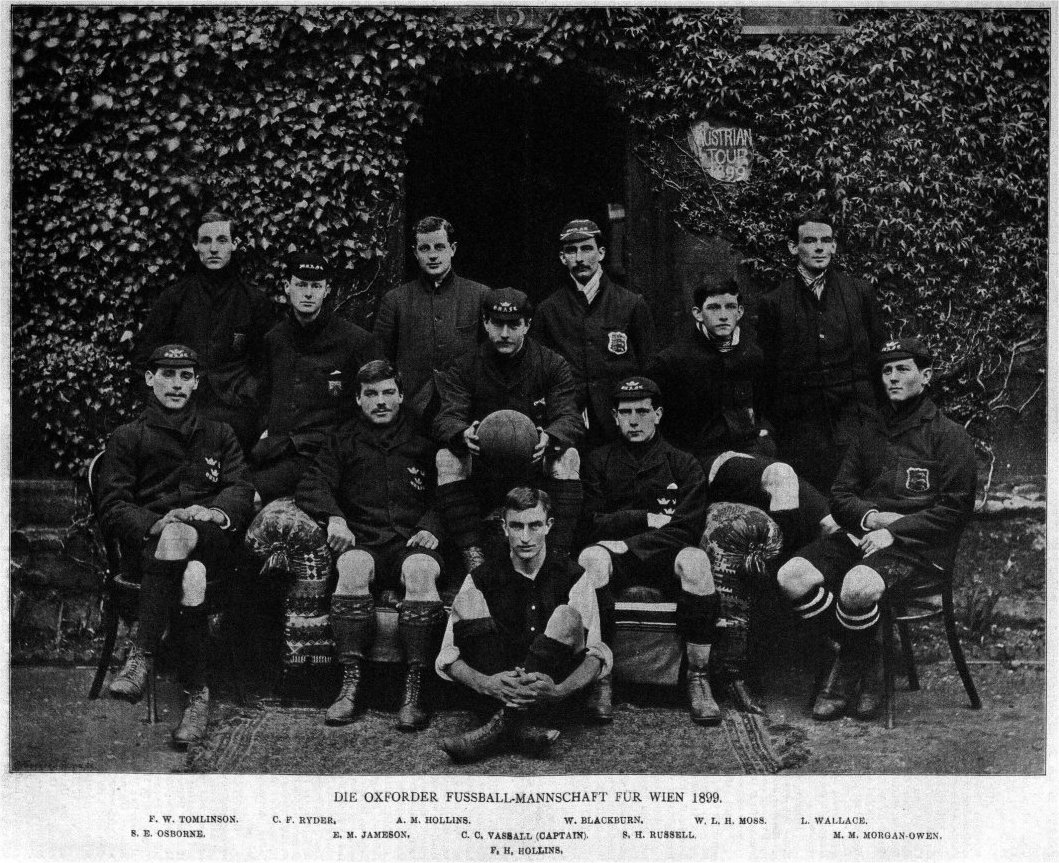
Oxford University AFC before travelling to Austria 1899 . Morgan Maddox Morgan-Owen, seated, bottom right

Formed on 9 November 1871, the club was a giant of the 1870s, winning the FA Cup 2–0 against Royal Engineers in 1874 and finishing the competition as runners-up in 1873, 1877 and 1880, the last year they competed. The club merged with OUWAFC, the women's club, in 2020.

The club left the Iffley Road rugby football ground, which it shared with Oxford University Rugby Football Club, in 1921 and moved to the nearby Iffley Road Stadium.

The club Pegasus of the 1950s was formed from the Oxford and Cambridge University teams.

OUAFC has competed in the British University and College Sports (BUCS) leagues as well as contesting the annual Varsity Football Match against Cambridge University.

== International players ==
=== England ===
Twenty-two Oxford players were capped for England, while registered with Oxford University A.F.C., including three of the team which took part in the first international match on 30 November 1872: Frederick Chappell, Arnold Kirke-Smith and Cuthbert Ottaway.

The full list of England players (with the number of caps received while registered with Oxford University A.F.C.):

- John Bain (1 cap)
- Arthur Berry (1 cap)
- Francis Birley (1 cap)
- William Bromley-Davenport (2 caps)
- Frederick Chappell (1 cap)
- Edmund Currey (2 caps)
- Reginald Erskine 'Tip' Foster (1 cap)
- Henry Hammond (1 cap)
- Elphinstone Jackson (1 cap)
- Robert Stuart King (1 cap)
- Arnold Kirke-Smith (1 cap)
- William Oakley (4 caps)
- Cuthbert Ottaway (2 caps)
- Percival Parr (1 cap)
- George Raikes (4 caps)
- William Rawson (2 caps)
- Gilbert Oswald Smith (7 caps)
- Robert Vidal (1 cap)
- Percy Walters (2 caps)
- Leonard Wilkinson (1 cap)
- Claude Wilson (1 cap)
- Charles Wreford-Brown (1 cap)

=== Wales ===
The following five players were capped for Wales while registered with Oxford University A.F.C.:

- Sydney Darvell (2 caps)
- William Evans (2 caps)
- Alexander Jones (1 cap)
- Hugh Morgan-Owen (6 caps)
- Morgan Morgan-Owen (11 caps)

=== Ireland ===
The following player was capped for Ireland while registered with Oxford University A.F.C.:

- J.V. Nolan-Whelan (4 caps)

== Honours ==
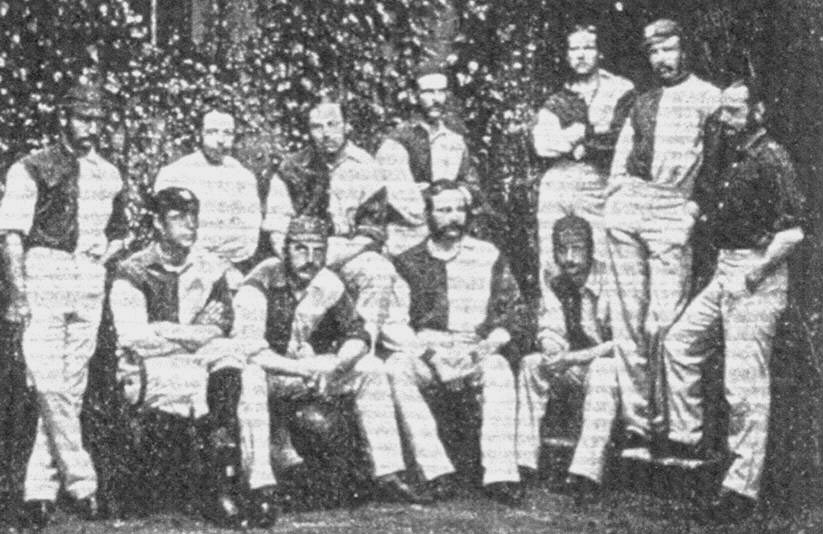
The FA Cup winning side of 1874

- FA Cup: 1874

== See also ==
- Oldest football clubs
