= Meysey-Thompson =

Meysey-Thompson is a surname, and may refer to:

- Albert Meysey-Thompson (1848–1894), English barrister and footballer, son of the 1st Baronet
- Charles Meysey-Thompson (1849–1881), English Anglican priest and footballer, son of the 1st Baronet
- Ernest Meysey-Thompson (1859–1944), British politician, son of the 1st Baronet
- Sir Harry Meysey-Thompson (1809–1874), British politician, 1st Baronet
- Henry Meysey-Thompson, 1st Baron Knaresborough (1845–1929), British politician, son of the 1st Baronet
