= 1872–73 FA Cup =

1872–73 FA Cup (2nd edition)
Tournament details
- Country: England
- Dates: 19 October 1872; 29 March 1873
- Teams: 16

Final positions
- Champions: Wanderers F.C. (2nd title)
- Runners-up: Oxford University A.F.C.
- Semifinalists: Queen's Park F.C.

Tournament statistics
- Matches played: 13
- Goals scored: 36 (2.77 per match)
- Top goal scorer(s): Harold Dixon (Oxford University A.F.C.) (3 goals)

The 1872–73 Football Association Challenge Cup was the second edition of the annual FA Cup, the oldest national football tournament in the world. Sixteen teams entered, one more than the previous season, although two teams never contested a match. It began on 19–26 October 1872 and ended at the final on 29 March 1873.

Wanderers successfully pursued its second Cup title, on 29 March 1873 in Lillie Bridge having been accorded a bye to the final in keeping with the tournament being a "challenge" cup. They were also for the first and only time in Cup history accorded choice of venue.

Oxford University pursued the Cup defeating in the Fourth round Maidenhead, 4–0. They were to contest Queen's Park, who had been accorded a bye to the Semi-final in consideration of reducing traveling costs for the team. Queen's Park withdrew giving Oxford University a walkover to the final that they lost, 2–0. Either 3,000 or 150 attended.

The final had the only morning kick off in Cup history and the low attendance was attributed to attendees not staying the entire match as the Oxford–Cambridge Boat Race was occurring later the same day.

== Format ==
- First round: Fourteen teams (all except Queen's Park and defending champions Wanderers) played and the seven winners advance.
- Second round: Six teams played, the winners advancing. One team would get a bye.
- Third round: The four second-round winners played. The winners advanced.
- Fourth round: The two third-round winners played. The winners advanced.
- Semi-final: The winning team from the fourth round would face Queen's Park. (However, this match was not needed as Queen's Park withdrew.)
- Final: The semi-final winners faced Wanderers, the defending champions.

== Calendar ==
Round	Date	Fixtures					Clubs	New entries this round
Round	Date	Original	Plays	Replays	Walkovers	Byes	Clubs	New entries this round
First round	19–26 October 1872	7	6	0	1	2	16 → 9	14
Second round	23 November – 7 December 1872	3	3	0	0	3	9 → 6	none
Third round	9–21 December 1872	2	2	0	0	2	6 → 4	none
Fourth round	3 February 1873	1	1	0	0	2	4 → 3	none
Semi-final	none	1	0	0	1	1	3 → 2	1
Final	29 March 1873	1	1	0	0	0	2 → 1	1

== First round ==
19 October 1872	Barnes F.C.	0–1	South Norwood F.C.	Barnes Green, Barnes, London
			G.V. Walshe 10'

26 October 1872	Civil Service F.C.	0–3	Royal Engineers A.F.C.	Battersea Park, Battersea, London
			Unknown

26 October 1872	Maidenhead F.C.	1–0	Marlow F.C.	York Road, Maidenhead
	Carter

26 October 1872	Reigate Priory F.C.	2–4	Windsor Home Park F.C.	The Oval, Kennington, London
	Clutton		Ernest Bambridge; George Bambridge; J. Gardiner; Unknown

26 October 1872	1st Surrey Rifles F.C.	2–0	Upton Park F.C.	Barracks in Brunswick Road, Camberwell, London
	R. L. Allport; J. H. Hastie

26 October 1872	Crystal Palace F.C.	2–3	Oxford University A.F.C.	The Oval, Kennington, London
	Armitage; Alfred Soden		Harold Dixon; Charles Longman; John Summer

Clapham Rovers F.C.	w/o from	Hitchin F.C.

Queen's Park F.C.	exempt

Wanderers F.C.	exempt

== Second round ==
23 November 1872	Clapham Rovers F.C.	0–3	Oxford University A.F.C.	Clapham Common, Clapham, London
			Harold Dixon; Kirke Smith; Cuthbert Ottaway

23 November 1872	South Norwood F.C.	0–1 (Note: Originally played 23 November 1872 at the Kennington Oval with Windsor Home Park winning 1–0. After the end of play an appeal was lodged against the Windsor goal by the South Norwood captain. The decision of the committee of the Football Association was that the match should be replayed on or before 7 December 1872.)	Windsor Home Park F.C.	The Oval, Kennington, London
			Unknown

23 November 1872	1st Surrey Rifles F.C.	0–3	Maidenhead F.C.	Barracks in Brunswick Road, Camberwell, London
			Collings; W. Goulden; Charles Hebbes

Royal Engineers A.F.C.	bye

Queen's Park F.C.	exempt

Wanderers F.C.	exempt

=== Replays ===
7 December 1872	Windsor Home Park F.C.	3–0	South Norwood F.C.	The Oval, Kennington, London
	H. Clark; J. Gardiner; Francis Heron

== Third round ==
9 December 1872	Oxford University A.F.C.	1–0	Royal Engineers A.F.C.	Marston Road Sports Grounds, Oxford
	Kirke Smith

21 December 1872	Windsor Home Park F.C.	0–1	Maidenhead F.C.	Slough cricket pitch, Slough
			Charles Hebbes

Queen's Park F.C.	exempt

Wanderers F.C.	exempt

== Fourth round ==
3 February 1873	Oxford University A.F.C.	4–0	Maidenhead F.C.	Marston Road Sports Grounds, Oxford
	Harold Dixon; Cuthbert Ottaway; Walter Paton; Walpole Vidal

Queen's Park F.C.	exempt

Wanderers F.C.	exempt

== Semi-final ==
Oxford University A.F.C.	w/o from	Queen's Park F.C.

Wanderers F.C.	exempt

== Final ==
The final was played at Lillie Bridge, and had a morning kick-off for the only time in Cup history. The attendance was considered low, and of those who did attend, not all stayed for the whole duration of the game. This was attributed to the Oxford–Cambridge Boat Race occurring later the same day.

29 March 1873
11:30

Wanderers F.C.	2–0	Oxford University A.F.C.
Arthur Kinnaird 27'; Charles Wollaston 80'	Report

Lillie Bridge Grounds, West Brompton, London
Attendance: 3000
Referee: Alfred Stair (Upton Park F.C.)

== See also ==
- FA Cup
- FA Cup Final
