= Barbara Lewis Shenfield =

her 1945 election leaflet

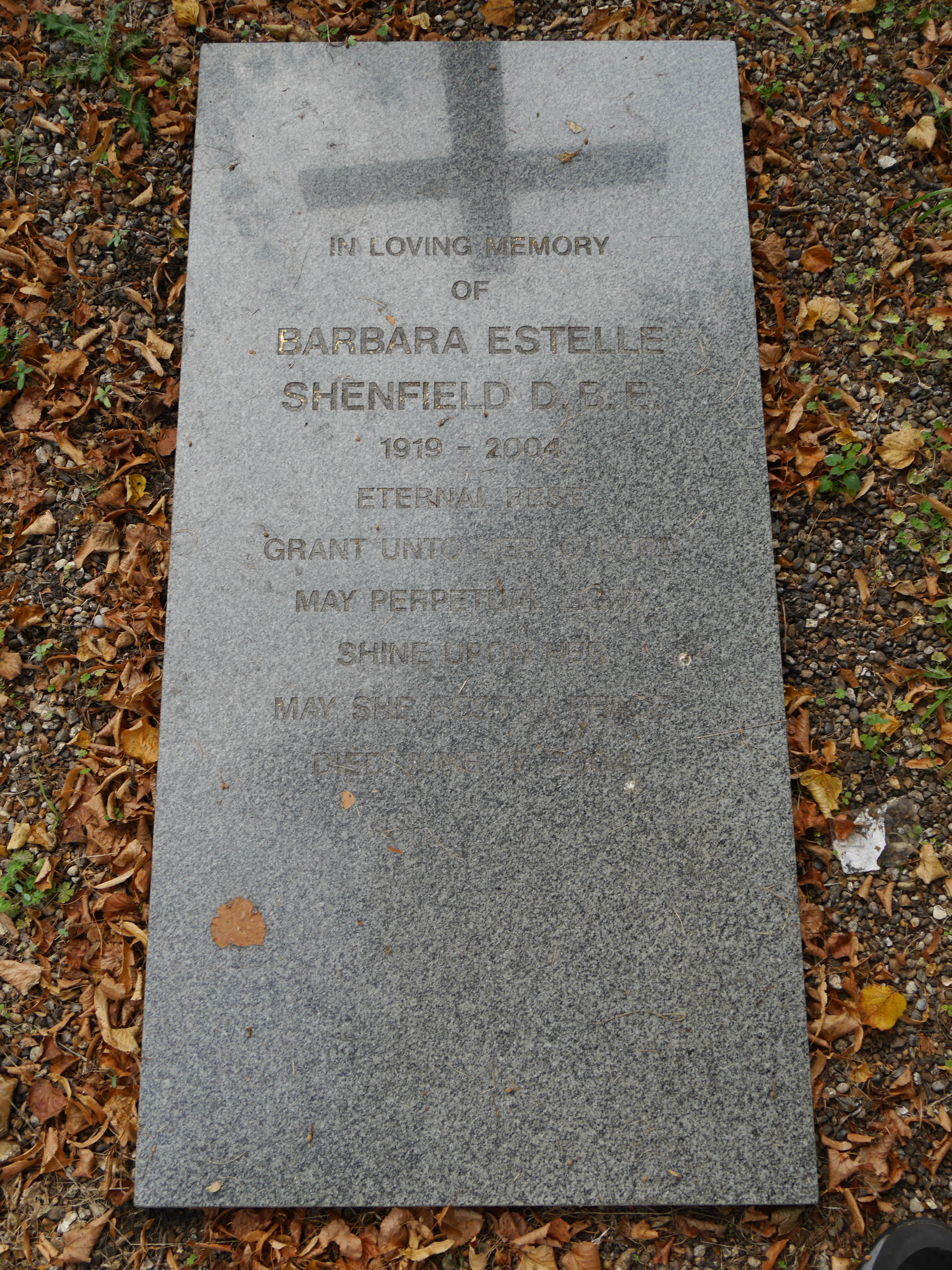
Brompton Cemetery monument

Dame Barbara Estelle Shenfield (née Farrow, later Mrs Lewis; 9 March 1919 – 17 June 2004) was a British academic and Liberal Party politician. She was Chair of the Women's Royal Voluntary Service. She was appointed Dame Commander of the Most Excellent Order of the British Empire in 1986.

== Background ==
Born in Smethwick, Staffordshire to George and Jane Farrow, of Bearwood, she attended Langley High School, Worcester and the University of Birmingham, where she received Honors in Social and Political Science, graduating in three years.

In May 1941 she married Flt-Lt. Gwilym Ivor Lewis who was killed in action in August 1941. Their son, Peter, was born in 1942.

== Professional career ==
During the war she worked in the Women's Land Army. After the war she worked as a University Lecturer in social studies at her alma mater, the University of Birmingham. In 1959, after a three-year break, she worked as a Lecturer at the Department of Economics and Social Studies, Bedford College, London University, until 1965..

She was a member of the Academic Council at the newly established University of Buckingham from 1972 to 1973. She was Visiting Professor in the United States: at Michigan State University in 1960 and Temple University (Philadelphia) in 1974, Distinguished Visiting Professor at Rockford College (Illinois) from 1969 to 1971 and again in 1974. She was Consultant at the US Department of Labor in 1964.

She was Director of PEP Study of Company Boards' Social Responsibilities from 1965 to 1968. She was a Member of the UK Government Committee on Local Taxation from 1965 to 1966, the UK Government Committee on Abuse of Welfare Services from 1971 to 1973 and the Government Review Team on Social Security from 1984 to 1985.

She was Chairman of the National Executive of the National Old People's Welfare Council (later Age Concern) from 1971 to 1973. She was Chairman of the Women's Royal Voluntary Service from 1981 to 1988, in recognition of which she was created Dame Commander of the Order of the British Empire (DBE) in 1986.

She was Chair of the Friends of the Imperial War Museum from 1991 to 2002. She was a member of the Pornography and Violence Res. Trust from 1996 to 2002. She was a Trustee of the Social Affairs Unit from 1990 to 2003.

== Political career ==
She was Liberal candidate for the Handsworth division of Birmingham at the 1950 General Election. She had an uphill battle to win the seat as it had been Conservative for decades;

General election 1945: Birmingham Handsworth
Party	Candidate	Votes	%	±%
Conservative	Harold Roberts	15,607	37.9	
Labour	Cyril Raymond Bence	13,142	34.3	
Independent	Norman Tiptaft	5,112	12.4	
Liberal	Barbara Estelle Lewis	4,945	12.0	
Communist	J Eden	1,390	3.4	
Majority		1,465	3.6	
Turnout			72.5	

She continued her activity in the party and was elected a member of the Liberal Party national executive. She was also involved in party policy development being a joint author of the Liberal report The Aged and the Nation. She did not contest the 1950 General Election. She was Liberal candidate for the Walsall division of Staffordshire at the 1951 General Election;

General election 1951: Walsall
Party	Candidate	Votes	%	±%
Labour	William Thomas Wells	33,556	52.3	
Conservative	F Roper	23,083	36.0	
Liberal	Barbara Estelle Lewis	7,517	11.7	
Majority			16.3	
Turnout			83.1	

She did not stand for parliament again.

== Publications ==
She was a notable writer on social and political affairs. Among her publications were:

- 1957: Social Policies for Old Age: A Review of Social Provision for Old Age in Great Britain
- 1971: The Social Responsibilities of Company Boards
- 1971: Company Boards: Their Responsibilities to Shareholders, Employees, and the Community
- 1972: The Organisation of a Voluntary Service: A Study of Domiciliary Visiting of the Elderly by Volunteers
- 1975: Myths of Social Policy (a Series of Four Lectures Delivered at Rockford College, Rockford, Illinois)

== Arthur Shenfield ==
In 1951, ten years after the death of her first husband, she married Birmingham lecturer Arthur Shenfield (died 1990). A decade her senior, he was also active in the Liberal Party. In 1939 he was prospective parliamentary candidate for Willesden East. Due to the outbreak of war, the election did not take place. By 1945 he had switched to stand as Liberal candidate for Birmingham Edgbaston. Like her, he finished third;

General election 1945: Birmingham Edgbaston
Party	Candidate	Votes	%	±%
Conservative	Sir Peter Frederick Blaker Bennett	21,497	53.5	
Labour	George Corbyn Barrow	12,879	32.0	
Liberal	Arthur Asher Shenfield	5,832	14.5	
Majority		8,618	21.4	
Turnout			69.2	

The Shenfields had one son, Martin. By 1955, Arthur Shenfield had cut his ties with the Liberal Party to become economic director at the Federation of British Industries. Shenfield was a notable writer on economic and political affairs and had published the following works;

- 1962: British Made Abroad
- 1963: The Two Faces of the Common Market
- 1968: The Political Economy of Tax Avoidance (a lecture)
- 1970: The Ideological War Against Western Society
- 1971: The Roots of American Discontent
- 1972: Business and Consumerism
- 1977: The Rise of Trade Union Power in Britain
- 1977: From Campus to Capitol: The Cost of Intellectual Bankruptcy
- 1978: The Uses and Abuses of Eminent Domain
- 1980: The Failure of Socialism: Learning from the Swedes and English
- 1981: Myth and Reality in Economic Systems
- 1983: Myth and reality in anti-trust
- 1983: Icarus: Or the Fate of Democratic Socialism
- 1986: What Right to Strike?
- 1998: Limited Government, Individual Liberty and the Rule of Law
