= Meysey =

Meysey may refer to:

- Henry Meysey-Thompson, 1st Baron Knaresborough (1845–1929), Liberal Party politician in the United Kingdom
- Meysey Hampton, village and civil parish in Gloucestershire, England
- Meysey-Thompson Baronets, of Kirby Hall in the County of York, was a title in the Baronetage of the United Kingdom
