= Walter Paton =

English barrister and youth footballer

Walter Boldero Paton (19 April 1853 – 11 February 1937) was an English barrister who also wrote guides to emigration to the British colonies. In his youth, he was a keen footballer who played for Oxford University in the 1873 FA Cup Final and for England in 1871 in a representative match against Scotland.

== Family and education ==
Paton was born in Hanover Terrace in the Regent's Park area of Westminster, London, the youngest son of George Paton, a barrister, and Laura Coore.

He was educated at Harrow School before going up to University College, Oxford in 1872. He graduated with a BA in 1876 and was awarded his MA in 1879.

Paton was married to Adeline Loftus, the daughter of Capt. Arthur John Loftus and Lady Catherine Loftus, who was the daughter of John Loftus, 2nd Marquess of Ely. His wife was a lady-in-waiting to Queen Victoria from 1889 to 1892.

His brother, Frederick Lechmere Paton, was married to Frederica Chenevix Trench, daughter of Maj.-Gen. Frederick Chenevix Trench and granddaughter of Richard Chenevix Trench, Archbishop of Dublin.

== Football career ==
Paton first made his mark as a footballer during his years at Harrow, becoming team captain. He was still at school, aged only 17 years 214 days, when he was selected to play as a forward for the English XI in a representative match against a Scottish XI on 19 November 1870.

In Charles Alcock's Football Annual, Paton was summed up as "a strong and persevering forward [who] keeps side (the wing) well". Later in his career, he was described as "a very pretty dribbler but disinclined to pass the ball; can play extremely well when he likes".

In February 1873, he scored one of the goals in a 4–0 victory over Maidenhead in the Fourth round of the FA Cup, as a result of which Oxford University reached the FA Cup Final at the first attempt. In the final, the University played the Wanderers who were defending champions and had been given a "bye" direct to the final. Despite having several key players absent, the cup-holders were victorious by a 2–0 margin.

Paton again scored for the University in a 4–0 victory in the First round of the following season's cup tournament, this time against Upton Park although he was not part of the team that won that year's final.

He was also a member of the Wanderers club, as well as Old Harrovians and their sister club Harrow Chequers.

== Legal career ==
On leaving university, Paton qualified as a barrister, becoming a student of the Inner Temple on 21 June 1876 and was called to the Bar on 25 June 1879. He then practised on the Western Circuit until he retired in 1916.

== Publications ==
He was the author of several publications and guides for emigrants from the United Kingdom to then British colonies, including:

- State-aided emigration: published 1885 for the Central Emigration Society.
- The Handy Guide to Emigration to the British Colonies: Containing the rules and regulations ... and other information useful to emigrants, and to persons sending them out: published 1886.
- New Zealand handbook, with map: published 1908 by the Emigrants' Information Office.
- South Australia handbook, with map: published 1908 by the Emigrants' Information Office.
- Handbooks on Canada, Australia, New Zealand and South Africa, with maps: published 1912 by the Emigrants' Information Office.

== Death ==
Paton died, aged 83, at Stanhope Gardens, Kensington, London, on 11 February 1937.

== Sporting honours ==
Oxford University

- 1873 FA Cup Final: runners-up
