= Andrew Leach =

Andrew Leach may refer to:

- Andrew Leach (footballer)
- Andrew Leach (economist)
