= Charles Meysey-Thompson =

English Anglican priest and footballer (1849–1881)

- Born: Charles Maude Thompson; 5 December 1849; York, England
- Died: 11 September 1881 (aged 31); Peoa, Utah, USA
- Education: Trinity College, Cambridge
- Spouse: Emily Walker (m. 1874)
- Children: 1
- Father: Harry Meysey-Thompson
- Relatives: Albert Meysey-Thompson (brother); Henry Meysey-Thompson (brother); Ernest Meysey-Thompson (brother)
Association football career
- Position: Forward
Youth career
- Eton College
College career
Years	Team	Apps	(Gls)
- University of Cambridge
Senior career*
Years	Team	Apps	(Gls)
1872–1873	Wanderers		
1876	Old Etonians		
- * Club domestic league appearances and goals

Charles Maude Meysey-Thompson (né Thompson; 5 December 1849 – 11 September 1881) was an English clergyman who, as an amateur footballer, won the FA Cup in 1873 with the Wanderers. He also played in the 1876 FA Cup Final for the Old Etonians and for the Scottish XI in the last representative match against England in 1872.

== Family and education ==
Born in York, he was the son of Sir Harry Meysey-Thompson, 1st Baronet (1809–1874) and Elizabeth Anne Croft.

His brothers included Henry (who succeeded to his father's title), Albert and Ernest (who became M.P. for Birmingham Handsworth from 1906 to 1922).

Thompson was educated at Eton College before going up to Trinity College, Cambridge where he matriculated in 1868. He graduated in 1872 with a Bachelor of Arts degree, and was awarded his Master's degree in 1876. In 1872, he earned an athletics Blue for Cambridge, but was unplaced in throwing the hammer.

== Football career ==
Thompson played football (as a forward) at Eton College and Cambridge University. Whilst at the university, he was selected as a late replacement for Henry Primrose to represent Scotland in a match against England on 24 February 1872. It would appear that his only connection with Scotland was that the family owned property "north of the border". His brother Albert represented England who won the match by a single goal.

Thompson followed his brother Albert and joined the Wanderers, for whom he made his first appearance on 14 February 1872 in a 6–1 victory over the Civil Service. Despite having only played one other match for them, he was selected for the Wanderers in their defence of the FA Cup in the 1873 FA Cup Final played at Lillie Bridge on 29 March 1873. In the final, the Wanderers defeated Oxford University 2–0, with goals from Arthur Kinnaird and Charles Wollaston.

Thompson played a further four games for the Wanderers at the start of the 1873–74 season and played seven matches for them in total.

He also played for the Old Etonians and in 1876 he was selected to play alongside his brother in the Cup Final match against his former club, the Wanderers. By now, the family had adopted the name "Meysey-Thompson", although Albert played under the name "Thompson" and Charles under the name "Meysey". Two other pairs of brothers played in this match; Francis and Hubert Heron lined up for the Wanderers, while the Etonians' team included Hon. Edward Lyttelton and his brother Hon. Alfred Lyttelton. This is the only occasion that two or more pairs of brothers have played in the same FA Cup Final. The match ended in a 1–1 draw and was replayed a week later; neither Charles nor Albert were selected for the replay (Charles being injured) which ended as a 3–0 victory to the full-strength Wanderers side.

== Later career ==
Thompson was ordained as a Church of England priest and became curate at Whitby in 1873. In 1875, he became curate at St. Pancras in London for a year before being installed as rector at Middle Claydon in Buckinghamshire in 1876. In 1881, he was visiting Utah in the United States in the hope of improving his declining health, but he died at Peoa on 11 September aged 31.

In 1874, he married Emily Mary Walker, daughter of Sir James Walker, 1st Baronet, of Sand Hutton; they had one child, Harold James Meysey-Thompson, born in 1876.

== Honours ==
Wanderers

- FA Cup winner: 1873

Old Etonians

- FA Cup finalist: 1876
