= Wiggin baronets =

Baronetcy in the Baronetage of the United Kingdom

- Escutcheon of the Wiggin baronets of Metchley Grange and Garth Gwynion
- Creation date: 1892
- Status: extant
- Seat: Honington Hall
- Motto: To thine own self be true

The Wiggin Baronetcy, of Metchley Grange in Harborne in the County of Stafford and of Garth Gwynion in Machynlleth in the County of Montgomery, is a title in the Baronetage of the United Kingdom. It was created on 17 June 1892 for Henry Wiggin. He was the founder of Henry Wiggin and Co Ltd, manufacturers of specialty metal products, and also represented Staffordshire East (as a Liberal) and Handsworth (as a Liberal Unionist) in the House of Commons. The second Baronet was High Sheriff of Staffordshire in 1896. The third Baronet was a colonel in the army and served as High Sheriff of Warwickshire in 1942. The fourth Baronet was high sheriff of Warwickshire from 1975 to 1976 and a deputy lieutenant of the county in 1985.

The Conservative politician Sir Jerry Wiggin is the son of Colonel Sir William Henry Wiggin (1888–1951), son of Alfred Harold Wiggin, fourth son of the first Baronet. His son is the Conservative politician Bill Wiggin. Edgar Askin Wiggin (1867–1939), fifth son of the first Baronet, was a Brigadier-General in the Army.

The family seat is Honington Hall, near Stratford on Avon, Warwickshire.

== Wiggin baronets, of Metchley Grange and Garth Gwynion (1892) ==
- Sir Henry Samuel Wiggin, 1st Baronet (1824–1905)
- Sir Henry Arthur Wiggin, 2nd Baronet (1852–1917)
- Sir Charles Richard Henry Wiggin, 3rd Baronet (1885–1972)
- Sir John Henry Wiggin, 4th Baronet (1921–1992)
- Sir Charles Rupert John Wiggin, 5th Baronet (1949–2012)
- Sir Richard Edward John Wiggin, 6th Baronet (born 1980)

The heir presumptive is the present holder's uncle Benjamin Henry Edward Wiggin (born 1951).

== Notes ==
Baronetage of the United Kingdom
Preceded by Powell baronets	Wiggin baronets of Metchley Grange and Garth Gwynion; 17 June 1892	Succeeded by Carbutt baronets
