= Stanhope Gardens =

Stanhope Gardens may refer to:

- Stanhope Gardens, New South Wales, a suburb of Greater Sydney, Australia
- Stanhope Gardens, Kensington, a garden square in London, United Kingdom
