= John Robert Sumner =

English footballer

John Robert Edwards Sumner (14 November 1850 – 15 October 1933) was an amateur footballer who played for Oxford University in the 1873 FA Cup Final. He was later a rancher in the United States.

== Family ==
Sumner was born in Southchurch, Essex, to the Rev. John Henry Robertson Sumner (1821-1910), Rector of Southchurch (and later of Bishopsbourne, Kent, and Ellesborough, Buckinghamshire), and Antonetta Maria Edwards (1825-1852). He was baptised at St Mary's Church, Addington, Surrey, on 17 January 1851.

Sumner's paternal grandfather was John Bird Sumner, Archbishop of Canterbury, whose wife was descended from Francis Lewis, who signed the United States Declaration of Independence on behalf of New York state.

Sumner's mother died on 3 November 1852 and his father later married Elizabeth Ann Gibson.

== Education ==
Sumner was educated at Harrow School, matriculating in October 1869, after which he went up to Trinity College, Oxford, from where he obtained his Bachelor of Arts degree in 1875.

== Football career ==
Having previously played football for Harrow School, Sumner represented Oxford University, where he was described as "most effective", winning praise for his "fine runs", "vigour" and willingness to work hard for the team.

In 1872, the university entered the FA Cup at the first round stage, defeating Crystal Palace 3–2 on 26 October 1872, with Sumner scoring one of the university's three goals. The university won their next three matches to reach the semi-final, where they were drawn against the leading Scottish club, Queen's Park. Queen's Park, however, were unable to raise the funds to travel to London and withdrew from the competition, giving Oxford a bye into the final.

In the final, played at Lillie Bridge on 29 March 1873, the university met the defending champions, Wanderers who, under the original rules of the competition, were exempt from the earlier rounds. Sumner played as one of eight forwards for the university, who dominated much of the match, but conceded a goal after 27 minutes, when the Wanderers captain Arthur Kinnaird outpaced the university's backs and kicked the ball between the goalposts. In a desperate attempt to secure an equalising goal, Oxford took the unusual step of dispensing with the use of a goalkeeper and moved Andrew Leach upfield to play as a forward. This plan back-fired at around the 80-minute mark, however, when Charles Wollaston broke through and scored a second goal for the Wanderers, who thereby retained the trophy.

After leaving university, Sumner played as an amateur for High Wycombe and represented Buckinghamshire.

== Later career ==
Following his graduation in 1875, Sumner worked as a schoolmaster and in 1881 he was teaching at a preparatory school run by Alfred Hyde Harrison at The Lodge, Dunchurch, near Rugby, Warwickshire.

By 1890, he had moved to the Cambridge, Massachusetts in the United States, where he married Abbie Page Carew on 4 June 1890 in Cambridge, Massachusetts. Soon afterward the couple moved to Yampa, Colorado and had two children.

In 1900, he was living at Yampa, Colorado where he appears in the Harrow Register as a "rancher". On 16 July 1915, he and Abbie sold their former home at 29 Everett Street, Cambridge, Massachusetts to Edith Lesley, who had established the Lesley University at the property.

Sumner died at the Scripps Memorial Hospital in La Jolla, near San Diego in California on 15 October 1933.

== Bibliography ==
- Appletons' Annual Cyclopaedia and Register of Important Events of the Year: 1862. New York: D. Appleton & Company. 1863.
- Collett, Mike (2003). The Complete Record of the FA Cup. Sports Books. ISBN 1-899807-19-5.
- Gibbons, Philip (2001). Association Football in Victorian England – A History of the Game from 1863 to 1900. Upfront Publishing. ISBN 1-84426-035-6.
- Warsop, Keith (2004). The Early F.A. Cup Finals and the Southern Amateurs. Soccer Data. ISBN 1-899468-78-1.
