= Charles Longman =

English footballer and publisher (1852–1934)

Charles James Longman (14 April 1852 – 17 April 1934) was a member of the Longman publishing family, who also played in the second FA Cup final for Oxford University.

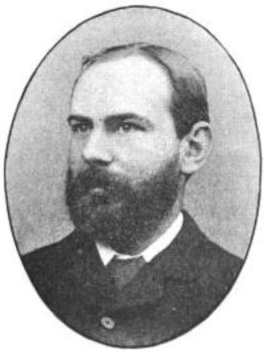
Charles James Longman (1852–1934) in 1899.

== Early life ==
Longman was born in Hyde Park Square in 1852, and was the second son of William Longman, who ran the Longman firm with his brother at the time. Charles was educated at Harrow School, boarding at The Park from 1864. He was a member of the school shooting eleven. He matriculated at University College, Oxford in 1870; he received his Bachelor of Arts in 1874 and his Master of Arts in 1877.

== Football career ==
Harrow School was one of the private schools which had an emphasis on football, and Old Harrovians were instrumental in the development of association football, so Longman had a grounding in the necessary skills at the start of the game itself. However he did not make the Harrow side, and his first appearance of any note was as a forward for Oxford University in the 1872–73 FA Cup first round win over Crystal Palace, scoring the third goal with a "clever side-kick". He distinguished himself in the final, being one of four players singled out for their abilities, but, despite this, the university lost 2–0 to the Wanderers.

Longman did not in fact appear for the university again; he was not selected for the Varsity matches, which started in 1874. He played for the Harrow Chequers in 1874–75 and 1875–76, as well as representing Middlesex in county matches, but with the Chequers not yet entering the FA Cup, he played for Herts Rangers in the 1875–76 FA Cup. In the second round, he played for the Rangers team which lost to Oxford University side, which included his brother Henry in the half-back line.

Familial loyalties evidently proved strong as 1876–77 Henry joined Charles in the Rangers side, and both scored in a 9–0 win over South Norwood, but school loyalties proved even stronger; in the 1876–77 FA Cup both appeared for the Old Harrovians (the renamed Chequers) in the first round tie at the Kennington Oval against the Royal Engineers. Henry Longman scored the Harrovians' goal in a 2–1 defeat. It was the brothers' last FA Cup tie and Charles appears to have given up the game after a goalless draw against the Sappers at Chatham Lines in March 1877, probably due to his taking up a senior role at the family firm.

== Archery career ==
Longman was a member of the Royal Toxophilites archery society and won the Grand National Archery Meeting at Cheltenham in 1883; his score of 869 was 55 clear of the field. He remained competitive until 1892 (when winning a prize at a Midland Counties contest) and co-wrote the volume on archery in the Badminton Library.

== Publishing career ==
Longman's father died in 1877, and Charles succeeded to his role; although not the head of the house or company, he was the most active. Among the works he commissioned or started were the Badminton Library of sporting books, the Andrew Lang fairy books, the English Historical Review, and Longman's Magazine. He also wrote a history of the company.

Longman was one of the closest friends of H. Rider Haggard and the two often holidayed together. He was the first president of the Publishers' Association, a post he held four times. He was also made a freeman of the City of London in 1898.

In 1889, he married Harriet Evans, daughter of Sir John Evans, and was a keen golfer into his eighties. He died on 17 April 1934 in Paddington, one of his two homes, and was survived by his son William (also a partner in the firm) and daughter; he left an estate worth £61,624 4/9.
