= William Bailey (engineer) =

British engineer and businessman (1838–1913)

Sir William Henry Bailey
- Born: 10 May 1838; Salford, Lancashire
- Died: 22 November 1913 (aged 75); London, Middlesex
- Occupations: Engineer; Businessman; Politician

Sir William Henry Bailey (10 May 1838 – 22 November 1913) was a British engineer, businessman and local politician, knighted by Queen Victoria for his work on the creation of the Manchester Ship Canal.

Bailey was born on 10 May 1838 in Salford, England to John Bailey and Elizabeth Ann Bailey.

He was elected to membership of the Manchester Literary and Philosophical Society on 7 February 1888 and President of the Society 1905–07.

There is an engine manufactured by WH Bailey and company on display at Science and Industry Museum Manchester

He was involved in the local politics of the Borough of Salford, being first an alderman, and later elected Mayor of the borough in 1893.

He was knighted by Queen Victoria on the royal yacht in 1894 when the Queen opened the Manchester Ship Canal. Sir William was one of the promoters of the Canal, and was a member of the Provisional Committee.

Bailey died in London on 22 November 1913.

Professional and academic associations
Preceded by Sir William Boyd Dawkins	President of the Manchester Literary and Philosophical Society; 1905–07	Succeeded by Harold Baily Dixon
