= Norman Tiptaft =

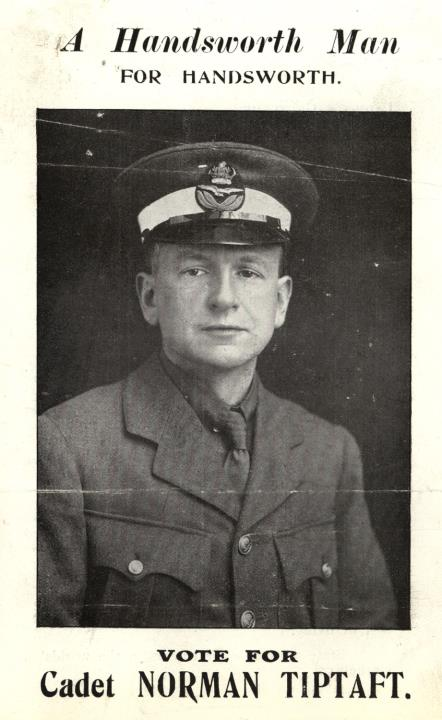
- Norman Tiptaft's General Election Poster, 1918
- Position held: Lord Mayor of Birmingham (1941–1942)

Norman Tiptaft (1883 - 13 Oct 1970) was a British businessman, politician and author, who served as Lord Mayor of Birmingham.

Tiptaft became the managing director of Tiptaft Ltd, in Birmingham, and joined the Independent Labour Party (ILP). The ILP was affiliated to the Labour Party, for which Tiptaft stood in the 1913 Birmingham City Council election. He supported British involvement in World War I, and therefore left the ILP, although initially remained a socialist, active in the Fabian Society.

During World War I he served as a cadet in the Royal Flying Corps.

At the 1918 UK general election, Tiptaft stood in Birmingham Handsworth. He was an independent candidate, standing with backing of the local branch of the National Federation of Discharged and Demobilized Sailors and Soldiers. He took second place with, 22.1% of the vote. He was elected to the city council in 1919, and by the 1922 UK general election, he was the leader of the Progressive group on the council. He stood again in Handsworth and, facing a single opponent, he increased his vote share to 40.4%.

By 1935, Tiptaft had joined the Conservative Party, and moved to represent Gravelly Hill on the council. He chaired the Birmingham Civil Defence Committee from 1938 until 1941, then served as Lord Mayor of Birmingham in 1941–1942. Later in World War II, he was chair of the city's Reconstruction Committee. At the 1945 UK general election, he again stood in Handsworth, this time as a "National Independent", on this occasion coming third with only 12.4% of the vote.

Tiptaft wrote numerous books, including The City Father, Business or Bankruptcy, I Saw a City, The Book of Dam-All (a compilation of pieces for The Birmingham Weekly Post), The Lord Mayor Said, So This Is Birmingham, Inns of the Midlands, The Individualist, Socialism for Commercial Travellers, Religion in Birmingham, and his autobiography, The Man Who Went on Business.

He died in 1970.
