= Henry Wiggin =

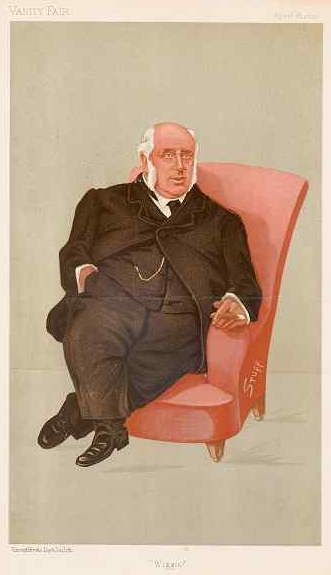
Wiggin caricatured in Vanity Fair by "Stuff", April 1892

Sir Henry Samuel Wiggin, 1st Baronet, DL (14 February 1824 – 12 November 1905) was an English metals manufacturer and Liberal Party (and later Liberal Unionist Party) politician.

== Biography ==
Wiggin was born on 14 February 1824 in Cheadle, Staffordshire, the son of William Wiggin of Cheadle.

William's friend Charles Askin was a partner with Brooke Evans in a nickel and cobalt refining and manufacturing business in Birmingham, and Henry joined the company in 1842. Henry became a partner in 1848 after Askin's death. The company name, originally Evans and Askin, was changed to Evans and Wiggin around 1865 and to Henry Wiggin and Company in 1870.

He was also a Director of the Midland Railway, the Staffordshire Water Works Co., the Birmingham Joint Stock Bank, and Muntz's Metal Co. He was a governor of King Edward's School, Birmingham, a J.P. for Worcestershire and Birmingham, and Deputy Lieutenant of Staffordshire.

In 1880 Wiggin was elected as a Member of Parliament (MP) for East Staffordshire and held the seat until the reorganisation of 1885. He was then elected MP for Handsworth and held the seat until 1892. He became a baronet on 17 June 1892.

Wiggin married Mary Elizabeth Malins 11 June 1851, and lived at Metchley Grange, Harborne, Birmingham. He died on 12 November 1905 aged 81, when his son, Henry Arthur Wiggin, succeeded to the baronetcy.

== Portrait ==
An oil portrait of Wiggin hangs in the Marriot Hotel in central Birmingham. For at least two decades the sitter's identity was lost, but was re-established in 2014.

== See also ==
- Brightray (alloy developed by Henry Wiggin and Co)
- Nimonic (family of alloys developed by Henry Wiggin and Co)

Parliament of the United Kingdom
Preceded by Michael Bass and Samuel Allsopp	Member of Parliament for East Staffordshire; 1880 – 1885; With: Michael Bass	Constituency abolished
New constituency	Member of Parliament for Handsworth; 1885 – 1892	Succeeded by Sir Henry Meysey-Thompson
Baronetage of the United Kingdom
New creation	Baronet (of Metchley Grange and Garth Gwynion); 1892–1905	Succeeded by Henry Wiggin
