= Edward Boyle, Baron Boyle of Handsworth =

British politician and Vice-Chancellor of the University of Leeds

The Right Honourable The Lord Boyle of Handsworth CH PC
- Boyle in 1969

Shadow Secretary of State for Education and Science
- In office 16 February 1965 – 15 October 1969
- Leader: Alec Douglas-Home; Edward Heath
- Preceded by: Quintin Hogg
- Succeeded by: Margaret Thatcher

Shadow Home Secretary
- In office 29 October 1964 – 16 February 1965
- Leader: Alec Douglas-Home
- Preceded by: Henry Brooke
- Succeeded by: Peter Thorneycroft

Minister of State for Education and Science
- In office 1 April 1964 – 16 October 1964
- Prime Minister: Alec Douglas-Home
- Preceded by: Office established
- Succeeded by: Reg Prentice

Minister of Education
- In office 13 July 1962 – 31 March 1964
- Prime Minister: Harold Macmillan; Alec Douglas-Home
- Preceded by: David Eccles
- Succeeded by: Quintin Hogg (as Secretary of State for Education and Science)

Financial Secretary to the Treasury
- In office 22 October 1959 – 13 July 1962
- Prime Minister: Harold Macmillan
- Preceded by: Jocelyn Simon
- Succeeded by: Anthony Barber

Parliamentary Secretary to the Ministry of Education
- In office 18 January 1957 – 22 October 1959
- Prime Minister: Harold Macmillan
- Preceded by: Dennis Vosper
- Succeeded by: Kenneth Thompson

Economic Secretary to the Treasury
- In office 7 April 1955 – 11 November 1956
- Prime Minister: Anthony Eden
- Preceded by: Reginald Maudling
- Succeeded by: Derek Walker-Smith

Parliamentary Secretary to the Ministry of Supply
- In office 28 July 1954 – 7 April 1955
- Prime Minister: Winston Churchill
- Preceded by: Toby Low
- Succeeded by: Frederick Erroll

Member of Parliament for Birmingham Handsworth
- In office 16 November 1950 – 29 May 1970
- Preceded by: Harold Roberts
- Succeeded by: Sydney Chapman

Personal details
- Born: Edward Charles Gurney Boyle; 31 August 1923 Kensington, London, UK
- Died: 28 September 1981 (aged 58)
- Education: Christ Church, Oxford

Edward Charles Gurney Boyle, Baron Boyle of Handsworth, CH, PC (31 August 1923 – 28 September 1981), known as Sir Edward Boyle, 3rd Baronet, between 1945 and 1970, was a British Conservative Party politician and Vice-Chancellor of the University of Leeds.

== Early life and career ==
Boyle was born in Kensington, London, the eldest son of Sir Edward Boyle, 2nd Baronet, and succeeded to his father's baronetcy in 1945. He was educated at Eton College and graduated from Christ Church, Oxford, in 1949 with a third-class BA (later converted to an MA) in history. From 1942 to 1945, he was a temporary junior administration officer at the Foreign Office. He worked at Bletchley Park in intelligence.

== Political career ==
The then Sir Edward Boyle entered Parliament in 1950 as MP for Birmingham Handsworth, a seat he would hold until his retirement in 1970. He served as Parliamentary Private Secretary to the Under-Secretary of State for Air from 1951 to 1952 and to the Under-Secretary of State for Defence in 1952, Parliamentary Secretary to the Minister of Supply from 1954 to 1955, Economic Secretary to the Treasury from 1955 to 1956 (he resigned from this role in protest of the Suez Crisis), Parliamentary Secretary to the Minister of Education from 1957 to 1959, Financial Secretary to the Treasury from 1959 to 1962, Minister of Education from 1962 to 1964 and Minister of State for Education and Science in 1964. In 1957 he opened the new teaching block and science block extension at Abingdon School.

== University of Leeds ==
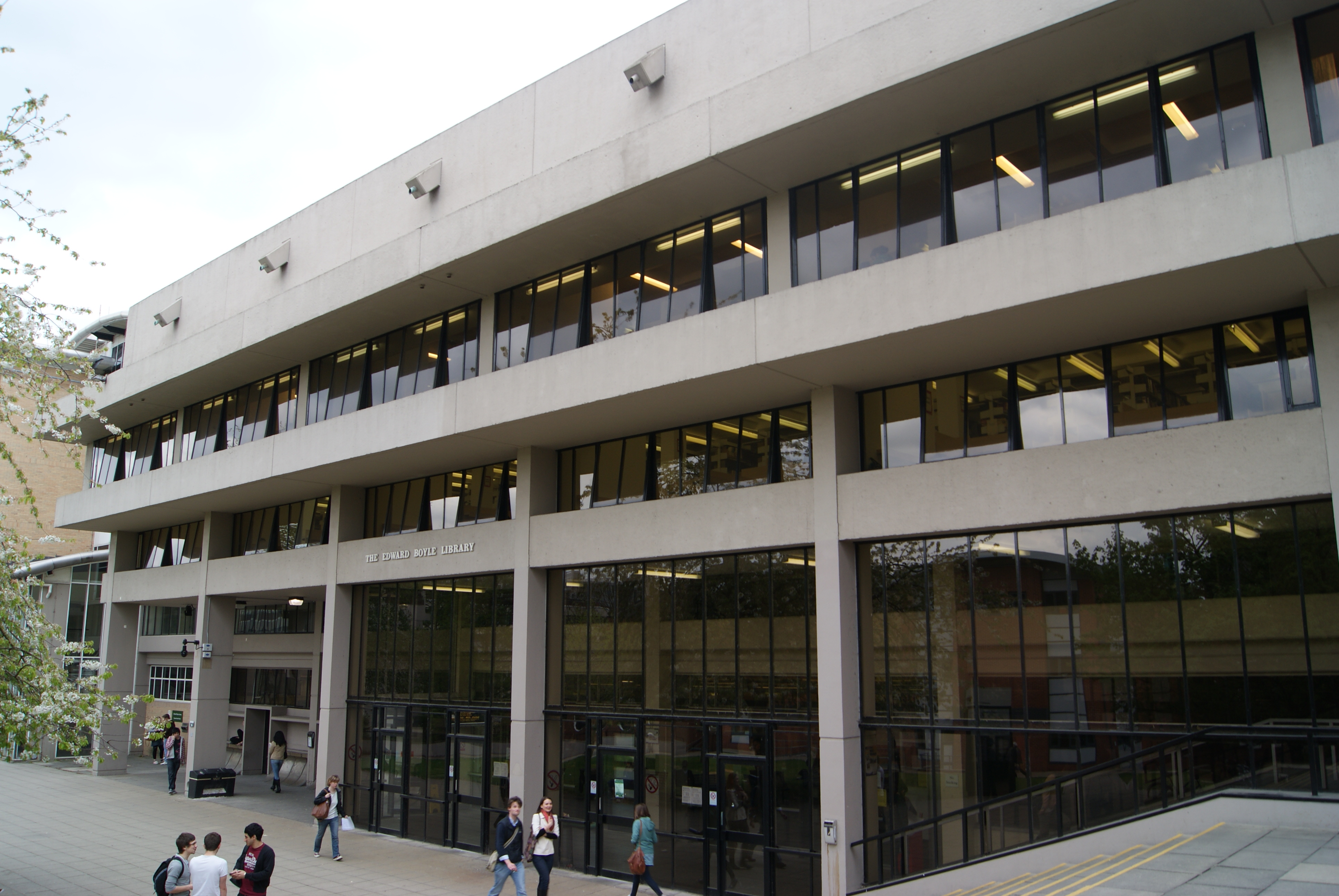
The Edward Boyle library at the University of Leeds was named in his honour.

Boyle was appointed Vice-Chancellor of the University of Leeds in 1970. He was a Trustee of the British Museum from 1970 to 1981 and Chairman of the Committee of Vice-Chancellors and Principals of UK Universities from 1977 to 1979.

In 1977 he had been due to deliver the Reith Lectures for the BBC. Despite 2 years preparation time, he withdrew with 3 months notice.

Boyle died from cancer in Leeds on 28 September 1981, aged 58. He was unmarried and childless and whilst his life peerage became extinct at his death, his baronetcy passed to his brother, Richard.

== Honours ==
On his retirement from parliament in 1970, Boyle was awarded a life peerage as Baron Boyle of Handsworth, of Salehurst in the County of Sussex.

Boyle was awarded the honorary degree of Doctor of Laws (LLD) by the following universities:

- University of Leeds (1965)
- University of Southampton (1965)
- University of Bath (1968)
- University of Sussex (1972)
- University of Liverpool (1981)

Boyle also received an Honorary Doctorate from Heriot-Watt University in 1977.

Boyle was appointed a Member of the Order of the Companions of Honour (CH) on in the 1981 Birthday Honours.

Flanders and Swann satirically cited "Edward Boyle's Law" : The greater the external pressure, the greater the volume of hot air.

Coat of arms of Edward Boyle, Baron Boyle of Handsworth
Crest In front of a lion's head couped Argent a staff fesswise Gules. Escutcheon Per bend raguly Gules and Argent two staves raguly in bend counterchanged. Supporters Dexter an owl Proper, sinister a lion Argent. Motto God's Providence Is My Inheritance

== Edward Boyle Memorial Trust Foundation Scholarship ==
The Edward Boyle Memorial Trust was established in the wake of the death of the Lord Boyle, in September 1981.

Its aims were the advancement of education, learning and music and its guidelines are as follows:

- support will be given to talented young people at a time when they are in most need;
- the Trust does not intend to do what institutions or individuals should do for themselves. It will help those with proven talent who have shown that they deserve help and are prepared to make their own substantial contribution;
- the Trust will support originality and excellence;
- administration costs will be kept to a minimum;
- because some donors have indicated ways in which they wish their contributions to be used the Trustees will endeavor to meet their requests.

The Trust offered the following support:

- Ove Arup/Edward Boyle Scholarships, intended for students from Hong Kong, Singapore or Malaysia following an undergraduate course in mechanical or electrical and electronic engineering, and
- Medical Elective Bursaries intended for Commonwealth students.

== Publications ==
- The politics of education: Edward Boyle and Anthony Crosland in conversation with Maurice Kogan (Penguin education specials), ed. M. Kogan, Harmondsworth : Penguin, 1971.
- The Bedside 'Guardian' 22 (1972–73). Introduction, London: Collins, 1973.

Parliament of the United Kingdom
Preceded by Harold Roberts	Member of Parliament for Birmingham Handsworth; 1950–1970	Succeeded by Sydney Chapman
Political offices
Preceded by Reginald Maudling	Economic Secretary to the Treasury; 1955–1956	Succeeded by Derek Walker-Smith
Preceded by Jocelyn Simon	Financial Secretary to the Treasury; 1959–1962	Succeeded by Anthony Barber
Academic offices
Preceded by Roger Stevens	Vice-Chancellor, University of Leeds; 1970–1981	Succeeded by William Walsh (acting)
Baronetage of the United Kingdom
Preceded by Edward Boyle	Baronet (of Ockham); 1945–1981	Succeeded by Richard Boyle
