= Oliver Locker-Lampson =

British politician (1880–1954)

Lieutenant Commander Oliver Locker-Lampson CMG DSO
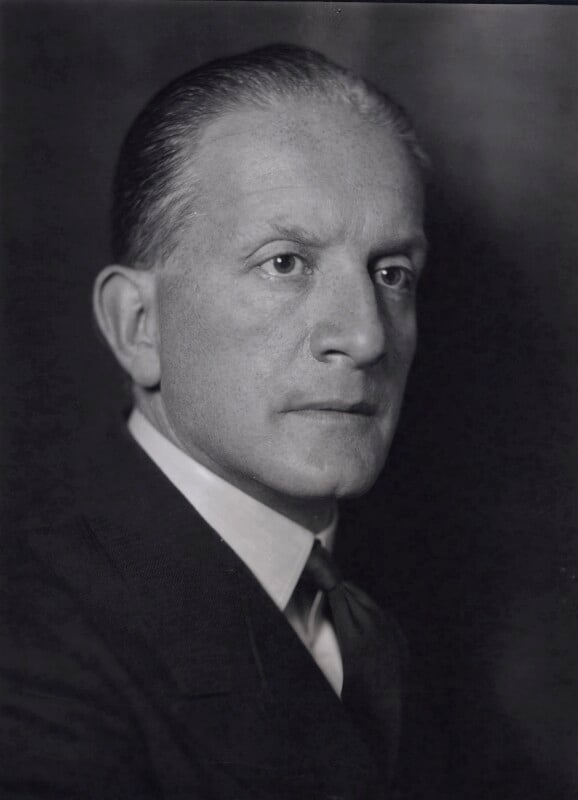
- Locker-Lampson c. 1930s

Member of Parliament for Ramsey
- In office 15 January 1910 – 25 November 1918
- Preceded by: Alexander Boulton
- Succeeded by: Constituency abolished

Member of Parliament for Huntingdonshire
- In office 14 December 1918 – 26 October 1922
- Preceded by: Constituency established
- Succeeded by: Charles Murchison

Member of Parliament for Birmingham Handsworth
- In office 15 November 1922 – 15 June 1945
- Preceded by: Ernest Meysey-Thompson
- Succeeded by: Harold Roberts

Personal details
- Born: Oliver Stillingfleet Locker-Lampson; 25 September 1880 Belgravia, London
- Died: 8 October 1954 (aged 74) Kensington, London
- Party: Conservative
- Spouses: Bianca Jacqueline Paget (m. 1923; died 1929) Barbara Goodall (m. 1935)
- Parents: Frederick Locker (father); Hannah Jane Lampson (mother)
- Education: Cheam School
- Alma mater: Trinity College, Cambridge

Military service
- Allegiance: United Kingdom
- Branch/service: Royal Navy
- Rank: Lieutenant commander
- Unit: Royal Naval Air Service
- Commands: RNAS Armoured Car Section
- Awards: Distinguished Service Order

Lieutenant Commander Oliver Stillingfleet Locker-Lampson, CMG, DSO (25 September 1880 – 8 October 1954) was a British politician and naval reserve officer. He was Member of Parliament (MP) for Ramsey, Huntingdonshire and Birmingham Handsworth from 1910 to 1945 as a Conservative.

He was the brother of Godfrey Locker-Lampson MP and cousin of the diplomat Miles Lampson.

== Birth and education ==
He was the younger son of the poet Frederick Locker, and his second wife, Hannah Jane Lampson, daughter of Sir Curtis Lampson Bt. (Frederick Locker took the name Locker-Lampson as a condition of his father-in-law's will.) His ancestors included Captain William Locker, Edward Hawke Locker, Benjamin Stillingfleet and Jonathan Boucher. Locker-Lampson was educated at Cheam School, Eton and Trinity College, Cambridge where he gained an Honours Tripos Degree in History and Modern Languages. While at Cambridge, he was co-editor of Granta with Edwin Montagu and President of the Amateur Dramatic Club.

After Cambridge he studied law at the Inner Temple and was called to the Bar in 1907 but never practised. Instead he worked as a journalist for several years and was also a founding director of a Norwich-based motorcar vendor, Duff, Morgan and Vermont. As an MP, he did not wish his name to appear in the company name, so he used the home state of his maternal grandfather, Vermont. In 1911 he was the victim of a practical joke by an old school friend, Horace de Vere Cole. Cole challenged Locker-Lampson to a footrace on a London street, and allowed him to pull ahead. Then he shouted "Stop thief! He's got my watch!" - having previously slipped his gold watch into Locker-Lampson's pocket.

== Parliamentary career ==
Locker-Lampson was elected to the House of Commons at the January 1910 general election as the member for the Ramsey Division in Huntingdonshire, defeating the Liberal incumbent. He stood as a Conservative Unionist on a Tariff Reform ticket. He was re-elected in the December 1910 general election. With the outbreak of the First World War, there were no elections held until 1918, and he continued as an MP throughout this period although absent on active service abroad for much of 1915 to 1918.

Before the 1918 general election, constituencies were redrawn and the Ramsey Division was abolished. A new all Huntingdonshire seat was created, and Locker-Lampson stood for this instead, and was elected.

He was Parliamentary Private Secretary to the Chancellor of the Exchequer Austen Chamberlain from 1919 to 1921, and accompanied Chamberlain to the Paris Peace Conference in 1919.

In the 1922 election he moved to Birmingham Handsworth and was elected there. He held Birmingham Handsworth from 1922 until the 1945 general election, when he was de-selected by the constituency party.

== Political activity before the First World War ==
Locker-Lampson's early political career was taken up with a number of causes. He was appointed by the Conservative and Unionist Party to raise money for the Unionist Working Men's Candidates Fund. He was also involved in a secret plan by Arthur Steel-Maitland and Conservative Central Office to gain control of the Daily Express, but was outmanoeuvred by the future Lord Beaverbrook.

However, his main political preoccupation before 1914 was harrying Asquith's Liberal government over the selling of honours and the Marconi scandal. He also opposed Irish Home Rule, and raised funds for Edward Carson's Pro-Unionist Ulster Volunteer Force.

== Great War service ==
In December 1914 Locker-Lampson received a commission in the Royal Navy Volunteer Reserve with the rank of Lieutenant Commander. This was largely on the basis of an understanding with the First Lord of the Admiralty, Winston Churchill, that he would personally fund the establishment of an armoured car squadron for the Royal Naval Air Service's Armoured Car Division. After training at Whale Island, Hampshire and in north Norfolk near his family home, Newhaven Court, Cromer, Locker-Lampson's No. 15 Squadron was sent to France, then operated in the unoccupied portion of Belgium on attachment to the Belgian Army during much of 1915.

By the end of 1915, trench warfare meant there was no scope for armoured cars on the Western Front and most of the RNAS's armoured car squadrons were disbanded by the Admiralty. However, three squadrons of RNAS armoured cars were assembled and sent by ship to Archangel as the Armoured Car Expeditionary Force (ACEF), also known as the Russian Armoured Car Division, with Locker-Lampson in command in order to show support for Britain's Russian ally. Sea ice prevented the Division from reaching Archangel and men and armoured cars were landed at the small town of Alexandrovsk. The ACEF operated with the Russian Army in several areas, including Galicia, Romania, and the Caucasus.

Locker-Lampson became somewhat entangled in Russian politics at this time. He said later that he had been asked to participate in the 1916 assassination of Rasputin, and that he had a secret plan to get Tsar Nicholas II out of Russia after his abdication in March 1917. It is also alleged that in September 1917 he was involved in Kornilov's attempted coup against the provisional government of Kerensky.

After the Bolshevik Revolution of October 1917, the ACEF was withdrawn from Russia. In 1918 selected personnel and armoured cars transferred to the Machine Gun Corps and served as 'Duncars' within Dunsterforce in Persia and Turkey, though without Commander Locker-Lampson, who in 1918 became the Ministry of Information's Russian Representative.

== Post-First World War career ==
Partly because of his experiences in Russia, Locker-Lampson became fiercely anti-Communist and suspicious of covert Bolshevik influence in Britain's economy, society and politics. In the 1920s he organised several mass rallies under the banner 'Rout the Reds', many of which were stewarded by members of Rotha Lintorn-Orman's British Fascisti. He also expressed admiration for Adolf Hitler in the Daily Mirror, touting the future leader of Nazi Germany as "a legendary hero" and "the most masterly expounder and contriver in the length and breadth of the Reich". In 1931, he founded the "Sentinels of Empire", also known as the Blue Shirts, a quasi-paramilitary organisation "to peacefully fight Bolshevism and clear out the Reds!" Their motto was his family motto "Fear God! Fear Naught!" Their anthem, "March On", with words written by Locker-Lampson, music originally from the film High Treason, was sold as sheet music and as a 78-rpm record. A phonograph record of the anthem was sent to Mussolini, along with silver and blue-enamelled cufflinks and badge, as a gift from the Blue Shirts.

Although Locker-Lampson claimed that the organisation had 100,000 members, the Blue Shirts were short-lived and appeared to make little impact. Nevertheless, they did attract the praise of the Nazi philosopher Alfred Rosenberg, who in 1931 had lunch with Locker-Lampson at the Savoy during a visit to London. This was organised by the MI6 spy F. W. Winterbotham who was investigating the Nazis at the time, posing as an admirer who could help the Nazis make links with prominent figures in Britain. Locker-Lampson's Blue Shirts apparently "delighted Rosenberg, and when he heard that their objective was to counter Communist propaganda he was even more enthusiastic", and Rosenberg later sent him a gold cigarette case as a "token of his esteem". Locker-Lampson returned the gift with some embarrassment. From 1933 onwards, Locker-Lampson redirected his political ire against fascism both in Britain and in continental Europe. In July 1933 he introduced a Private member's bill to extend British citizenship to Jewish refugees from Nazi persecution, though it failed to become law. In September, he provided Albert Einstein with refuge at a camp on Roughton Heath near his home in Cromer in north Norfolk, after Einstein had received death threats while living in Belgium. A TV drama-documentary released worldwide by Netflix on 17 February 2024 included scenes recreating the Roughton Camp with actor Andrew Havill in the role of Oliver Locker-Lampson. He later worked to help other high-profile victims of fascism, including Haile Selassie and Sigmund Freud, as well as numerous ordinary Jewish people, whom he personally sponsored in order they might escape Nazi persecution in Germany and Austria. Some have called his efforts "exceptional in how he saved Jews from Germany."

In 1934 he introduced a Ten Minute Rule Bill to ban the wearing of political uniforms - aimed at Oswald Mosley's Black Shirts (British Union of Fascists). The Bill did not become law, but a similar bill sponsored by the government did become law in 1936. In 1935 he was a founding member of Focus, a cross-party group opposed to the prevailing policy of appeasement of German and Italian aggression. In 1936 he was instrumental in the successful prosecution of the British fascist Arnold Leese for his publication of anti-Semitic literature. Throughout the 1930s he was one of the few Conservative MPs to continue to support Winston Churchill during his "wilderness years" of political isolation.

Age and ill-health prevented him from taking a very active part in the Second World War, though he joined the Home Guard and continued to support Winston Churchill vociferously from the backbenches. He retired from politics at the 1945 General Election.

== Personal life ==
The Locker-Lampson family's principal home was Rowfant in West Sussex. Following his mother's death in 1915 Oliver's older brother Godfrey inherited Rowfant while Oliver inherited the family's summer home, Newhaven Court in Cromer. He was married twice. His first wife, Bianca Jacqueline Paget, whom he married in 1923, died in 1929. He married his second wife, Barbara Goodall, in 1935. They had two sons, Jonathan and Stephen.

Oliver Locker-Lampson is buried in Worth churchyard near Crawley, Sussex.

Parliament of the United Kingdom
Preceded by Alexander Boulton	Member of Parliament for Ramsey; January 1910 – 1918	Constituency abolished
New constituency	Member of Parliament for Huntingdonshire; 1918 – 1922	Succeeded by Charles Murchison
Preceded by Ernest Meysey-Thompson	Member of Parliament for Birmingham Handsworth; 1922 – 1945	Succeeded by Harold Roberts
