= Sheila Wright =

Member of Parliament for Birmingham Handsworth
- In office 3 May 1979 – 13 May 1983
- Preceded by: John Lee
- Succeeded by: Constituency abolished

Personal details
- Born: Sheila Rosemary Rivers Wright; 22 March 1925 Cawnpore, India
- Died: 5 July 2013 (aged 88)
- Party: Labour
- Education: University of Southampton, University of London

Sheila Rosemary Rivers Wright (22 March 1925 – 5 July 2013) was an Indian-born British Labour Party politician.

== Early life ==
Shelia Wright was born in March 1925 in Cawnpore, India, where she was also raised. Her father was an inspector general of police until his death when Sheila was 12 years old. She was subsequently raised by her mother, who also managed a sick animal sanctuary. Initially taught by her nanny and governesses until age 11, she then taught herself politics, philosophy and history.

She left India just after the Second World War in Europe and ended and lived in Southampton. She gained a social science certificate from the University of Southampton in 1951 and a sociology degree from the University of London in 1956.

== Personal life ==
She married and, although her name changed to Gregory, she retained her maiden name in politics.

== Career ==
Wright became a social worker and served as a councillor on Birmingham City Council 1956–79, becoming an honorary alderman. As chair of the Birmingham Education Committee, she oversaw the introduction of the comprehensive education system.

Wright was elected as the Member of Parliament (MP) for Birmingham Handsworth at the 1979 general election. She served until 1983, when boundary changes abolished the seat and although she had been selected for the Birmingham Ladywood seat, she gave up the nomination due to family matters. She continued to perform voluntary work for the Birmingham central health authority and on numerous school governing bodies throughout Birmingham.

== Death ==
Wright died in July 2013 at the age of 88 after a long illness.

Parliament of the United Kingdom
Preceded by John Lee	Member of Parliament for Birmingham Handsworth; 1979–1983	Constituency abolished
