= John Lee (Labour politician) =

British politician (1927–2020)

Member of Parliament for Birmingham Handsworth
- In office 28 February 1974 – 7 April 1979
- Preceded by: Sydney Chapman
- Succeeded by: Sheila Wright

Member of Parliament for Reading
- In office 31 March 1966 – 29 May 1970
- Preceded by: Peter Emery
- Succeeded by: Gerard Vaughan

Personal details
- Born: 13 August 1927
- Died: 14 April 2020 (aged 92)
- Party: Labour
- Spouse: Margaret Russell (m. 1960)
- Children: 2
- Education: Christ's College, Cambridge; University of London

John Michael Hubert Lee (13 August 1927 – 14 April 2020) was a Labour Party politician in the United Kingdom.

== Biography ==
Lee was born in Bagshot, Surrey, the son of a left-wing mother and "right-wing Liberal" father who worked as a sales manager in the City. As a boy he was influenced by the radical sermons of the Archbishop of Canterbury, William Temple. He was educated at Reading School, Christ's College, Cambridge, where he read history, and the School of Oriental and African Studies, University of London. He then became a barrister, called to the bar at the Middle Temple in 1960. From 1951 to 1958 he worked in the Colonial Service in the Gold Coast, now Ghana. Later he worked in the Ministry of Communications, before joining the BBC legal department in 1959.

Lee had supported the radical-left Common Wealth Party during wartime, but later reconciled himself to Labour and became a party member in 1955. He first contested the parliamentary constituency of Reading at the 1964 general election without success, but defeated the Conservative incumbent, Peter Emery, in the 1966 election. He served as Member of Parliament (MP) for Reading until his defeat at the 1970 election. He was subsequently elected MP for Birmingham Handsworth in February 1974, but ongoing illness and a parliamentary trip to the Western Pacific in 1975 that had left him "absolutely shattered" prompted him to stand down at the 1979 election, when he was succeeded by Sheila Wright. During the first year of his second term in Parliament he was Chairman of the West Midlands Group of Labour MPs.

Lee stood broadly on the left of the Labour Party and was a member of the Tribune Group. He was noted for his provocative statements in the House of Commons, telling other MPs during a debate on the Vietnam War (which he opposed) that "Everything I hear of the Americans makes we wish we had nothing further to do with them." He once went so far as to endorse assassination as a legitimate tool of foreign policy, arguing that it should be considered "if the object of the assassination is a sufficiently vicious and obnoxious person", a description which included the "racist rulers of South Africa" and "Stalinists behind the Iron Curtain". He was opposed to Britain's membership of the European Economic Community (EEC) and advocated the withdrawal of troops from Northern Ireland. He also developed a reputation for integrity, once reporting himself to the Inland Revenue when it under-assessed his tax liability.

In 1978, Lee was appointed a Deputy Circuit Judge on the Midland and Oxford Circuit, and from 1981 to 1987 he was an Assistant Recorder. He continued working on legal aid briefs until he finally retired at the age of 79. In 2012 he was interviewed as part of The History of Parliament's oral history project. By this time he had left the Labour Party, resigning in 2005 in protest at its treatment of Walter Wolfgang during that year's party conference.

In 1960, Lee married Margaret Russell, who was a Conservative supporter; they had two children. He died on 14 April 2020 at the age of 92.

Parliament of the United Kingdom
Preceded by Peter Emery	Member of Parliament for Reading; 1966–1970	Succeeded by Gerard Vaughan
Preceded by Sydney Chapman	Member of Parliament for Birmingham Handsworth; Feb 1974–1979	Succeeded by Sheila Wright
