= Albert Meysey-Thompson =

English barrister and footballer (1848–1894)

- Born: Albert Childers Thompson; 13 July 1848; Near Little Ouseburn, England
- Died: 20 March 1894 (aged 45); Marylebone, London, England
- Education: Trinity College, Cambridge
- Father: Harry Meysey-Thompson
- Relatives: Charles Meysey-Thompson (brother); Henry Meysey-Thompson (brother); Ernest Meysey-Thompson (brother)
Association football career
- Positions: Half-back; full-back
Youth career
- Eton College
College career
Years	Team	Apps	(Gls)
- University of Cambridge
Senior career*
Years	Team	Apps	(Gls)
1872	Wanderers		
1875-1876	Old Etonians		
- * Club domestic league appearances and goals

Albert Childers Meysey-Thompson (13 July 1848 – 20 March 1894) was an English barrister and amateur footballer who played for Wanderers in the 1872 FA Cup Final and for Old Etonians in the 1875 and 1876 FA Cup Finals.

== Family and education ==
Born at Kirby Hall near Little Ouseburn, as Albert Childers Thompson, he was the son of Sir Harry Meysey-Thompson, 1st Baronet (1809–1874) and Elizabeth Anne Croft.

Albert's brother Charles played for Wanderers in the 1873 FA Cup Final and the Old Etonians in the first match of the replayed 1876 FA Cup Final.

Thompson was educated at Eton College and Trinity College, Cambridge, where he graduated B.A. in 1871. He began studying law at Lincoln's Inn in 1869, before migrating to the Inner Temple in 1872.

== Sports career ==
Thompson had played football at Eton, and continued while in university for Cambridge University and the Eton Cambridge Football Club.

He played at half-back or full-back. C.W. Alcock variously described him as "...the king of backs. The ease with which he kicks the ball in the most difficult positions suggests the belief that at one time in his life he must have gone into training with a view to an acrobatic career." He was also praised as "the best half-back out, an unerring kick and the most reliable back against any team", while in 1876 it was said: "Still holds his own as a half-back; one of the most brilliant kickers of the day".

At the first F.A. Cup Final of 1872, the combination of himself and full-back Edgar Lubbock at play with faultless kicking was said to be a great feature of the match as they repulsed all attempts by the Royal Engineers team to score against the Wanderers, who won 1–0.

His next two Cup Finals were played for the Old Etonians. He was in their team in the 1–1 drawn first match between them and the Royal Engineers on 13 March 1875 at Kennington Oval, but was unavailable for the replay three days later when the Engineers defeated them in his absence. History repeated itself the following year, when they played against the Wanderers, when again they drew 1–1. In the same match his brother Charles was a teammate on the left but neither brother appeared in the replay, when Wanderers beat them 3–0.

Thompson appeared in both the England v Scotland representative international matches in 1872. He also played in representative matches for London and the counties of Middlesex and Surrey.

He was also a cricketer and a member of the M.C.C.

== Legal career and later life ==
Thompson was called to the bar on 6 June 1872 and practised as a barrister on the North-Eastern Circuit, becoming a Q.C.

He died, aged forty-five, at his home in Marylebone, London, on 20 March 1894, three days after returning home from the West Coast of the United States where he wintered because of failing health over his last three years. He was buried in the parish churchyard at Holy Trinity, Little Ouseburn, Yorkshire.

== Sports honours ==
Wanderers

- F.A. Cup winner: 1872

Old Etonians

- F.A. Cup finalist: 1875, 1876
