= Brightray =

Brightray is a nickel-chromium alloy that is noted for its resistance to erosion by gas flow at high temperatures. It was used for hard-facing the exhaust valve heads and seats of petrol engines, particularly aircraft engines from the 1930s onwards. It was developed by Henry Wiggin and Co at Birmingham.

As well as its use as a coating, it is also used in wire and strip form for electrical heating elements.

The original Brightray alloy was composed of 80% nickel / 20% chromium. This alloy is still in use today as Brightray S and can be used at temperatures up to 1050°C. Several other variants are now available. These include nickel-iron-chromium Brightray F that offers better resistance to both reducing and oxidizing environments. Brightray C is a nickel-chromium alloy with rare-earth additions to extend its lifetime under fluctuating temperatures, particularly with heating elements that are being continually switched on and off.

== See also ==
- Nimonic
