= Nimonic =

Nickel-chromium alloy used in the Whittle jet engine

Nimonic is a family of nickel-based high-temperature low creep superalloys. Nimonic alloys typically consist of more than 50% nickel and 20% chromium with additives such as titanium and aluminium. The term is a registered trademark of Special Metals Corporation.

The main use is in gas turbine components and extremely high performance reciprocating internal combustion engines. The Nimonic family of alloys was first developed in the 1940s by research teams at the Wiggin Works in Hereford, England, in support of the development of the Whittle jet engine.

== Development ==
Working at Inco-Mond's Wiggin facility at Birmingham in the United Kingdom, Leonard Bessemer Pfeil is credited with the development of Nimonic alloy 80 in 1941, and used in the Power Jets W.2B. Four years later, Nimonic alloy 80A followed, an alloy widely used in engine valves today. Progressively stronger alloys were subsequently developed: Nimonic alloy 90 (1945), Nimonic alloy 100 (1955), and Nimonic alloys 105 (1960) and 115 (1964 - Prof John Gittus FREng. DSc. D Tech 1986.).

== Properties and uses ==
Due to its ability to withstand very high temperatures, Nimonic is ideal for use in aircraft parts and gas turbine components such as turbine blades and exhaust nozzles on jet engines, for instance, where the pressure and heat are extreme. It is available in different grades, including Nimonic 75, Nimonic 80A, and Nimonic 90. Nimonic 80a was used for the turbine blades on the Rolls-Royce Nene and de Havilland Ghost, Nimonic 90 on the Bristol Proteus, and Nimonic 105 on the Rolls-Royce Spey aviation gas turbines. Nimonic 263 was used in the combustion chambers of the Rolls-Royce/Snecma Olympus 593 used on the Concorde supersonic airliner. The heads of the exhaust valves as well as the turbine wheel of its Rajay turbocharger for the Corvair Spyder turbo engine were made of Nimonic 80A. Most Saab cars with high output turbos use exhaust valves made of Nimonic 80A as well.

Nimonic 75 has been certified by the European Union as a standard creep reference material.

== See also ==
- Brightray
