= Sydney Chapman (politician) =

British politician (1935–2014)

Sir Sydney Chapman

Vice-Chamberlain of the Household
- In office 15 April 1992 – 7 July 1995
- Prime Minister: John Major
- Lord Cham.: The Earl of Airlie
- Preceded by: John Taylor
- Succeeded by: Timothy Kirkhope

Member of Parliament for Chipping Barnet
- In office 3 May 1979 – 11 April 2005
- Preceded by: Reginald Maudling
- Succeeded by: Theresa Villiers

Member of Parliament for Birmingham Handsworth
- In office 18 June 1970 – 8 February 1974
- Preceded by: Edward Boyle
- Succeeded by: John Lee

Personal details
- Born: Sydney Brookes Chapman; 17 October 1935 Macclesfield, England
- Died: 9 October 2014 (aged 78) Lower Heyford, England
- Party: Conservative
- Spouses: Claire McNab (m. 1976; div. 1987) Teresa Munoz (m. 2005)
- Children: 3 (by McNab)
- Education: Rugby School
- Alma mater: University of Manchester
- Profession: Architect
- Awards: Knight Bachelor (1995)

Sir Sydney Brookes Chapman (17 October 1935 – 9 October 2014) was a British Conservative Party politician and architect who served as Member of Parliament (MP) for Birmingham Handsworth and Chipping Barnet.

== Life ==
Chapman was educated at Rugby School and Manchester University, where he studied architecture, gaining his Diploma in 1958 and ARIBA in 1960. He was Chairman of the Young Conservatives from 1964 to 1966.

He married his first wife, Claire in 1976 (she was also his secretary when he was an MP), and they had three children. In 2005, he married his second wife, Teresa at Chelsea Town Hall.

After his retirement from politics, he moved from Barnet to Oxfordshire. He was a vice-chairman of the Council of Christians and Jews and on the Council of the Royal Institute of British Architects for 2009–2012.

Chapman died on 9 October 2014 in Oxfordshire. A Service of Thanksgiving was organised by his family on 10 June 2015 at St Margaret's Church, Westminster. Attended by some 400 people including family, former colleagues, friends and constituents, the eulogies were read by Lord Ryder, Philip Porter and Chapman's sister, Cllr Christine Bateson.

== Political career ==
Chapman first stood for Parliament, unsuccessfully, at Stalybridge and Hyde at the 1964 election, but was defeated by the incumbent Labour MP Fred Blackburn.

He was first elected to Parliament in 1970 as MP for Birmingham Handsworth, but lost his seat when Labour returned to power at the February 1974 general election. During this period he was notable for Plant A Tree In '73, an initiative which had the support of Edward Heath's government and led to the formation of The Tree Council.

Five years later, at the 1979 election, Chapman was returned as MP for Chipping Barnet. The seat had previously been vacant, following the death of incumbent MP, former cabinet minister Reginald Maudling, three months before the election. He was briefly a whip during John Major's administration, one of his principal tasks being to provide Queen Elizabeth II with daily reports of Parliamentary proceedings. His conscientious attention to this role led to his being knighted in 1995. Chapman was a member of the Parliamentary Assembly of the Council of Europe from 1997 to 2005.

== Local achievements ==
In the late 1980s, following the death of a horse rider crossing the A1 trunk road in Arkley, Chapman championed the campaign to have a bridge put in for walkers', riders' and cyclists' use. This campaign was successful, and the bridge opened in 1991. In recognition of his work, he was presented with an award by the British Horse Society's President at the bridge's official opening ceremony.

== Notes ==
Parliament of the United Kingdom
Preceded by Edward Boyle	Member of Parliament for Birmingham Handsworth; 1970 – Feb 1974	Succeeded by John Lee
Preceded by Reginald Maudling	Member of Parliament for Chipping Barnet; 1979 – 2005	Succeeded by Theresa Villiers
Political offices
Preceded by John Taylor	Vice-Chamberlain of the Household; 1992–1995	Succeeded by Timothy Kirkhope
