= 1873 FA Cup final =

Association football match between Wanderers and Oxford University in 1873

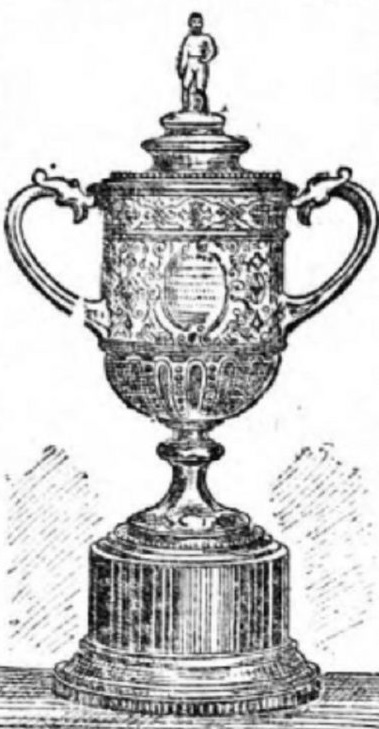
- An illustration of the FA Cup trophy awarded in 1873
- Event: 1872–73 FA Cup
Wanderers	Oxford University
2	0
- Date: 29 March 1873
- Venue: Lillie Bridge, London
- Referee: Alfred Stair (Upton Park F.C.)
- Attendance: either 3,000 or under 150

The 1873 FA Cup final was an association football match between Wanderers F.C. and Oxford University A.F.C. on 29 March 1873 at the Lillie Bridge Grounds in London. It was the second final of the world's oldest football competition, the Football Association Challenge Cup (commonly known in the modern era as the FA Cup). Unusually, the final kicked-off in the morning to avoid a clash with the annual Oxford-Cambridge Boat Race which was held on the same day. The Wanderers reached the final without playing a match, as the original rules of the competition stated that the holders would receive a bye straight to the final and other teams would compete to gain the other place in the final and challenge them for the trophy. Oxford reached the final by a walkover when their semi-final opponents, the Scottish club Queen's Park, withdrew from the competition.

Both teams had key players absent for the final, including several who had represented the Wanderers in the 1872 final. According to the press, the best player on the day was Hon. Arthur Kinnaird, who scored the first goal for the Wanderers. Charles Wollaston added a second goal towards the end of the match to give Wanderers a 2–0 victory and a second consecutive FA Cup win.

== Background ==
The Football Association Challenge Cup (commonly known in the modern era as the FA Cup) was the first formal competition created for the sport of association football, which had first been codified in England in 1863. The creation of the tournament had been proposed in 1871 by Charles W. Alcock, the secretary of the Football Association (the FA), who wrote that "it is desirable that a Challenge Cup should be established in connection with the Association, for which all clubs belonging to the Association should be invited to compete". His inspiration had been a similar competition between houses during his time as a pupil at Harrow School. The first FA Cup competition took place during the 1871–72 season and 15 clubs entered. The Wanderers, so named because they had no fixed home venue, won the final, defeating the Royal Engineers, and Alcock himself was the winning captain. Oxford University did not enter the inaugural competition; the university's football club was not formed until two days before the first FA Cup match took place.

== Route to the final ==
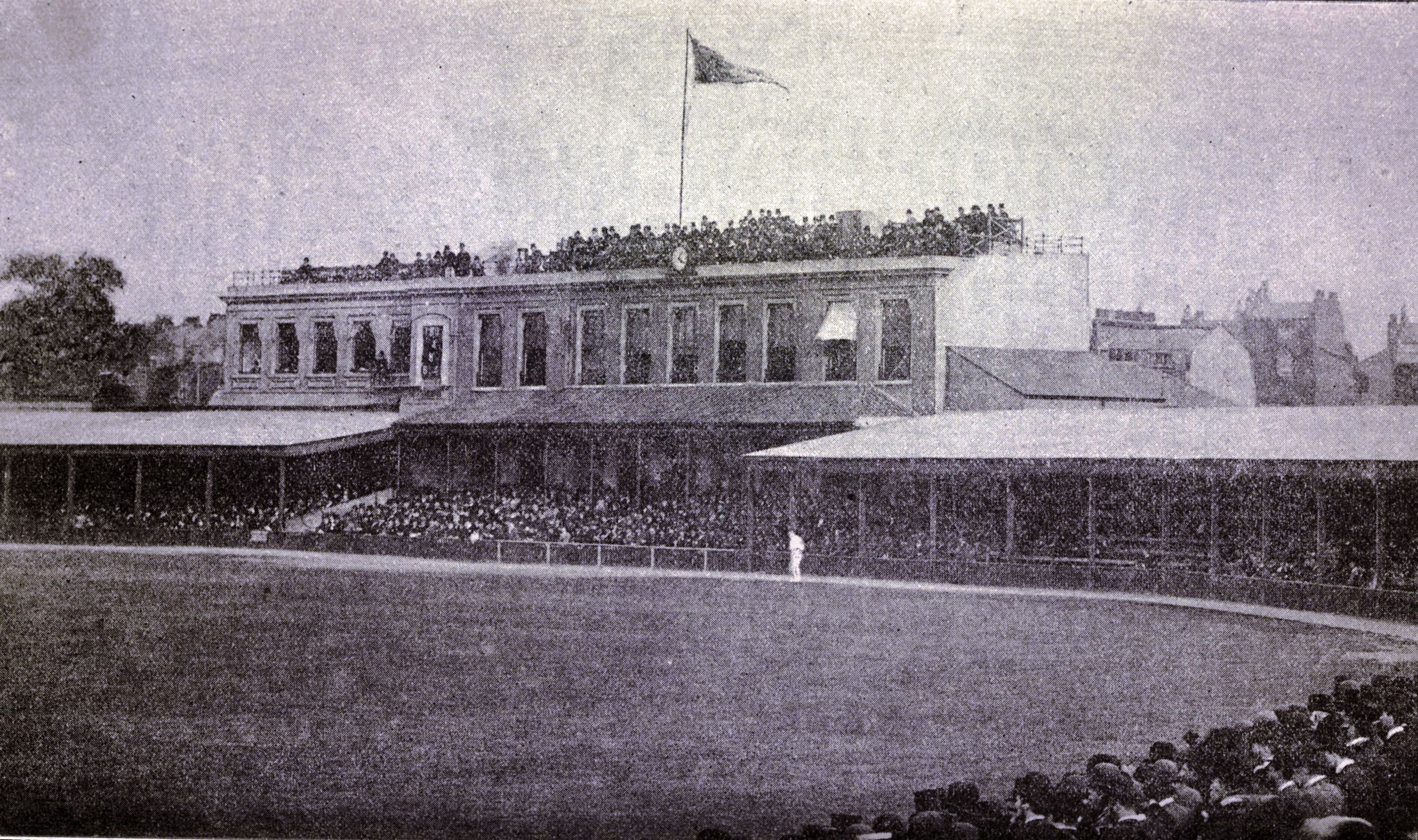
Oxford University's first FA Cup match took place at London's Kennington Oval (pictured in 1891).

The 1872–73 FA Cup was contested by 16 clubs, 14 of which entered the competition at the first round stage. As the previous year's winning finalists, Wanderers received a bye straight to the final. This was in keeping with the original concept of the competition being a "challenge cup", in which the holders would qualify directly for the following season's final and teams would compete for the other place in the final and the right to challenge them for the trophy. This was the only time this rule was used; with effect from the following season, the holders joined the competition at the first round stage along with all the other entrants.

In the first round, Oxford University played Crystal Palace^{[a]} in the first of two Cup matches played on 26 October at London's Kennington Oval. Oxford took a three-goal lead and, although their opponents scored twice, held on for a 3–2 victory. Four weeks later, they played away to Clapham Rovers in the second round and won 3–0. In the third round, the university team were paired with the previous season's losing finalists, the Royal Engineers. Oxford won 1–0 and went on to play Maidenhead in the fourth round. Due to other teams receiving byes, this was the only match at this stage of the competition, and for the third consecutive round Oxford emerged victorious without conceding a goal, winning 4–0. Oxford's opponents in the semi-finals were set to be Scotland's leading club, Queen's Park, who had received a bye straight to the semi-finals to reduce the amount and cost of travelling required to take part in a competition in which all the other entrants were from the south of England. Queen's, however, decided to withdraw from the competition due to a lack of funds, giving Oxford a walkover to the final.

== Match ==
=== Summary ===
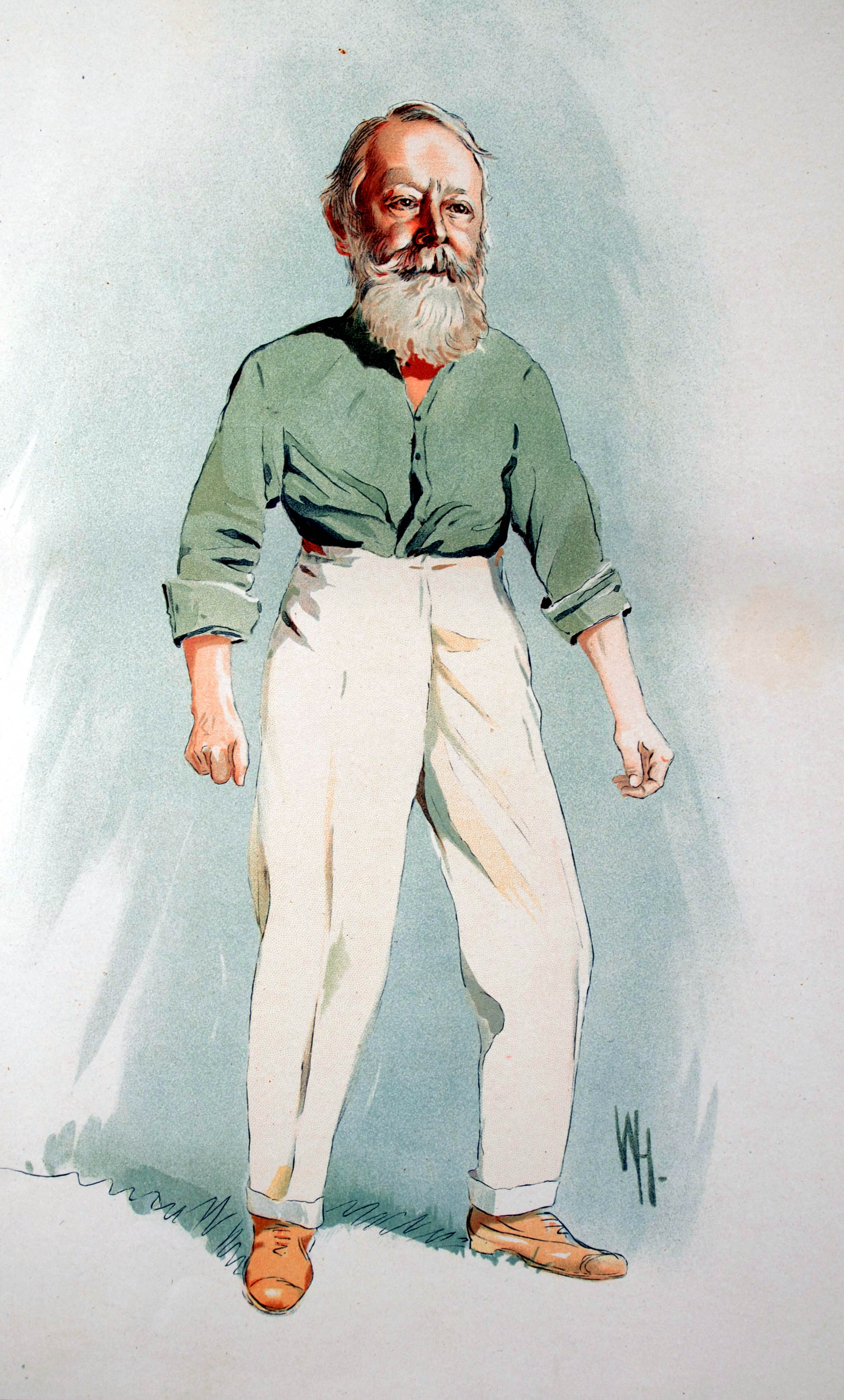
Hon. Arthur Kinnaird (1912 caricature) was the star player for Wanderers.

As Cup-holders, the Wanderers were permitted to choose the venue at which the match would be played. As the club had no fixed home venue, its officials chose the Lillie Bridge Grounds in West Brompton, London. As with the "challenge" rule, this was the only time that the previous year's winners were allowed to choose the venue for the final. The match was scheduled for the same day as the annual Oxford-Cambridge boat race and the decision was made that the Cup final would kick-off in the morning, thereby allowing the Oxford players and supporters to watch both events. The match was scheduled to start at 11:00 am but did not in fact begin until half an hour later. Modern reference works list the attendance as 3,000, an increase on the first final's reported figure of 2,000, but a contemporary report in the London Daily Chronicle contends that there were "not more than 150 persons" in attendance.

The referee was Alfred Stair of the Upton Park club, who had fulfilled the same role at the previous year's final, and the umpires were J. Clark of Maidenhead and J. Dasent of Gitanos. Hon. Arthur Kinnaird was the team captain for the Wanderers and Arnold Kirke Smith for the university team. Both teams were missing key players: Oxford's first-choice goalkeeper, Charles Nepean, was unavailable, as were three of the Wanderers' regular players, Thomas Hooman, William Crake, and Albert Thompson, all of whom had been in the Cup-winning team the year before. Walpole Vidal, who had also been in the Cup-winning team, was in the Oxford line-up for the 1873 final, having entered the university later in 1872. The Wanderers' team included William Kenyon-Slaney, a captain in the Grenadier Guards regiment, who days earlier had become the first player to score a goal for England in an international match now regarded as official.^{[b]}

Both teams played with one full-back, one half-back and eight forwards. The Wanderers lost the coin toss for the choice of ends and kicked off defending the railway end of the ground. Oxford dominated the early stages of the game due largely to the strong running of Kirke Smith and kept their opponents on the defensive. A reporter for The Sportsman commented that "the whole [Oxford] eleven work[ed] well together and with great energy" and praised the Wanderers' full-back, Leonard Howell, for his "unwearied defence". After 27 minutes, however, Kinnaird, whom the press rated as the best player of the match due to his dribbling skills, gave his team the lead when he outpaced Oxford's backs and kicked the ball between the goalposts. Oxford's goalkeeper, Andrew Leach, got his hand to the ball but could not keep it out of the goal. The teams changed ends after the goal, as was the rule at the time. Around ten minutes later, Kinnaird made another strong run but Frederick Maddison was able to dispossess him of the ball.

Shortly afterwards, Wanderers came close to scoring again when Kenyon-Slaney got the ball into the goal, only for the umpires to disallow the goal due to an infringement of the offside rule. Moments later, Kinnaird and Maddison were involved in another tussle. The university team continued to pressure their opponents and also had a goal disallowed. In an attempt to secure an equalising goal, Oxford decided, with what the reporter for The Sportsman deemed "questionable judgment", to dispense with the use of a goalkeeper and moved Leach upfield to play as a forward. The university team was reduced to ten men when Cuthbert Ottaway was injured and forced to leave the game; he could not be replaced as at the time the concept of substitutes did not exist. At around the 80-minute mark, Oxford's strategy of playing with no goalkeeper backfired when Charles Wollaston broke through and scored a second goal for the Wanderers. A correspondent for The Field stated that the shot would easily have been saved had there been a player in goal. Ottaway returned to the game, and Oxford mounted one last attack but failed to get the ball into the goal. The game ended in a 2–0 victory for the Wanderers, who thereby retained the trophy which they had won in its inaugural year.

=== Details ===
29 March 1873
11.30

Wanderers	2–0	Oxford University
Kinnaird 27'; Wollaston 80'

Lillie Bridge Grounds, London
Attendance: either 3,000 or under 150
Referee: Alfred Stair (Upton Park F.C.)

Wanderers	Oxford University

Wanderers:
GK	(England) Reginald Courtenay Welch
FB	(England) Leonard Howell
HB	(Ireland) Edward Bowen
FW	(England) Charles Wollaston
FW	(England) Robert Kingsford
FW	(England) Alexander Bonsor
FW	(England) Capt. William Kenyon-Slaney
FW	(England) Charles Thompson
FW	(United States) Julian Sturgis
FW	(England) Hon. Arthur Kinnaird (Captain)
FW	(Scotland) Rev. Henry Holmes Stewart

Oxford University:
GK	(England) Andrew Leach
FB	(England) Charles Mackarness
HB	(England) Francis Birley
FW	(England) Charles Longman
FW	(England) Arnold Kirke Smith (Captain)
FW	(England) Walpole Vidal
FW	(England) Frederick Maddison
FW	(England) Cuthbert Ottaway
FW	(England) Harold Dixon
FW	(England) Walter Paton
FW	(England) John Robert Sumner

== Post-match ==
As was the norm until 1882, the winning team did not receive the trophy at the stadium on the day of the match but later in the year at their annual club dinner. Oxford's sporting disappointment continued in the afternoon, as the university's crew was defeated by three and a quarter lengths by Cambridge in the Boat Race.

Oxford University and the Wanderers met again in the third round of the following season's FA Cup. After a drawn match, Oxford won 1–0 in a replay, the Wanderers' first defeat in the FA Cup. Oxford went on to win the trophy with a 2–0 victory over the Royal Engineers in the final, which would prove to be the only time the university team won the FA Cup. They reached the final again in 1880 but lost to Clapham Rovers; thereafter the university opted not to enter the competition again.

The Wanderers lost in the quarter-finals of both the 1873–74 and 1874–75 competitions but won the Cup in each of the subsequent three seasons. The club's fortunes declined rapidly, however, partly because many of the team's leading players opted to play instead for the clubs set up specifically for the former pupils of individual schools. The team last took part in the FA Cup in the 1879–80 season, and by the mid-1880s the Wanderers club had ceased to play matches altogether.

== Footnotes ==
a. This Crystal Palace club is not generally regarded as being the same as the modern club of the same name. In 2020, the modern club, which had long been regarded as having been formed in 1905, began asserting that it was a direct continuation of the team which existed in the 1870s based on new research by club historians, but this was disputed by other football researchers and rejected by the English football authorities.
b. Kenyon-Slaney scored in what is now regarded as the second official international football match, the first in 1872 having ended 0–0. Five earlier matches had taken place between terms representing England and Scotland, but these are not now regarded as official international matches as the Scotland team was selected only from players with Scottish connections resident in and around London.
