= Harry Meysey-Thompson =

British politician (1809–1874)

Member of Parliament for Whitby
- In office 1859–1865

High Sheriff of Yorkshire
- In office 1856–1857

Personal details
- Born: 1809
- Died: 1874 (aged 64–65)
- Spouse: Elizabeth Croft
- Children: 5, including Henry, Albert, Charles and Ernest

Sir Harry Stephen Meysey-Thompson, 1st Baronet (1809–1874) was a British Liberal politician who was Member of Parliament for Whitby between 1859 and 1865.

== Biography ==
Thompson was well known as an agriculturalist who helped found the Yorkshire Agricultural Society in 1837, becoming its president in 1862, and was one of the founders of the Royal Agricultural Society in 1838. He served as High Sheriff of Yorkshire for 1856–57 and was also M.P. for Whitby from 1859, when he was elected in a by-election to 1865. In March 1874, shortly before his death, he was created the First Baronet Meysey-Thompson, of Kirby Hall, in the West Riding of the County of York.

Thompson served the York and North Midland Railway until its amalgamation with several other railways in 1854, which created the North Eastern Railway (NER). He was then appointed to the first NER Board of Directors, which elected him to be the first Deputy Chairman; and in 1855, he was elected chairman of the board, in succession to James Pulleine. He remained chairman and director until his retirement in February 1874.

He married Elizabeth Anne Croft, and their children included: Henry (1845–1929, who succeeded to his father's title); Elizabeth Lucy, who married Walter Northcote, 2nd Earl of Iddesleigh; Albert (1848–1894); Charles (1849–1881); and Ernest (1859–1944) who became M.P. for Birmingham Handsworth from 1906 to 1922.

Business positions
Preceded by James Pulleine	Chairman of the North Eastern Railway; 1855–1874	Succeeded by George Leeman
Parliament of the United Kingdom
Preceded by Robert Stephenson	Member of Parliament for Whitby; 1859–1865	Succeeded by Charles Bagnall
Baronetage of the United Kingdom
New creation	Baronet (of Kirby Hall in the County of York); March 1874 – May 1874	Succeeded by Henry Meysey-Thompson
