= 1950 Birmingham Handsworth by-election =

UK Parliamentary by-election

The 1950 Birmingham Handsworth by-election was held on 16 November 1950. It was held due to the death of the incumbent Conservative Party MP Harold Roberts. It was won by the Conservative Edward Boyle.

Birmingham Handsworth by-election, 1950
Party	Candidate	Votes	%	±%
Conservative	Edward Boyle	22,083	60.7	+10.2
Labour	Cyril Bence	13,852	38.1	−1.1
Independent	SW Keatley	453	1.2	New
Majority		8,231	22.6	+11.3
Turnout		36,388	63.2	−19.9
Conservative hold		Swing	+5.65	
