= Challenge (competition) =

A challenge is a request made to the holder of a competitive title for a match between champion and challenger, the winner of which will acquire or retain the title. In some cases the champion has the right to refuse a challenge; in others, this results in forfeiting the title. The challenge system derives from duelling and its code of honour.

While many competitive sports use some form of tournament to determine champions, a challenge match is the normal way of deciding professional boxing titles, the World Chess Championship, and the Rackets World Championships. Some racket sports clubs have a reigning champion who may be challenged by any other club member; a ladder tournament extends the challenge concept to all players, not just the reigning champion. At elite-level competition, there is usually some governing body which authorises and regulates challenges, such as FIDE in chess. In some cases there is a challengers' tournament, the winner of which gains the right to play the challenge round against the reigning champion; in tennis this was the case at the Wimbledon Championships until 1922 and in the Davis Cup until 1972. The FA Cup's official name remains the "Football Association Challenge Cup", although not since its second season in 1873 has the reigning champion received a bye to the final. The Stanley Cup, as specified by its donor Lord Stanley in 1892, would be yielded by the holders losing either their regular-season league or a challenge from another league's champion. Such challenges occurred from 1893 until 1914, when interleague competition became standardised. The America's Cup is contested according to the terms of its 1887 deed of gift between yachts representing the defending champion yacht club and a challenging club. Since 1970, the usual practice, by mutual consent, is for an initial formal "challenger of record" replaced by the actual challenger after a qualifying tournament. However, in 1988 and 2010 there were court cases arising from non-consensual challenges. The World Snooker Championship was contested via intermittent challenge matches between 1964 and 1968, when no commercial sponsor could be found for a scheduled tournament.

When the champion dies or otherwise vacates the title, a new champion must be determined prior to the resumption of challenges. The leading contender may be proclaimed champion by default, or two top contenders may face off, or a tournament among multiple contenders may be held, such as the eight-man single-elimination tournament held in 1967–68 by Sports Action, Inc. for the WBA Heavyweight Championship stripped from Muhammad Ali.

== See also ==
- Lineal championship, where each champion has defeated the previous champion
