= Cyril Bence =

Welsh toolmaker, part-time lecturer and politician

Cyril Raymond Bence (26 November 1902 – 7 September 1992) was a Welsh toolmaker, part-time lecturer and politician.

== Earlier career ==
Bence was born near Bristol, the son of a farmer and meat purveyor. He went to school in Newport, Monmouthshire, but left school when he was 14. After working at first as an articled clerk to a solicitor, he moved into engineering with an apprenticeship at Ashworth, Son and Company, a weighing machine company. He later became a weighing machine manager. During the depression of the 1930s, he went into farming, but in 1938 he moved to Birmingham to go back into the skilled engineering trade.

== Wartime work ==
He made a name for himself during the Second World War (he was in a 'reserved occupation' not liable to call-up, but was also a pacifist), leading increased production and lecturing to other factories on how to contribute to the war effort. He also served on the Birmingham Trades Council from 1942 to 1945. He was a member of the National Union of Scalemakers, and later joined the Amalgamated Union of Engineering Workers.

== Politics ==
At the 1945 general election, Bence was the Labour Party candidate in Birmingham Handsworth. He fought the same seat in the 1950 general election and at a by-election in November 1950, but could not defeat the Conservatives.

== Parliament ==
For the 1951 general election, Bence was chosen as candidate by the Labour Party in East Dunbartonshire, a constituency in two parts which included some heavy industry on the north bank of the River Clyde. He kept the seat for Labour, and represented it until he retired at the 1970 general election.

Always on the back-benches, Bence served as a member of the Estimates Committee in the 1964-1966 Parliament, and was Parliamentary Private Secretary to Patrick Gordon Walker from 1964 and to Anthony Crosland from 1965 to 1967. He played a key role in securing government subsidy for the building of the Queen Elizabeth 2 ocean liner.

== Family ==
Bence was the father of Valerie Pearl, the historian and President of New Hall, Cambridge.

Parliament of the United Kingdom
Preceded by David Kirkwood	Member of Parliament for East Dunbartonshire; 1951–1970	Succeeded by Hugh McCartney
