= Arnold Kirke Smith =

English footballer

Arnold Kirke Smith (23 April 1850 – 8 October 1927) was an English footballer who played for England as a forward in the first international match against Scotland, as well as captaining Oxford University in the 1873 FA Cup Final. Smith was ordained as an Anglican priest in 1875 and after various clerical appointments he became vicar of Boxworth where he remained until his death on 8 October 1927.

== Career ==
Smith was born in Ecclesfield, Sheffield and was educated at Cheltenham College before going up to University College, Oxford, matriculating in 1869 and graduating B.A. in 1873. He became the captain of the university football team and was known to be a "powerful and quick attacker". He won his solitary England cap playing at inside right in England's first ever international match against Scotland on 30 November 1872, although he had previously represented Scotland in London based unofficial matches between the two nations.

In 1873, he captained the university team in the 1873 FA Cup Final against the holders, Wanderers. He started the match in goal but after conceding the first goal, he decided to play without a goalkeeper and moved into attack. Despite some "skilful" play, the students were unable to equalize before his plan "back-fired" when Charles Wollaston scored a second goal. During his career he also represented the Sheffield FA and played for the original Sheffield club.

After leaving university, Smith was ordained in 1875 and became the curate at Biggleswade for two years. He was then curate at Eaton Socon from 1877 to 1881 before moving to Somersham, Cambridgeshire, where he became vicar in 1883. After six years, he was then appointed as vicar at Boxworth where he remained until his death on 8 October 1927.

In 1998, the knitted woollen jersey that he wore in the first international match was sold at auction for £21,000.

== Honours ==
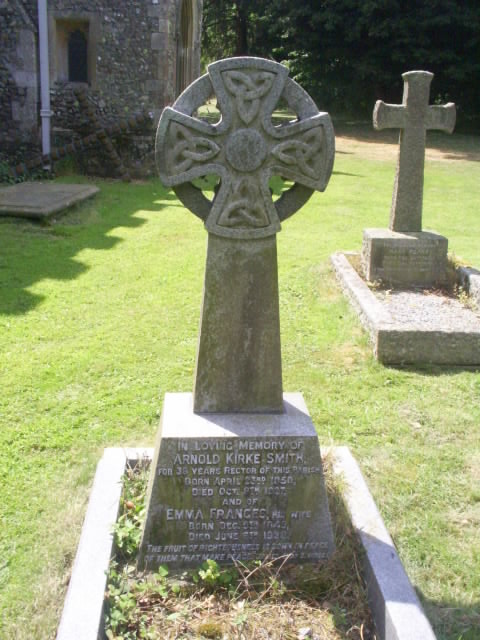
His grave at Boxworth in Cambridgeshire

Oxford University

- FA Cup runners-up: 1873
