= Chatham Lines =

Township in Allahabad, Uttar Pradesh, India

Chatham Lines is a township of Prayagraj, Uttar Pradesh, India, located near the historic Prayag railway station. It is located within the city of Prayagraj, and is famous for Kumbh Mela, a major pilgrimage and festival site in Hinduism.

== Geography ==
Chatham Lines is a locality adjacent to Prayag Railway Station in Prayagraj, Uttar Pradesh. The best known landmark in the locality is the Institute of Engineering and Rural Technology (26, Chatham Lines) and its student and staff accommodation (Ayodhya Hostel). A large part of the locality is under forest cover and is property of the Indian Armed Forces.

Nearly 36 plots of land were given to eminent individuals of India in 1935. Historians, Indian Civil Service officers, and other eminent people built bungalows on these plots.

== History ==
One of the most renowned families of Yadav's lived there, and among them, Rai Bahadur Parmanand Ji was the most famous. He was the secretary of the Uttar Pradesh Board for High School and Intermediate Education in the early 1940s.

During and prior to the 1930s, there were Married Quarters available for British Army Soldiers at Chatham Lines (probably NCO's).

The township is home to the Allahabad University Chatham Lines Campus.
