= Henry Meysey-Thompson, 1st Baron Knaresborough =

British politician (1845–1929)

The Right Honourable The Lord Knaresborough
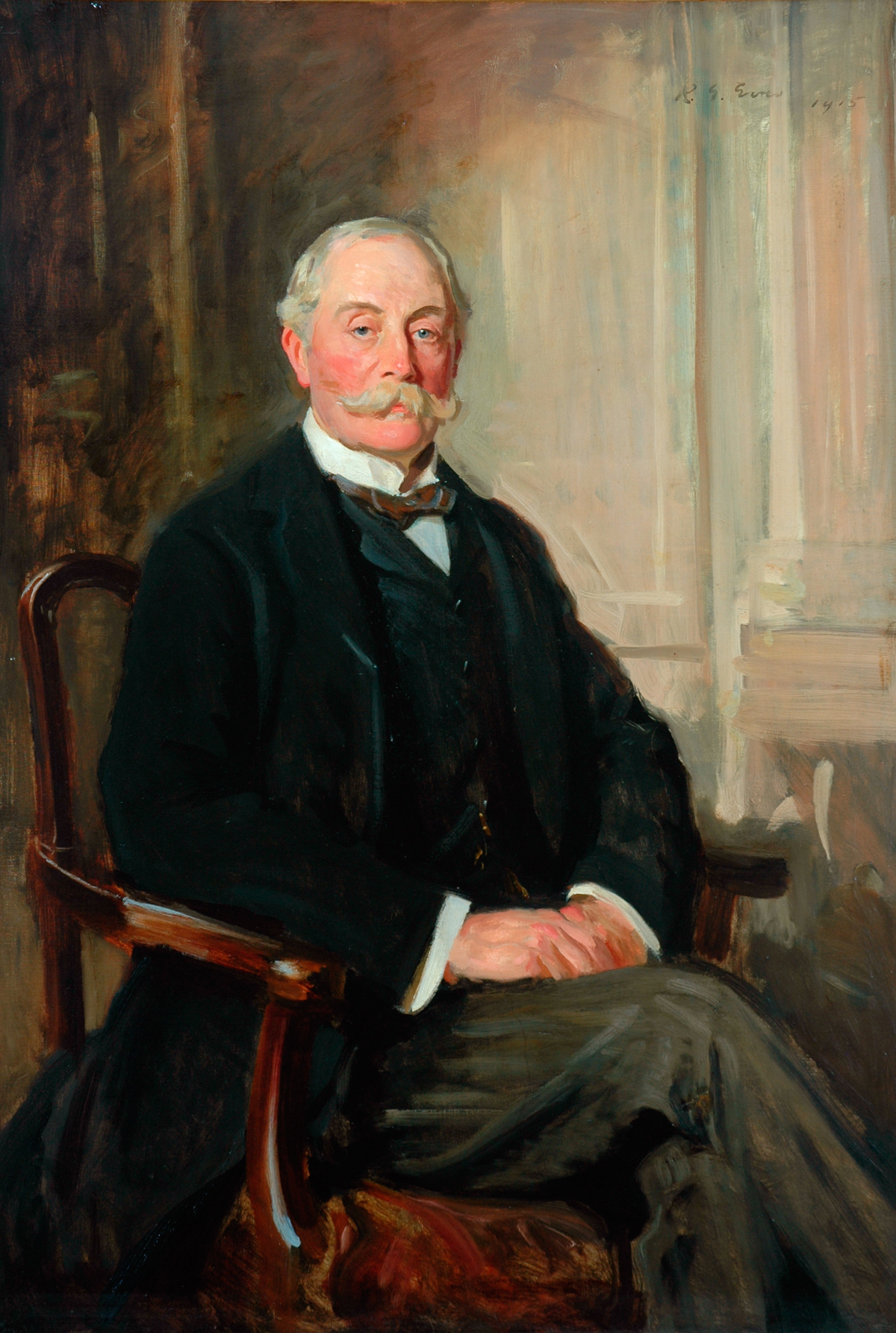
- Portrait of Meysey-Thompson, 1912

Member of Parliament for Handsworth
- In office 1892–1906
- Preceded by: Henry Samuel Wiggin
- Succeeded by: Ernest Meysey-Thompson

Member of Parliament for Brigg
- In office 1885–1886
- Preceded by: New constituency
- Succeeded by: Samuel Danks Waddy

Member of Parliament for Knaresborough
- In office 1880–1881
- Preceded by: Basil Thomas Woodd
- Succeeded by: Thomas Collins

Personal details
- Born: 15 September 1824 Kirby Hall, near Great Ouseburn, North Yorkshire, England
- Died: 15 December 1895 (aged 71) London, England
- Party: Liberal, Liberal Unionist
- Spouse: Ethel Adeline Pottinger (m. 1885)
- Parent(s): Sir Harry Meysey-Thompson, 1st Baronet; Elizabeth Anne Croft
- Education: Eton College; Trinity College, Cambridge

Henry Meysey Meysey-Thompson, 1st Baron Knaresborough (30 August 1845 – 3 March 1929) was a British Liberal (and later Liberal Unionist) politician who sat in the House of Commons variously between 1880 and 1905 when he was raised to the peerage as Baron Knaresborough.

== Early life ==
Meysey-Thompson was born at Kirby Hall, near Great Ouseburn, North Yorkshire, the son of Sir Harry Meysey-Thompson, 1st Baronet and his wife Elizabeth Anne Croft, daughter of Sir John Croft, 1st Baronet. His brothers, Albert and Charles won the FA Cup with the Wanderers in 1872 and 1873 respectively.

He was educated at Eton College and at Trinity College, Cambridge where he won his blue in athletics and was awarded BA in 1868.

== Career ==
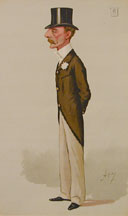
"Coaching", a caricature by Ape published in Vanity Fair in 1887.

He became a private secretary to William Ewart Gladstone. In 1874, he succeeded to the Meysey-Thompson baronetcy which had been created for his father less than two months earlier. He was a J.P. for the North and West Ridings of Yorkshire, and captain in the Yorkshire Hussars Yeoman Cavalry.

At the 1880 general election Meysey-Thompson was elected Liberal Member of Parliament (MP) for Knaresborough, but his election was declared void on 23 July 1880. In 1885 he stood for parliament unsuccessfully at North Lincolnshire. At the 1885 general election he was elected MP for Brigg. However, in 1886, as one of the MPs who opposed Gladstone's Irish Home Rule Bill, he joined the breakaway Liberal Unionist Party, but was not re-elected.

Meysey-Thompson was elected MP for Handsworth (on the outskirts of Birmingham), at the 1892 general election and held that seat until he was ennobled on 26 December 1905 as Baron Knaresborough, of Kirkby Hall in the County of York.

Lord Knaresborough was chairman of the North Eastern Railway from 1912 to 1922.

== Personal life ==
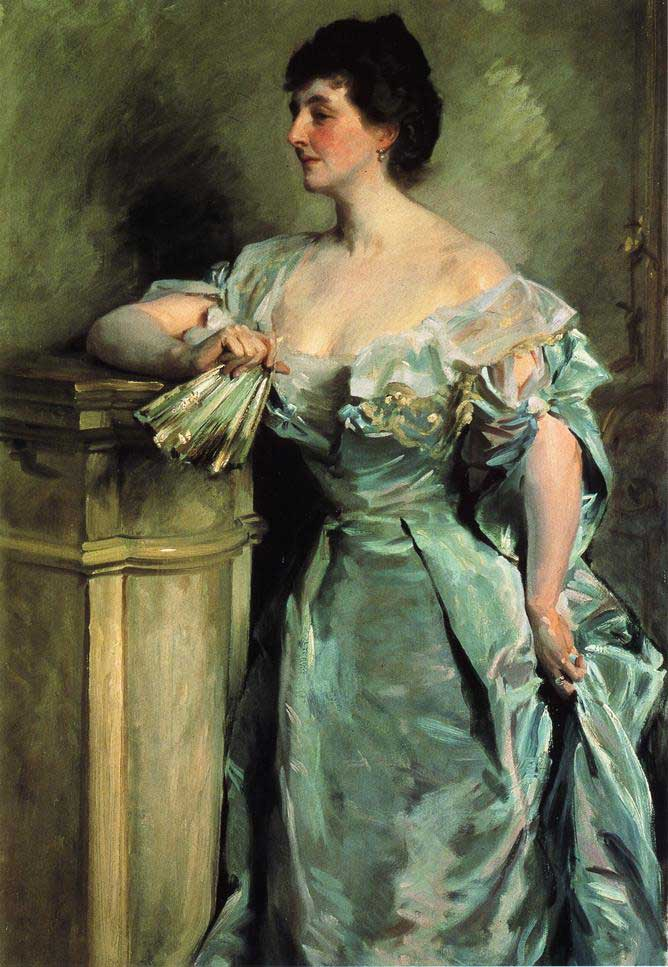
Lady Meysey-Thompson, John Singer Sargent, c. 1901

On 21 April 1885, Meysey-Thompson married Ethel Adeline Pottinger, a daughter of Sir Henry Pottinger, 3rd Baronet. Around 1901, his wife was painted by the American portraitist John Singer Sargent. Henry and Ethel were the parents of one son and four daughters, including:

- Violet Ethel Meysey-Thompson (1886–1960), who married Alexander Moore Vandeleur. After his death, she married Sir Algar Howard.
- Claude Henry Meysey-Thompson (1887–1915), who died during World War I at Ypres from wounds received in action.
- Helen Winifred Meysey-Thompson (1889–1958), who married Richard Legh, 3rd Baron Newton (1888–1960).
- Doris Mary Pottinger Meysey-Thompson (1899–1953), who married Captain Francis Egerton, grandson of Royal Navy Admiral Francis Egerton
- Gwendolen Carlis Meysey-Thompson (1903–1989), who married Lt.-Col. Sir Charles Richmond Brown, 4th Baronet (1902–1995) in 1951. They divorced in 1968.

He died in London at the age of 83. The peerage became extinct on the death of Lord Knaresborough in 1929, but the baronetcy passed to a nephew, Algar de Clifford Charles Meysey-Thompson.

== Arms ==
Coat of arms of Baron Knaresborough
Coronet Baron's coronet Crest 1st, An arm embowed quarterly Or and Azure, gauntleted Proper, grasping a broken tilting spear in bend sinister Or (Thompson); 2nd, A dragon’s head quarterly Or and Azure, eared Gules (Mersey). Escutcheon Quarterly, 1st and 4th: Per fesse Argent and Sable, a fesse counterembattled between three falcons, countercharged belled and jessed Or (Thompson); 2nd and 3rd: Argent, a fesse between three cinquefoils Sable (Mersey). Supporters On either side: A dragon Sable, wings expanded Or, and gorged with a wreath of oak Gold. Motto Je veux de bonne guerre (I wish for fair play)

Parliament of the United Kingdom
Preceded by Basil Thomas Woodd	Member of Parliament for Knaresborough; 1880–1881	Succeeded by Thomas Collins
New constituency	Member of Parliament for Brigg; 1885–1886	Succeeded by Samuel Danks Waddy
Preceded by Henry Samuel Wiggin	Member of Parliament for Handsworth; 1892–1905	Succeeded by Ernest Meysey-Thompson
Baronetage of the United Kingdom
Preceded by Harry Stephen Meysey-Thompson	Baronet (of Kirby Hall); 1874–1929	Succeeded by Algar de Clifford Charles Meysey-Thompson
Peerage of the United Kingdom
New creation	Baron Knaresborough; 1905–1929	Extinct
Business positions
Preceded by John Lloyd Wharton	Chairman of the North Eastern Railway; 1912–1922	Succeeded by William Whitelaw as Chairman, London and North Eastern Railway
