= Harold Baily Dixon =

British chemist (1852–1930)

Professor Harold Baily Dixon CBE FCS FRS
- Born: 11 August 1852; Marylebone, London, England
- Died: 18 September 1930 (aged 78); Lytham, England
- Education: Christ Church, Oxford
- Awards: Royal Medal (1913)
- Scientific career
- Fields: Chemist
- Doctoral advisor: Vernon Harcourt

Harold Baily Dixon CBE FCS FRS (11 August 1852 – 18 September 1930) was a British chemist and amateur footballer who appeared for Oxford University in the 1873 FA Cup Final.

== Early life ==
Born in Marylebone, London, England, he attended Westminster School from 1865 to 1871, and then studied at Christ Church, Oxford under Vernon Harcourt, graduating as B.A. with First Class Honours in Natural Science in 1875 and M.A. in 1878.

== Academic and scientific career ==
Dixon was Millard Lecturer at Trinity College, Oxford, from 1879 to 1886, and from 1881 to 1886 Duke of Bedford Lecturer at Balliol College, where he became fellow in 1886.

On the opening of the first women's colleges in 1879, Dixon was instrumental in allowing women to attend physics lectures. Margaret Seward was a prominent beneficiary of Dixon's proposition.

Dixon served as Professor of Chemistry, succeeding Sir Henry Roscoe, at Owen's College, Manchester from 1886 to 1922. He was chairman of governors of the Royal Technical College, Salford, Lancashire from 1916, Chairman of Salford Higher Education Committee from 1919, and of the Selective Committee for the North-West District of the Ministry of Labour from 1922. He was elected to membership of the Manchester Literary and Philosophical Society on 8 February 1887 and his obituary appears 1930 Vol75 pii.

His expertise in the chemistry behind the cause of mine explosions led him to serve on the Royal Commissions on Explosion of Coal Dust in Mines from 1891 to 1894, and on the Coal Supply from 1902 to 1905, as well as the Home Office Committee on Explosions in Mines from 1911 to 1914.

Dixon was elected a Fellow of the Royal Society in 1886, and gave its Bakerian Lecture in 1893. He was a Fellow of the Chemical Society, serving as its president from 1909 to 1911. He was awarded the Royal Society's Royal Medal in 1913: "On the ground of his eminence in physical chemistry, especially in connexion with explosions in gases."

In 1907–08 and again in 1923–25 he was President of the Manchester Literary and Philosophical Society.

During the First World War, Dixon became in 1915 Deputy Inspector of High Explosives for the Manchester area, for which service he was made a Commander of The Most Excellent Order of the British Empire (CBE) in 1918.

In 1922 he was appointed Honorary Professor of Chemistry at Manchester University and supervised research on ignition of gases for the Safety in Mines Research Board in 1927.

Dixon, who made his home in Fallowfield, Manchester, died in Lytham, Lancashire on 18 September 1930, aged seventy-eight.

== Football career ==
Usually in the position of forward, Dixon played football for Westminster School in his final year 1870–71. When he started at university he was a founder member of Oxford University's Amateur Football Club at its inception on 9 November 1871. He played with them in the second competition for the FA Cup when Oxford reached the Cup Final, played at Lillie bridge, West Brompton, on 29 March 1873, losing 2–0 Wanderers. He did later play for the Wanderers, as well as at county level for Middlesex. Unlike most of his footballing university contemporaries, he did not take part in the Varsity matches which would have earned him a 'Blue'.

== Other sports ==
Dixon was a good cricketer who was in the Westminster School XI, which he captained in his final season.

He was more noticeably active in mountaineering, undertaking exploring climbs in the Canadian Rocky Mountains, and was a member of the British Alpine Club, the Canadian Alpine Club, and the Rucksack Club of Manchester.

== Sports honours ==
Oxford University A.F.C.

- 1873 FA Cup final (runner-up).

== Sources ==
- Entry for Dixon in the Royal Society's Library and Archive catalogue's details of Fellows (accessed 27 April 2008)
- DIXON, Harold Baily, Biographical Database of the British Chemical Community, 1880–1970, from the Open University
- Physics in Oxford, 1839-1939: Laboratories, Learning, and College Life, Robert Fox and Graeme Gooday, ed.
- "Obituary Notices: Harold Baily Dixon". Proceedings of the Royal Society of London. 134 (825): i–xxvi. 1932. JSTOR 95888.

Professional and academic associations
| Preceded by Sir William Henry Bailey | President of the Manchester Literary and Philosophical Society; 1907–09 | Succeeded by Francis Jones |
| Preceded by Thomas Alfred Coward | President of the Manchester Literary and Philosophical Society; 1923–25 | Succeeded by Aloysius Laurence Cortie |
