= Frederick Soden =

English cricketer

Personal information
- Full name: Frederick Brewer Soden
- Born: 30 March 1846; Clapham Common, Surrey, England
- Died: 13 April 1877 (aged 31); Clapham Common, Surrey, England
- Batting: Right-handed
- Bowling: Right-arm roundarm medium

Domestic team information
- Years: Team
- 1870–1871: Surrey

Career statistics
Competition	First-class
Matches	3
Runs scored	37
Batting average	7.00
100s/50s	–/–
Top score	18*
Balls bowled	32
Wickets	2
Bowling average	8.50
5 wickets in innings	–
10 wickets in match	–
Best bowling	1/2
Catches/stumpings	1/–
- Source: Cricinfo, 14 April 2013

Frederick Brewer Soden (30 March 1846 – 13 April 1877) was an English cricketer. Soden was a right-handed batsman who bowled right-arm roundarm medium. He was born at Clapham Common, Surrey.

Soden made his first-class debut for Surrey in 1870 against Sussex at The Oval. He made two further first-class appearances the following season, against Sussex at the Royal Brunswick Ground, Hove, and Nottinghamshire at Trent Bridge. He scored a total of 35 runs in his three appearances, at an average of 7.00, with a high score of 7 not out. With the ball, he took 2 wickets at a bowling average of 8.50, with best figures of 1/2.

He died at the place of his birth on 13 April 1877.
