= Harold Roberts (politician) =

British solicitor and politician

Harold Roberts (23 August 1884 – 28 September 1950) was a British solicitor and Unionist (Conservative) politician. After a long career in local government in Birmingham, he represented the city in the House of Commons for the last five years of his life.

== Career ==
Roberts was the son of William Henry Roberts, and was educated privately before qualifying as a solicitor in 1906. He gained his LL.B degree in 1907, and then practised law in London and in Leicester, before moving to Birmingham in 1911.

He was first elected to Birmingham City Council in 1922, and remained a councillor for over two decades, becoming Lord Mayor of Birmingham in 1936, when he was made an alderman. He chaired the council's Public Health Committee from 1936 to 1930, and the Salaries, Wages and Labour Committee from 1941 to 1943. During his time as mayor he launched the final appeal for the city's Queen Elizabeth Hospital, which raised the £250,000 needed to allow construction to be completed.

He was also a life governor of the University of Birmingham.

=== Parliament ===
At the 1945 general election, Roberts was elected as the Member of Parliament (MP) for the Handsworth division of Birmingham. He stood as a Unionist, rather than as a Conservative; the Liberal Unionist tradition lingered in Birmingham long after the 1912 merger of the two parties, with memories of Joseph Chamberlain still strong.

Handsworth was a safe seat for the Unionists, who had held it since 1886. The sitting Unionist MP, Oliver Locker-Lampson, had not been re-selected by his local party, and planned to stand as an Independent Conservative, but was offered a post overseas and did not contest the seat. Even without Locker-Lampson, the seat was contested by five candidates. In addition to the Unionist, Liberal, and Labour parties, there was a Communist Party candidate, and another former Lord Mayor, former Unionist Noel Tiptaft, stood as a "National Independent". Tiptaft proclaimed himself as supporter of the Prime Minister Winston Churchill, prompting Churchill to send a telegram to Alderman Roberts denying that Tiptaft was a supporter of his. Labour took ten of Birmingham's 13 seats, having won none in 1935, but Handsworth was one of the three Birmingham seats retained by the Conservatives. However Roberts's majority was only 3.6% of the votes, compared with the 46% won by Locker-Lampson in a two-way contest in 1935.

Roberts was re-elected in 1950, with an increased majority of 5,472 (i.e. 11.4% of the votes).

He died at his home in Rednal, Worcestershire on 28 September 1950, aged 66. His death triggered a by-election in his Handsworth constituency, which was held in November that year. The 27-year-old baronet Sir Edward Boyle held the seat for the Conservatives, with an increased majority.

== Family ==
In January 1913, Roberts married Ann Pettifor, the daughter of George Pettifor from Anstey in Leicestershire. She survived him, with one son.

Parliament of the United Kingdom
Preceded by Oliver Locker-Lampson	Member of Parliament for Birmingham Handsworth; 1945 – 1950	Succeeded by Sir Edward Boyle
