= Meysey-Thompson baronets =

Extinct baronetcy in the Baronetage of the United Kingdom

- Arms of the Meysey-Thompson baronets of Kirby Hall
- Creation date: 1874
- Status: extinct
- Extinction date: 2002
- Motto: Je veux de bonne guerre (I wish for fair fight)
- Arms: Quarterly, 1st and 4th: Per fesse Argent and Sable, a fesse counterembattled between three falcons, countercharged belled and jessed Or (Thompson); 2nd and 3rd: Argent, a fesse between three cinquefoils Sable (Mersey).
- Crest: 1st, An arm embowed quarterly Or and Azure, gauntleted Proper, grasping a broken tilting spear in bend sinister Or (Thompson); 2nd, A dragon’s head quarterly Or and Azure, eared Gules (Mersey).

The Meysey-Thompson Baronetcy, of Kirby Hall in the County of York, was a title in the Baronetage of the United Kingdom. It was created on 26 March 1874 for Harry Meysey-Thompson, Liberal member of parliament for Whitby. He was succeeded by his son, the second Baronet. He was a Liberal, and later Liberal Unionist politician. On 26 December 1905 he was created Baron Knaresborough, of Kirby Hall (near Great Ouseburn) in the County of York, in the Peerage of the United Kingdom.

The barony became extinct on his death in 1929, his son Claude Henry Meysey Meysey-Thompson having died in 1915; while the baronetcy survived, passing to his nephew. The presumed 4th Baronet never successfully proved his succession and was never on the Official Roll of the Baronetage. When he died in 2002 the baronetcy became extinct as well.

== Meysey-Thompson baronets, of Kirby Hall (1874) ==
- Sir Harry Stephen Meysey-Thompson, 1st Baronet (1809–1874)
- Sir Henry Meysey Meysey-Thompson, 2nd Baronet (1845–1929) (created Baron Knaresborough in 1905)

== Barons Knaresborough (1905) ==
- Henry Meysey Meysey-Thompson, 1st Baron Knaresborough (1845–1929)

== Meysey-Thompson baronets, of Kirby Hall (1874; Reverted) ==
- Sir Algar de Clifford Charles Meysey-Thompson, 3rd Baronet (1885–1967)
- (Humphrey) Simon Meysey-Thompson, 4th Baronet (1935–2002)

== Arms of Baron Knaresborough ==
Coat of arms of Baron Knaresborough
Coronet Baron's coronet Supporters On either side: A dragon Sable, wings expanded Or, and gorged with a wreath of oak Gold.

== Extended family ==
Alice Hildegarde Eva Meysey-Thompson (1895–1977) left money to her cousin, the army officer Aubrey Mary Kennedy Russell-Scarr, on condition that he change his surname to Meysey-Thompson; he died in 1987. She was the daughter of Ernest Meysey-Thompson, sixth son of the 1st Baronet.
