= Andrew Leach (footballer) =

English footballer

Andrew John Leach (16 September 1851 – 7 November 1904) was an English footballer in the early days of the sport. He played for Oxford University in the 1873 FA Cup Final.

== Early life ==
Leach was born in Hampstead, London. He attended Highgate School and later St John's College, Oxford.

== Football career ==
Leach was a founder member of Oxford University A.F.C. in 1871, shortly after his arrival at the university. He played regularly for the club, and was chosen to play in the 1873 FA Cup Final against Wanderers. Although he began the game as Oxford's goalkeeper, later in the game he switched to playing as a forward, as Oxford chose to play without a goalkeeper. Oxford lost the game 2–0, with the second goal blamed on the absence of a goalkeeper.

== Later life ==
Leach went on to qualify as a barrister, being called to the bar in 1876 at Lincoln's Inn. He subsequently became a Puisne judge in Shanghai. He died in Bournemouth at the age of 53.
