= Stanhope Gardens, Kensington =

Garden Square in London

Coordinates: 51°29′39″N 0°10′51″W

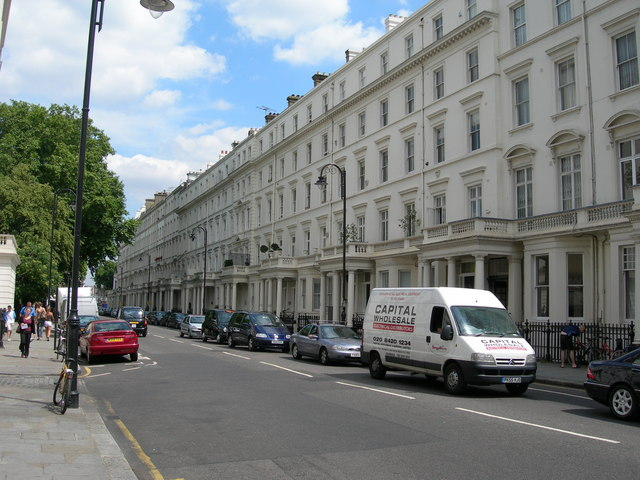
Stanhope Gardens in 2006

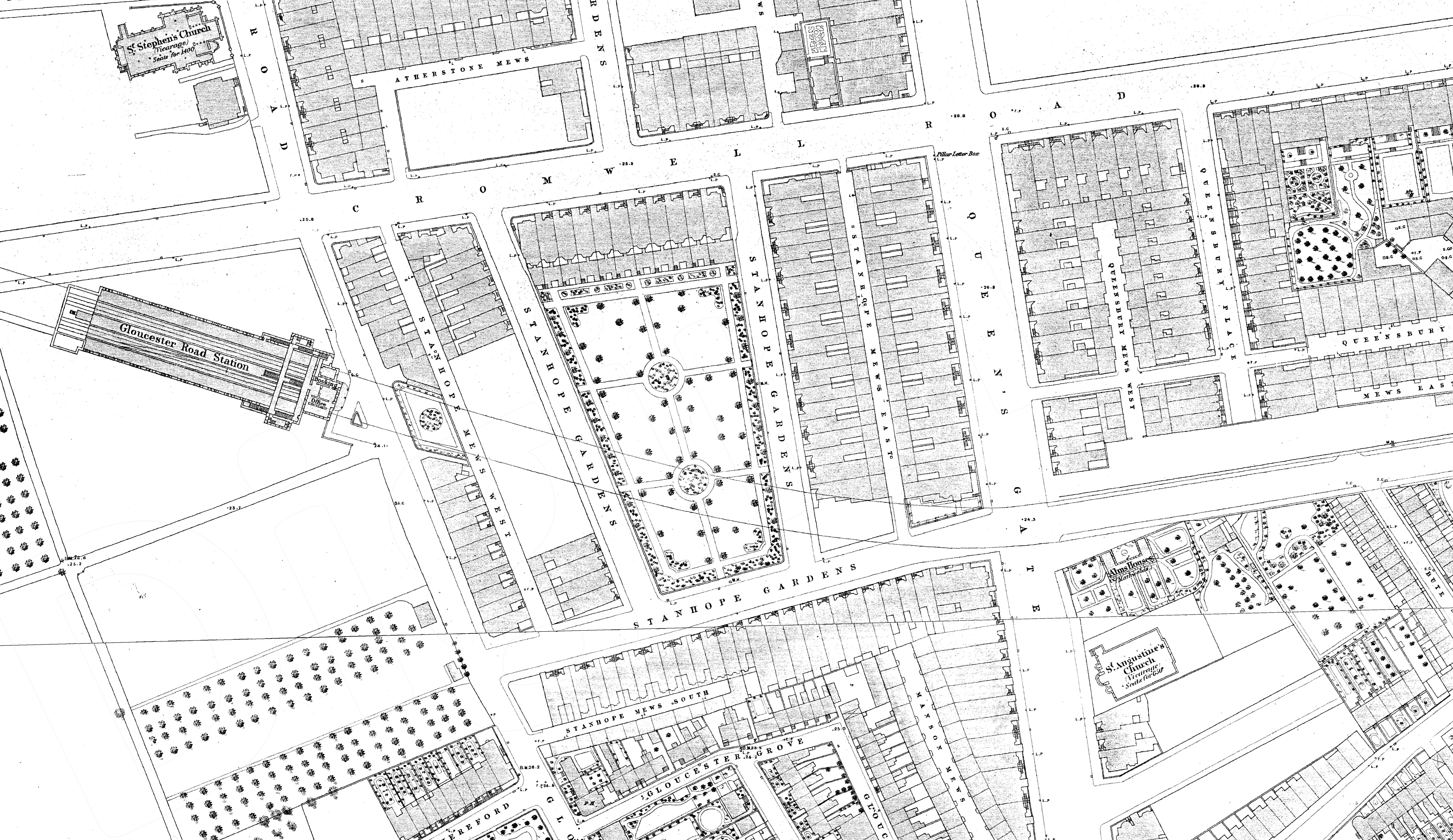
Stanhope Gardens (centre) on an 1860s Ordnance Survey map not long after it was laid out

Stanhope Gardens is a garden square and street in the Royal Borough of Kensington and Chelsea in London.

Stanhope Gardens was built from the 1860s after the area began to be developed following the Great Exhibition of 1851. The London Underground railway runs underneath the gardens.
