= Birmingham Handsworth =

UK Parliamentary constituency, 1885–1983

- Former borough constituency for the House of Commons
- County: West Midlands

1918–1983
- Seats: One
- Replaced by: Birmingham Ladywood, Birmingham Perry Barr and Birmingham Small Heath

Handsworth
- Former county constituency for the House of Commons

1885–1918
- Created from: East Staffordshire

Birmingham Handsworth was a parliamentary constituency centred on the Handsworth district of Birmingham. It returned one Member of Parliament (MP) to the House of Commons of the Parliament of the United Kingdom. It was abolished in 1983.

== Boundaries ==
1885–1918: The Sessional Divisions of Rushall Tipton, Wednesbury, and West Bromwich, and the Municipal Borough of Walsall. The constituency was created, as a county constituency, for the 1885 general election when it was the Handsworth division of Staffordshire. In 1885 the area was to the north of the parliamentary borough of Birmingham and was the south-eastern county division of Staffordshire. Birmingham, which from 1889 was a county borough, with city status, was mostly located in the geographic county of Warwickshire, but gradually expanded into adjacent areas of Staffordshire and Worcestershire.

The constituency bordered to the west West Bromwich, Wednesbury and Walsall; to the north Lichfield; to the east Tamworth and to the south Birmingham West and Birmingham North.

1918–1955: The County Borough of Birmingham wards of Handsworth, Sandwell, and Soho. By 1918 the Handsworth area had been incorporated within the growing city of Birmingham. For the 1918 general election it became a borough constituency as Birmingham Handsworth.

1955–1974: The County Borough of Birmingham wards of Handsworth, Lozells, and Sandwell. Lozells ward was formerly in Birmingham Aston. Soho ward became part of Birmingham All Saints.

1974–1983: The County Borough of Birmingham wards of Aston, Handsworth, and Sandwell.

The constituency disappeared at the 1983 general election. Sandwell ward became 32.9% of Birmingham Ladywood, Handsworth ward became 24.8% of Birmingham Perry Barr and Aston ward became 11.9% of Birmingham Small Heath.

== History ==
In 1966, 12.1% of the constituency were born in the New Commonwealth. In 1971, 27.1% of the constituency were non-White.

== Members of Parliament ==
Year	Member	Party
1885	Henry Wiggin	Liberal
1886	Henry Wiggin	Liberal Unionist
1892	Sir Henry Meysey-Thompson	Liberal Unionist
1906	Ernest Meysey-Thompson	Liberal Unionist
1912	Ernest Meysey-Thompson	Unionist
1922	Oliver Locker-Lampson	Unionist
1945	Harold Roberts	Conservative
1950 by-election	Sir Edward Boyle	Conservative
1970	Sydney Chapman	Conservative
1974	John Lee	Labour
1979	Sheila Wright	Labour
1983	constituency abolished	

== Election results ==
=== Elections in the 1880s ===
General election 1885: Handsworth
Party	Candidate	Votes	%	±%
Liberal	Henry Wiggin	7,057	63.2	
Conservative	Harry Robert Graham	4,107	36.8	
Majority		2,950	26.4	
Turnout		11,164	74.5	
Registered electors		14,988		
Liberal win (new seat)				

General election 1886: Handsworth
Party	Candidate	Votes	%	±%
Liberal Unionist	Henry Wiggin	Unopposed		
Liberal Unionist gain from Liberal				

=== Elections in the 1890s ===
General election 1892: Handsworth
Party	Candidate	Votes	%	±%
Liberal Unionist	Henry Meysey-Thompson	7,370	57.6	N/A
Liberal	Hugh Reid	5,433	42.4	New
Majority		1,937	15.2	N/A
Turnout		12,803	78.4	N/A
Registered electors		16,325		
Liberal Unionist hold		Swing	N/A	

General election 1895: Handsworth
Party	Candidate	Votes	%	±%
Liberal Unionist	Henry Meysey-Thompson	Unopposed		
Liberal Unionist hold				

=== Elections in the 1900s ===
General election 1900: Handsworth
Party	Candidate	Votes	%	±%
Liberal Unionist	Henry Meysey-Thompson	Unopposed		
Liberal Unionist hold				

General election 1906: Handsworth
Party	Candidate	Votes	%	±%
Liberal Unionist	Ernest Meysey-Thompson	13,407	60.8	N/A
Liberal	Herbert Leon	8,636	39.2	New
Majority		4,771	21.6	N/A
Turnout		22,043	84.0	N/A
Registered electors		26,243		
Liberal Unionist hold		Swing	N/A	

=== Elections in the 1910s ===
General election January 1910: Handsworth
Party	Candidate	Votes	%	±%
Liberal Unionist	Ernest Meysey-Thompson	14,594	60.6	−0.2
Liberal	George Jackson	9,488	39.4	+0.2
Majority		5,106	21.2	−0.4
Turnout		24,082	83.2	−0.8
Liberal Unionist hold		Swing	-0.2	

General election December 1910: Handsworth
Party	Candidate	Votes	%	±%
Liberal Unionist	Ernest Meysey-Thompson	Unopposed		
Liberal Unionist hold				

General Election 1914–15:

Another General Election was required to take place before the end of 1915. The political parties had been making preparations for an election to take place and by the July 1914, the following candidates had been selected;

- Unionist: Ernest Meysey-Thompson
- Labour: John Davison

General election 1918: Birmingham Handsworth
Party		Candidate	Votes	%	±%
C	Unionist	Ernest Meysey-Thompson	12,019	56.4	N/A
	Independent	Norman Tiptaft	4,697	22.1	New
	Independent Labour	Harry Joseph Odell	4,576	21.5	New
Majority			7,322	34.3	N/A
Turnout			21,292	57.2	N/A
	Unionist hold		Swing		
C indicates candidate endorsed by the coalition government.

=== Elections in the 1920s ===
General election 1922: Birmingham Handsworth
Party	Candidate	Votes	%	±%
Unionist	Oliver Locker-Lampson	18,859	59.6	+3.2
Independent	Norman Tiptaft	12,790	40.4	+18.3
Majority		6,069	19.2	−15.1
Turnout		31,649	82.9	+25.7
Registered electors		38,164		
Unionist hold		Swing	−7.6	

General election 1923: Birmingham Handsworth
Party	Candidate	Votes	%	±%
Unionist	Oliver Locker-Lampson	Unopposed		
Unionist hold				

General election 1924: Birmingham Handsworth
Party	Candidate	Votes	%	±%
Unionist	Oliver Locker-Lampson	20,056	65.6	N/A
Labour	Philip Noel-Baker	10,516	34.4	New
Majority		9,540	31.2	N/A
Turnout		30,572	78.6	N/A
Registered electors		38,872		
Unionist hold		Swing	N/A	

General election 1929: Birmingham Handsworth
Party	Candidate	Votes	%	±%
Unionist	Oliver Locker-Lampson	22,035	53.9	−11.7
Labour	Louis Anderson Fenn	11,959	29.3	−5.1
Liberal	Arthur Gordan Bagnall	6,857	16.8	New
Majority		10, 076	24.6	−6.6
Turnout		40,851	78.5	−0.1
Registered electors		52,025		
Unionist hold		Swing	−3.3	

=== Elections in the 1930s ===
General election 1931: Birmingham Handsworth
Party	Candidate	Votes	%	±%
Conservative	Oliver Locker-Lampson	30,989	78.4	+24.5
Labour	Louis Anderson Fenn	8,548	21.6	−8.7
Majority		22,441	56.8	+32,2
Turnout		39,537	75.1	−3.4
Conservative hold		Swing		

General election 1935: Birmingham Handsworth
Party	Candidate	Votes	%	±%
Conservative	Oliver Locker-Lampson	24,135	73.0	−5.4
Labour	A G Chattaway	8,910	27.0	+5.4
Majority		15,225	46.0	−10.8
Turnout		33,045	61.7	−13.4
Conservative hold		Swing		

=== Elections in the 1940s ===
General Election 1939–40

Another General Election was required to take place before the end of 1940. The political parties had been making preparations for an election to take place and by the Autumn of 1939, the following candidates had been selected;

- Conservative: Oliver Locker-Lampson
- Labour: A G Chattaway

General election 1945: Birmingham Handsworth
Party	Candidate	Votes	%	±%
Conservative	Harold Roberts	15,607	37.9	−35.1
Labour	Cyril Bence	14,142	34.3	+7.3
National Independent	Norman Tiptaft	5,112	12.4	New
Liberal	Barbara Lewis	4,945	12.0	New
Communist	Jessie Eden	1,390	3.4	New
Majority		1,465	3.6	−42.4
Turnout		40,180	72.5	+10.8
Conservative hold		Swing	+21.2	

=== Elections in the 1950s ===
General election 1950: Birmingham Handsworth
Party	Candidate	Votes	%	±%
Conservative	Harold Roberts	24,246	50.5	+12.6
Labour	Cyril Bence	18,774	39.2	+4.9
Liberal	Ronald William Eades	4,926	10.3	−1.7
Majority		5,472	11.3	+7.7
Turnout		47,972	83.1	+10.6
Conservative hold		Swing	+4.3	

1950 Birmingham Handsworth by-election
Party	Candidate	Votes	%	±%
Conservative	Edward Boyle	22,083	60.7	+10.2
Labour	Cyril Bence	13,852	38.1	−1.1
Independent	SW Keatley	453	1.2	New
Majority		8,231	22.6	+11.3
Turnout		36,388	63.2	−19.9
Conservative hold		Swing	+5.65	

General election 1951: Birmingham Handsworth
Party	Candidate	Votes	%	±%
Conservative	Edward Boyle	27,201	59.5	+9.0
Labour	Richard William Evely	18,494	40.5	+1.3
Majority		8,707	19.0	+7.7
Turnout		45,695	79.0	+15.9
Conservative hold		Swing	+1.9	

General election 1955: Birmingham Handsworth
Party	Candidate	Votes	%	±%
Conservative	Edward Boyle	24,349	60.0	+0.5
Labour	Alexander Murie	14,064	34.7	−5.8
Independent	SW Keatley	2,148	5.3	New
Majority		10,285	25.3	+6.3
Turnout		38,415	69.6	−9.4
Conservative hold		Swing	+3.15	

- Independent Peace candidate

General election 1959: Birmingham Handsworth
Party	Candidate	Votes	%	±%
Conservative	Edward Boyle	23,243	60.8	+0.8
Labour	Alexander Murie	13,116	34.3	−0.4
Independent	SW Keatley	1,867	4.9	−0.4
Majority		10,127	26.5	+1.2
Turnout		38,226	68.8	−0.8
Conservative hold		Swing	+0.6	

=== Elections in the 1960s ===
General election 1964: Birmingham Handsworth
Party	Candidate	Votes	%	±%
Conservative	Edward Boyle	16,841	47.5	−13.3
Labour	Sheila Wright	11,909	33.6	−0.7
Liberal	Wallace Lawler	6,249	17.6	New
Independent	SW Keatley	459	1.3	−3.6
Majority		4,932	13.9	−12.6
Turnout		35,459	66.6	−2.2
Conservative hold		Swing	-6.3	

General election 1966: Birmingham Handsworth
Party	Candidate	Votes	%	±%
Conservative	Edward Boyle	16,225	49.9	+2.4
Labour	Sheila Wright	14,931	46.0	+12.4
Union Movement	Jeffrey Hamm	1,337	4.1	New
Majority		1,294	3.9	−10.0
Turnout		32,493	63.2	−3.4
Conservative hold		Swing		

=== Elections in the 1970s ===
General election 1970: Birmingham Handsworth
Party	Candidate	Votes	%	±%
Conservative	Sydney Chapman	16,122	53.0	+3.1
Labour	Sheila Wright	14,310	47.0	+1.0
Majority		1,812	6.0	+2.1
Turnout		30,432	65.2	+2.0
Conservative hold		Swing	+2.05	

General election February 1974: Birmingham Handsworth
Party	Candidate	Votes	%	±%
Labour	John Lee	14,290	43.5	−3.5
Conservative	Sydney Chapman	12,667	38.6	−14.4
Liberal	P Tilsley	5,566	16.9	New
Marxist-Leninist (England)	S. Thompson	334	1.0	New
Majority		1,623	4.9	−1.1
Turnout		32,857	72.4	+7.2
Labour gain from Conservative		Swing	+5.45	

General election October 1974: Birmingham Handsworth
Party	Candidate	Votes	%	±%
Labour	John Lee	15,011	49.4	+5.9
Conservative	R Tyler	11,115	37.0	−1.6
Liberal	DI Grant-Smith	3,205	10.6	−7.3
National Front	J Finnegan	838	2.8	New
More Prosperous Britain	Tom Keen	105	0.3	New
Marxist-Leninist (England)	J. L. Hutchinson	103	0.3	New
Majority		3,896	12.4	+7.5
Turnout		29,339	66.5	−5.9
Labour hold		Swing	+3.75	

General election 1979: Birmingham Handsworth
Party	Candidate	Votes	%	±%
Labour	Sheila Wright	16,998	55.2	+5.8
Conservative	R Tyler	13,789	44.8	+7.8
Majority		3,209	10.4	−2.0
Turnout		30,787	68.4	+2.9
Labour hold		Swing	-1.0	

== See also ==
- List of former United Kingdom Parliament constituencies
