= Ernest Meysey-Thompson =

British politician (1859–1944)

House of Commons
- In office 1906–1922

Member of Parliament Representative for Handsworth
- In office 1906–1922

Personal details
- Born: 18 February 1859
- Died: 28 February 1944 (aged 85)
- Party: Conservative (after 1912); Liberal Unionist (until 1912)
- Parent: Henry Meysey-Thompson, 1st Baronet (father)
- Relatives: Sir John Croft, 1st Baronet (grandfather)
- Education: Trinity College, Cambridge
- Military career
- Allegiance: United Kingdom
- Branch: Army
- Rank: Lieutenant-colonel
- Unit: Yorkshire Hussars
- Conflicts: World War I

Ernest Claude Meysey-Thompson (18 February 1859 – 28 February 1944) was a British Army officer and Liberal Unionist Party (later Conservative Party) politician. He sat in the House of Commons from 1906 to 1922 as the Member of Parliament (MP) for Handsworth.

== Early life ==
Meysey-Thompson was the sixth son of Sir Henry Meysey-Thompson (later 1st Baronet) and his wife Elizabeth, the daughter of Sir John Croft, Bt. He was educated at Eton College and at Trinity College, Cambridge.

In 1894, he married Alice Joicey, the daughter of John Joicey, a coalmine-owner and former MP from County Durham.

== Political career ==
At the 1900 general election, he contested the Buckrose division of the East Riding, where he lost by 91 votes (1.2%) to the Liberal candidate Luke White.

However, his father retired from the Commons at the Dissolution of Parliament in January 1906, was raised to the peerage as Baron Knaresborough. As a member of the House of Lords he was disqualified from the House of Commons. At the general election later that month, Ernest stood for his father's old constituency of Handsworth in Staffordshire. He held the seat with a majority of 4,771 votes (21.6%) over his Liberal Party opponent Herbert Leon, a former MP for Buckingham. He was re-elected at both the January and December elections in 1910.

The Liberal Unionists had merged with the Conservative Party in 1912, and at the 1918 general election Meysey-Thompson was re-elected as a Coalition Conservative. He stood down from Parliament at the 1922 general election.

== Military career ==
Meysey-Thompson was an officer in the part-time Yeomanry, being commissioned into the Yorkshire Hussars on 22 August 1894, promoted to captain on 21 May 1902, and retiring with the rank of major on 30 September 1909.

On the outbreak of World War I he was made a temporary major on 12 August 1914 and threw himself into raising units of artillery volunteers for Kitchener's Army. These included the 161st (Yorkshire), Brigade, Royal Field Artillery (RFA) (authorised 10 March 1915) followed by the 164th (Rotherham) (9 April), 168th (Huddersfield) (20 April), 175th (Staffordshire) and 176th (Leicestershire) (both 12 May) RFA brigades. As 'Local Units',ie those raised outside the Army mechanism, these are comparable to the famous 'Pals battalions' of locally raised infantry.

On 24 June 1915 Meysey-Thompson was gazetted as a lieutenant-colonel to command 175th (Staffordshire) Brigade, RFA, in 34th Division. He was attached to an RFA brigade on the Western Front at Armentières to gain experience, and then returned to England to complete the training of 175th Brigade. He was still raising new units, now for the Royal Garrison Artillery (RGA), who manned the heavier guns. These included the 144th (York), 147th (Leicester), 148th (Smethwick), 149th (Wakefield), 150th (Rotherham) and 157th (Leicester) Heavy Batteries, RGA. By the time the 157th (Leicester) Battery was authorised (25 October), Mr C.A. Bury of Heworth Green, York, was listed as raising the unit on Meysey-Thompson's behalf because he was on service, having been appointed on 1 October 1915 to command the Divisional Ammunition Column, RFA, for 5th Division on the Western Front.

Parliament of the United Kingdom
Preceded by Sir Henry Meysey-Thompson, Bt	Member of Parliament for Handsworth; 1906–1922	Succeeded by Oliver Locker-Lampson
