= List of alumni of Trinity College, Cambridge =

This is a list of notable alumni of Trinity College, Cambridge, including alumni from Trinity College at the University of Cambridge. Some of the alumni noted are connected to Trinity through honorary degrees; not all studied at the college.

== Politicians ==
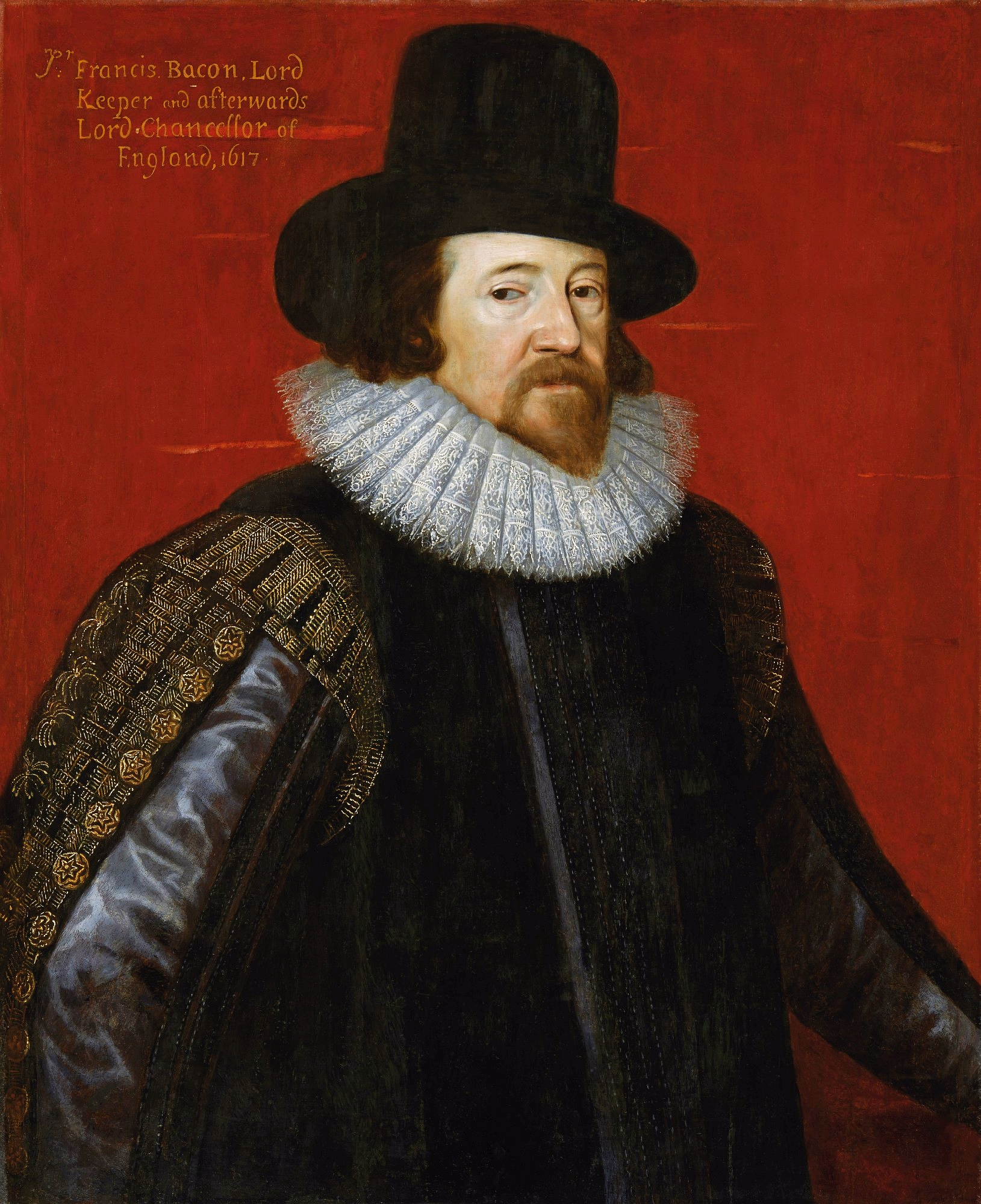
Sir Francis Bacon lawyer, philosopher; Lord Chancellor

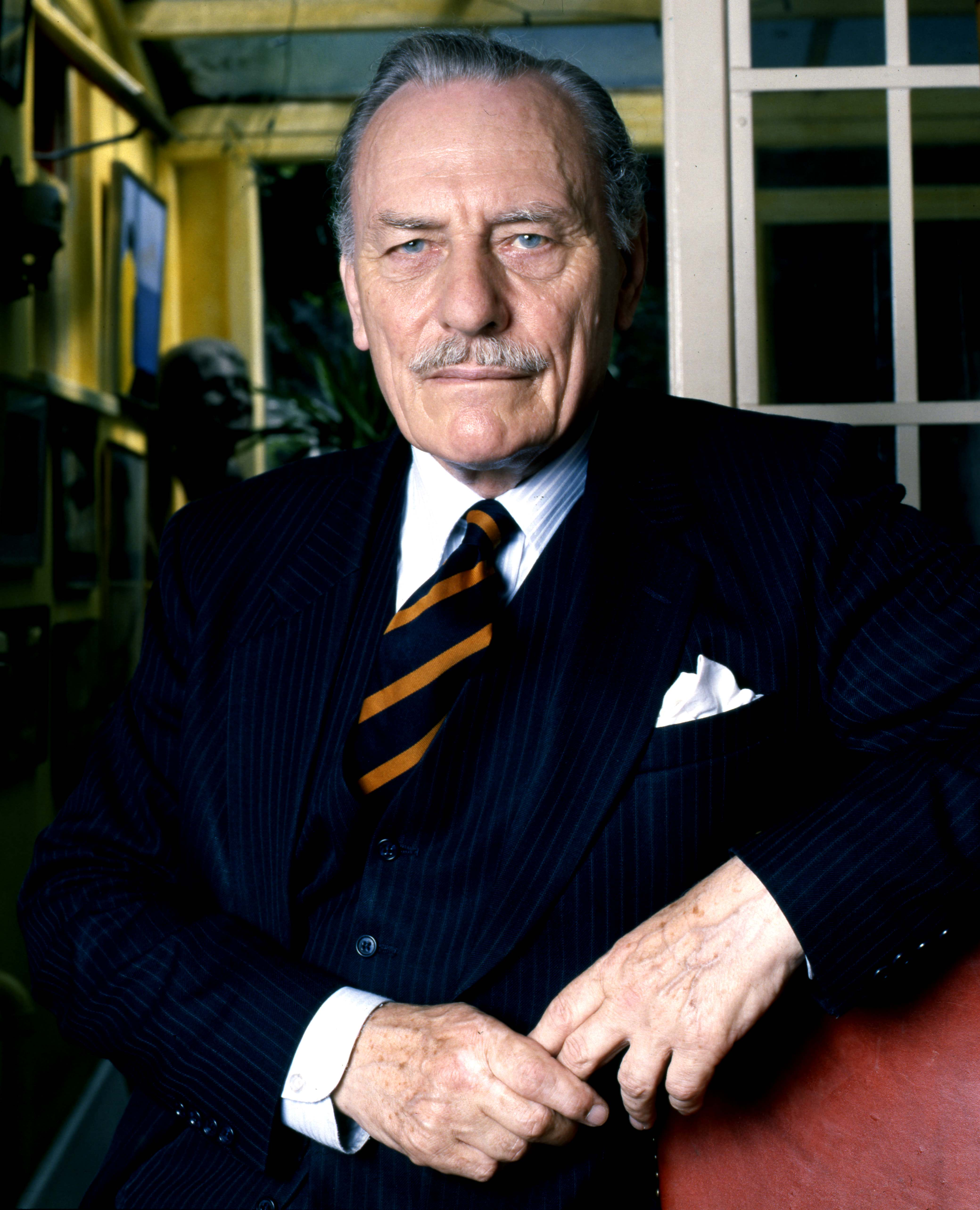
Enoch Powell, Conservative British politician

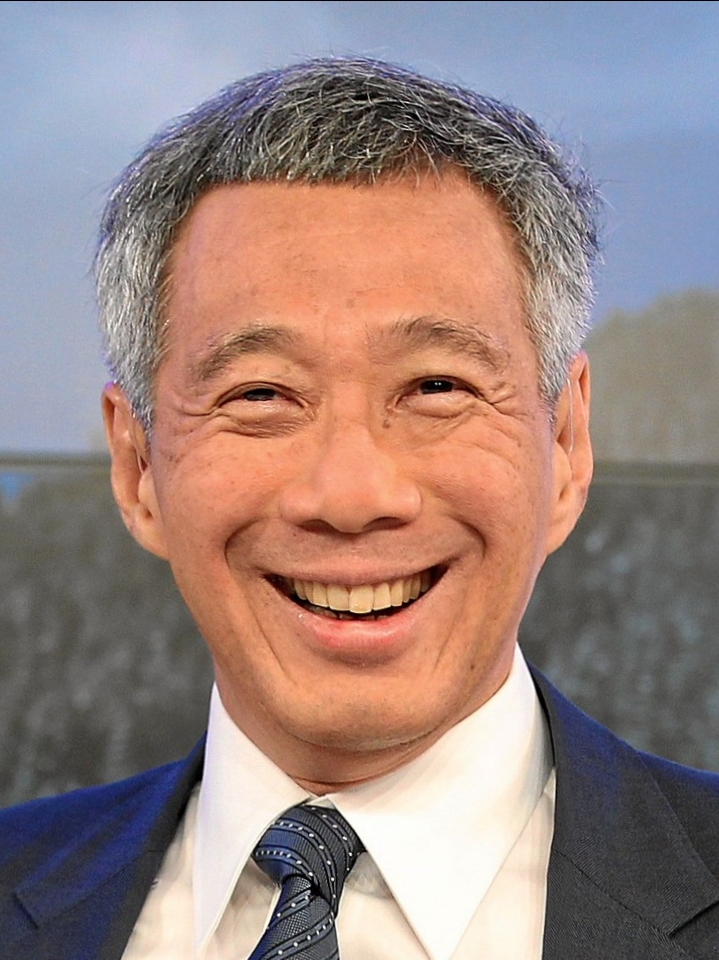
Lee Hsien-Loong, Third Prime Minister of Singapore

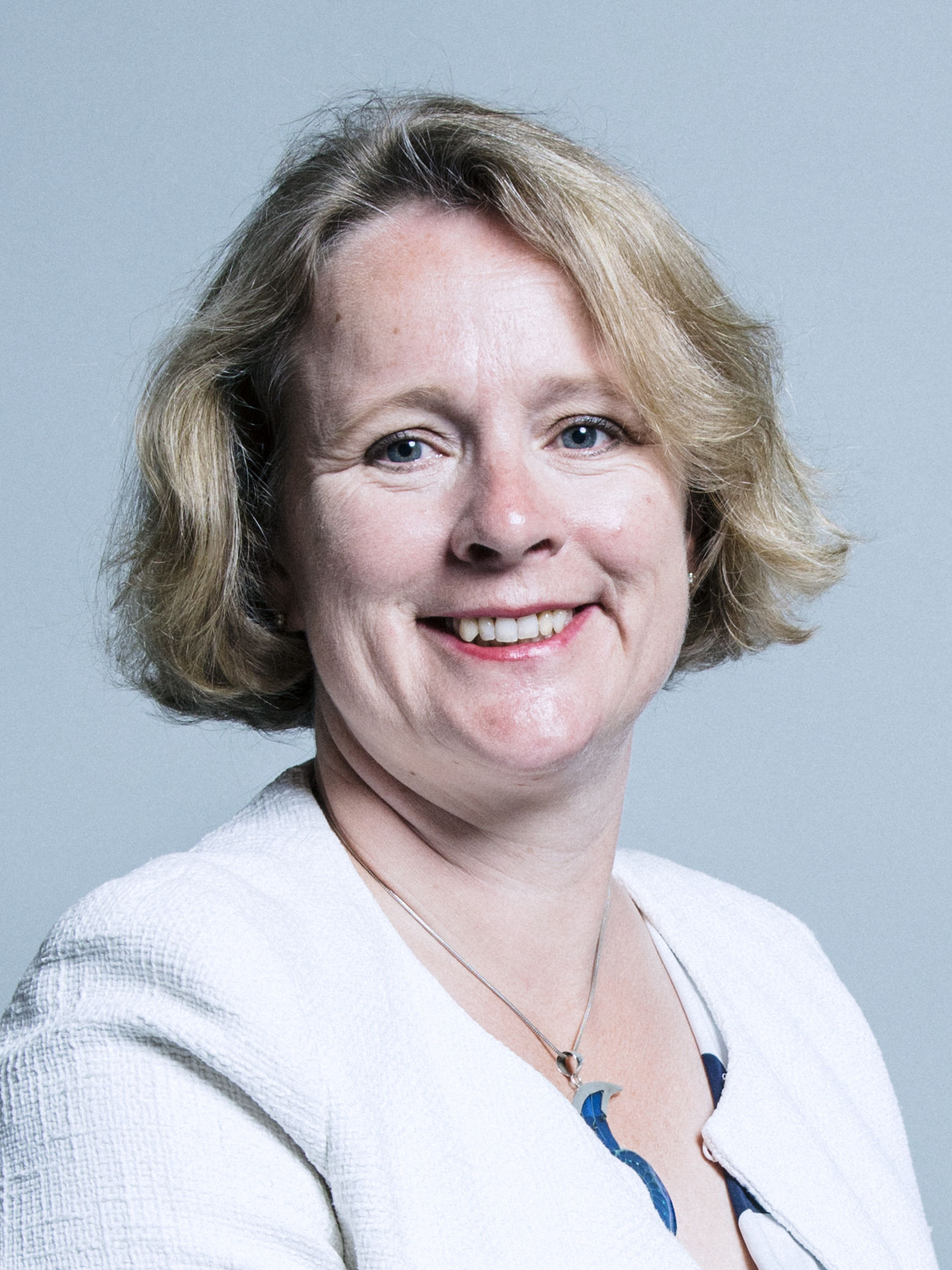
Vicky Ford, ex-serving Conservative British politician

=== Prime Ministers ===
- Stanley Baldwin, 1st Earl Baldwin of Bewdley (1867–1947), Prime Minister 1923–24, 1924–29, 1935–37 (Conservative)
- Arthur Balfour, 1st Earl of Balfour (1848–1930), Prime Minister 1902–1905 (Conservative)
- Sir Henry Campbell-Bannerman (1836–1908), Prime Minister 1905–1908 (Liberal)
- Rajiv Gandhi (1944–1991), Prime Minister of India, 1984–1989
- Charles Grey, 2nd Earl Grey (1764–1845), Prime Minister 1830–1834 (Whig); Great Reform Act (1832)
- William Lamb, 2nd Viscount Melbourne (1779–1848), Prime Minister 1834, 1835–1841 (Whig)
- Lee Hsien Loong (born 1952), Prime Minister of Singapore, 2004–2024
- Jawaharlal Nehru (1889–1964), first Prime Minister of India, 1949–1964
- Anand Panyarachun (born 1932), Prime Minister of Thailand, 1991–1992 and again in 1992
- Spencer Perceval (1762–1812), Prime Minister 1809–1812 (Tory); assassinated
- William Waddington (1826–1894), French Prime Minister 1879; archaeologist

=== United Kingdom ===
- Archbishop Adam Loftus (1533-1605), lawyer and Lord Chancellor of Ireland
- Sir Francis Bacon (1561–1626), lawyer, philosopher, and Lord Chancellor
- Gavin Barwell (born 1972), Downing Street Chief of Staff under Theresa May
- Spencer Cavendish, 8th Duke of Devonshire (also known as Marquess of Hartington) (1833–1908), politician
- Hugh Childers (1827–1896), Australian statesman, then British Chancellor of the Exchequer
- Sir Edward Coke (1552–1634), lawyer, politician; Chief Justice of the King's Bench
- Sir John Coke (1563–1644), politician
- John Donaldson, Baron Donaldson of Lymington (1920–2005), Master of the Rolls
- Hugh Elliott, UK Ambassador to Spain and Andorra
- Frederick James Erroll, 1st Baron Erroll of Hale (1914–2000), British Minister
- Thomas Erskine, 1st Baron Erskine (1750–1823), Lord Chancellor, jurist
- Vicky Ford, former Conservative MP for Chelmsford
- Sir Michael Foster (1836–1907), physiologist; MP (London University)
- Henry Goulburn (1784–1856), Chancellor of the Exchequer
- Roland Gwynne (1882–1971), politician and lover of suspected serial killer John Bodkin Adams
- Sir William Vernon Harcourt (1827–1904), Liberal statesman; home secretary, Chancellor of the Exchequer
- Douglas Hurd (born 1930), Conservative politician, Home Secretary, Foreign Secretary
- George Jellicoe, 2nd Earl Jellicoe (1918–2007), statesman
- Kwasi Kwarteng (born 1975), Conservative politician, Chancellor of the Exchequer, Secretary of State for Business, Energy and Industrial Strategy
- James Mackay, Baron Mackay of Clashfern (born 1927), Lord Chancellor 1987–1997
- John Manners, 7th Duke of Rutland (also known as Lord John Manners) (1818–1906), Conservative statesman
- Sir Philip Miles (1825–1888), politician
- Richard Monckton Milnes, 1st Baron Houghton (1809–1885), politician, man of letters
- Charles Montagu, 1st Duke of Manchester (1656–1722), Whig statesman
- Charles Montagu, 1st Earl of Halifax (1661–1715), founder of Bank of England, 1694; Chancellor of Exchequer
- John Montagu, 4th Earl of Sandwich (1718–1792), First Lord of the Admiralty; is claimed to have invented the sandwich
- George Montague-Dunk, 2nd Earl of Halifax (1716–1771), Secretary of State
- Helen Morgan, Liberal Democrat MP for North Shropshire
- Ernest Noel (1831–1931), MP for Dumfries Burghs, 1874–1886
- Anthony Nutting (1920–1999), politician and diplomat; Arabist
- Charles Pepys, 1st Earl of Cottenham (1781–1851), lawyer, Lord Chancellor, 1846–1850
- Henry Petty-Fitzmaurice, 3rd Marquess of Lansdowne (1780–1863), Whig statesman
- Constantine Henry Phipps, 1st Marquess of Normanby (1797–1863), politician
- Enoch Powell (1912–1998), statesman; Minister of Health, 1960–3; politician
- Francis Russell, 5th Duke of Bedford (1765–1802), Whig aristocrat
- Charles Seymour, 6th Duke of Somerset (1662–1748), politician and Whig Grandee
- John Charles Spencer, 3rd Earl Spencer (1782–1845), known as Lord Althorp; Chancellor of the Exchequer
- Edward Stanley, 15th Earl of Derby (1826–1893), Foreign Secretary
- William Whitelaw (1918–1999), statesman; Home Secretary, 1979–83

=== International ===
- Richard Blumenthal (born 1946), Senior U.S. Senator from Connecticut
- Puran Singh Bundela (born 1950), Indian politician
- Erskine Hamilton Childers (1905–1974), 4th President of Ireland, 1973–74
- Freeman Freeman-Thomas, 1st Marquess of Willingdon (1866–1941), administrator; Viceroy of India
- Rahul Gandhi (born 1970), Member of Parliament (Lok Sabha) for Wayanad and Former President of the Indian National Congress
- Albert Grey, 4th Earl Grey (1851–1917), Governor General of Canada, 1904–1911
- Charles Hawker (1894–1938), Australian politician
- Thomas Nelson (1738–1789), signatory of the United States Declaration of Independence
- James Peter Obeyesekere (1915–2007), aviator and Sri Lankan minister
- Allegra Spender (born 1978), Australian businesswoman and Member of Parliament for Wentworth
- John Winthrop (1587/8–1649), founder and first governor of Massachusetts

== Royalty ==
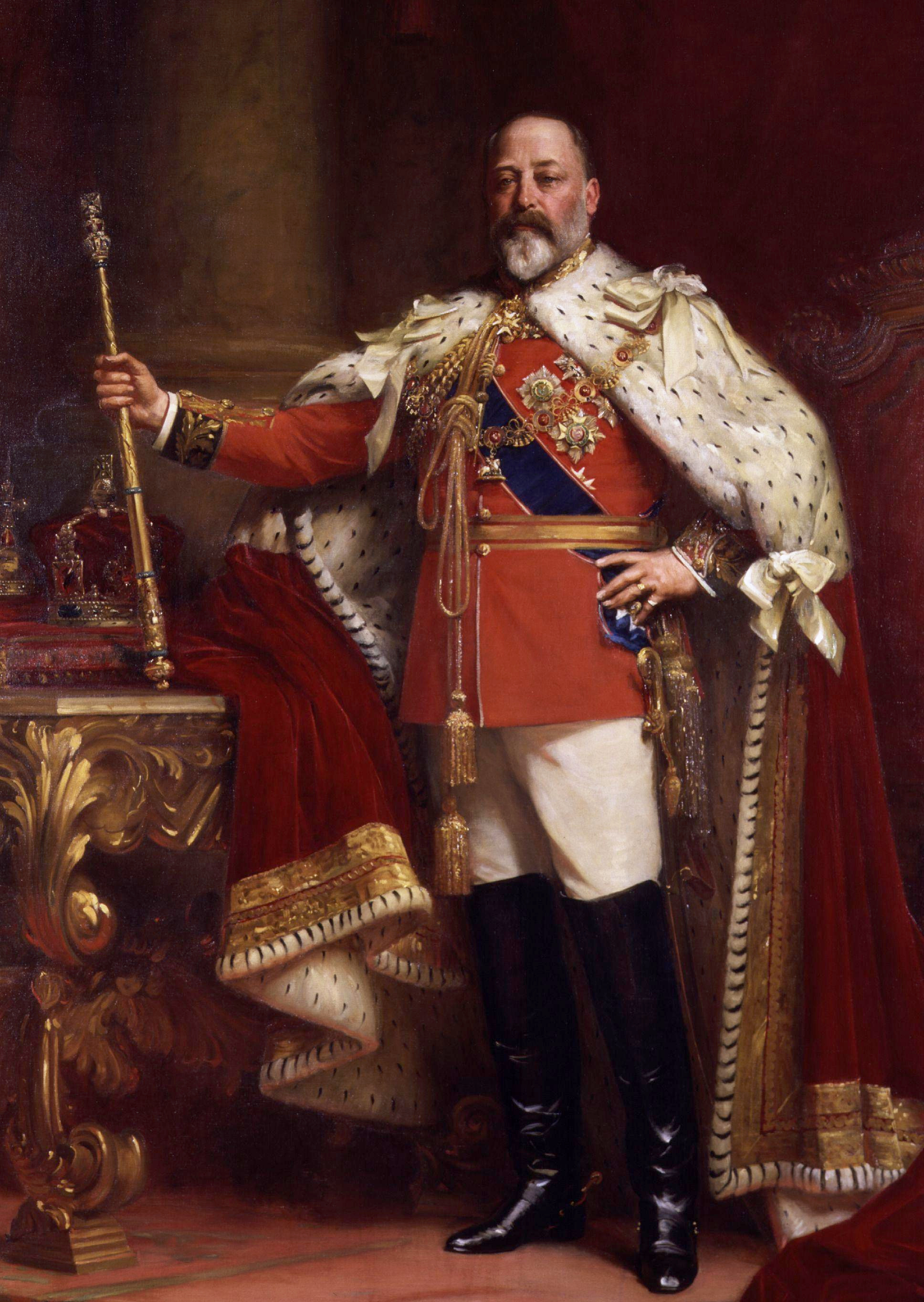
King Edward VII

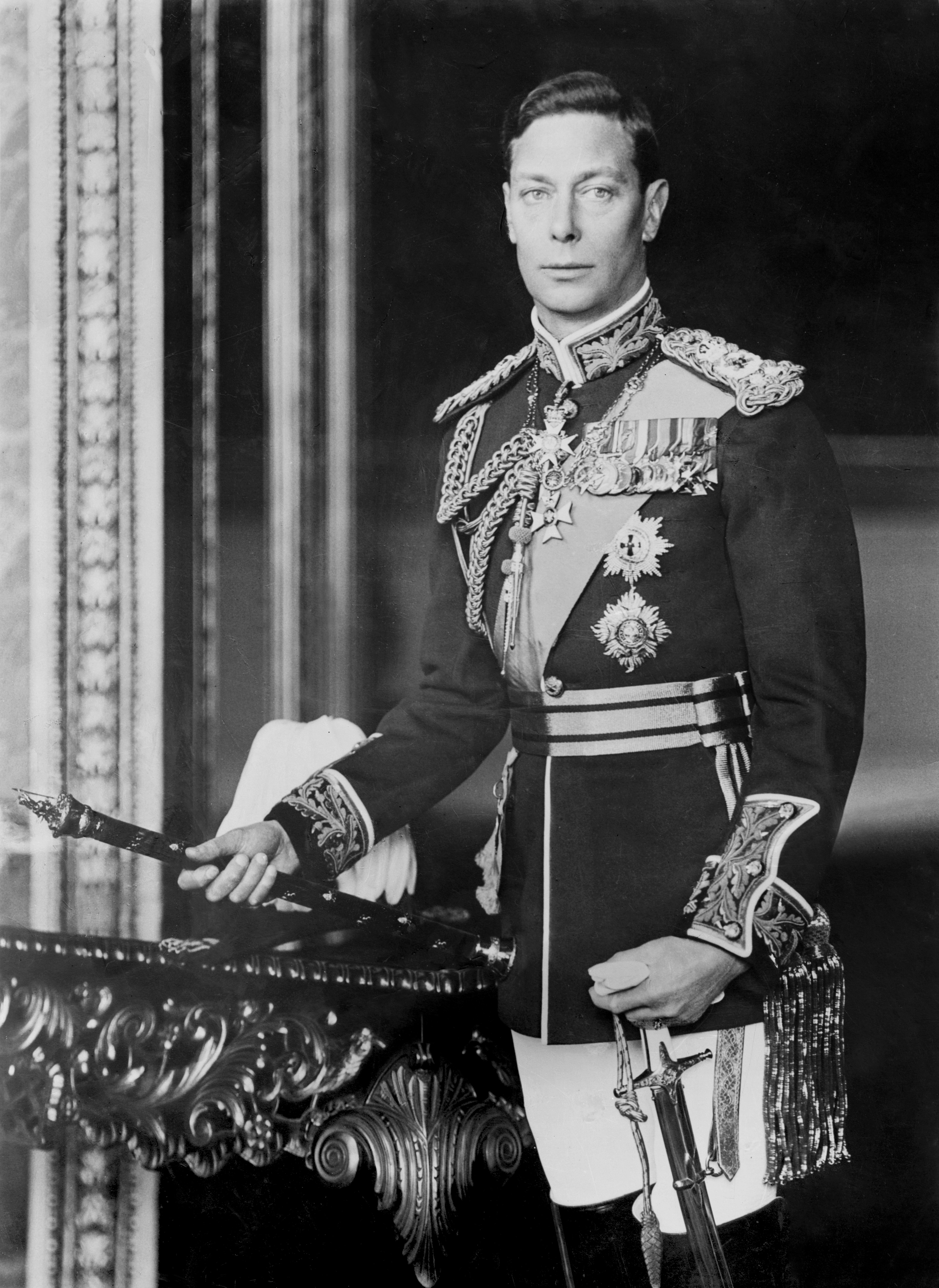
King George VI

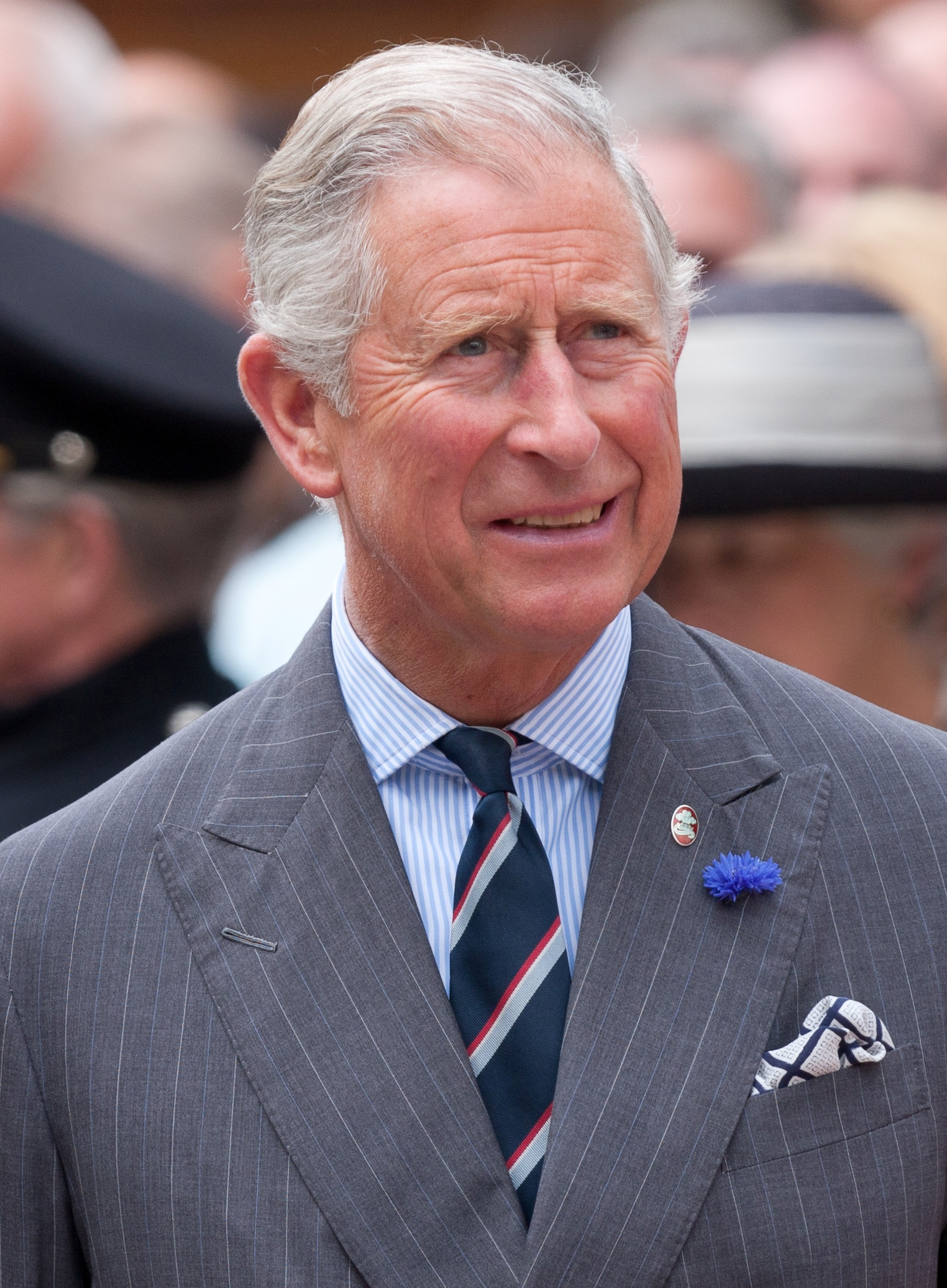
King Charles III

- King Charles III (born 1948)
- King Edward VII (1841–1910), reigned 1901–1910
- King George VI (1895–1952), reigned 1936–1952
- Prince Ranjitsinhji (1872–1933), cricketer; Indian prince
- Prince Henry, Duke of Gloucester (1900–1974), British prince
- Prince Albert Victor, Duke of Clarence and Avondale (1864–1892), British prince
- Prince William Frederick, Duke of Gloucester and Edinburgh (1776–1834), British prince

== Clergy ==
- Alfred Barry (1826–1920), Principal of King's College London (1868–1883), educationalist, and former Bishop of Sydney
- Edward White Benson (1829–1896), Archbishop of Canterbury, 1883–1896
- A. C. Bouquet (1884–1976), theologian, academic, and writer
- Arthur Buxton (1882–1958), Chaplain to the Forces and Rector of All Souls Church, Langham Place
- George Maxwell Gordon (1839–1880), Church Missionary Society missionary to India
- Matthew Blagden Hale, first Bishop of Perth; later Bishop of Brisbane, social and educational pioneer
- Joseph Barber Lightfoot (1828–1889), Bishop of Durham; theologian
- Adam Loftus (1533–1605), Archbishop of Armargh and Dublin, Lord Chancellor of Ireland
- Handley Moule (1841–1920), Bishop of Durham; theologian
- Charles Perry (1807–1891), first Bishop of Melbourne
- John A. T. Robinson(1919–1983) theologian; Bishop of Woolwich, Dean of Trinity
- John Sanderson (c.1540–1602), priest and writer on logic
- The Reverend Canon Henry Spencer Stephenson, M.A. (1871–1957), chaplain to King George VI and Queen Elizabeth II
- John Stott (1921–2011), Evangelical Church Leader
- John Tiarks (1903–1974), Bishop of Chelmsford
- Richard Chenevix Trench (1807–1888), poet, Archbishop of Dublin; theorist of English Language
- Brooke Foss Westcott (1825–1901), Canon of Westminster, Bishop of Durham
- Robin Woods (1914–1997), Dean of Windsor and Bishop of Worcester
- Justin Welby (born 1956), Archbishop of Canterbury (2013-25)

== Law and justice ==
- Maurice Amos, friend of Bertrand Russell and Quain Professor of Jurisprudence at University College London
- Robert Benson (1797–1844), barrister and judge
- Robert Carnwath, Lord Carnwath of Notting Hill (born 1945), Justice of the Supreme Court of the United Kingdom
- Sue Carr, Baroness Carr of Walton-on-the-Hill (born 1965), Lady Chief Justice of England and Wales
- Charles Sargent (1821 - 1900) Chief Justice of the Bombay High Court
- Nicholas Conyngham Tindal (1776–1786), celebrated lawyer and judge
- John Copley, 1st Baron Lyndhurst (1772–1863), lawyer; Lord Chancellor 1827–1830; 1834–1835; 1841–1846
- Kenelm George Digby (1890–1944), High Court judge in India
- Sir Robert Filmer (1588–1653), barrister, political philosopher
- Sir Christopher Floyd (born 1951), Lord Justice Floyd, appointed Lord Justice of Appeal in 2013
- Sir Travers Humphreys (1867–1956), judge
- George Jeffreys, 1st Baron Jeffreys (1645–1689), judge; Bloody Assizes; Lord Chancellor
- Frederic William Maitland (1850–1906), legal historian
- Sir Frederick Pollock (1845–1937), jurist
- Lord Richards (born 1951), Justice of the Supreme Court of the United Kingdom
- Paul Sandlands (1878–1962), judge, Recorder of Birmingham
- James Scarlett, 1st Baron Abinger (1769–1844), judge, Lord Chief Baron of the Exchequer
- Edward Vernon Utterson (c.1776–1856), lawyer; one of the Six Clerks in Chancery; literary antiquary, collector and editor
- Lord Walker of Gestingthorpe, Lord of Appeal in Ordinary; Justice of the Supreme Court
- Humphrey Weld (of Lulworth) (1612–1685), lawyer; JP; MP; Gentleman of the Privy Chamber; landowner and recusant

== Media and journalists ==
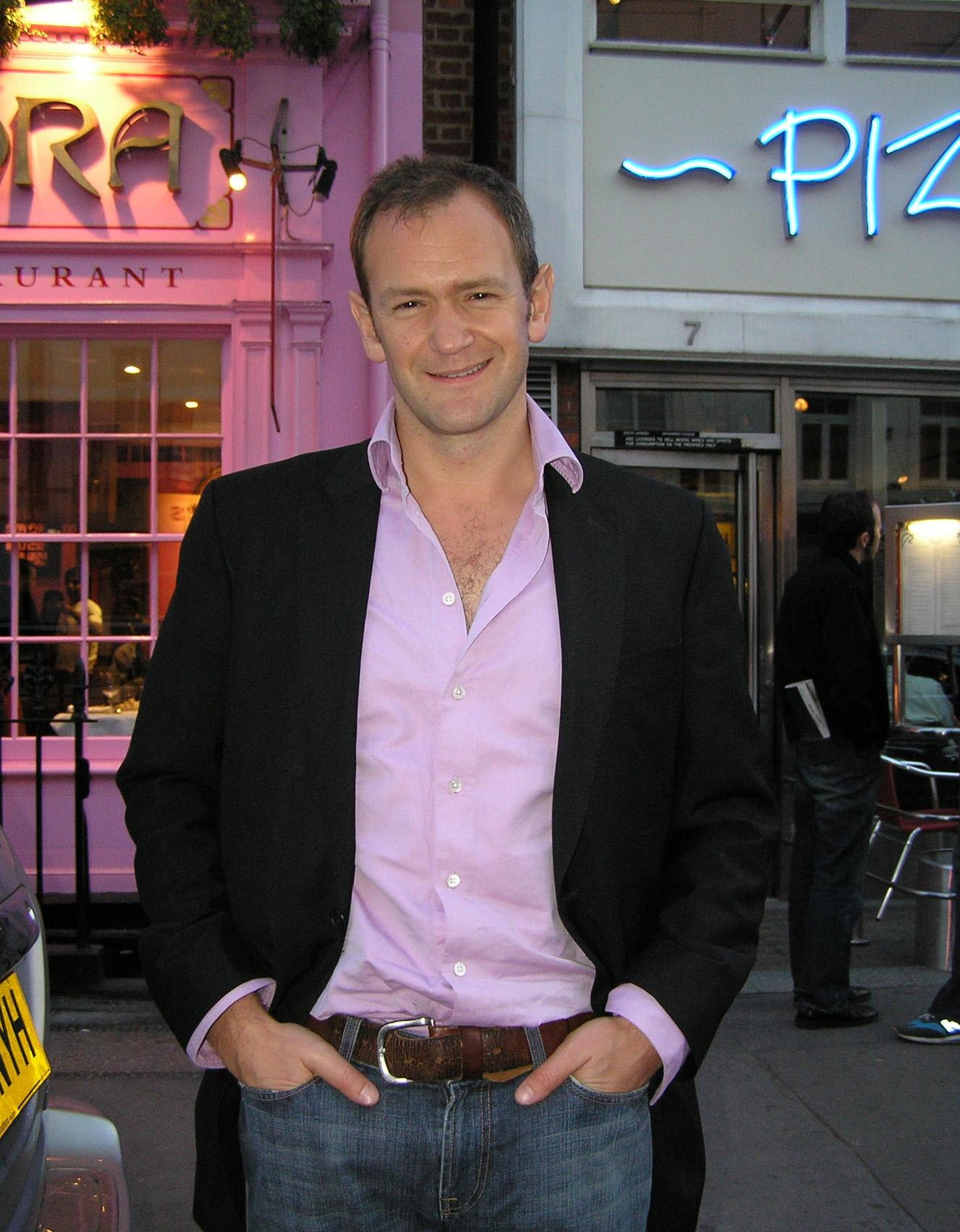
Alexander Armstrong actor, television presenter and comedian

- Alexander Armstrong (born 1970), actor, television presenter, and comedian, known for The Armstrong and Miller Show and hosting Pointless with Richard Osman
- Hilary Bell (1965-2010), television producer
- John Drummond (1934–2006), broadcaster, arts administrator, writer, director of BBC Proms and Radio 3
- Ambrose Evans-Pritchard, journalist and writer
- Ian Fells, energy adviser and broadcaster
- Vanessa Feltz (born 1962), journalist and broadcaster
- Stephen Frears (born 1941), film director
- Mel Giedroyc (born 1968), comedian and television presenter; The Great British Bake Off
- James Harding (born 1969), editor of The Times
- Wesley Kerr (born 1958), royal correspondent and horticulturalist
- Jonathan King (born 1944), pop impresario jailed for sexually abusing boys
- India Knight (born 1965), author and journalist
- John Lloyd (born 1951), comedy writer and television producer, known for the likes of the Blackadder series, Spitting Image, Not the Nine O'Clock News, The News Quiz and QI
- Richard Osman (born 1970), television presenter and producer, co-host of Pointless
- Eddie Redmayne (born 1982), Oscar-winning actor
- Herbert Vivian (born 1865), writer, journalist and newspaper proprietor

== Academics and scientists ==
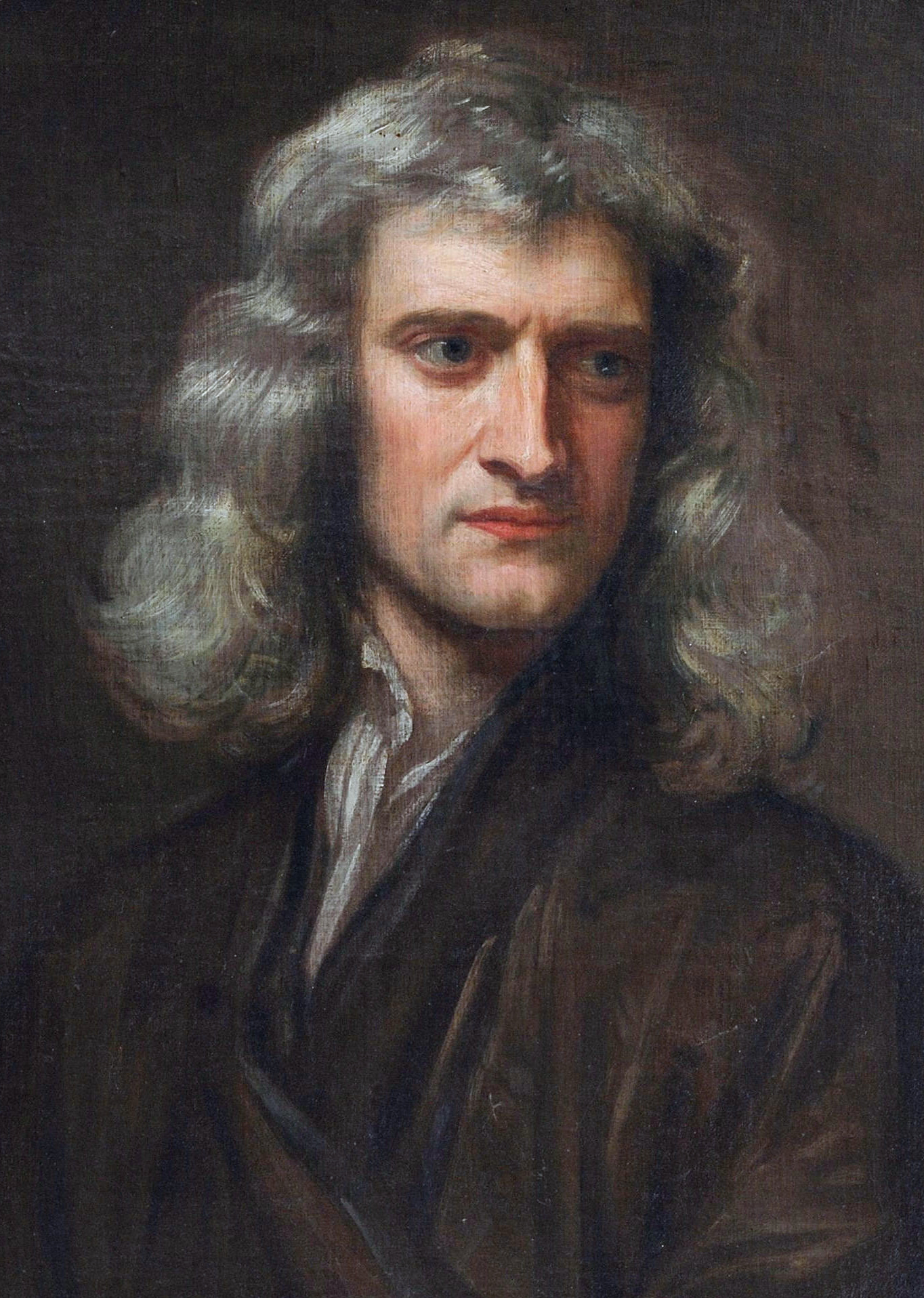
Sir Isaac Newton, one of the most influential scientists of all time

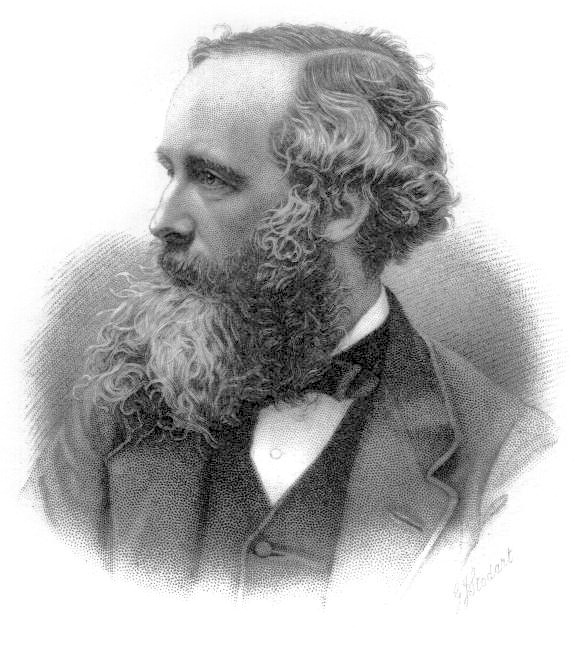
James Clerk Maxwell, Scottish physicist

- John Dalberg-Acton, 1st Baron Acton (1834–1902), historian
- Joseph Arthur Arkwright (1864–1944), bacteriologist, FRS
- Thomas Babington Macaulay, 1st Baron Macaulay (1800–1859), historian, politician, and essayist
- John Haden Badley (1865–1967), educationalist, founder (1893) and headmaster (1893–1935) of Bedales School
- John Bell, Professor of Law, Fellow of Pembroke College, Cambridge
- Selig Brodetsky, President of the Hebrew University of Jerusalem
- James Challis (1803–1882), astronomer; twice observed Neptune without noting it, before its discovery
- Jared Diamond (born 1937), US physiologist and biogeographer, Pulitzer Prize winner
- Simon Digby (1932–2010), Oriental scholar
- Sir Arthur Eddington (1882–1944), astronomer
- Sir James Frazer (1854–1941), anthropologist; writer, The Golden Bough
- Donald M. Friedman (1929–2019), scholar of Renaissance literature at University of California, Berkeley
- Sir Francis Galton (1822–1911), scientist; meteorology, heredity
- Thomas Gaskell (1916–1995), oceanographer and geophysicist
- Tudor Morley Griffith (1951–2011), radiologist
- Christopher Grigson (1926–2001), electrical engineer and naval architect
- George Herbert, 5th Earl of Carnarvon (1866–1923), Egyptologist; funded the discovery of Tutankhamun's tomb
- Christopher Hinton, Baron Hinton of Bankside (1901–1983), nuclear engineer; constructed Calder Hall, the first large scale reactor
- Tristram Hunt (born 1974), historian and former politician
- Henry Jackson (1839–1921), classicist and reformer, Vice Master, 1914
- Ian Jacobs (born 1957), gynaecologist and academic
- David Gwilym James (1905–1968), Vice-Chancellor of the University of Southampton, 1952–1968
- Sir Richard Jebb (1841–1905), Greek scholar
- Lawrence Lessig (born 1961), leading US cyberlaw expert, founder of the Creative Commons movement, and free software advocate
- Ling Wang (1917–1994), historian of science
- George Campbell Macaulay (1852–1915), classical scholar
- Kate Marvel, American climate scientist
- Thant Myint-U (1966-), historian
- Sir Bernard Pares (1867–1956), historian in Russian history
- Nicholas Patrick (born 1964), NASA astronaut
- Richard Porson (1759–1808), classical scholar
- Alfred Radcliffe-Brown (1881–1955), social anthropologist
- Vilayanur Ramachandran (born 1947), psychologist, neuroscientist
- John Ray (1627–1705), naturalist; created the principles of plant classification
- Charles Rolls (1877–1910), co-founder of Rolls-Royce; aviator
- Hugh James Rose (1795–1838), Principal of King's College London (1836–1833)
- Victor Rothschild, 3rd Baron Rothschild (1910–1990), zoologist, suspected Soviet sympathizer
- J. F. Roxburgh (1888–1954), classicist, first head master of Stowe School
- W.A.H. Rushton (1901–1980), physiologist, one time president of the Society for Psychical Research
- Adam Sedgwick (1785–1873), geologist
- Cedric Smith (1917–2002), statistician and geneticist
- John Maynard Smith (1920–2004), evolutionary biologist and geneticist
- James Spedding (1808–1881), scholar; editor of Bacon's Works
- William Fox Talbot (1800–1877), inventor of photography
- John Arthur Todd (1908–1994), geometer
- Sir George Otto Trevelyan (1838–1928), historian; MP; father of G. M. Trevelyan
- William Thomas Tutte (1917–2002), Bletchley Park codebreaker and graph theorist
- John Waterlow (1913–2010), physiologist specialising in childhood malnutrition
- Tim Westoll (1919–1999), ornithologist
- George Michael Wickens (1918–2006), linguist and humanities scholar
- Francis Willughby (1635–1672), naturalist

=== Mathematicians ===
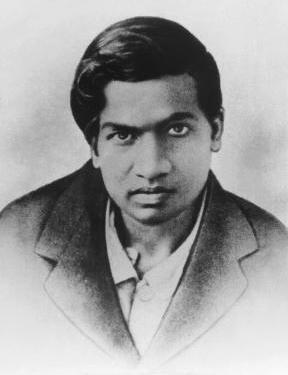
Srinivasa Ramanujan, Indian mathematician

- Sir Michael Atiyah (1929–2019), mathematician, Fields Medal and Abel Prize winner
- Charles Babbage (1791–1871), mathematician, inventor of the automated programmable computer (transferred to Peterhouse before graduating)
- Martin Beale (1928–1985), applied mathematician and statistician, FRS
- Hermann Bondi (1919–2005), mathematician and cosmologist
- Richard Borcherds (born 1959), mathematician, Fields Medallist
- Selig Brodetsky (1888–1954), mathematician, President of the Hebrew University of Jerusalem
- Arthur Cayley (1821–1895), mathematician; non-Euclidean geometry, invented matrices
- Sydney Chapman (1888–1970), mathematician, geophysicist; kinetic theory, geomagnetism
- W. R. Dean (1896–1973), mathematician and fluid dynamicist
- Sir Timothy Gowers (born 1963), mathematician, Fields Medal winner, combinatorics, Banach space
- G. H. Hardy (1877–1947), mathematician; A Mathematician's Apology, analytic number theory, Savilian Professor of Geometry in Oxford
- Sir James Jeans (1877–1946), astronomer, mathematician; stellar evolution
- John Edensor Littlewood (1885–1977), mathematician; Fourier Series, Zeta Function, Rouse Ball Professor of Mathematics in Cambridge
- Edward Arthur Milne (1896–1950), mathematician
- Henry Wilbraham (25 July 1825 – 13 February 1883) periodic function.
- Augustus De Morgan (1806–1871), mathematician; symbolic logic
- Sir Isaac Newton (1642–1727), mathematician, physicist; MP (Cambridge University)
- John Pell (1610–1685), mathematician
- Srinivasa Ramanujan (1887–1920), mathematician; analytic number theory, elliptic integrals
- John Frankland Rigby (1933–2014), a specialist in complex analysis
- James H. Wilkinson (1919–1986), mathematician
- John William Strutt (1842–1919), The Lord Rayleigh, mathematician

=== Philosophers ===
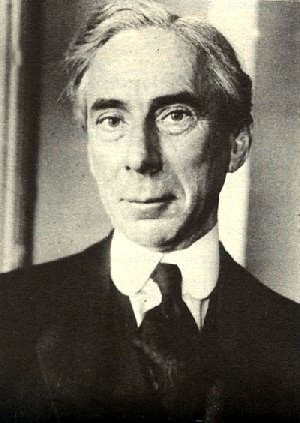
Bertrand Russell, philosopher, logician, mathematician, historian, and social critic

- Simon Blackburn (born 1944), philosopher
- C. D. Broad (1887–1971), philosopher
- Ian Hacking (1936–2023), Canadian philosopher
- J. M. E. McTaggart (1866–1925), philosopher
- G. E. Moore (1873–1958), philosopher
- Frank Plumpton Ramsey (1903–1930), philosopher, mathematician, economist
- Bertrand Russell (1872–1970), philosopher
- Henry Sidgwick (1838–1900), philosopher, major proponent of women's colleges
- A. N. Whitehead (1861–1947), philosopher, mathematician
- Ludwig Wittgenstein (1889–1951), philosopher

=== Physicists ===
- Sir George Airy (1801–1895), astronomer, geophysicist
- Alan R. Bishop (born 1947), theoretical physicist
- Niels Bohr (1885–1962), quantum physicist
- Subrahmanyan Chandrasekhar (1910–1995), astrophysicist who was awarded the 1983 Nobel Prize in Physics
- Freeman Dyson (1923–2020), physicist, proponent of the Search for Extra-Terrestrial Intelligence, Templeton Prize winner
- Thomas Eckersley (1886–1959), theoretical physicist and expert on radio waves
- Otto Frisch (1904–1979), nuclear physicist; first used the term 'nuclear fission'
- Louis Harold Gray (1905–1965), invented the field of radiobiology; namesake of unit of absorbed dose Gray
- J. B. Gunn (1928–2008), physicist; inventor of the Gunn diode
- Thomas Gold (1920–2004), astrophysicist
- Brian Josephson (born 1940), physicist; predicted the Josephson effect
- James Clerk Maxwell (1831–1879), physicist; electromagnetism
- William George Penney (1909–1991), nuclear physicist
- John Polkinghorne (1930–2021), physicist, religious thinker, Templeton Prize winner
- Rajendran Raja (1948–2014), high-energy particle physicist who played a key role in the discovery of the top quark
- Martin Ryle (1918–1984), radio astronomer; invented aperture synthesis
- Dennis William Sciama (1926–1999), physicist; played a major role in developing British physics after the Second World War
- Sir Geoffrey Ingram Taylor (1886–1975), physicist, mathematician; fluid dynamics, crystals
- Sir George Paget Thomson (1892–1975), physicist; electron diffraction
- Sir Peter Williams, physicist
- Jamal Nazrul Islam ( mathematical physicist and cosmologist)

== Writers ==
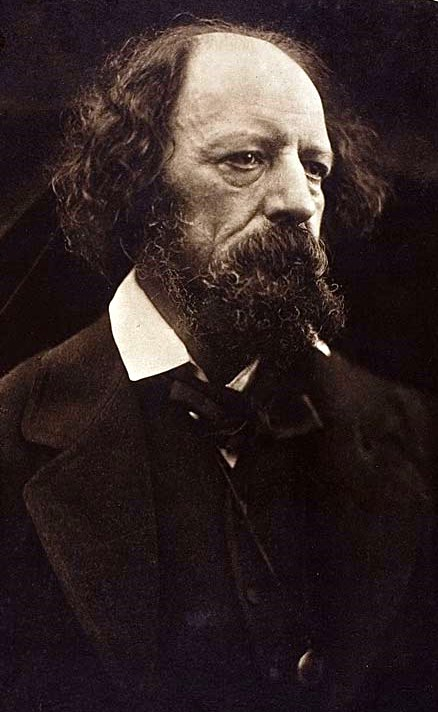
Lord Tennyson, poet

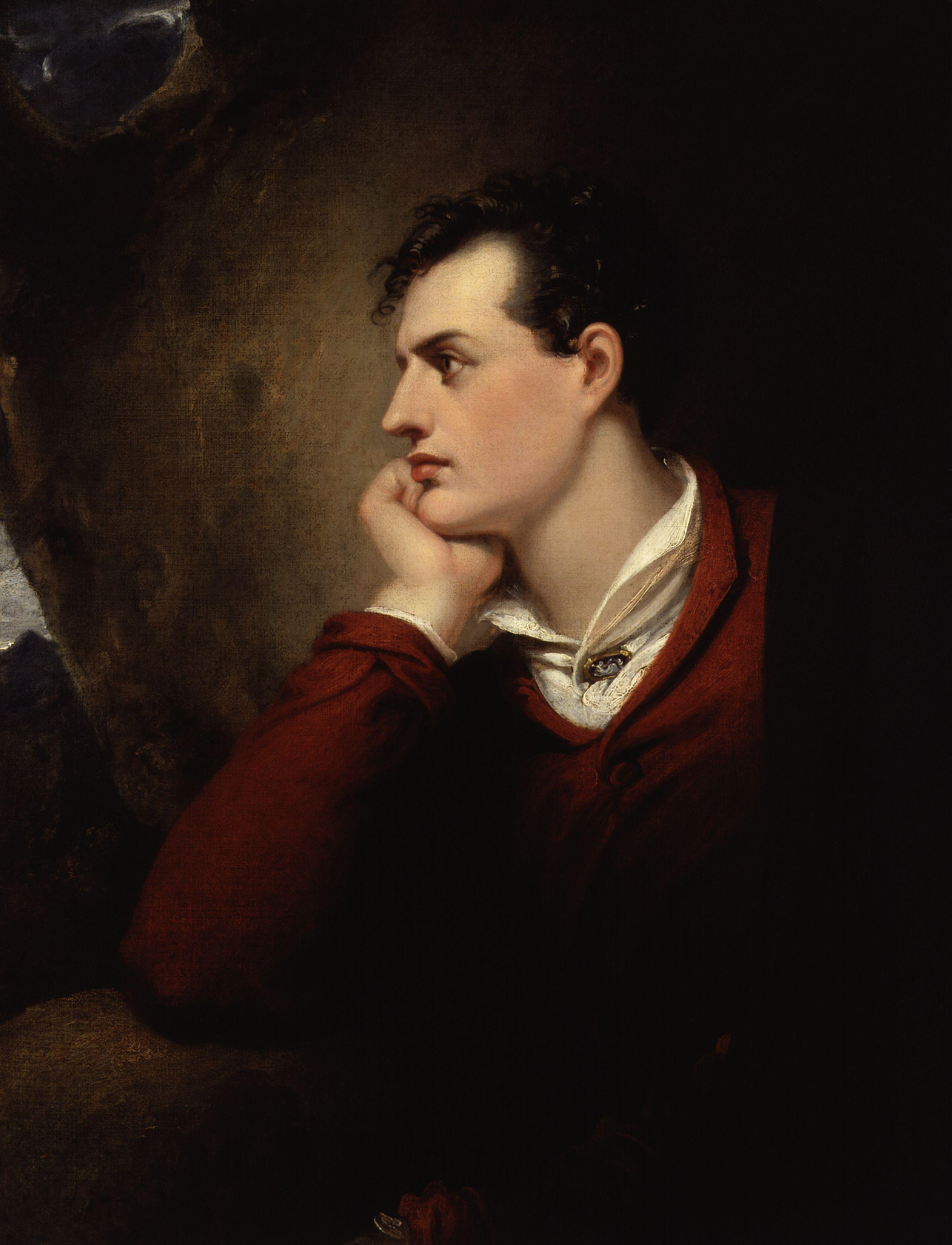
Lord Byron, poet

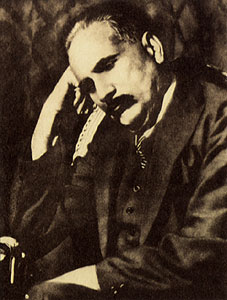
Muhammad Iqbal, Islamic poet and philosopher

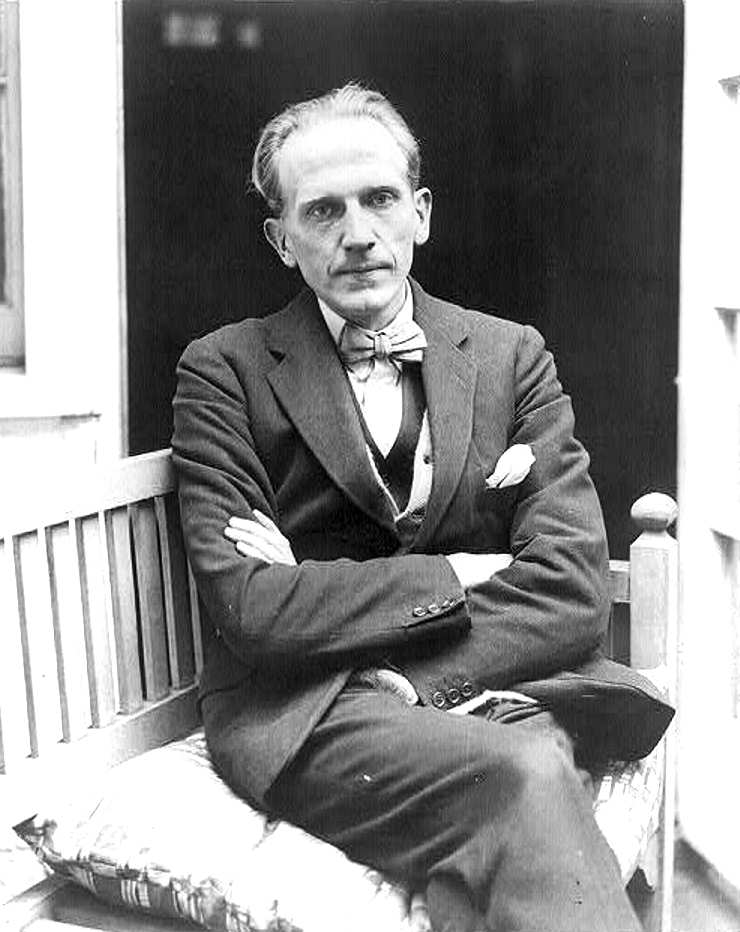
A. A. Milne, writer, author of Winnie the Pooh children's novels

- Clive Bell (1881–1964), art and literary critic; husband of Vanessa
- Richard Blackburne (born 1652), writer and medical doctor
- Charles Astor Bristed (1820–1874), American author and scholar
- George Gordon Byron, 6th Baron Byron (1788–1824), poet; "She Walks in Beauty", Don Juan
- Edward Hallet Carr (1892–1982), writer and international relations theorist
- Erskine Childers (1870–1922), writer, Irish Nationalist; The Riddle of the Sands
- Abraham Cowley (1618–1667), poet, dramatist – The Mistress
- George Crabbe (1754–1832), poet; did not matriculate
- Aleister Crowley (1875–1947), writer, poet, occultist, and 'Magician'; Magick in Theory and Practice
- Richard Cumberland (1732–1811), playwright; The Brothers, The West Indian
- Warwick Deeping (1877–1950), novelist
- Robert Devereux, 2nd Earl of Essex (1566–1601), soldier, courtier to Elizabeth I; executed for rebellion
- John Dryden (1631–1700), Poet Laureate; "Absalom and Achitophel"; translator of Virgil
- Edward FitzGerald (1809–1883), poet; Rubáiyát of Omar Khayyám
- Giles Fletcher (1588–1623), poet; "Christ's Victory" and "Triumph"
- George Gascoigne (1525–1577), poet, dramatist; "Jocasta", "The Glasse of Government"
- Edmund Gosse (1845–1928), poet, critic; On Viol and Flute
- Thom Gunn (1929–2004), Modernist poet
- George Herbert (1593–1633), poet
- Thomas Kibble Hervey (1799–1859), poet, critic
- A. E. Housman (1859–1936), poet, classical scholar
- Henry Hyndman (1842–1921), English writer and politician
- Muhammad Iqbal (1875–1938), Islamic poet and philosopher
- Stanley Mordaunt Leathes (1861–1938), poet, historian and senior civil servant
- Nathaniel Lee (1649–1692), dramatist; The Rival Queens
- John Lehmann (1907–1987), poet, man of letters; inaugurated The London Magazine
- Edward Bulwer-Lytton, 1st Baron Lytton (1803–1873), novelist; The Last Days of Pompeii; politician
- Andrew Marvell (1621–1678), poet; "Horatian Ode", "The Rehearsal Transpros'd"; MP (Hull)
- Frederick Maurice (1805–1872), theologian, writer, Christian Socialist
- A. A. Milne (1882–1956), writer; Winnie-the-Pooh
- Nicholas Monsarrat (1910–1979), novelist; The Cruel Sea, Three Corvettes
- Vladimir Nabokov (1899–1977), Russian and English novelist; Lolita
- Lenrie Peters (1932–2009), Gambian novelist, poet and educationist
- Thomas Randolph (1605–1635), poet, dramatist
- T. J. Cobden Sanderson (1840–1922), bookbinder; Arts and Crafts Movement pioneer
- Sir Henry Spelman (1562–1641), antiquary; Reliquiae Spelmannianae
- Lytton Strachey (1880–1932), biographer; Eminent Victorians; Bloomsbury Group
- Sir John Suckling (1609–1642), poet, dramatist
- Tom Taylor (1817–1880), Scottish dramatist; editor of Punch
- Alfred Tennyson, 1st Baron Tennyson (1809–1892), poet – "Maud", "In Memoriam"
- William M. Thackeray (1811–1863), novelist; Vanity Fair, Henry Esmond (dropped out after second year)
- Sir George Trevelyan, 4th Baronet (1906–1996), educator, new age thinker and writer
- George Villiers, 2nd Duke of Buckingham (1628–1687), wit, politician, dramatist; The Rehearsal; member of the 'Cabal'
- Raymond Williams (1921–1988), Marxist critic, novelist; The Country and the City
- Leonard Woolf (1880–1969), writer; husband of Virginia Woolf; Bloomsbury Group
- Geoffrey Winthrop Young (1876–1958), mountaineer and author

== Sports ==
- George 'Gubby' Allen (1902–1989), cricketer – captained England; played in Bodyline series
- Arthur Anderson, Olympic athlete
- Sir George Branson (1871–1951), Cambridge rowing blue and High Court judge
- Harry Chester Goodhart (1858–1895), twice FA Cup winner and England international footballer; Professor of Humanities at Edinburgh University
- Imogen Grant, world and Olympic champion rower
- Geoffrey Hopley, cricketer
- Alfred Paget Humphry (1850–1916), target rifle shooter and winner of the 1871 Queen's Prize, the premier competition in British fullbore shooting
- Theodore Just (1886–1937), Olympic athlete
- Edward Leader (1882–1959), Olympic athlete
- Robert Lindsay-Watson, Olympic athlete
- Dar Lyon (1898–1964), first class cricketer; Chief Justice of the Seychelles
- Duncan Macmillan, Olympic athlete
- Philip Morton (1857–1925), cricketer and schoolmaster
- Edward Ryle (1885–1952), 1908 Olympian
- Sir Peter Scott (1909–1989), artist, ornithologist; Olympic sailor (1936)
- Rev. Henry Holmes Stewart (1847–1937), FA Cup winner in 1873
- Charles Plumpton Wilson (1859–1938), England footballer and Rugby player
- H. de Winton, created the first formal set of rules for Association football (The Cambridge Rules)
- Maxwell Woosnam (1892–1965), Olympic and Wimbledon lawn tennis champion and England national football team captain
- Andy Whittall, Zimbabwe cricketer

== Spies ==
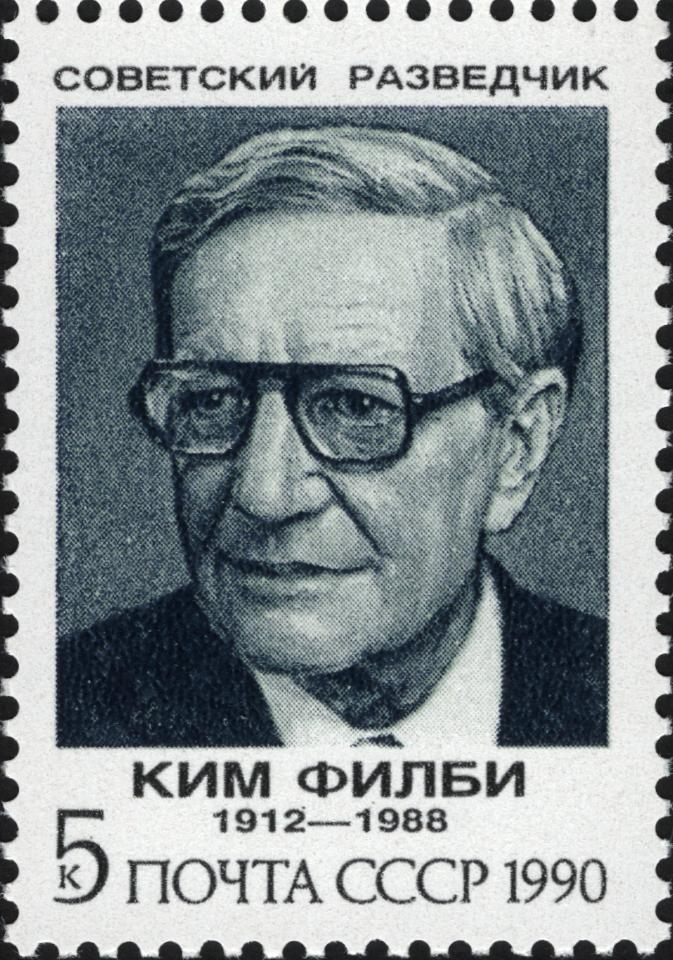
Kim Philby, Soviet spy

- Anthony Blunt (1907–1983), Soviet spy and art historian
- Guy Burgess (1910–1963), Soviet spy and traitor
- John Cairncross (1913–1995), double agent and communist
- Nicholas Elliott (1916–1994), British spy
- Michael Greenberg (1914–1992), foreign affairs economist of the U.S. Foreign Economic Administration and Soviet spy
- Kim Philby (1911–1988), double agent; communist
- Michael Whitney Straight (1916–2004), US magazine publisher, presidential speechwriter, Soviet spy

== Business ==
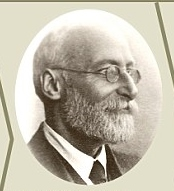
Francis Martineau Lupton, Businessman, landowner and politician

- Norman Blackwell, Baron Blackwell, (born 1952), businessman and politician
- Sir Andrew Thomas Cahn (born 1951), Vice Chairman for Public Policy of Nomura Group; former CEO of UK Trade & Investment
- Alfred Clayton Cole (1854–1920), Governor of the Bank of England
- Sanjeev Gupta (born 1971), businessman
- Sir Robin Ibbs (1926–2014), banker
- David Layton (1914–2009), National Coal Board economist and industrial relations advisor
- Francis Martineau Lupton (1848–1921), businessman, landowner, politician, magistrate, alderman and great-great-grandfather of Catherine, Princess of Wales
- Sir Michael Adrian Richards (born 1951), former UK National Cancer Director; Chief Inspector of Hospitals, Care Quality Commission, from May 2013
- Rod Smallwood (born 1950), co-manager of Iron Maiden and co-founder of Sanctuary Records
- John Tusa (born 1936), managing director of BBC World Service
- Neville Wadia (1911–1996), Bombay industrialist and philanthropist
- Simon Wolfson, Baron Wolfson of Aspley Guise (born 1967), CEO of Next plc

== Military ==
- Brigadier-General Charles Strathavon Heathcote-Drummond-Willoughby (1870–1949), soldier
- James Yorke Scarlett (1799–1871), British general and hero of the Crimean War
- David Stirling (1915–1990), founder of the Special Air Service

== Others ==
- Christopher Alexander (1936–2022), architect, author of The Timeless Way of Building and father of the design patterns movement
- Edward Chancellor, investment strategist and financial historian
- Hubert Chesshyre, retired British officer of arms found to have committed child sexual abuse
- Terry Eagleton (born 1943), literary critic
- Nathaniel Eaton (1609–1674), first schoolmaster at Harvard
- James Clerk Maxwell Garnett (1880–1958), educationist, barrister, and peace campaigner
- Sir Sarat Kumar Ghosh (1878–1962), Indian Civil Service officer
- Antony Gormley (born 1950), sculptor, best known for Angel of the North 1968–71
- Stephen Greenhalgh (born 1967), Deputy Mayor for Policing and Crime in London
- Michael Gurstein (1944–2017), Canadian community informatician
- Peter Llewellyn Gwynn-Jones (1940–2010), Garter Principal King of Arms, 1995–2010
- Arthur Henry Hallam (1811–1833), poet, firm friend of Tennyson, and subject of In Memoriam
- Sir Stuart Milner-Barry (1906–1995), chess player, World War II codebreaker, and civil servant
- William Smith O'Brien (1803–1864), Irish Nationalist
- Baron Kishichiro Okura (1882–1963), Japanese playboy and motor racing enthusiast
- St. John Philby (1885–1960), explorer of Arabia; father of Kim
- Alexander Ramsay of Mar (1919–2001), great-grandson of Queen Victoria
- Sir Benegal Narsing Rau (1887–1952), Indian Civil Service officer
- Thomas Frith, quizzer, TV personality
- Robert Vane Russell (1873–1915), Indian Civil Service officer and writer
- Anthony and Peter Shaffer (born 1926; Anthony died 2001, Peter died 2016), dramatists
- John Sowerby (1823–1902), botanist, writer and early member of the Alpine Club
- Sir Charles Villiers Stanford (1852–1924), composer, organist
- Thomas Francis Wade (1818–1895), diplomat; developed a romanization system for Mandarin Chinese that formed the basis for the Wade–Giles system
- Alex Wenham, stone carver
- Ralph Vaughan Williams (1872–1958), composer; Sea Symphony, Pilgrim's Progress
