= Thomas Digby =

Thomas Digby may refer to:

- Thomas Digby (rower), British rower
- Thomas Digby (footballer), British Army officer and footballer
