= Violet M. Digby =

British artist

Violet M. Digby (née Kidd; 1900–1960) was a British artist.

Digby was born in 1900 into the class of British colonial civil servants and engineers which by the time of her death in 1960 was fast disappearing. She came from a family where painting had been a leisure pursuit for many generations. Violet Digby and her two elder brothers were taught to draw and paint by their father William, who was a skilled draftsman, designer and engineer. Violet Digby took her talents back to India as the wife of Kenelm Digby. After Kenelm's death in 1944 she joined the community of artists in St Ives where she would remain until her suicide in 1960.

She exhibited her paintings regularly at the St Ives Society of Artists exhibitions, including the Festival of Britain Exhibition in 1951. Her paintings were accepted at the annual exhibitions of The Pastel Society, and the Royal Institute of Oil Painters in London. She also put up exhibitions in Delhi and in Cornwall. Her paintings were accepted every year but one from 1950 to 1960 by the Paris Salon of the French Society of Artists. There is an archive of her work and papers held by the Simon Digby Memorial Charity in Jersey in the Channel Islands. The charity commissioned a biographical catalogue of her work which was published in 2015. The first major exhibition of her work since her death in 1960 took place at the cultural wing of the Indian High Commission, the Nehru Centre, London in April 2016.

== Early life ==
Violet Margaret Kidd was born in Plymouth in 1900 where her Scottish father was working on the expansion of the naval dockyard. In 1905 she moved to Bombay, where her father had an engineering company, 'Lowther and Kidd'. In 1907, her family met the Carnell family while on furlough at St Jacut de la Mer in Brittany, France. Norman Carnell was at the time a railway engineer in Burma. Digby's new friend Enid Carnell was later to marry Violet Digby's brother Lewis. Mrs Kidd and Mrs Carnell became firm friends and decided to remain together in Europe with their daughters, Violet and Enid, rather than return to the East to manage their husbands' households. In 1914 Violet's father returned to England, where he was involved in the construction of one of the first aircraft factories. Violet's fragmented education continued with spells at Farlington School and helping her father at the aircraft factory.

The many surviving letters addressed to Violet after the war suggest that she was the object of a number of suitors in her busy schedule of art school, golf, tennis, skiing, dancing and everything else 'roaring twenties'. She also studied at Hastings College of Art, under Leslie Badham and Philip Cole and at the Slade School of Fine Art.

== Marriage ==
Kenelm George Digby became friendly with the Kidd family in the south of France while on furlough from India where his family had served for several generations. He proposed many times to Violet who finally accepted him in 1926 while on the rebound from a long and turbulent relationship that ended badly. Violet Digby returned to the lifestyle of a senior Memsahib of the Raj and went back to painting as her leisure pursuit. About a dozen paintings of Central Provinces and the South of France survive from this period, many paintings were lost on her return from India after the World War Two. She gave birth to a daughter Venetia in 1930 who died in her first year. Her son Simon was born in 1932. Her interest in art and painting continued to develop. In 1939 she studied with André Strauss at the École des Beaux-Arts summer school in Fontainebleau. She spent much of the Second World War in India, concerned with the 'Hospitality League' organising holidays for British soldiers and sailors based in the east. Kenelm died unexpectedly of apoplexy in 1944.

== St Ives years ==
Violet Digby returned to the UK after the war. She was attracted to the colony of artists in St Ives, Cornwall, where she was based in a cottage that she had bought. She joined the St Ives Society of Artists (StISA) in 1946 and remained a member until her death in 1960. She took a painting trip to Norway in autumn 1950 with her son Simon but still longed to return to Kashmir. Kashmir had been inaccessible to tourists since the troubles surrounding the independence and partition of India in 1947. Eventually Digby plucked up the courage to write to Prime Minister, Jawaharlal Nehru, asking for special permission. The airmail letter received a positive reply within a fortnight. Digby continued to enjoy the favour of the new Indian ruling class, she was a guest of President Rajendra Prasad at his Republic Day 'at home' on her return to India in 1958. Digby based herself on a houseboat on the Dal Lake during two long visits to India in 1952/3 and 1957/8. She often avoided unwanted attention in and around Srinagar by painting from a shikara on the rivers and canals.

== Exhibitions ==
Digby exhibited paintings in the StISA exhibitions in 1949, 1950 and in the StISA Festival of Britain Exhibition which ran from May to September 1951 and which also went on tour. She had one piece in the 1950 exhibition at the Royal Institute of Oil Painters and three pieces in their 1951 show. She held a joint exhibition with her son Simon at the Piazza Studios in St Ives in 1951. Digby had pieces included in The Pastel Society exhibitions, three in 1951 four in 1952 and one in 1953. The Pastel Society's 1951 exhibition went on tour over the following year through the north of England. She held a joint exhibition of her work with Serbjeet Singh in Delhi in 1953 and a further solo exhibition in Delhi in 1958 which was opened by Supreme Court Judge, Justice Vivian Bose. She submitted pieces to the Paris Salon of the French Society of Artists every year between 1950 and 1960 (except 1955) all of which were accepted. Her paintings of Kashmir appeared in colour on the cover of 'Kashmir' magazine. In June 1953, another of Digby's paintings appeared in colour on the cover of Kashmir magazine, this time accompanied by a black and white sketch and a full page article by Digby about painting in Kashmir. In April 2016, forty of Digby's Kashmir paintings were exhibited at the Nehru Centre in London.

== Death ==
Violet Digby had spent quite a lot of money on her expeditions to Kashmir and was financially stretched. Her brother Lewis and sister-in-law Enid, her childhood friend, advised her to join them in Jersey, where the tax regime was more favourable. By then the atmosphere in St Ives had become quite toxic between the rival schools of painters, and Digby resolved to leave. She put down a deposit on a house in the parish of Trinity, Jersey. She was involved in a seemingly minor traffic incident in London on 13 August 1960. She drove across a zebra crossing and a child ran into the side of her car, fell over and grazed his knee. Digby did not see any reason to report the incident but someone else clearly did. Some days later, a policeman came to her house in St Ives and she was given notice of an intended prosecution. On the afternoon of Friday 2 September, she went to her doctor, who prescribed barbiturates to calm her down. Later that day, she went home, took most of the pills, wrote a note to her son Simon, and switched on the gas which killed her. The coroner found that she had taken her own life while under the influence of barbiturates.
