= Royal correspondent =

Journalistic assignment pertaining to royalty

Royal correspondent is the designation often assigned to a journalist who specialises in reporting on matters concerning royalty.

Examples from the United Kingdom include Wesley Kerr, Jennie Bond and Nicholas Witchell of the BBC.

== See also ==
- Royal Rota
