= Kenelm George Digby =

British-Indian judge and administrator (1890–1944)

Kenelm George Digby (23 March 1890 – 25 September 1944) was a British civil administrator and High Court judge in India.

Digby was the son of Colonel Thomas E. Digby and Alice Isabella Sherard. He was educated at Haileybury College and studied classics at Trinity College, Cambridge. In 1913 he passed the entrance requirements for the Indian Civil Service and was appointed in 1914. From 1916 to 1920 he underwent military service: he was 2nd Lieutenant IARO 95th Russell's Infantry, 1916; Lieutenant IARO 111th Maharajas, 1917; and was attached to Southern Command Headquarters at Poona in 1918. In 1943 he was appointed Puisne Judge High Court of Judicature at Nagpur.

In 1926 Digby married Violet M. Kidd and they had one son, Simon Digby, later to become a noted oriental scholar. Digby died on 25 September 1944.

== Sources ==
- "Digby, Kenelm George", Who Was Who, A & C Black, 1920–2008; online edn, Oxford University Press, December 2007 accessed 13 Feb 2009
