= Thomas Digby (footballer) =

English footballer (1851–1919)

Personal information
- Date of birth: 20 October 1851
- Date of death: 10 June 1919 (aged 67)
- Place of death: Bideford, Devon, England
- Position: Forward

Senior career*
Years	Team	Apps	(Gls)
1873–1974	Royal Engineers		
- * Club domestic league appearances and goals

Thomas Digby (20 October 1851 – 10 June 1919) was a British Army officer in the Royal Engineers, and footballer who played as one of the two half-backs.

== Early life ==
Digby was educated at the Royal Military Academy. He earned his commission as lieutenant in the Royal Engineers by registering the highest marks of the 392 successful candidates.

== Football career ==
Digby first played football Royal Engineers A.F.C. as a back in the Sappers' 10–0 win over Rochester in February 1873. Once in the side, however, he was hardly ever omitted, and made his competitive debut as one of the six forwards for the Sappers in the 1873–74 FA Cup first round, in a 5–0 rout of Brondesbury. He played as a forward in the first two rounds, but went in goal for the semi-final win over the Swifts, returning to the forward line for the 1874 FA Cup final defeat to Oxford University.

He was one of the players selected for the Engineers' tour of northern England over Christmas and New Year 1873–74, including playing in the 4–0 win over the Sheffield Association, played half to association laws and half to Sheffield laws, in front of a crowd of 3,000 at Bramall Lane, and in the 2–1 win at Nottingham Forest.

He played as a "three-quarter back" (akin to a sweeper, between goalkeeper and half-backs) in the 5–0 win over Cambridge University in the 1874–75 FA Cup, but after one last game as a forward against Eton College two days later he does not seem to have played again.

== Post-football career ==
Digby saw active service in the Second Afghan War and promoted to Major in 1891. In 1897, he was a member of the Tochi Expedition on the North-West Frontier in British India, and retired as a Colonel.

== Personal life ==
Thomas E. Digby married Alice Isabella Sherard in 1884; they had three children, including the British Indian High Court judge Kenelm George Digby. Digby died at his home, of injuries received in a bicycle accident near the Westward Ho! golf course in May 1919; an inquest returned a verdict of accidental death, witness evidence suggesting he was not riding very quickly but had nevertheless been pitched over the handlebars, and only briefly regained consciousness soon after the accident. His epitaph - Deo non fortuna - is the motto of Epsom College.
