= Richard Blackburne =

Richard Blackburne M.D. F.R.C.P. (b. 1652) was an English physician and writer.

== Early life ==
Blackburne was born in London in 1652, and was educated at Trinity College, Cambridge, where he took his degree of B.A. in 1669. ‘ He entered on the physic line at Leyden University, 23 May 1676, at age 24. He graduated with doctor of medicine there, where his thesis was published as ‘Disputatio medica inauguralis de Sanguificatione,' &c., 8vo, Lugduni Batavorum, 1676.

== Career ==
Around 1681 Dr. Blackburne co-operated with John Aubrey, who wrote that he was ‘one of the College of Physicians, and practiseth yearly at Tunbridge Wells,’ to publicise the chalybeate springs for their curative properties. The springs were discovered by Aubrey in 1666 at Seend near Devizes. Dr. Blackburne declared them ‘to be of the nature and virtue of those at Tunbridge, and altogether as good;’ but ‘it was about 1688 before they became to be frequented’. Blackburne was admitted as an honorary fellow of the Royal College of Physicians of London, 25 June 1685. He was created a fellow of the college by the charter of King James II. He was admitted at the extraordinary comitia of 12 April 1687, and was censor in 1688.

Blackburne admired Thomas Hobbes, and it is probable that he wrote the short Latin memoir sometimes attributed to Hobbes himself, entitled Thomæ Hobbes Angli Malmesburiensis Philosophi Vita. This was also attributed to Ralph Bathurst, dean of Bath. Blackburne certainly wrote a Latin supplement to it, entitled Vitae Hobbianie Auctarium, the first sentence of which supplies the chief evidence of his authorship of the ‘Life.’ Both these works were apparently derived from a larger and fuller ‘Life’ manuscript written in English by Aubrey, and used with his knowledge and consent, and possibly with the assistance of Hobbes himself. The ‘Vita,' the ‘Auctarium,’ and the autobiographic Latin verses, ‘Thomæ Hobbes Malmesburiensis Vita Carmine expressa, Authore Seipso,’ were issued together in a volume inscribed to William, earl of Devonshire, and bearing on its title-page the mystifying imprint ‘Carolopoli: Apud Eleutherium Anglicum sub signo Veritatis, MDCLXXXI.' The penultimate page gives the place of production, ‘Londini: Apud Guil. Cooke, ad Insigne Viridis Draconis juxta portam vulgò dictam Temple Bar.' These productions form the basis of the ‘Life’ prefixed to the first collection of The Moral and Political Works of Thomas Hobbes of Malmesbury, &c., fol. London, 1750.
