= Wesley Kerr =

English broadcaster (born 1958)

Wesley Kerr OBE
- Born: Wesley Albert Kerr; August 1958 (age 68); Perivale, London, England
- Education: Trinity College, Cambridge
- Years active: 1979–present

Wesley Albert Kerr OBE (born August 1958) is an English broadcaster, filmmaker, writer, historian, and horticulturalist.

== Early life and education ==
Wesley Kerr was conceived in Jamaica but born in Perivale, London in August 1958. As his mother was not able to look after him, he was fostered at a young age to white foster parents, whom he describes as "Edwardians… very interested in the past". He was brought up in a house full of history books in Ashford, between Windsor Castle and Hampton Court, and his love of heritage and public spaces grew out of picnicking at weekends at nearby Windsor Great Park, Bushy Park or swimming in the Thames at Chertsey.

Kerr was educated in the state primary system before winning a Hampshire Open bursary to attend Winchester College, where he was the only black student. While at Winchester, he won an Open Scholarship to study history at Trinity College Cambridge from 1976 to 1979.

== Career ==
=== Broadcasting ===
After graduating from Cambridge, Kerr joined the BBC as a Production Trainee. In 1985, he became BBC TV News' first black reporter, reporting on a range of stories from the Heysel Stadium tragedy, the Windsor Castle Fire through to the Oklahoma City bomb. In addition to news, he worked on numerous BBC television and radio programmes including Nationwide, Newsnight, Panorama, Holiday, Watchdog, Health Check, and Value for Money. From 2001 to 2008, Kerr was one of the presenters of the BBC coverage of the Chelsea and Hampton Court Flower Shows, specialising in the history of plants, people and places.

Kerr was also a BBC Court Correspondent and then Royal Correspondent in the 1990s, including at the time of the death of Princess Diana and still appears in many documentaries on royalty on ITV, C4, C5 and internationally. He continues to write as a freelance for newspapers and journals and to lecture on heritage and horticulture.

In 2011, Kerr made a documentary for BBC Radio 4 about his and other boys' experiences of bursaries, When Wesley Went to Winchester.

=== Culture, heritage and gardens ===
Kerr chaired the Heritage Lottery Fund's Committee for London from 2007 to 2014, investing in parks, gardens, museums, and historic places. Kerr was elected as an Ordinary Member of the Council of the Royal Horticultural Society (RHS) in 2021 and will retire in 2026. He is a member of the RHS Governance and People Committee and has been a member of the RHS Show Gardens Panel.

During his tenure at the Heritage Lottery Fund, the HLF and the RHS supported the Garden Museum to acquire a 1905 Portrait of a Black Gardener by Harold Gilman.

Kerr co-curated the first retrospective of Jamaican artist Rudi Patterson's work, together with Novelette-Aldoni Stewart at Leighton House Museum in 2014.

Kerr was a founding Trustee of the Royal Parks charity and served for two terms between 2017 and 2025, having first served on the advisory board of the Royal Parks Agency from 2013 to 2016. He was closely involved in restoring Brompton Cemetery and sits on the Greenwich Park Revealed Programme Board.

Kerr is Vice-President of the Metropolitan Public Gardens Association.

== Recognition ==
Kerr's Radio 4 series on the Britain in Bloom competition, Wars of the Roses, was judged by the Garden Media Guild as National Radio Broadcast of the Year 2009.

Kerr was appointed Officer of the Order of the British Empire (OBE) for services to heritage in the 2015 Queen’s Birthday Honours.

== Personal life ==
Kerr lives in North London.
