= Simon Digby (oriental scholar) =

British academic (1932–2010)

Simon Everard Digby
- Born: 17 October 1932; Jabalpur, British India
- Died: 10 January 2010 (aged 77); Delhi, India
- Education: Trinity College, Cambridge, School of Oriental and African Studies
- Occupation: Oriental scholar
- Notable work: War-Horse and Elephant in the Dehli Sultanate; Sufis and Soldiers in Awrangzeb's Deccan
- Parents: Kenelm George Digby (father); Violet M. Kidd (mother)
- Awards: Richard Burton Medal, Royal Asiatic Society; D.Litt., honoris causa, Jamia Hamdard

Simon Everard Digby (17 October 1932 – 10 January 2010) was an English oriental scholar, translator, writer and collector who was awarded the Burton Medal of the Royal Asiatic Society and was a former Fellow of Wolfson College, Oxford, the Honorary Librarian of the Royal Asiatic Society and Assistant Keeper in the Department of Eastern Art of the Ashmolean Museum in Oxford. He was also the foremost British scholar of pre-Mughal India.

The author of several books, including translations from Indo-Persian and a study on Sultanate-era military history, as well as over 60 academic articles and book chapters, Digby was also highly regarded as a collector. He was a prolific reviewer of academic books, the reviews themselves described as "probing and erudite" in a 2022 volume devoted to his method and legacy. William Dalrymple described him as "fabulously eccentric" and "the sort of independent scholar who no longer exists"; in an obituary, the historian Irfan Habib characterised him as "a scholar different from all others in the attention that he paid to the minutiae and curiosities of history". At his death, he left behind a large body of unpublished work, which the trustees of his estate have arranged to be edited and posthumously published.

== Life and career ==
=== Early life ===
Digby was born in 1932 at Jabalpur in the Central Provinces, now Madhya Pradesh. Simon Digby's father was Kenelm George Digby, a judge of the Indian High Court, and his mother was Violet M. Kidd, an accomplished painter. As his father was a friend of J. F. Roxburgh, the first headmaster of Stowe School, Digby was sent to that school (1946–1951) after attending a preparatory school in North Wales. In 1951 he went with his mother on a painting expedition to Delhi, Rajasthan and Kashmir. On his return to Britain he attended Trinity College, Cambridge (Major and Senior Scholar, Earl of Derby Student), 1951–1956; History Tripos, University of Cambridge (BA Cantab., 1st Class Honours with Distinction) 1956; proceeded MA 1962.

=== Cambridge ===
Digby knew how to read Urdu and Hindi, and while at the University of Cambridge he attended classes in Persian and began to publish his own translations of Persian poems. He lived in Whewell's Court and it was here that he welcomed Amartya Sen when he arrived in Cambridge in the summer of 1954. In 1957 he returned to India for two years sponsored by a grant from the Worshipful Company of Goldsmiths. During this time he learned about Indian art history and museology, having spent time at what was then known as the Prince of Wales Museum of Western India. In 1959 he travelled to Pakistan, where he visited Lahore, Rawalpindi, Balakot, the Kaghan Valley and Peshawar, among other places. On his return to London Digby lived in a tiny house in Camberwell while he studied for a PhD at the School of Oriental and African Studies where he focused on the Sultanate period.

=== Academic career ===
In 1962 he returned to India where he spent almost a year in Hyderabad and another year in Delhi during which period he wrote on Indian history and contributed an article on the Emperor Humayun to the Encyclopaedia of Islam. This was his first article for this work. He also contributed to the first volume of The Cambridge Economic History of India. His first major article was 'Dreams and Reminiscences of Dattu Sarvani, a Sixteenth Century Indo-Afghan Soldier' for the Indian Economic and Social History Review, which sprang from Digby's interest in medieval Indian warfare and Indian Sufism. On his return to London he became a regular reviewer in The Journal of the Royal Asiatic Society, the Bulletin of the School of Oriental and African Studies and The Times Literary Supplement. From 1968 to 1984 he was the Honorary Librarian of the Royal Asiatic Society, which involved him in ordering and cataloguing the Society's collections. In 1969, he was elected a Research Fellow at Wolfson College, Oxford. In 1970, he delivered a paper at the Seminar on Aspects of Religion in South Asia at SOAS entitled 'Encounters with Jogīs in Indian Sūfī Hagiography', which David Gordon White later described as "what may be the most widely circulated unpublished manuscript in the field of South Asian studies."

In 1971 Digby hitch-hiked to Venice with a friend, who was later the BBC World Service's regional manager in Delhi. The two left Venice and travelled by sea to Rhodes and Anatolia, and then on public transport through Turkey to Tehran, Kerman, Zahidan and Quetta. Digby was in Karachi when war broke out between India and Pakistan, and here he privately published his book War-Horse and Elephant in the Dehli Sultanate. In 1972 he was appointed to a post in the Department of Eastern Art of the Ashmolean Museum in Oxford, which had been created for David McCutchion, who had died before he could take it up. This was to be Simon's only full-time paid position, he having benefitted from a number of legacies from deceased relatives. At the Ashmolean, and on a tight budget, he made a series of purchases of Indian decorative arts that were exceptional for their quality. Around this time, he was the inspiration for two oil-on-wood abstract paintings by the Turner Prize-winning British artist Howard Hodgkin: "Small Simon Digby", and "Simon Digby Talking".

As an ex-officio member of the Oriental Faculty of the University of Oxford (1972–2000), Digby was responsible for supervising postgraduate students, and gave instruction in Hindi, Urdu and Persian. In addition, he examined postgraduate theses including that of Michael Nazir-Ali. Digby also served as visiting professor in Paris and Naples, where he lectured on Sufism and architecture. In 1999 Digby was awarded the Burton Medal of the Royal Asiatic Society and delivered a paper later published privately as Richard Burton: the Indian Making of an Arabist. In his latter years Digby lived in a cottage in Jersey which had been left to him by a relative. From here he made annual visits to India. In January 2003, he was conferred the degree of D.Litt. honoris causa from Jamia Hamdard, New Delhi.

=== Death and legacy ===
Simon Digby died of pancreatic cancer in Delhi on 10 January 2010, having been diagnosed with the disease only on 28 December 2009. He had been due to deliver a talk at the India International Centre entitled "A Runaway Mughal Prince" at the invitation of the Indian National Trust for Art and Cultural Heritage. He was cremated in India on 14 January 2010 and his ashes immersed in flowing water. Digby was unmarried and left no close relatives.

The trustees of his will, in the absence of clear instructions about what to do with his estate, sold his most valuable artefacts (many at auction in 2011) and established the Simon Digby Memorial Charity to promote the study of subjects in which Simon Digby was interested. The Charity funded a post doctoral fellowship at the School of Oriental and African Studies, University of London. A conference held in Digby's honour in June 2014 resulted in the publication of a volume on his historical method, edited by Francesca Orsini and published by Oxford University Press in 2022. The fellowship has also funded the completion of Simon Digby's unpublished academic work, which is being published in the 11-volume series The Life and Works of Simon Digby. The trustees also donated Digby's collection of chiefly Indo-Persian manuscripts to the Bodleian Library, University of Oxford.

== Scholarship ==
Simon Digby's scholarly interests spanned a wide range of areas and fields. He is primarily known as an historian of Sultanate-era north India, in its social, economic, political, military and religious aspects. His keen interest in Sufism – extending into the Mughal period – informed much of his work in that field, as he (following the work of Mohammad Habib, K. A. Nizami, and Syed Hasan Askari) investigated "the important sidelights on Indo-Muslim history [that] are to be found in Sufi literature." His early interest in the art of the Indian subcontinent is evidenced in some of his earliest publications, and was sustained throughout his career; this was supplemented by ventures into architecture and numismatics. Significant other interests included sub-continental travel writing from the pre-modern period through to the era of European colonialism, "Wonder-Tales" and comparative folklore, and a subset of his work developing from interests in the works and trajectories of both Richard Burton and Rudyard Kipling, and their contemporaries.

=== Sultanate history ===
Digby's first major piece of Sultanate-era history was his 1971 monograph War-horse and Elephant in the Dehli Sultanate: A Study of Military Supplies. This was self-published under the imprint 'Orient Monographs', and printed in Karachi. In his review of the book, the historian Derek Latham laid out the major historiographical intervention made by Digby:

In the present century various theories have been advanced to explain the initial military success and the subsequent long survival of the sultanate. Indian modernists have argued that, because of the caste system, the indigenous population lacked a sense of national unity and cohesion. Indian Muslims, on the other hand, have contended that the lower castes were quick to see in Islam their salvation and delivery from the tyranny of the higher castes and accordingly welcomed their Muslim invaders. On the military side others have held that mounted combat, in which the Muslims excelled, was unfamiliar to their Hindu opponents. Dismissing the two political theses as tendentious (which undoubtedly they are, though I myself would not say that they are devoid of all truth), Simon Digby concentrates on the military aspect of the matter and cites evidence, first, against the notion that the Hindus had no experience of mounted combat and, secondly, against the idea that the Muslim conquest and ascendancy were based on superior weapons of close combat such as the sword.

Digby contributed three pieces to The Cambridge Economic History of India, Volume 1: c.1200–c.1750, edited by Tapan Raychaudhuri and Irfan Habib and published in 1982, on ‘Economic Conditions before 1200’, ‘The Currency System’ and ‘The Maritime Trade of India’ in the period. Later in his career he produced other macro-level studies of the period: on Indo-Persian historiography (2001b); and what he termed the 'provincialisation' of the Delhi Sultanate in the course of the fourteenth century (2004a).

Digby also concentrated on what Irfan Habib described as 'the curiosities and minutiae of history': examples include his investigation of the correct location of the tomb of Buhlul Lodi (1975a) and the correct name of Sultan Iltutmish (1970b).

== Publications ==
=== Collected works (posthumous) ===
- 2024. The Life and Works of Simon Digby, Volume I: Against the Mughals: Dreams and Wars of Dattū Sarvānī, a Sixteenth-Century Indo-Afghan Soldier, edited by David Lunn, with an introduction by Samira Sheikh, Delhi: Primus Books ISBN 9789361773877 (HB), ISBN 9789361777028 (PoD).
- 2025a. The Life and Works of Simon Digby, Volume II: Encounters with Jogīs in Indian Sūfī Hagiography, edited by David Lunn, with an introduction by James Mallinson, Delhi: Primus Books ISBN 9789368830467 (HB), ISBN 9789368839880 (PoD).
- 2025b. The Life and Works of Simon Digby, Volume III: Sufis in the Life of Medieval India, edited by David Lunn, with an introduction by Nile Green, Delhi: Primus Books ISBN 9789368831983 (HB), ISBN 9789368833673 (PoD).
- 2026a. The Life and Works of Simon Digby, Volume IV: Tales, Translations, Trajectories: Literary and Linguistic Journeys in South Asia and Beyond, edited by David Lunn, with an introduction by Francesca Orsini, Delhi: Primus Books ISBN 9789371795654 (HB).
- 2026b. The Life and Works of Simon Digby, Volume V: War-Horse and Elephant in the Dehli Sultanate: A Study of Military Supplies (Revised Edition, with Other Writings), edited by David Lunn, with an introduction by Thomas R. Trautmann, Delhi: Primus Books ISBN 9789309610677 (HB).

=== Books ===
- 1971a. War-Horse and Elephant in the Dehli Sultanate, Oxford: Orient Monographs ISBN 9780903871006.
- 1979a. The Royal Asiatic Society: its History and Treasures, Leiden and London (edited with Stuart Simmonds) ISBN 9780947593353.
- 1979b. Paintings from Mughal India, London: Colnaghi (with Toby Falk) ISBN 9780904221145.
- 1982a. Toy Soldiers and Ceremonial in Post-Mughal India, Oxford: The Ashmolean Museum (with James Harle) ISBN 9780900090912.
- 2000. Wonder Tales of South Asia, Jersey: Orient Monographs ISBN 9780903871013/New Delhi: Oxford University Press, 2006 ISBN 9780195683639. Divotvorní náthové: mystické příběhy jóginů, súfijců a dervišů z hindské a indoperské literatury (Czech translation), Plzeň/Pilsen: Siddhaika, 2014, ISBN 9788090513020.
- 2001a. Sufis and Soldiers in Awrangzeb's Deccan, Delhi: Oxford University Press ISBN 9780195644616.
- 2006a. Richard Burton: The Indian Making of an Arabist, Jersey: Orient Monographs ISBN 9780903971027.

=== Articles and chapters ===
- 1957. 'Some Notes towards the Classification of Muslim Copper and Brass Work in the Museum', Bulletin of the Prince of Wales Museum of Western India, Bombay, 1955–1957, 5: pp. 15–23.
- 1964a. 'Pir Hasan Shah and the History of Kashmir', Indian Economic and Social History Review, 1, 3: pp. 3–7. doi:10.1177/001946466400100306
- 1964b. 'A Seventeenth Century Indo-Portuguese Writing Cabinet', Bulletin of the Prince of Wales Museum of Western India, 8: pp. 23–28.
- 1965. 'Dreams and Reminiscences of Dattu Sarvani, a Sixteenth Century Indo-Afghan Soldier', The Indian Economic and Social History Review, 2, 1: pp. 52–80 doi:10.1177/001946466400200104 and 2, 2: 178–94. doi:10.1177/001946466400200205
- 1967. 'The Literary Evidence for Painting in the Delhi Sultanate', Bulletin of the American Academy of Benares, 1, 1: pp. 47–58.
- 1970a. 'Encounters with Jogīs in Indian Sūfī Hagiography', Proceedings of the Seminar on Aspects of Religion in South Asia, cyclostyle, SOAS University of London. PDF.
- 1970b. 'Iletmish or Iltutmish? A reconsideration of the name of the Dehlī Sultan'. Iran 8: pp. 57–64. doi:10.2307/4299632
- 1971b. 'Humāyūn', in P. Bearman, Th. Bianquis, C. E. Bosworth, E. van Donzel, W. P. Heinrichs (eds), Encyclopaedia of Islam, Second Edition. Leiden: Brill. doi:10.1163/1573-3912_islam_SIM_2955
- 1972. 'A Medieval Kashmiri Bronze Vase', Art and Archaeology Research Papers.
- 1973a. 'The Bhugola of Ksema karna: a Dated Sixteenth century piece of Indian Metalware', Art and Archaeology Research Papers, pp. 10–31.
- 1973b. 'A Corpus of 'Mughal' Glass', Bulletin of the School of Oriental and African Studies 36, 1: 80–88. doi:10.1017/S0041977X00098001
- 1973c. 'The Fate of Dāniyāl, Prince of Bengal, in the Light of an Unpublished Inscription', Bulletin of the School of Oriental and African Studies, 36, 3: pp. 588–602. doi:10.1017/S0041977X0011986X
- 1974a. 'More Historic Kashmir Metalwork?', Iran 12: pp. 181–185. doi:10.2307/4300509
- 1974b. 'A Qur'an from the East African Coast', Art and Archaeology Research Papers, pp. 50–55.
- 1974c. 'The Coinage and Genealogy of the Later Jams of Sind', Journal of the Royal Asiatic Society, pp. 125–134. doi:10.1017/S0035869X00157491
- 1975a. 'The Tomb of Buhlūl Lōdī'. Bulletin of the School of Oriental and African Studies, 38, 3: pp. 550–561. doi:10.1017/S0041977X00048084
- 1975b. 'Abd al-Quddus Gangohi (1456–1537 A.D.): the Personality and Attitudes of a Medieval Indian Sufi Shaykh', in Medieval India: a Miscellany, volume III, Aligarh: Aligarh Muslim University, pp. 1–66. ISBN 9780210405819
- 1975c. 'The Waterseller’s Pilgrimage', Lycidas, Wolfson College, Oxford, 3: pp. 20–21.
- 1976. 'Sufis and Travellers in the Early Dehli Sultanate: the Evidence of the Fawā‘id al-fu’ād', in Attar Singh (ed.), Socio-Cultural Impact of Islam on India, Chandigarh: University of the Punjab, pp. 171–177. [Second edition 2002, ISBN 9788185322292]
- 1978a. 'Kāfūr', in Encyclopaedia of Islam, 2, Leiden: Brill. doi:10.1163/1573-3912_islam_SIM_3782
- 1978b. 'Kayḳubād', in Encyclopaedia of Islam, 2, Leiden: Brill. doi:10.1163/1573-3912_islam_SIM_4060
- 1978c. 'Ispahsālār, Sipahsālār', (with C. E. Bosworth) in Encyclopaedia of Islam, 2, Leiden: Brill. doi:10.1163/1573-3912_islam_COM_0391
- 1978d. 'Iṣṭabl', (with F. Viré, G. S. Colin, and C. E. Bosworth) in Encyclopaedia of Islam, 2, Leiden: Brill. doi:10.1163/1573-3912_islam_COM_0392
- 1979c. 'Popular Mughal illustrations of Omens', in Toby Falk and Simon Digby, Paintings from Mughal India. London: Colnaghi, pp. 13–19.
- 1979d. 'A Shah-nama Illustrated in a popular Mughal Style', in Simmonds and Digby, ed., The Royal Asiatic Society: its History and Treasures, London, pp. 111–115.
- 1980a. 'Coinage in the Reign of Sultan Feroz Tughluq—a Literary Reference', Numismatic Digest 4, 2: pp. 26–31.
- 1980b. 'The Broach Coin-Hoard as Evidence of the Import of Valuta across the Arabian Sea during the 13th and 14th and Centuries', Journal of the Royal Asiatic Society, 2: pp. 129–138. doi:10.1017/S0035869X00136299
- 1981 [1979]. 'Muhammad bin Tughluq’s Last Years in Kathiavad and His Invasions of Thattha', in H. Khuhro (ed.), Sind Through the Centuries, Karachi: Oxford University Press, pp. 130–138.
- 1982b, c, d. 'Economic Conditions before 1200' doi:10.1017/CHOL9780521226929.004, 'The Currency System' and 'The Maritime Trade of India' doi:10.1017/CHOL9780521226929.009, in T. Raychaudhuri and I. Habib (eds), The Cambridge Economic History of India, Volume I: c. 1200–c. 1750, Cambridge: Cambridge University Press.
- 1983. 'Early Pilgrimages to the Graves of Mu‘īn al-Dīn and other Chishtī Shaikhs', in M. Israel and N. K. Wagle (eds), Islamic Society and Culture, New Delhi, pp. 95–100.
- 1984a. 'Qalandars and Related Groups: Elements of Social Deviance in the Religious Life of the Dehlī Sultanate of the Thirteenth and Fourteenth Centuries', in J. Friedmann (ed.), Islam in Asia, volume I, Jerusalem: Hebrew University of Jerusalem, pp. 60–108.
- 1984b. 'The Tuhfa-i nasa’ih of Yusuf Gada: An Ethical Treatise in Verse from the Late-Fourteenth Century Delhī Sultanate'. In Moral Conduct and Authority: The Place of Adab in South Asian Islam, ed. Barbara Daly Metcalf, Berkeley: University of California Press, pp. 91–123.
- 1985. 'When did the Sun Temple fall down?' (with J. C. Harle), South Asian Studies, 1: pp.1–7.
- 1986a. 'The Sufi Shaykh as a Source of Authority in Medieval India', Puruṣārtha 9: pp. 57–77.
- 1986b. 'Tabarrukat and Succession among the Great Chishti Shaykhs of the Delhi Sultanate', in Frykenberg (ed.), Delhi Through the Ages, New Delhi: Oxford University Press, pp. 62–103.
- 1989. 'An Eighteenth Century Narrative of a Journey from Bengal to England: Munshi Isma'il's New History', in C. Shackle, ed., Urdu and Muslim South Asia: Studies in Honour of Ralph Russell, London: SOAS, 49–66; Tārīkh-i jadīd : safarnāmah-i Munshī Ismā'īl bih Ingilistān (1185 HQ/1771 M): ... tarjumah khulāṣah-i Tārīkh-i jadīd bih zabān-i Ingilīsī, fihrist-i nushkhah'hā-yi khaṭṭī-i ganjīnah-i Sāymūn Digby bih zabān-i Ingilīsī va Fārsī (Persian translation), ed./tr. Najībah 'Ārif, Qum: Majma dhakhair Islami, 2021 ISBN 9786227435542.
- 1990a. 'The Naqshbandis in the Deccan in the Late Seventeenth and Early Eighteenth Century A.D.: Bābā Palangposh, Bābā Musāfir and Their Adherents', in M. Gaborieau, A. Popovic and T. Zarcone (eds), Naqshbandis: cheminements et situation actuelle d’un ordre mystique musulman, Istanbul: Isis, pp. 167–207.
- 1990b. 'The Sufi Shaykh and the Sultan: a Conflict of Claims to Authority in Medieval India', Iran 28: pp. 71–81.
- 1990c. 'Hawk and dove in Sufi combat', in C. Melville (ed.), Pembroke Papers 1; Persian and Islamic studies in honour of P. W. Avery, Cambridge, pp. 7–25.
- 1991. 'Flower-Teeth and the Bickford Censer: the identification of a Ninth-century Kashmiri Bronze', South Asian Studies 7: pp. 37–44.
- 1992. 'The Mother-of-pearl Overlaid Furniture of Gujarat: an Indian Handicraft of the 16th and 17th Centuries', in Skelton et al. (eds), Facets of Indian Art, London: Victoria and Albert Museum, pp. 213–222.
- 1993a. 'Some Asian Wanderers in Seventeenth-Century India', Studies in History 9, 2: pp. 247–264.
- 1993b. 'Miyān Mīr, Miyād̲j̲ī', Encyclopaedia of Islam, 2, vol. 7. doi:10.1163/1573-3912_islam_SIM_5242
- 1994a. 'Anecdotes of a provincial Sufi of the Delhi sultanate, Khwaja Gurg of Kara', Iran, 32: pp. 99–109.
- 1994b. 'To ride a Tiger or a Wall? Strategies of Prestige in Indian Sufi Legend', in Callewaert and Snell (eds), According to Tradition. Weisbaden: Harrassowitz, pp. 99–129.
- 1995. 'Illustrated Books of Omens from Gujarat or Rajasthan', in J. Guy (ed.), Indian Art and Conoisseurship: Essays in Honour of Douglas Barrett, Delhi: Indira Gandhi National Centre for the Arts, pp. 393–360.
- 1996. 'The Arab and Gulf Horse in Medieval India', in David Alexander (ed.), Furusiyya: the Horse in the Art of the Near East, Riyadh: The King Abdulaziz Public Library, pp. 162–167.
- 1997a. 'From Ladakh to Lahore in 1820–1821: the Account of a Kashmiri Traveller', Journal of Central Asian Studies, Srinagar, 8, 1: pp. 3–27.
- 1997b. 'Samrū', (with C. E. Bosworth) in Encyclopaedia of Islam, 2, Leiden: Brill. doi:10.1163/1573-3912_islam_SIM_6586
- 1998a. 'Tulsipur Fair, or the Boy Missionary: a Model for Kipling’s Kim', Indian International Centre Quarterly (Spring): pp. 106–125.
- 1998b. 'Before the Babas came to India : a Reconstruction of the Earlier Lives of Baba Sa’id Palangposh and Baba Musafir in "Wilayat"', Iran 36: pp. 139–164.
- 1998c. 'Travels in Ladakh 1820–21 : the Account of Moorcroft's Munshi, Hajji Sayyid Najaf ‘Ali, of his Travels', Asian Affairs 19, 3: pp. 299–311.
- 1999. 'Beyond the Ocean: Perceptions of Overseas in Indo-Persian Stories of the Mughal period', Studies in History, 15, 2: pp. 247–259.
- 2001b. 'The Indo-Persian Historiography of the Lodī Sultans', in F. Grimal (ed.), Les Sources et le temps, Pondicherry: École française d’Extrême Orient, pp. 243–261.
- 2003a. 'Two Captains of the Jawnpur Sultanate', in Jos Gommans and Om Prakash (eds), Circumambulations in South Asian History: Essays in Honour of Dirk H. A. Kolff, Leiden: Brill, pp. 159–178.
- 2003b. 'Le récit du Lieutenant Sterndale, retrouvé et transcrit par Simon Digby', Appendice 1, pp. 225–229; 'Sayyid Muhammad Mahdi's Visit to Chanderi, circa 1482', Appendice 6, pp. 263–265; 'La conquête de Chanderi par Babur: traduction d’un extrait du Ta’rīkh-i-Shāhī par Ahmad Yādgār', Appendice 8, pp. 273-275, in G. Fussman et al., Chanderi I: Naissance et déclin d’une qasba: Chanderi du Xe au XVIIIe siècle, Paris.
- 2004a. 'Before Timur came: the Provincialization of the Dehli Sultanate through the Fourteenth Century', Journal of the Economic and Social History of the Orient 47, 3: pp. 298–356.
- 2004b. 'The Hero and his Brother the Wonder-Horse: a Nepali/Celtic Parallel', in De l’Arabie à l’Himalaya: Chemins croisés en hommage à Marc Gaborieau, ed. Véronique Bouillier and Catherine Servan-Schreiber, Paris, pp. 105–121.
- 2004c. 'Travels with Robert', in Arts of Mughal India: Studies in honour of Robert Skelton, ed. R. Crill et al., London/Ahmadabad, pp. 14–19.
- 2004d. 'Bāyazīd Beg Turkmān's Pilgrimage to Makka: a Sixteenth Century Narrative', Iran, 42.
- 2006b. 'Ganj: the Game of treasure from Mughal India', South Asian Studies 22, 1: pp. 69–88.
- 2007a. 'Beatings and the sensation of release among the followers of Bābā Musāfir', Jerusalem Studies in Arabic and Islam, 33: pp. 487–494.
- 2007b. 'Export industries and handicraft production under the Sultans of Kashmir', The Indian Economic and Social History Review, 44, 4: pp. 407–423.
- 2007c. 'Between ancient and modern in Kashmir: The Rule and Role of Sultans and Sufis (1200/1300-1600)', in The Arts of Kashmir, ed. Pratapaditya Pal, New York, pp. 114–125.
- 2009. 'Kipling’s Indian Magic', Indian International Centre Quarterly, Summer: pp. 58–67.
- 2014. 'After Timur Left: North India in the Fifteenth Century', in After Timur Left: Culture and Circulation in Fifteenth Century North India, ed. Francesca Orsini and Samira Sheikh, New Delhi: Oxford University Press, pp. 47–59.

=== Book reviews ===
- 1963. S. C. Misra & M. L. Rahman, The Mirat-i-S̲ikandiri... of Shaikh Sikandar Ibn Muhammad ’urf Manjhu Ibn Akbar, in Journal of the Royal Asiatic Society of Great Britain and Ireland 1/2: pp. 106–107.
- 1967. S. A. A. Rizvi, Muslim Revivalist Movements in Northern India in the Sixteenth and Seventeenth Centuries, in Bulletin of the School of Oriental and African Studies 30, 1: pp. 206–207.
- 1967. M. R. Tarafdar, Ḥusain S̱ẖāhī Bengal, 1494-1538 A. D.: A Socio-Political Study, in Bulletin of the School of Oriental and African Studies 30, 3: pp. 713–715.
- 1967. S. M. I. al-Din, The "Tārīkh-i-Sher Shāhī" of 'Abbas K̲h̲ān Sarwānī, in Journal of the Royal Asiatic Society of Great Britain and Ireland 1/2: p. 46.
- 1967. R. Shyam, The Kingdom of Ahmadnagar, in Journal of the Royal Asiatic Society of Great Britain and Ireland 1/2: pp. 45–46.
- 1968. J. M. Banerjee, History of Firuz Shah Tughluq, in Bulletin of the School of Oriental and African Studies 31, 3: pp. 630–631.
- 1968. B. N. Goswamy and J. S. Grewal, The Mughals and the Jogis of Jakhbar, in Journal of the Royal Asiatic Society 3–4: pp. 195–197.
- 1969. S. Nilsson, European Architecture in India, 1750–1850, in Architectural Design 46, 2.
- 1969. H. K. Sherwani, Muḥammad-Qulī Quṭb Shāh, Founder of Haidarabad, in Bulletin of the School of Oriental and African Studies 32, 1: pp. 176–178.
- 1969. M. H. Case, South Asian History, 1750-1950: A Guide to Periodicals, Dissertations and Newspapers, in Bulletin of the School of Oriental and African Studies 32, 1: pp. 180–182.
- 1969. A. C. Roy, History of Bengal: Mughal Period (1526-1765 A. D.), in Bulletin of the School of Oriental and African Studies 32, 1: p. 229.
- 1969. M. A. Ali, The Mughal Nobility under Aurangzeb, in Journal of the Royal Asiatic Society of Great Britain and Ireland 1: pp. 91–93.
- 1969. G. N. Jalbani, Teachings of Shah Waliyullah of Delhi, in Journal of the Royal Asiatic Society of Great Britain and Ireland 1: p. 95.
- 1970. D. A. Low, J. C. Iltis, & M. D. Wainwright, Government Archives in South Asia: A Guide to National and State Archives in Ceylon, India and Pakistan, in Bulletin of the School of Oriental and African Studies 33, 2: pp. 418–419.
- 1970. R. K. Parmoo, A History of Muslim Rule in Kashmir, in Bulletin of the School of Oriental and African Studies 33, 3: pp. 648–650.
- 1970. A. M. Husain, Futūḥu’ssalāṯīn, or Shāh nāmah-i Hind of ’Iṣāmī. Vol. I., in Bulletin of the School of Oriental and African Studies 33, 3: pp. 651–654.
- 1970. H. K. Naqvi, Urban Centres and Industries in Upper India, 1556-1803, in Bulletin of the School of Oriental and African Studies 33, 3: pp. 654–656.
- 1970. Medieval India: A Miscellany. Vol. 1, in Bulletin of the School of Oriental and African Studies 33, 3: pp. 696–697.
- 1970. W. H. McLeod, Gurū Nānak and the Sikh religion, in Indian Economic and Social History Review 7, 2: pp. 301–313.
- 1971. J. N. Sarkar, The Military Despatches of a Seventeenth Century Indian General, in Journal of the Royal Asiatic Society of Great Britain and Ireland 2: pp. 200–201.
- 1971. S. B. P. Nigam, Nobility under the Sultans of Delhi, A. D. 1206-1398, in Bulletin of the School of Oriental and African Studies 34, 1: p. 168.
- 1971. G. Cannon, The Letters of Sir William Jones, in Bulletin of the School of Oriental and African Studies 34, 1: pp. 169–172.
- 1971. N. A. Siddiqi, Land Revenue Administration under the Mughals (1700-1750), in Bulletin of the School of Oriental and African Studies 34, 2: pp. 417–418.
- 1971. B. N. Goswamy & J. S. Grewal, The Mughal and Sikh Rulers and the Vaishnavas of Pindori: A Historical Interpretation of 52 Persian Documents, in Bulletin of the School of Oriental and African Studies 34, 2: pp. 418–420.
- 1971. E. Fischer and H. Shah, Rural Craftsmen and their Work: Equipment and Techniques in the Mor Village of Ratadi in Saurashtra, India, in Bulletin of the School of Oriental and African Studies 34, 2: p. 421.
- 1971. A. Ahmad & G. E. von Grunebaum, Muslim Self-Statement in India and Pakistan, 1857-1968, in Bulletin of the School of Oriental and African Studies 34, 3: pp. 618–620.
- 1971. T. Raychaudhuri, Bengal under Akbar and Jahangir: an Introductory Study in Social History, in The Indian Economic and Social History Review 8, 1: pp. 99-103. doi:10.1177/001946467100800106
- 1972. S. Crowe et al., The Gardens of Mughal India, in Architectural Design 43, 3: p. 6.
- 1972. H. L. Gottschalk, B. Spuler, & H. Kähler, Die Kultur des Islams, in Bulletin of the School of Oriental and African Studies 35, 1: p. 141.
- 1972. I. H. Siddiqui, History of Sher Shah Sur, in Bulletin of the School of Oriental and African Studies 35, 1: pp. 171–172.
- 1972. D. Forrest, Tiger of Mysore: The Life and Death of Tipu Sultan, in Bulletin of the School of Oriental and African Studies 35, 1: p. 174.
- 1972. M. A. Nayeem, The Philatelic and Postal History of Hyderabad. Vol. One. History of Postal Administration in Hyderabad, in Bulletin of the School of Oriental and African Studies 35, 1: pp. 203–204.
- 1972. A. Ahmad, An Intellectual History of Islam in India, in Journal of the Royal Asiatic Society of Great Britain and Ireland 2: pp. 157–159.
- 1972. R. Russell, K. Islam, Ghalib, 1797-1869. Vol. I: Life and Letters, in Bulletin of the School of Oriental and African Studies 35, 3: pp. 640–641.
- 1972. J. S. Grewal, Muslim Rule in India: The Assessments of British Historians, in Bulletin of the School of Oriental and African Studies 35, 3: pp. 643–644.
- 1972. W. H. Sleeman & P. D. Reeves, Sleeman in Oudh: An Abridgement of... A Journey through the Kingdom of Oude in 1849-50, in Bulletin of the School of Oriental and African Studies 35, 3: pp. 644–645.
- 1972. O. Aslanapa & A. Mill, Turkish Art and Architecture, in Bulletin of the School of Oriental and African Studies 35, 3: p. 688.
- 1972. G. L. Tikku, Persian Poetry in Kashmir 1339–1846: An Introduction, in Bulletin of the School of Oriental and African Studies 35, 3: p. 691.
- 1972. S. A. I. Tirmizi & Ghalib, Persian Letters of Ghalib, in Bulletin of the School of Oriental and African Studies 35, 3: pp. 691–692.
- 1972. A. M. Khan, The Transition in Bengal, 1756-1775: A Study of Saiyid Muhammad Reza Khan, in Journal of the Royal Asiatic Society of Great Britain and Ireland 2: pp. 159–160.
- 1973. K. M. Varma, The Indian Technique of Clay Modelling, in Bulletin of the School of Oriental and African Studies 36, 1.
- 1973. J. Spencer Trimingham, The Sufi Orders in Islam, in Bulletin of the School of Oriental and African Studies 36, 1: pp. 136–139.
- 1973. M. A. Haq, The Faith Movement of Mawlānā Muḥammad Ilyās, in Bulletin of the School of Oriental and African Studies 36, 1: pp. 169–170.
- 1973. S. H. Rashdi, M. Sabir, & B. Khan, Dīwān of Bayram Khan, in Bulletin of the School of Oriental and African Studies 36, 1: pp. 208–209.
- 1973. R. Russell & Ghālib, G̱ẖālib: The Poet and His Age. Papers Read at the Centenary Celebrations at the School of Oriental and African Studies, University of London, in Bulletin of the School of Oriental and African Studies 36, 1: p. 209.
- 1973. L. de Matos, R. Gulbenkian, J. Aubin, J. V. Serrão, & S. Biberfeld, Das Relaçoes entre Portugal e Persia: Exposiçao, in Bulletin of the School of Oriental and African Studies 36, 3: pp. 668–672.
- 1973. P. Pal, Aspects of Indian Art. Papers Presented in a Symposium at the Los Angeles County Museum of Art, October 1970, in Bulletin of the School of Oriental and African Studies 36, 3: pp. 686–689.
- 1973. J. S. Jha, Biography of an Indian Patriot: Maharaja Lakshmishwar Singh of Darbhanga, in Bulletin of the School of Oriental and African Studies 36, 3: pp. 690–692.
- 1973. S. J. Falk, Qajar Paintings, in Times Literary Supplement, 6 April: p. 374.
- 1973. S. C. Welch, A King's Book of Kings, in Times Literary Supplement, 4 May: p. 508.
- 1973. H. A. R. Gibb, The Travels of Ibn Battuta, A.D. 1325-1354. Vol. III, in Journal of the Royal Asiatic Society of Great Britain and Ireland 2: pp. 183–184.
- 1974. B. C. Olschak, Mystic Art of Ancient Tibet, in Times Literary Supplement, March.
- 1974. B. W. Robinson, Persian Paintings in the India Office Library, in Times Literary Supplement.
- 1974. John Irwin, The Kashmir Shawl, in South Asian Review, 8, 1: pp. 83–84.
- 1974. C. Batley, The Design Development of Indian Architecture, in Architectural Design 44, 4: p. 200.
- 1974. E. Ashtor, Les métaux précieux et la balance des payements du Proche-Orient à la basse époque, in Bulletin of the School of Oriental and African Studies 37, 2: pp. 468–469.
- 1974. D. J. Matthews & C. Shackle, An Anthology of Classical Urdu Love Lyrics, in Bulletin of the School of Oriental and African Studies 37, 2: pp. 476–479. doi:10.1017/S0041977X00136614
- 1974. A. Grohmann, Arabische Paläographie. II. Teil. Das Schriftwesen. Die Lapidarschrift, in Bulletin of the School of Oriental and African Studies 37, 2: p. 524. doi:10.1017/S0041977X00137036
- 1974. P. K. Hitti, Capital Cities of Arab Islam, in Bulletin of the School of Oriental and African Studies 37, 2: p. 527. doi:10.1017/S0041977X00137103
- 1974. M. H. Gopal, Tipu Sultan’s Mysore: An Economic Study, in Journal of the Royal Asiatic Society of Great Britain and Ireland 1: pp. 83–84.
- 1975. K. S. Lal, Growth of Muslim Population in Medieval India (A. D. 1000-1800), in Bulletin of the School of Oriental and African Studies 38, 1: pp. 176–177. doi:10.1017/S0041977X0004739X
- 1975. Y. Friedmann, Shaykh Aḥmad Sirhindī: An Outline of His Thought and a Study of His Image in the Eyes of Posterity, in Bulletin of the School of Oriental and African Studies 38, 1: 177–9. doi:10.1017/S0041977X00047406
- 1975. J. S. Grewal, From Guru Nanak to Maharaja Ranjit Singh: Essays in Sikh History, in Bulletin of the School of Oriental and African Studies 38, 1: pp. 179–180. doi:10.1017/S0041977X00047418
- 1975. N. Steensgaard, Carracks, Caravans and Companies: The Structural Crisis in the European-Asian Trade in the Early 17th Century, in Bulletin of the School of Oriental and African Studies 38, 1: pp. 198–200. doi:10.1017/S0041977X00047595
- 1975. S. A. A. Rizvi, Fathpur Sikri, in Bulletin of the School of Oriental and African Studies 38, 1: pp. 221–222. doi:10.1017/S0041977X00047893
- 1975. A. L. Srivastava, Akbar the Great. Vol. III. Society and Culture in 16th Century India, in Bulletin of the School of Oriental and African Studies 38, 2: p. 463. doi:10.1017/S0041977X00142843
- 1975. B. S. Singh, The Jammu Fox : a Biography of Maharaja Gulab Singh of Kashmir, 1792–1857, in Bulletin of the School of Oriental and African Studies 38, 2: pp. 463–464. doi:10.1017/S0041977X00142855
- 1975. K. Singh, The Relations of the House of Bikaner with the Central Powers, 1465-1949, in Bulletin of the School of Oriental and African Studies 38, 3: pp. 653–654. doi:10.1017/S0041977X00048382
- 1975. M. A. Nayeem, External Relations of the Bijapur Kingdom, 1489-1686 A. D. (A Study in Diplomatic History) & H. K. Sherwani, History of the Qut̤b Shāhī Dynasty, in Bulletin of the School of Oriental and African Studies 38, 3: pp. 654–656. doi:10.1017/S0041977X00048394
- 1975. P. Denwood, The Tibetan Carpet, in South Asian Review 8, 3: pp. 272–273.
- 1975. M. Bence-Jones, Palaces of the Raj: Magnificence and misery of the Lord Sahibs, in Journal of the Royal Asiatic Society of Great Britain and Ireland 107, 1: pp. 79–80. doi:10.1017/S0035869X00132599
- 1976. P. Hardy, The Muslims of British India, in Journal of the Royal Asiatic Society of Great Britain and Ireland 108, 1: pp. 83–84. doi:10.1017/S0035869X00133179
- 1976. Q. Ahmad, Corpus of Arabic and Persian Inscriptions of Bihar (A. H. 640-1200), in Bulletin of the School of Oriental and African Studies 39, 1: pp. 190–191. doi:10.1017/S0041977X0005240X
- 1976. G. Bouchon, Mamale de Cananor; un adversaire de l’Inde portugaise (1507-1528), in Bulletin of the School of Oriental and African Studies 39, 1: pp. 191–193. doi:10.1017/S0041977X00052411
- 1976. V. S. Bhatnagar, Life and Times of Sawai Jai Singh, 1688-1743, in Bulletin of the School of Oriental and African Studies 39, 1: pp. 193–195. doi:10.1017/S0041977X00052423
- 1976. J. M. S. Baljon, A Mystical Interpretation of Prophetic Tales by an Indian Muslim: Shāh Walī Allāh’s Ta’wīl al-aḥādīth, in Bulletin of the School of Oriental and African Studies 39, 1: p. 252. doi:10.1017/S0041977X00052976
- 1976. K. N. Chitins, Keḷadi polity, in Bulletin of the School of Oriental and African Studies 39, 1: pp. 252–253. doi:10.1017/S0041977X00052988
- 1976. V. K. Chavda, A Select Bibliography of Gujarat, Its History and Culture, 1600-1857, in Bulletin of the School of Oriental and African Studies 39, 1: p. 253. doi:10.1017/S0041977X0005299X
- 1976. M. Habib & K. A. Nizami, Politics and Society during the Early Medieval Period. Collected Works, Vol. 1, in Bulletin of the School of Oriental and African Studies 39, 2: pp. 453–458. doi:10.1017/S0041977X0005028X
- 1976. P. Pal, The Arts of Nepal. Part 1: Sculpture, in Bulletin of the School of Oriental and African Studies 39, 2: pp. 461–462. doi:10.1017/S0041977X00050321
- 1976. P. M. Joshi & M. A. Nayeem, Studies in the Foreign Relations of India (From the Earliest Times to 1947). Prof. H. K. Sherwani Felicitation Volume, in Bulletin of the School of Oriental and African Studies 39, 3: pp. 672–673. doi:10.1017/S0041977X0005134X
- 1976. K. Chattopadhyay, Handicrafts of India, in Bulletin of the School of Oriental and African Studies 39, 3: pp. 673–674. doi:10.1017/S0041977X00051351
- 1976. S. C. Misra & ’Abbās ’Ali, Qissa-i-ghamgin of Munshi ’Abbās ’Alī, in Bulletin of the School of Oriental and African Studies 39, 3: pp. 716–717. doi:10.1017/S0041977X00051843
- 1976. G. R. Kuppuswamy, Economic Conditions in Karnāṭaka (A.D. 973-A.D. 1336), in Bulletin of the School of Oriental and African Studies 39, 3: p. 718. doi:10.1017/S0041977X00051880
- 1976. M. K. Dhavalikar, Ajanta: A Cultural Study, in Bulletin of the School of Oriental and African Studies 39, 3: p. 718. doi:10.1017/S0041977X00051879
- 1976. A. Farrington, Sir William Foster, 1863-1951: A Bibliography, in Journal of the Royal Asiatic Society of Great Britain and Ireland 108, 1: p. 83. doi:10.1017/S0035869X00133167
- 1976. A. Duarte & S. Khan, The Beggar Saint of Sehwan and Other Sketches of Sind, in Journal of the Royal Asiatic Society of Great Britain and Ireland 108, 2: p. 169. doi:10.1017/S0035869X00133532
- 1976. W. J. Fischel, ed., Unknown Jews in Unknown Lands, the Travels of Rabbi David D’Beth Hillel (1824-1832), in The Indian Economic & Social History Review 13, 3: pp. 409-411. doi:10.1177/001946467601300309
- 1977. P. Pal, Nepal: Where the Gods Are Young, in Bulletin of the School of Oriental and African Studies 40, 1: pp. 179–180. doi:10.1017/S0041977X00040854
- 1977. A. Farrington, The Records of the East India College, Haileybury, and Other Institutions: IOR J-K, in Bulletin of the School of Oriental and African Studies 40, 1: pp. 180–181. doi:10.1017/S0041977X00040866
- 1977. B. N. S. Yadava, Society and Culture in Northern India in the Twelfth Century, in Bulletin of the School of Oriental and African Studies 40, 1: p. 221. doi:10.1017/S0041977X00041343
- 1977. D. K. Ghose, Kashmir in Transition, 1885-1893, in Bulletin of the School of Oriental and African Studies 40, 1: pp. 222–223. doi:10.1017/S0041977X00041380
- 1977. S. Gopal, Commerce and Crafts in Gujarat, 16th and 17th Centuries: A Study in the Impact of European Expansion on Precapitalist Economy & M. N. Pearson, Merchants and Rulers in Gujarat: The Response to the Portuguese in the Sixteenth Century, in Bulletin of the School of Oriental and African Studies 40, 2: pp. 408–409. doi:10.1017/S0041977X00044402
- 1978. C. Worswick, A. Embree, & The Earl Mountbatten of Burma, The Last Empire: Photography in British India, 1855-1911, in Journal of the Royal Asiatic Society of Great Britain and Ireland 110, 1: pp. 94–95. doi:10.1017/S0035869X00134410
- 1979. H. Furber, Rival Empires of Trade in the Orient, 1600-1800, in Bulletin of the School of Oriental and African Studies 42, 1: p. 198. doi:10.1017/S0041977X00109279
- 1979. T. Wilkinson & B. Smith, Two Monsoons, in Journal of the Royal Asiatic Society of Great Britain and Ireland 111, 2: pp. 174–175. doi:10.1017/S0035869X00135683
- 1980. I. H. Qureshi, Akbar: The Architect of the Mughul Empire, in Bulletin of the School of Oriental and African Studies 43, 3: pp. 609–610. doi:10.1017/S0041977X00137723
- 1980. P. Pal, The Arts of Nepal. Part 2: Painting, in Bulletin of the School of Oriental and African Studies 43, 3: pp. 613–614. doi:10.1017/S0041977X00137760
- 1980. P. Nihalani, R. K. Tongue, & R. Hosali, Indian and British English: A Handbook of Usage and Pronunciation, in Journal of the Royal Asiatic Society of Great Britain and Ireland 1: pp. 105–106. doi:10.1017/S0035869X00136123
- 1981. H. Lawrence, J. Lawrence, & A. Woodiwiss, The Journals of Honoria Lawrence: India Observed 1837-1854, in Journal of the Royal Asiatic Society of Great Britain and Ireland 113, 1: pp. 102–103. doi:10.1017/S0035869X00137190
- 1982. R. Islam (ed.), The Baḥr ul-asrār, travelogue of South Asia. By Maḥmūd B. Amī Walī Balkhī, in Journal of the Royal Asiatic Society, 114, 1: pp. 79–81. doi:10.1017/S0035869X00158927
- 1982. R. Islam, A Calendar of Documents on Indo-Persian Relations, (1500-1750). Vol. I, in Bulletin of the School of Oriental and African Studies 45, 3: p. 593. doi:10.1017/S0041977X00041756
- 1982. M. Salīmullāh & S. M. Imamuddin, The Ta’rīkh-i-Bangālah, in Journal of the Royal Asiatic Society of Great Britain and Ireland 114, 1: p. 81. doi:10.1017/S0035869X00158939
- 1983. M. Lath, The Ardhakathānaka, Half a Tale: A Study in the Interrelationship between Autobiography and History, in Journal of the Royal Asiatic Society, 115, 1: pp. 129–130. doi:10.1017/S0035869X00160393
- 1983. S. F. Dale, Islamic Society on the South Asian Frontier: The Māppiḷas of Malabar, 1498-1922, in Journal of the Royal Asiatic Society of Great Britain and Ireland 115, 2: pp. 324–325. doi:10.1017/S0035869X0013789X
- 1983. M. A. Nayeem, Mughal Documents: Catalogue of Aurangzeb’s Reign. Vol. I (A. D. 1658-1663), Part 1, in Bulletin of the School of Oriental and African Studies 46, 3: pp. 568–569. doi:10.1017/S0041977X00043482
- 1983. C. Skinner, Ahmad Rijaluddin’s Hikayat Perintah Negeri Benggala, in Journal of the Royal Asiatic Society of Great Britain and Ireland 2: p. 326. doi:10.1017/S0035869X00137918
- 1984. A. S. Melikian-Chirvani, Islamic Metalwork from the Iranian World: 8th-18th Centuries, in Bulletin of the School of Oriental and African Studies 47, 3: pp. 567–569. doi:10.1017/S0041977X00113941
- 1985. I. Habib, An Atlas of the Mughal Empire: Political and Economic Maps with Detailed Notes, Bibliography and Index, in Bulletin of the School of Oriental and African Studies 48, 1: pp. 156–158. doi:10.1017/S0041977X00027385
- 1985. R. C. Marin, Islam in Local Contexts, in Journal of the Royal Asiatic Society of Great Britain and Ireland 1: pp. 85–86. doi:10.1017/S0035869X0015511X
- 1985. M. Jenkins, Islamic Art in the Kuwait National Museum: The al-Sabah Collection, in Journal of the Royal Asiatic Society of Great Britain and Ireland 1: pp. 89–90. doi:10.1017/S0035869X00155157
- 1985. A. Subhan, The Tā’rīkh-i-Bangāla-i-Mahābatjangī (An Eyewitness Account of Nawāb ’Alīvardī Khān of Bengal and His Times) of Yūsuf ’Alī Khān, in Journal of the Royal Asiatic Society of Great Britain and Ireland 1: p. 99. doi:10.1017/S0035869X00155248
- 1986. M. Brand & G. D. Lowry, Akbar’s India: Art from the Mughal City of Victory, in Journal of the Royal Asiatic Society of Great Britain and Ireland 2: pp. 294–296. doi:10.1017/S0035869X00140201
- 1997. C. Chavda, The End of a Trail: The Cheetah in India, in Studies in History 13, 1: pp. 157-159. doi:10.1177/025764309701300107
- 1999. 'Corners of Mughal History; Reviewed Work: The Mughal State, 1526-1750 by Muzaffar Alam, Sanjay Subrahmanyam', in Economic and Political Weekly 34, 18 (1–7 May): p. 1028.
- 2009. F.B. Flood, Objects of Translation: Material culture and medieval "Hindu-Muslim" encounter, in The Art Newspaper, 1 October.

=== Miscellaneous ===
- 1958. 'Saki Nama: A Poem by Hafiz translated into English by Simon Digby', Thought, New Delhi 27 December: 13.
- 1970. 'Art and the East India Trade: Notice of an Exhibition at the Victoria and Albert Museum', in The Burlington Magazine 112, 813 (December): 840-841.
- 1975. 'Chic of Araby' (A Review of the Festival of Islam in London 1975), New Statesman, London, 16 April: 515–6.
- 1982. 'Indian Summer: a Review of some Exhibitions held as Part of the Festival of India', The Oxford Art Journal, 5 January: 68–70.
- 1992. 'Preface', in Bruce B. Lawrence, Morals for the Heart, New York: Paulist Press, 1–2.
- 1992. Djanali Akberov; Trio Khan Shushinski. Anthologie du Mugam d'Azerbaidjan, vol. 7. Maison des Cultures du Monde, Inedit W260069. One compact disc. Photos, notations, notes in French by Pierre Bois with English translation by Josephine de Linde and Simon Digby and translation of Azerbaijani lyrics by Dilara Talychinskaia.
- 2002. John Gornall, 1932–2002: Bibliography with a Memoir by Simon Digby, Jersey: Orient Monographs.
- 2004. Obituary of James Coffin Harle, The Independent, London, August.
- 2007. 'The Turani Takya in the Deccan: Patrons, Clients and Services', Conference on Patronage in Mughal India, Universités de Paris, 2001: Proceedings, ed. Nalini Delvoye, May 2007.
- The Emperor Akbar's Atelier, Times Literary Supplement, 527.
