= 1874–75 FA Cup =

1874–75 FA Cup (4th edition)
Tournament details
- Country: England
- Dates: 10 October 1874; 16 March 1875
- Teams: 29

Final positions
- Champions: Royal Engineers A.F.C. (1st title)
- Runners-up: Old Etonians A.F.C.
- Semifinalists: Shropshire Wanderers F.C.; Oxford University A.F.C.

Tournament statistics
- Matches played: 32
- Goals scored: 90 (2.81 per match)
- Top goal scorer(s): Robert Kingsford, Charles Alcock & Charles Wollaston (Wanderers F.C.) (5 goals)

The 1874–75 FA Cup was the fourth edition of the annual FA Cup, the oldest national football tournament in the world. Entrants increased to 29 teams, one more than the previous season; four would never contest a match. It began on 27 February 1875 and ended at Final Replay on 16 March 1875.

Semi-final and final winning results were partly determined through replays. Oxford University unsuccessfully defended its FA Cup in a rematch with their previous season's contestants against the Royal Engineers, 1–0 in the Semi-final on 27 February 1875 in Kennington Oval, London.

Royal Engineers in their third successive final successfully were interrupted by the 13 March 1875 Final match against Old Etonians at Kennington Oval in London, 1–1 draw. 2,000 attended. They would continue the pursuit of their first Cup title at the Final Replay on 16 March 1875 in Kennington Oval, London against Old Etonians, 2–0. 3,000 attended.

The widest win score of the tournament was recorded by two-time FA Cup winners Wanderers, who defeated Farningham 16–0 in the First Round.

Final The 1875 FA Cup Final on 13 March 1875 Royal Engineers and Old Etonians at Kennington Oval in London. 1–1 draw; there would be a replay. 2,000 attended.

== Format ==
First Round: 28 teams (with Reigate Priory F.C. getting a bye) faced another team.
Second Round: 14 First Round teams and Reigate Priory played an opponent, with Old Etonians getting a bye.
Third Round: The remaining teams played in a knockout-round style, due to the teams being a power of two.
Final: Old Etonians lost in a replay to Royal Engineers

== Calendar ==
Round	Date	Fixtures					Clubs	New entries this round
Round	Date	Original	Plays	Replays	Walkovers	Byes	Clubs	New entries this round
First round	10 October - 28 November 1874	14	11	5	3	1	29 → 14	29
Second round	14 November - 5 December 1874	7	6	0	1	1	14 → 8	none
Quarter-finals	23 January - 6 February 1875	4	4	1	0	0	8 → 4	none
Semi-finals	27 February - 5 March 1875	2	2	1	0	0	4 → 2	none
Final	13 - 16 March 1875	1	1	1	0	0	2 → 1	none

== First round ==
All 29 teams entered the competition at the First Round stage. Reigate Priory were given a bye to the Second Round due to the odd number of entrants. Three teams – Civil Service, Windsor Home Park and Shropshire Wanderers – were awarded walkovers. Three of the ties finished as draws and went to replays; of these, one had to be decided by a second replay. The widest score difference in the competition came at this stage with the Wanderers 16–0 win over Farningham.

10 October 1874	South Norwood F.C.	1–3	Pilgrims F.C.	near Portland Road, South Norwood, London
	Unknow		Arthur Good; Unknow	Attendance: 700

24 October 1874	Upton Park F.C.	0–3	Barnes F.C.	West Ham Park, West Ham, London
			H.A. Hudson; Charles Morice; Alfred Soden	Attendance: 1500

31 October 1874	Woodford Wells F.C.	1–0	High Wycombe F.C.	Mr. Buxton's field, Monkhams Lane, Woodford
	W. Spreckley			Attendance: 600

31 October 1874	Wanderers F.C.	16–0	Farningham F.C.	The Oval, Kennington, London
	Robert Kingsford; Charles Wollaston; Charles Chenery; Charles Alcock; Hubert Heron; Jarvis Kenrick			Attendance: 1925

31 October 1874	Oxford University A.F.C.	6–0	Brondesbury F.C.	The Parks, Oxford
	Edward Parry; Thomas Hughes; Charles Cripps			Attendance: 1163

5 November 1874	Old Etonians A.F.C.	0–0	Swifts F.C.	The Meadows, Eton
				Attendance: 700

7 November 1874	Royal Engineers A.F.C.	3–0	Great Marlow F.C.	Chatham Lines, Chatham
	Pelham von Donop; Unknow			Attendance: 2376

7 November 1874	Clapham Rovers F.C.	3–0	Panthers F.C.	Greyhound Lane, Clapham, London
	Unknow			Attendance: 2848

14 November 1874	Cambridge University A.F.C.	0–0	Crystal Palace F.C.	Parker's Piece, Cambridge
				Attendance: 500

14 November 1874	Southall F.C.	0–0	Leyton F.C.
				Attendance: ¿650?

14 November 1874	Hitchin F.C.	0–1	Maidenhead F.C.	Top Field, Hitchin
			James Nicholls	Attendance: 750

Windsor Home Park F.C.	w/o from	Uxbridge F.C.

Shropshire Wanderers F.C.	w/o from	Sheffield F.C.

Civil Service F.C.	w/o from	Harrow Chequers F.C.

Reigate Priory F.C.	bye

=== Replays ===
14 November 1874	Swifts F.C.	1–1	Old Etonians A.F.C.	Dolphin Ground, Slough
	William Joll		Alexander Bonsor	Attendance: 750

21 November 1874	Crystal Palace F.C.	1–2	Cambridge University A.F.C.	Crystal Palace Park, London
	A. Fleet		George Simpson; Unknow	Attendance: 500

26 November 1874	Old Etonians A.F.C.	3–0	Swifts F.C.	The Meadows, Eton
	Unknow			Attendance: 700

28 November 1874	Leyton F.C.	0–5	Southall F.C.	Provisional ground at Church Road, Leyton
			Unknow	Attendance: 500

== Second round ==
The 15 teams that progressed from the First Round took part in the Second Round.Old Etonians were given a bye to the Third Round due to the odd number of teams. Oxford University were awarded a walkover in their tie against Windsor Home Park. In all but one of the fixtures, the losing teams failed to score. Two matches saw the biggest win of the round: both Royal Engineers and Wanderers beat their respective opponents 5–0. The Civil Service scratched from its replay against the Shropshire Wanderers as its members could not, or would not, travel to Shrewsbury for the replay.

14 November 1874	Shropshire Wanderers F.C.	1–0	Civil Service F.C.	Racecourse Ground, Monkmoor, Shrewsbury
	John Edwards			Attendance: 700

21 November 1874	Wanderers F.C.	5–0	Barnes F.C.	The Oval, Kennington, London
	Charles Alcock; Charles Wollaston; Jarvis Kenrick			Attendance: 2000; Referee: Alfred Stair

5 December 1874	Woodford Wells F.C.	3–0	Southall F.C.	Mr. Buxton's field, Monkhams Lane, Woodford
	Wild; Bouch			Attendance: 600

5 December 1874	Clapham Rovers F.C.	2–0	Pilgrims F.C.	Clapham Common, Clapham, London
	Herbert Bevington; Edgar Field			Attendance: 2000

5 December 1874	Maidenhead F.C.	2–1	Reigate Priory F.C.	York Road, Maidenhead
	Burnham		W. Laker	Attendance: 1377

5 December 1874	Royal Engineers A.F.C.	5–0	Cambridge University A.F.C.	The Oval, Kennington, London
	Mulholland; Herbert Rawson; William Stafford; Unknow			Attendance: 2500

Oxford University A.F.C.	w/o from	Windsor Home Park F.C.

Old Etonians A.F.C.	bye

== Quarter-finals ==
The eight teams that progressed from the Second Round took part in the Third Round. There was no need for any team to be given a bye to the next round, and there were no walkovers. Only one tie required a replay, in which Shropshire Wanderers recorded the biggest win of the round: a 2–0 win over Woodford Wells.

23 January 1875	Old Etonians A.F.C.	1–0	Maidenhead F.C.	The Oval, Kennington, London
	Unknow			Attendance: 700

23 January 1875	Shropshire Wanderers F.C.	1–1	Woodford Wells F.C.	Racecourse Ground, Monkmoor, Shrewsbury
	Fletcher		Powell	Attendance: 700

30 January 1875	Wanderers F.C.	1–2	Oxford University F.C.	The Oval, Kennington, London
	William Rawson (o.g.)		Henry Otter; Francis Simpson	Attendance: 2000; Referee: James Kirkpatrick

30 January 1875	Royal Engineers A.F.C.	3–2	Clapham Rovers F.C.	Chatham Lines, Chatham
	Alexander Mein; William Stafford; Unknow		Herbert Bevington; Unknow	Attendance: 2500

=== Replay ===
6 February 1875	Woodford Wells F.C.	0–2	Shropshire Wanderers F.C.	Mr. Buxton's field, Monkhams Lane, Woodford
			John Edwards; D.W. Christie	Attendance: 600

== Semi-finals ==
The four winning teams from the Third Round took part in the Semi-finals. Old Etonians beat Shropshire Wanderers at the first attempt, but Royal Engineers required a replay to beat Oxford University after a 1–1 draw; they won the replay 1–0. All three matches were played at Kennington Oval, London.

27 February 1875	Old Etonians A.F.C.	1–0	Shropshire Wanderers F.C.	The Oval, Kennington, London
	Alexander Bonsor			Attendance: 700

27 February 1875	Royal Engineers A.F.C.	1–1	Oxford University A.F.C.	The Oval, Kennington, London
	Henry Renny-Tailyour		John Bain	Attendance: 2500

=== Replay ===
5 March 1875	Royal Engineers A.F.C.	1–0	Oxford University A.F.C.	The Oval, Kennington, London
	Henry Renny-Tailyour			Attendance: 2500

== Final ==
The 1875 FA Cup Final was played on 13 March 1875 between Royal Engineers and Old Etonians at Kennington Oval in London. The match was refereed by cup founder Charles Alcock of Wanderers F.C. It finished as a 1–1 draw, with goals from Henry Renny-Tailyour for Royal Engineers and Alexander Bonsor for Old Etonians, which meant that there would have to be a replay.

13 March 1875

Royal Engineers A.F.C.	1–1	Old Etonians A.F.C.
Henry Renny-Tailyour 40'	Report	Alexander Bonsor 30'

The Oval, Kennington, London
Attendance: 2000
Referee: Charlie Alcock (Wanderers F.C.)

=== Replay ===
The replay was played three days later, also at Kennington Oval and refereed by C. W. Alcock. Two goals from Henry Renny-Tailyour and William Stafford gave Royal Engineers a 2–0 win and their first FA Cup title in three attempts.

16 March 1875

Royal Engineers A.F.C.	2–0	Old Etonians A.F.C.
Henry Renny-Tailyour 30'; William Stafford 60'	Report

The Oval, Kennington, London
Attendance: 3000
Referee: Charlie Alcock (Wanderers F.C.)

== See also ==
- FA Cup
- FA Cup Final
