= 1876–77 FA Cup =

1876–77 FA Cup (6th edition)
Tournament details
- Country: England
- Dates: 14 October 1876; 24 March 1877
- Teams: 37

Final positions
- Champions: Wanderers F.C. (4th title)
- Runners-up: Oxford University A.F.C.
- Semifinalists: Cambridge University A.F.C.

Tournament statistics
- Matches played: 30
- Goals scored: 95 (3.17 per match)
- Top goal scorer(s): John Owen (Sheffield F.C.) (5 goals)

The 1876–77 Football Association Challenge Cup was the sixth edition of the annual FA Cup, the oldest national football tournament in the world. Entrants increased to 37 teams, 5 more than the previous season; 8 would never contest a match. It began on 14 October 1876 and ended at the final on 24 March 1877

Wanderers successfully defended its third FA Cup in the Final on 24 March 1877 in Kennington Oval defeating Oxford University, 2–1 (a.e.t.). 3,000 attended.

== Format ==
First round: 36 teams (Queen's Park getting a bye) played.
Second round: 18 teams (with Queen's Park still having a bye) played.
Third round: 10 remaining teams played a game.
Fourth Round: 4 teams, with Wanderers getting a bye played for a spot in the semi-finals.
Semi-finals: 2 of the 3 remaining teams would play for a chance to play Oxford University (after getting a bye) in the final.
Final: Oxford University faced the semi-final for the chance to win their second FA Cup.

== Calendar ==
Round	Date	Fixtures					Clubs	New entries this round
Round	Date	Original	Plays	Replays	Walkovers	Byes	Clubs	New entries this round
First round	14 October - 11 November 1876	18	11	0	7	1	37 → 19	36
Second round	29 November - 16 December 1876	9	9	0	0	1	19 → 10	none
Third round	20 January - 3 February 1877	5	4	1	1	0	10 → 5	1
Fourth round	17 February - 10 March 1877	2	2	1	1	0	5 → 3	none
Semi-finals	20 March 1877	1	1	0	1	0	3 → 2	none
Final	24 March 1877	1	1	0	0	0	2 → 1	none

== First round ==
14 October 1876	Pilgrims F.C.	4–1	Ramblers F.C.	Lordship Lane, Tottenham, London
	Detmar; Elmslie; Thomas Letchford; Lloyd		Sang	Attendance: 700; Referee: Charles Alcock

28 October 1876	Upton Park F.C.	7–0	Leyton F.C.	West Ham Park, West Ham, London
	Segar Bastard; W. Spreckley; Wild; Unknown			Attendance: 1357; Referee: Sydney Wright (Great Marlow F.C.)

4 November 1876	Forest School F.C.	4–1	Gresham F.C.	The Common, Walthamstow, London
	Crawley; Fairclough; Knowles		Unknown	Attendance: 500

4 November 1876	Great Marlow F.C.	2–1	Hertfordshire Rangers F.C.	Aldermeadow, Marlow
	Unknown		Unknown	Attendance: 700

4 November 1876	Rochester F.C.	5–0	Highbury Union F.C.	Borstal Road, Rochester
	G. Blackett; Gramshaw; Praul; Ramage; Unknown			Attendance: 706

4 November 1876	Royal Engineers A.F.C.	2–1	Old Harrovians A.F.C.	Chatham Lines, Chatham
	Herbert Rawson; Unknown		Hubert Longman	Attendance: 2279

4 November 1876	South Norwood F.C.	4–1	Saxons F.C.	Cricket Ground, South Norwood, London
	Ram; White		Sharpe	Attendance: 800

4 November 1876	Swifts F.C.	2–0	Reading Hornets F.C.	Dolphin Ground, Slough
	William Joll; William Rawson			Attendance: 948

8 November 1876	Panthers F.C.	3–0	Wood Grange F.C.	Upton Park, London
16:00	E. Farquharson; Unknown			Attendance: 500

11 November 1876	105th Regiment F.C.	3–0	1st Surrey Rifles F.C.	Regimental Barracks, Colchester
	Morris; Ford; Unknown			Attendance: 500

11 November 1876	Clapham Rovers F.C.	5–0	Reigate Priory F.C.	Wandsworth Common, Wandsworth, London
	Louis Birkett; Walter Buchanan; Arthur Cazenove; Edward Hunter; E.H. Taylor			Attendance: 2830

Barnes F.C.	w/o from	Old Etonians A.F.C.

Cambridge University A.F.C.	w/o from	High Wycombe F.C.

Oxford University A.F.C.	w/o from	Old Salopians F.C.

Sheffield F.C.	w/o from	Trojans F.C.

Shropshire Wanderers F.C.	w/o from	Druids F.C.

Southall F.C.	w/o from	Old Wykehamists A.F.C.

Wanderers F.C.	w/o from	Saffron Walden Town F.C.

Queen's Park F.C.	bye

== Second round ==
29 November 1876	Great Marlow F.C.	1–0	Forest School F.C.	Aldermeadow, Marlow
	Cox			Attendance: 1045

2 December 1876	South Norwood F.C.	0–7	Sheffield F.C.	The Oval, Kennington, London
			John Owen; Arthur Cursham; Matthews	Attendance: c. 800 (est.)

9 December 1876	Panthers F.C.	0–1	Pilgrims F.C.	Lordship Lane, Tottenham, London
			Baker	Attendance: 700

9 December 1876	Royal Engineers A.F.C.	3–0	Shropshire Wanderers F.C.	Chatham Lines, Chatham
	Robert Hedley; Unknown			Attendance: 2112

9 December 1876	Barnes F.C.	0–1	Upton Park F.C.	Barnes Common, Barnes, London
			Unknown	Attendance: 1500

14 December 1876	Oxford University A.F.C.	6–1	105th Regiment F.C.	The Parks, Oxford
	Arnold Hills; Charles Vidal; John Bain; Arthur Todd		Unknown	Attendance: 1204

16 December 1876	Cambridge University A.F.C.	2–1	Clapham Rovers F.C.	Parker's Piece, Cambridge
	John Hughes; Unknown		Norman Fox	Attendance: 1200

16 December 1876	Rochester F.C.	1–0	Swifts F.C.	Borstal Road , Rochester
	J. Blackett			Attendance: 750

16 December 1876	Southall F.C.	0–6	Wanderers F.C.	The Oval, Kennington, London
			Unknown	Attendance: 3721

Queen's Park F.C.	bye

== Third round ==
20 January 1877	Royal Engineers A.F.C.	1–0	Sheffield F.C.	The Oval, Kennington, London
	Herbert Rawson			Attendance: 2383

20 January 1877	Wanderers F.C.	3–0	Pilgrims F.C.	The Oval, Kennington, London
	Frederick Maddison; Charles Wollaston; Unknown			Attendance: 4000

24 January 1877	Upton Park F.C.	2–2	Great Marlow F.C.	The Oval, Kennington, London
	Segar Bastard; Archibald Winterbottom		Price; Vardy	Attendance: 1500

3 February 1877	Cambridge University A.F.C.	4–0	Rochester F.C.	Parker's Piece, Cambridge
	John Hughes; Prior; Widnell			Attendance: 1189

Oxford University A.F.C.	w/o from	Queen's Park F.C.

=== Replay ===
27 January 1877	Great Marlow F.C.	0–1	Upton Park F.C.	Unknown (Note: Historical databases vary on the home/away status of the clubs for this replay, and contemporary sources do not record the exact venue, match officials.)
			Unknown	Attendance: 1500

== Fourth round ==
17 February 1877	Cambridge University A.F.C.	1–0	Royal Engineers A.F.C.	The Oval, Kennington, London
	Hargreaves			Attendance: 1200

24 February 1877	Oxford University A.F.C.	0–0	Upton Park F.C.	The Parks, Oxford
				Attendance: 1500

Wanderers F.C.	bye

=== Replay ===
10 March 1877	Upton Park F.C.	0–1	Oxford University A.F.C.	The Oval, Kennington, London
			John Bain	Attendance: 1500

== Semi-finals ==
20 March 1877	Wanderers F.C.	1–0	Cambridge University A.F.C.	The Oval, Kennington, London
	Hubert Heron			Attendance: 1877

Oxford University A.F.C.	bye

== Final ==
24 March 1877

Wanderers F.C.	2–1 (a.e.t.)	Oxford University A.F.C.
William Lindsay 86'; Jarvis Kenrick 97'		Arthur Kinnaird 15' (o.g.)

The Oval, Kennington, London
Attendance: 3000
Referee: Sidney Wright (Great Marlow F.C.)

== See also ==
- FA Cup
- FA Cup Final
