= Philip Hosken Fernandez =

English footballer (1854–1932)

Personal information
- Full name: Philip Hosken Fernandez
- Date of birth: 1854
- Place of birth: Madras, British India
- Date of death: 13 August 1932 (aged 77–78)
- Place of death: Monkton Combe, Somerset
- Position: Right wing

Senior career*
Years	Team	Apps	(Gls)
1874–77	Oxford University		
- * Club domestic league appearances and goals

The Rev. Philip Fernandez was a footballer who played in the 1877 FA Cup final for Oxford University.

== Early life ==
Fernandez was the eldest son of Thomas Francis of Madras, where he was born in 1854; by 1861 the family was back in England. He was educated at Westminster School, which was an early adopter of association laws. He represented the school at the Winchester code of football against London Wykehmanists, and College against the Commoners in the "fifteens", in 1871. He also represented the college at cricket.

In 1873, he went up to Trinity College, Oxford; he took his Bachelor of Arts in 1877 and his Master of Arts in 1880.

== Football career ==
Fernandez first appeared for the Oxford University A.F.C. in February 1874, in a 2–1 win over a Gitanos side featuring many Wanderers players. He was not a regular University player, making his first competitive appearance in a 2–1 win in the 1874–75 FA Cup third round win over the Wanderers. He kept his place for the ties against the Royal Engineers at the semi-final stage, playing as a right-side forward.

His only appearance in the 1875–76 FA Cup was in the surprise fourth round defeat to the Old Etonians, although he did appear in the Varsity match for the only time that season; despite Oxford being down to 10 men through injury for much of the match, the Dark Blues beat Cambridge University 4–1. Fernandez clinched the victory with the fourth goal ten minutes from time, "mugging" the Cambridge backs, who had paused, assuming there would be a claim for hand-ball made against them.

In the 1876–77 season, he only played twice, both times in the 1876–77 FA Cup; the first time in the replay win over Upton Park at the Kennington Oval in the last 5 stage, and the second time in the final defeat to the Wanderers, again on the right, with captain Edward Parry. His graduation made him ineligible for the university side afterwards, and there is no record of him playing football again at any reportable level.

== Post-university ==
In 1882 he became the assistant-master of Uppingham School. In 1886 he was ordained as a Church of England vicar, and was first sent to South Africa, where until 1897 he held curacies in Maritzburg and Natal. From 1912 to 1918 he was the vicar of Hewelsfield in the diocese of Gloucester, and from 1918 to 1926 of Dewsall in the diocese of Hereford. From 1927 to 1932, he lived in Monkton Combe, in Somerset, where he died of pneumonia following a bout of sunstroke. He left a widow, Annie (née Leighton), whom he married in Hewesfield in 1913.
