= Edward Alington =

English footballer (1850–1938)

Personal information
- Full name: Edward Hugh Alington
- Date of birth: 9 April 1857
- Place of birth: Candlesby, Lincolnshire, England
- Date of death: 11 September 1938 (aged 81)
- Place of death: Oxford, England
- Position: Utility player

Senior career*
Years	Team	Apps	(Gls)
1872–75	Westminster School		
1875–76	Wanderers		
1876–78	Oxford University		
- * Club domestic league appearances and goals

The Rev. Edward Hugh Alington (9 April 1857 – 11 September 1938) was an English footballer and Church of England vicar, who played in the 1877 FA Cup final for Oxford University.

== Early life ==
Alington was the 8th son of John Alington of Candlesby, Lincolnshire. He was educated at Westminster School, an early adopter of association laws.

== Football career ==
Alington featured for the school against the Gitanos in October 1872. At this stage of his career he played as a forward, and received praise for his performance for the school against the Wanderers the following month. He was considered a "good dribbler" but "very slow".

Perhaps taking this constructive criticism on board, he retreated to half-back for the 1873–74 season (at a time when teams were playing formations akin to 2–2–6), and scored his first recorded goals for the school in a 2–1 win against the Civil Service in February 1874.

In 1875–76, he took over the captaincy of the school side, and was honoured by being chosen to play for the Wanderers in November; he played as a forward in a 7–0 win over Cricklewood.

In 1876, he went up to Hertford College, Oxford, gaining a second class in Honour Moderations in 1878 and took his Bachelor of Arts in 1880. With such footballing experience, he quickly found a place in the university side, making his debut for the Dark Blues in a 1–0 win over the Wanderers in the Parks in November, playing up front.

He swapped between the university and the Wanderers almost randomly during the season. On 13 December for instance he played for Wanderers against the university at the Kennington Oval, and the very next day for the university in the 1875–76 FA Cup against the 105th Regiment at the same venue. While he was a forward for Wanderers, he played in goal for the university, and had an early lesson in the position when he was charged between the posts by a horde of soldiers in the Cup tie; it was the only goal he conceded as the university won 6–1.

Alington played in goal in four Cup ties that season, culminating in the Cup Final, against the Wanderers, but he finished on the losing side. He was however on the winning side in the Varsity Match in February 1877, keeping a clean sheet in Oxford's 1–0 win over Cambridge University.

Alington continued playing in the 1877–78 season, switching between forward and goal, and scored in the Varsity match; this time however the Cantabs won 5–1. He also scored a late equalizer in the 3–3 draw against the Royal Engineers in the 1877–78 FA Cup fourth round stage, but the defeat in the second replay was his last Cup tie, and, also, his last recorded association match.

== Post-university ==
Alington was ordained as a deacon in 1884, originally serving in Leicester, and he was based there when he married Margaret Maclaren in Summertown on 30 July 1885. The couple lived afterwards in Summertown and had at least two sons - Geoffey Hugh (b. 7 December 1888) and John Marmaduke (b. 17 August 1890).

He later became headmaster of Summer Fields in Oxford, a post he held from 1918 to 1927. He died at Bardwell Court, Oxford, on 11 September 1938.
