= Sydney Wright =

Sydney Wright may refer to:

- S. Fowler Wright, English writer
- Syd Wright, Australian rules footballer
- Sydney Wright (footballer), English footballer and referee
