= Henry Otter =

Henry Otter may refer to:

- Henry Otter (footballer) (1856–1879), English footballer
- Henry Charles Otter (1807–1876), Royal Navy officer and hydrographic surveyor
