= Evelyn Waddington =

English footballer (1850–1938)

Personal information
- Date of birth: 5 July 1857
- Place of birth: Llanllowell, Monmouthshire, Wales
- Date of death: 25 August 1928 (aged 71)
- Place of death: Usk, Monmouthshire
- Positions: Full-back; half-back

Senior career*
Years	Team	Apps	(Gls)
1873–1876	Westminster School		
1876–1879	Oxford University		
- * Club domestic league appearances and goals

Evelyn Waddington (5 July 1857 – 25 August 1928) was a Welsh footballer and cricketer, who played in the 1877 FA Cup final for Oxford University.

== Early life ==
Waddington was the sixth son of Alexander Joseph Waddington of Llanllowell. He was educated at Westminster School, an early adopter of association laws, on an open scholarship. He represented the school at football and cricket.

== Football career ==
Waddington first represented his school against external opposition in November 1873, striking a post in the 1–0 win over the Gitanos. His first goal came with a "beautiful kick" later in the month against the 1st Surrey Rifles; the school won 4–1.

He remained a regular for the school until the end of the 1875–76 season, by which time he was regularly playing as full-back or, more usually, half-back.

In 1876, he went up to Oriel College, Oxford. He made his debut for the Dark Blues in a 1–0 win over the Wanderers in the Parks in November, playing as half-back. He was not a regular player; he only played in three such matches (including another win over the Wanderers), and as one of the two full-backs in Oxford's 1–0 win over Cambridge University in the Varsity match.

In the 1876–77 FA Cup he did not make an appearance until the last 5 stage, as half-back in the university's draw with Upton Park at the Kennington Oval. He played in the replay and with the last kick of the game cleared an Upton Park corner to clinch the tie for the university.

Oxford had a bye into the final and Waddington "scored" the opening goal against the Wanderers, when a corner fell to him, and his hard shot pushed goalkeeper Arthur Kinnaird over the line with the ball; the decision to give the goal "seemed to be quite correct, and fully confirmed by the spectators in the vicinity of the Wanderers' goal". Oxford could not hold on to the lead and the Wanderers took the Cup in extra time.

In the 1877–78 FA Cup, he proved adept at the new law on throw-ins, a skill first exploited in the fourth round tie against the Royal Engineers. In the Varsity that season, he played as half-back; this time however the Cantabs won 5–1. He continued playing for the university until 1889, captaining the side against Darwen in the 1878-79 FA Cup and Great Marlow in the following season, and his final match for the university was in a draw against the Old Etonians in November 1879. He finished his football career with a handful of old boy matches for the Old Westminsters, his last recorded match being a 4–1 defeat against the Old Wykehamists in December 1882, which he played in goal.

== Post-university ==
Between 1882 and 1886, he played a handful of matches for Monmouthshire County Cricket Club.

He married Lucy Jane Gustard in Llanbadoc on 18 January 1894, and the couple had a son and a daughter.

Waddington became a solicitor, and was clerk to the bench of magistrates in Usk. He died at his home, Beech House in Usk, on 25 August 1928, leaving his estate to his widow.
