= 1876–77 in English football =

Football in England
- Season: 1876–77

Men's football
- FA Cup: Wanderers

The 1876–77 season was the sixth season of competitive football in England.

== National team ==
Date	Venue	Opponents	Score	England scorers	Scotland scorers
3 March 1877	Kennington Oval, London	Scotland	1–3	Alfred Lyttelton (Cambridge University) (55 mins)	John Ferguson(2), James Richmond

Once again England played Scotland at the Kennington Oval This was England's first defeat on 'home soil'. The referee for this match was former England player, Robert Ogilvie.

== Honours ==
The season saw the first regional competitions in the English game at senior level; the Birmingham Senior Cup and the Sheffield Challenge Cup. The Sheffield Cup was played to Sheffield rules in force at the time, which were very similar to the Association laws, the key differences being an offside more generous to attackers, and throw-ins which - unlike Association - could be in any direction. Both cups were played by sides with 12 players as the association laws still did not mandate a team size.

Competition	Winner
FA Cup	Wanderers (4*)
Birmingham Senior Cup	Wednesbury Old Athletic (1)
Sheffield Challenge Cup	The Wednesday (1)

Notes = Number in parentheses is the times that club has won that honour. * indicates new record for competition
