= Club crest =

Logo used by a sports club

Crest of Inter Miami CF on the shirt of Lionel Messi

In sport, a club crest is the term used to describe a logo used by a sports club. Such a logo is also often termed a badge. The logos of many clubs are inspired by heraldic design.

An early association football club to adopt a crest was Woodford Wells, whose jerseys featured a Maltese Cross in the early 1870s. However, football club crests did not always hold their current importance. In the case of Aston Villa F.C., while the rampant lion was associated with the club from near its inception in 1874, the earliest known crest, the lion rampant to dexter (facing left) on a shield with motto "Prepared", was first documented in the club programme of 1 September 1906.

The use of the term crest to describe a logo derives from the misconception that a crest refers to any emblem that is heraldic. In heraldry, a crest specifically refers to the element of a coat of arms which appears above a helmet.

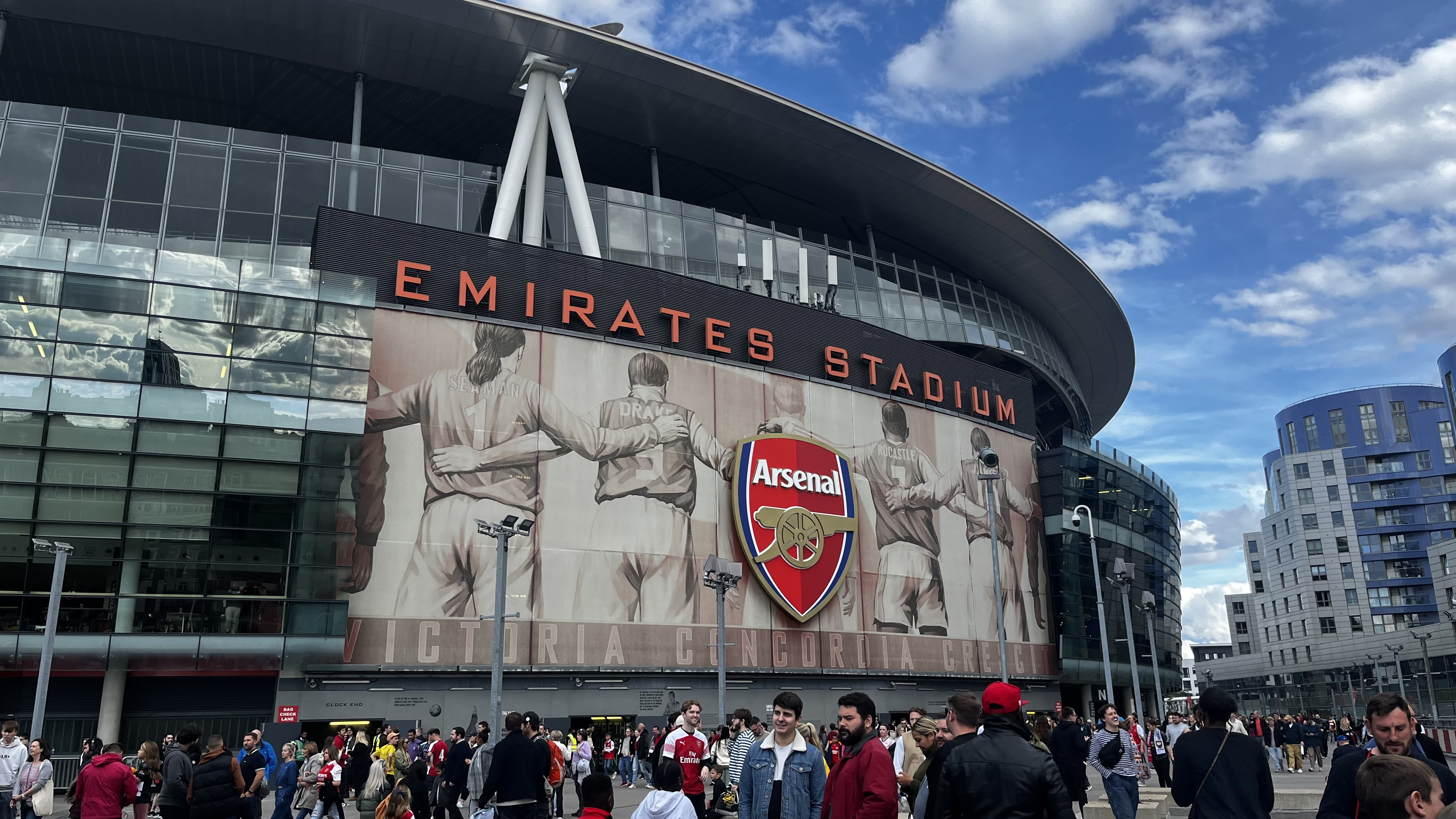
Club crest of Arsenal F.C. displayed at Emirates Stadium in London.

Due to the heraldic design of many club logos, they are sometimes regulated in regions with heraldic authorities. In Scotland, some club logos have been deemed "an heraldic device" by the Court of the Lord Lyon. Because heraldic devices must be authorised by this court, some clubs have been required to change their logos to designs which are not heraldic. Alternatively, a club may apply to have its logo authorised by the Court of the Lord Lyon. Similarly, the College of Arms has regulated club logos, with at least 25 football clubs in England and Wales having designs authorised by the college. In those cases, the English Football League was granted heraldic badges, which were subsequently licensed to the appropriate clubs.

== See also ==
- Crest (heraldry)
- Star (sport badge)
