= Shropshire Wanderers F.C. =

19th-century English football club

Shropshire Wanderers
- Full name: Shropshire Wanderers Football Club
- Nicknames: the Salopians, the Countrymen
- Founded: 1870
- Dissolved: c. 1882
- Ground: Racecourse Ground, Monkmoor, Shrewsbury
- Secretary: John Hawley Edwards
Home colours

Shropshire Wanderers F.C. was an amateur association football club based in Shrewsbury, England. The club was active during the 1870s and once reached the FA Cup semi-finals.

== History ==
The club was founded out of the Shropshire Wanderers cricket club. It entered the FA Cup competition in each of the years from 1873–74 to 1877–78.

Its greatest success came in 1874–75, when it reached the semi-finals. In the second round the club conceded a late equalizer to the Civil Service F.C. at the Kennington Oval, but the Service scratched from the replay, being unable to travel to Shrewsbury. The only match the club won in the tournament - and the only one the club would ever win in the Cup - was a replay win against Woodford Wells. The initial tie (at the Kennington Oval) ended 1–1, even after the sides played an optional 15 minutes of extra-time. The replay, at the same venue, was an easier match for the Salopians, a goal from Randall (following up his own shot coming back off the post) and an own goal from Frazer (getting in the way of a clearance at a scrimmage) putting the club into the last four.

The club played the Old Etonians at the Kennington Oval in the semi-final; unfortunately the Countrymen were without their star half-back John Denning, and lost 1–0. This was the club's only defeat in its first five years of existence.

The club also has a unique place in FA Cup history, as the only team to be eliminated from the competition by coin toss, after two draws with Sheffield F.C. in 1873–74; the fateful coin toss took place at the Raven Hotel in Shrewsbury, where the two clubs had retired to dine together after their replay.

The Shropshire Wanderers were notable as a team that employed passing as early as 1875, although it was also "notorious" for a hard-charging approach. The club shared a number of players (including John Hawley Edwards) with the Shrewsbury football club, which focussed on more local competition.

The club had ceased activity after the 1877–78 season, but reformed for a handful of matches at the start of the 1880s. The last recorded match of the club was a 5–3 defeat to Druids F.C. in March 1882. A match was scheduled against a club named Shrewsbury Town the following week but seems not to have taken place; this was not the current club.

== Colours ==
The club's colours were white jerseys, blue serge knickerbockers, and maroon stockings.

== Ground ==
The club played at the Racecourse, using the Raven or the Lion hotels for facilities.

== Notable players ==
- John Hawley Edwards, who made his only international appearance for England in 1874 whilst a Shropshire Wanderers player, scored for the more famous Wanderers club in the 1876 FA Cup Final and played for Wales against Scotland a week later.
- Llewelyn Kenrick, one of the founders of the Football Association of Wales played for the Shropshire Wanderers in the 1874–75 season, including the FA Cup semi-final.
- David Thomson, who won a cap for Wales (alongside Kenrick and Edwards) while a Shropshire Wanderers player.
- John Wylie, chosen for the England v Scotland match in 1874 while a Salopian, but forced to withdraw through injury and replaced by Hawley Edwards. However, as "one of the finest dribblers in the country", he did play for the Football Association in a representative match against the Sheffield Football Association the same year.

== FA Cup history ==
- FA Cup 1873–74
  - 1st Round: Drew 0–0 with Sheffield; replay also drawn 0–0; eliminated on the toss of a coin
- FA Cup 1874–75
  - 1st Round: Walkover v Sheffield (scratched)
  - 2nd Round: Drew 1–1 v Civil Service; walkover in the replay
  - 3rd Round: Drew 1–1 v Woodford Wells; won replay 2–0
  - Semi-final: Lost 1–0 v Old Etonians
- FA Cup 1875–76
  - 1st Round: Scratched (v Sheffield)
- FA Cup 1876–77
  - 1st Round: Walkover v Druids (scratched)
  - 2nd Round: Lost 3–0 v Royal Engineers
- FA Cup 1877–78
  - 1st Round: Lost 1–0 v Druids
