= Llanllowell =

Village in Monmouthshire, Wales

Coordinates: 51°40′59″N 2°52′48″W

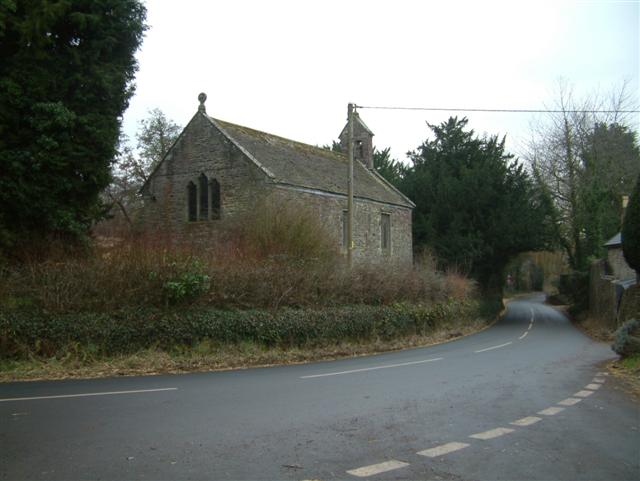
Llanllowell Church

Llanllowell (Welsh: Llanllywel) is a village in Monmouthshire, southeast Wales, in the United Kingdom. It is two miles southeast of Usk, in the community of Llantrisant Fawr.

== Location ==
Llanllowell stands on the eastern bank of the River Usk.

== History ==
The parish church is now considered dedicated to Saint Llywel. However, it was almost certainly originally dedicated to Saint Hywel.

== Famous people ==
- Evelyn Waddington, who played for Oxford University in the 1877 FA Cup final, was born in the village.
