= Woodford Wells F.C. =

Woodford Wells
- Full name: Woodford Wells Football Club
- Founded: 1869
- Dissolved: 1876
- Ground: Monkhams Lane
- Secretary: A. H. Tozer, A. A. Robertson
Home colours

Woodford Wells Football Club was an English association football club from Woodford Wells in Essex.

== History ==
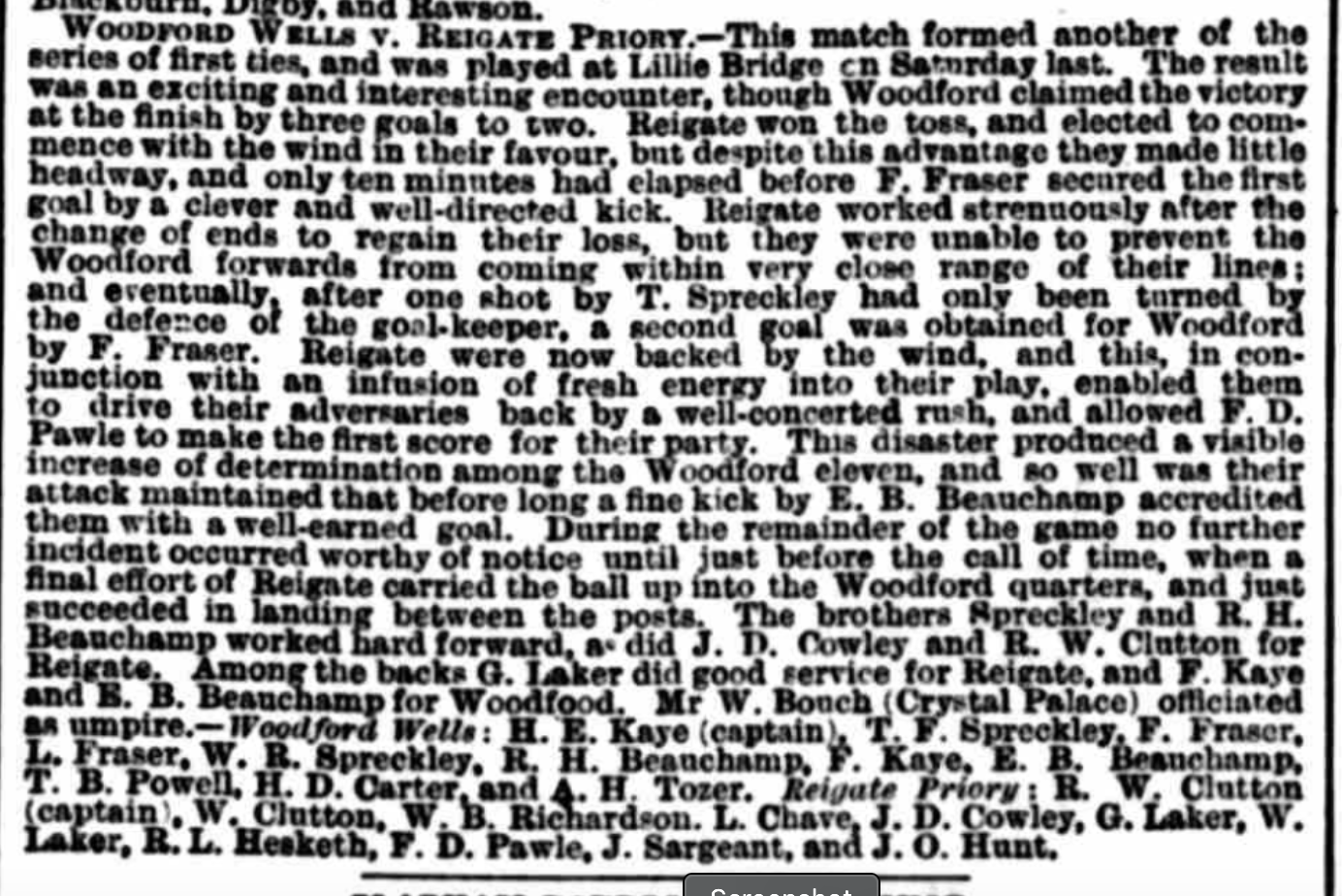
1873–74 FA Cup first round, Woodford Wells 3–2 Reigate Priory, Field, 18 October 1873

The club was founded in 1869 and its first match, against Forest School at the start of 1870, was played to a modified rugby code. The match was 15 per side (at the time association laws did not specify the size of teams) and included three Kaye brothers, three Spicer brothers, and two Powell brothers. The return fixture the next month was to association laws, although the club only had 10 players.

The 1872 A.G.M was held at the Travellers Rest Inn (now The Travellers Friend) at which the following officiated:

- President: J Spicer
- Hon. Sec.: A.H.Tozer
- Captain: H.E.Kaye
- Vice-Capt.: A.E.Hooper

The club's first entry into the FA Cup was in 1873–74. In the first round, the club beat Reigate Priory by 3–1 or 3–2; the Priory claimed a goal in the last minute and the sole umpire, Mr Bouch from Crystal Palace, gave it as "undecided". In the second round, the club lost 2–1 to the Swifts after playing into the wind for most of the game.

The following year saw the club's best FA Cup run, beating High Wycombe and Southall to reach the quarter-finals, losing to Shropshire Wanderers in a replay. The initial tie (at the Kennington Oval) ended 1–1 after the sides agreed to play the optional 15 minutes of extra-time. Shropshire won the replay (at the same venue) 2–0, the clinching goal being a Frazer own goal after a clearance bounced back off him.

The club's final FA Cup appearance was in the 1875–76 tournament, losing to Panthers in the first round at the neutral ground of Winchester College. Woodford Wells' final reported match was a 3–0 defeat to the Royal Engineers in March. However the club decided to dissolve in July 1876, apparently because of the lack of a club secretary; three of its regular players joined Upton Park instead, and a short-lived new club (Buckhurst Hill) formed in the town itself.

== Colours ==
The club's kit was black jersey, stockings and cap, with white Maltese cross on jersey and cap.

== Ground ==
The club's first ground was on Mr Buxton's field in Monkhams Lane (at the rear of the Travellers Rest), which is now The Woodford Wells Club. In October 1874 it moved to the Castle Green, with the club house at the Castle Hotel.

== Records ==
- Best FA Cup performance: Quarter-final – 1874–75
- Biggest win: 6–0 v Trojans, 11 February 1871

== Former players ==
- George Thomson, who played for the club in the 1875–76 season, and who was capped for Wales while registered with Woodford Wells.
