= Reading Hornets F.C. =

Reading Hornets
- Full name: Reading Hornets Football Club
- Nickname(s): Hornets
- Founded: 1873
- Dissolved: 1878
- Ground: Recreation Ground
Home colours

Reading Hornets F.C. was an English association football club.

== History ==
The club claimed a foundation date of 1873 and was certainly playing matches in the 1874–75 season.

The Hornets competed in the FA Cup in 1876 and 1877. In 1876-77 the club lost 2–0 to the Swifts in the first round; as local rivals Reading F.C. had not entered the competition, two of the Reading players (Rogers and Marks) guested for the Hornets. The club had generally had a good season, with a win over Cup regulars Maidenhead and no heavy defeats.

However a defeat against Reading in 1876 under acrimonious circumstances saw key players leaving the Hornets for the more established club at the start of the 1877–78 season (including captain Gilbert Sillence), and, after losing 10–0 to Maidenhead in the first round of the Cup (a tie so one-sided that the tenth goal was scored by the Maidenhead goalkeeper W. E. Lovegrove, who had come out of goal for the last ten minutes) the club did not have enough players remaining to fulfil the next two fixtures which it had arranged. Its last members joined Reading.

== Colours ==
The club wore black and amber jerseys, with a black cap and gold tassel.
