= Candlesby =

Village in Lincolnshire, England

Coordinates: 53.184235°N 0.176301°E

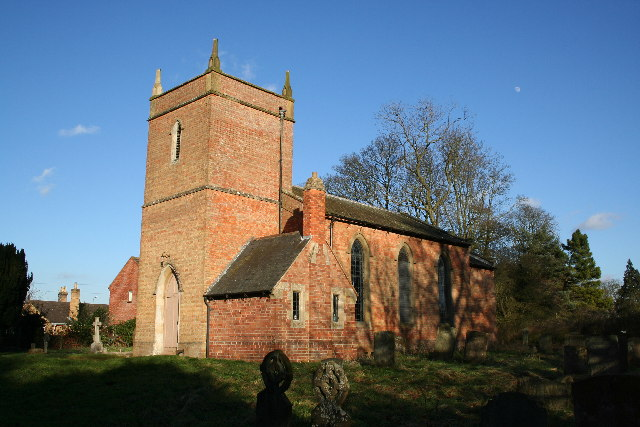
- St.Benedict's Church, Candlesby

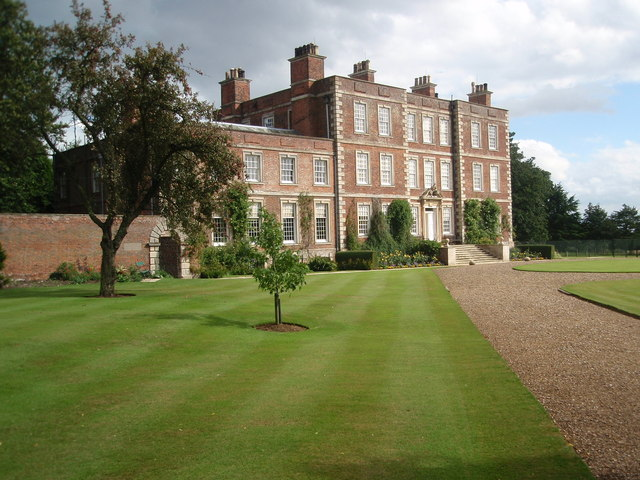
- Gunby Hall

- Location within Lincolnshire
- OS grid reference: TF455674
  - London: 115 mi (185 km) S
- Civil parish: Candlesby with Gunby
- District: East Lindsey
- Shire county: Lincolnshire
- Region: East Midlands
- Country: England
- Sovereign state: United Kingdom
- Post town: Spilsby
- Postcode district: PE23
- Police: Lincolnshire
- Fire: Lincolnshire
- Ambulance: East Midlands
- UK Parliament: Boston and Skegness

Candlesby is a village and former civil parish, now in the parish of Candlesby with Gunby, in the East Lindsey district of Lincolnshire, England. It is situated 5 miles (8 km) east from Spilsby. Gunby is a hamlet about 1 mile (1.6 km) east from Candlesby. In 1961 the parish had a population of 144.

== Etymology ==
The name of Candleby first appears in the Domesday Book of 1086, as Calnodesbi, in the Wapentake of Candleshoe. The name is thought to derive from an Old English personal name Cal(u)nōþ in its genitive form Cal(u)nōþes, compounded with the Old Norse noun bȳ ("farm"). If so, the name once meant "Calnōth's farm".

Although wapentakes were abandoned as local government units in the 1890s, the name of the wapentake to which Candleby belonged, Candleshoe lives on as the local Deanery. The first part of this name, too, is thought to be the Old English personal name Cal(u)nōþ; Eilert Ekwall gave the second element as meaning "burial mound".

== History ==
Ancient finds at Candlesby include a crucifix brooch, armour, swords, and a shield, believed to be Saxon.

Gunby Hall was built around 1700 for Sir William, 3rd Baronet Massingberd, and was the former seat of the Massingberd family. The last in residence was Field Marshal Sir Archibald Montgomery-Massingberd. Today the hall is owned by the National Trust, and is a Grade I listed building.

On 1 April 1987 the parish was abolished and merged with Gunby to form "Candlesby with Gunby".

== Community ==
The present Candlesby parish church is dedicated to Saint Benedict, and is a Grade II listed building. It was built by E. D. Rainey of Spilsby, in 1838, replacing an earlier church that had become derelict.

Gunby ecclesiastical parish is said to number "27 souls", and is served by St Peter's Church. Rebuilt on medieval foundations in the 1870s the Church is accessible only through the Hall's gardens but it remains the active parish church of Gunby with a service once a month.

A school was built here in 1872, but closed in 1933 with only three children in attendance.

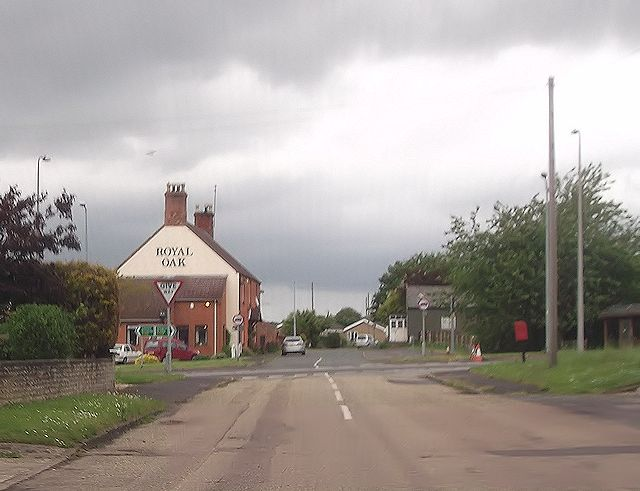
The Royal Oak

The village has several daily bus services associated with school travel, and an hourly service to Lincoln and Skegness. The bus stop is adjacent to the Royal Oak public house.

== Notable people ==
- Edward Alington, FA Cup finalist, was born in the village in 1857.
