= Arthur Todd =

English footballer (1854–1945)

Personal information
- Full name: Arthur Horatio Todd
- Date of birth: 7 July 1854
- Place of birth: Marylebone, London, England
- Date of death: 21 May 1945 (aged 90)
- Place of death: Kasauli, British India
- Position: Forward

Senior career*
Years	Team	Apps	(Gls)
1876–77	Oxford University		
- * Club domestic league appearances and goals

Arthur Horatio Todd (7 July 1854 – 21 May 1945) was an association footballer and barrister who played in the 1877 FA Cup final for Oxford University.

== Early life ==
Todd was born in Marylebone, the 5th son of John Todd, a London merchant.

He entered Eton College in 1868, and enjoyed a distinguished sporting career at the college. He was part of the rowing eights in 1872, played in the Wall Game for the Oppidans in 1871 and 1872, was Keeper of the Mixed Wall side in the latter year, and played in the Field XI in the same two years. He was President of the Eton Society in the 1872–73 school year.

In 1873, he went up to University College, Oxford, and took his Bachelor of Arts in 1878.

== Football career ==
Todd's first recorded football match against a non-Eton side was against the Gitanos club (which featured many Old Etonians) in November 1872, and which was played to the Field Game rules. Having gone up to the University of Oxford, he played for the Oxford Etonians against his old school in November 1873 in another Field Game match, and finally started playing the association game in November 1875, his first such match being for University College against the university side.

He did not play for the university under association laws until 13 December 1876, but the match was a memorable one, as the university beat the Wanderers 1–0 at the Kennington Oval. The next day he made his FA Cup debut for the university in a 6–1 win over the 105th Regiment at the same venue, scoring the second goal "after a short run".

He only played one more tie (the last-5 stage win over Upton Park) before the final, against the Wanderers, and the university went down in extra-time, despite Todd's "brilliant runs". Before the Upton Park tie, he picked up his Blue in the Varsity match against Cambridge University, which Oxford won 1–0, despite being down to ten men after one of Todd's fellow forwards was injured just before half-time.

The Cup final appears to have been Todd's final match; he did not appear in the 1877–78 FA Cup and did not join another club after graduating.

== Post-football career ==
Todd was called to the Bar in 1880 as a tenant of the Inner Temple. He worked on the South-Eastern circuit, and also became known as an editor of legal textbooks, his works including A Digest of Criminal Law Cases and later editions of On Parliamentary Government in England.

He married Catherine (née Ashworth), the daughter of the rector of Didcot in Wallingford in 1883 and the couple had one son, Arthur Henry Ashworth born on 6 August 1884; Catherine however died 21 days afterwards and Todd never remarried.

He died at his home in Kasauli, in India, on 21 May 1945.
