= 1877 FA Cup final =

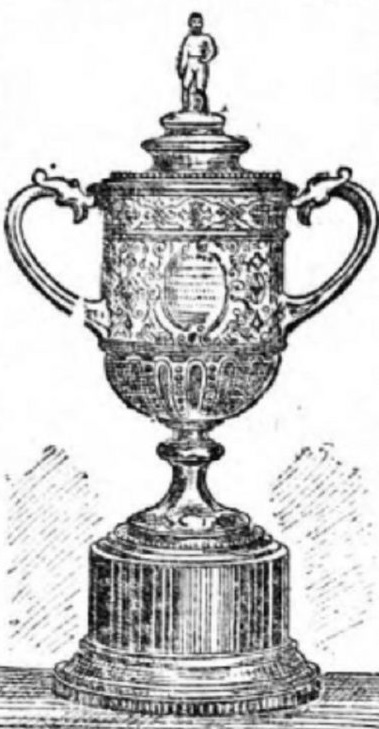
- An illustration of the FA Cup trophy awarded in 1877
- Event: 1876–77 FA Cup
Wanderers	Oxford University
2	1
- After extra time
- Date: 24 March 1877
- Venue: Kennington Oval, London
- Referee: Sydney Havell Wright (Great Marlow F.C.)
- Attendance: 3,000

The 1877 FA Cup final was a football match between Wanderers and Oxford University on 24 March 1877 at Kennington Oval in London. It was the sixth final of the world's oldest football competition, the Football Association Challenge Cup (known in the modern era as the FA Cup). Wanderers were the reigning cup-holders and had won the competition three times in total. Oxford had also previously won the tournament, making this the first FA Cup final played between two former winners. Wanderers had reached the final without conceding a goal, defeating Cambridge University in the semi-finals. Oxford had only played three matches in the five rounds prior to the final due to a combination of byes and opponents withdrawing.

Oxford took the lead in the final when Arthur Kinnaird, the Wanderers goalkeeper, stepped behind his goal-line while holding the ball, thereby scoring an own goal. Wanderers equalised in the dying stages of the match and scored the winning goal in extra time. Oxford's goal was struck from the official records after the match, but reinstated over a hundred years later.

== Route to the final ==
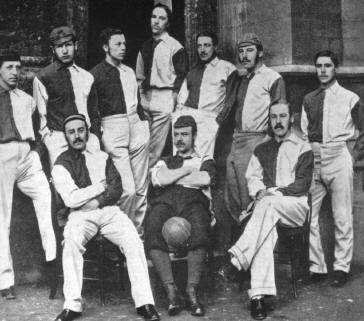
Oxford University players of the 1876–77 season. Six of the players photographed played in the cup final

Wanderers were the reigning cup holders and had also won the tournament in both 1872 and 1873. Oxford University had won the competition in 1874. Both teams entered the competition at the first round stage and were allocated home matches against Saffron Walden and Old Salopians respectively. Neither match took place, however, as in each case the away team withdrew from the competition, giving their opponents a bye into the next round. In the second round, Wanderers and Oxford both scored six goals, defeating Southall and 105th Regiment respectively.

In the third round, Wanderers beat Pilgrims 3–0 and Oxford again progressed without playing when their scheduled opponents, the leading Scottish club Queen's Park, withdrew. Wanderers themselves progressed through the quarter-finals on a bye as an uneven number of teams remained in the competition. Oxford were held to a goalless draw by Upton Park, but emerged victorious after a replay two weeks later. In the semi-finals Oxford received a bye, progressing straight to the final, and Wanderers beat the other of the great universities, Cambridge University, 1–0.

== Match ==
=== Summary ===
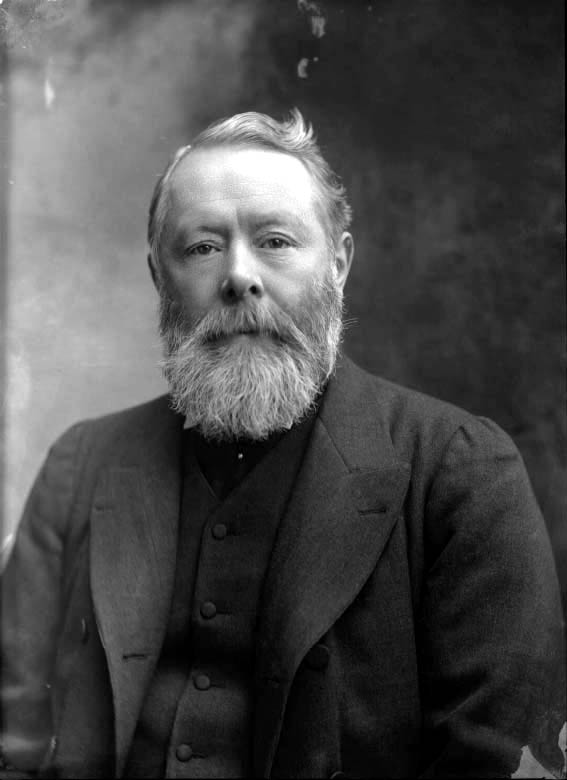
Arthur Kinnaird was in goal for Wanderers

Both teams chose to play with two full-backs, two half-backs and six forwards, in keeping with the attacking style of play generally employed at the time. Arthur Kinnaird played in goal for Wanderers, even though he had played as a forward in three earlier cup final appearances. At the time, the position of goalkeeper was not considered a specialised one, and players often alternated between playing in goal and playing in outfield positions. The game was played at Kennington Oval, home of Surrey County Cricket Club and took place in extremely bad weather, with rain and sleet hampering the players. Wanderers won the coin toss and chose to begin the match defending the Harleyford Road end of the stadium.

The Wanderers players began the game in relative disarray, which the correspondent from The Sportsman reported was not an uncommon feature of their matches. After fifteen minutes Oxford were awarded a corner kick, which Evelyn Waddington kicked high towards the goal. Kinnaird caught the ball, but in doing so stepped behind the goal-line. The Oxford players immediately appealed for a goal to be awarded, and after a consultation the officials did so, giving the University team the lead. Some time later, Charles Wollaston was injured and swapped positions with Kinnaird. At the time the concept of substitution had not been introduced to the sport, so injured players were obliged to remain in the game unless they were completely unable to play on, but it was common for an injured player to "retire into goal", where it was felt he would be less of a liability.

As Wanderers pressed for an equaliser, Francis Birley took an indirect free kick, which went into the Oxford goal, but no goal was awarded as the ball had gone straight in without touching another player. Four minutes from the end of the game, Hubert Heron made what The Field called a "splendid run" and passed the ball to Jarvis Kenrick, whose shot eluded Oxford goalkeeper Edward Alington to level the scores and send the game into extra time. Seven minutes into the extra period, William Lindsay's goalbound shot was headed away by an Oxford player but the ball rebounded to Lindsay who sent it past Alington to give Wanderers a lead which the cup holders kept until the end of the game and thus retained the trophy.

=== Details ===
24 March 1877

Wanderers	2–1 (a.e.t.)	Oxford University
Kenrick 86'; Lindsay 97'		Kinnaird 15' (o.g.)

Kennington Oval, London
Attendance: 3,000
Referee: Sidney Havell Wright (Great Marlow F.C.)

Wanderers	Oxford Univ.

GK	(Scotland) Arthur Kinnaird
FB	(England) Alfred Stratford
FB	(England) William Lindsay
HB	(England) Francis Birley
HB	(England) Frederick Green
FW	(England) Charles Wollaston
FW	(England) Thomas Hughes
FW	(England) Hubert Heron
FW	(England) Henry Wace
FW	(England) Charles Denton
FW	(England) Jarvis Kenrick

GK	(England) Edward Alington
FB	(Cape Colony) Owen Dunell
FB	(England) William Rawson
HB	(Wales) Evelyn Waddington
HB	(England) Rev. James Henry Savory
FW	(British Raj) Rev. Philip Hosken Fernandez
FW	(England) Edward Hagarty Parry
FW	(England) Henry Otter
FW	(England) Arthur Todd
FW	(England) Arnold Hills
FW	(England) John Bain

Match rules:

- 90 minutes normal time.
- 30 minutes extra-time if scores are level, at captains' discretion.
- Replay if scores still level.
- No substitutes.

== Post-match ==
Some time after the match, Kinnaird informed the council of the Football Association (FA), of which he was a member, that in his opinion he had not carried the ball over the line for Oxford's goal. Despite the fact that the referee had awarded the goal and multiple newspaper reports stated that the ball had clearly gone over the line, Kinnaird's fellow council members took his word for it, and struck the goal from the records, changing the official score to 2–0 (although if Oxford had not scored, there would have been no reason for the game to go to extra time, so in theory they should have annulled Wanderers' second goal as well). For the next century, all sources reported the score of the match as 2–0. In the 1980s, after fresh research into contemporary reports of the game by football historians, the FA reinstated the Oxford goal, and now regard the official final score of the 1877 final as 2–1.
