= Surrey Senior Cup =

Saturday Senior Cup
- Founded: 1882
- Region: England
- Current champions: Farnham Town
- Most championships: Dulwich Hamlet (16 times)
- Website: www.surreyfa.com

The Surrey Senior Cup is the senior Saturday cup competition of the Surrey FA. It is currently competed for by teams playing in the top nine levels of the English football league system who are affiliated to the Surrey FA. The competition was introduced in 1882, at the same time as the Surrey FA voted to affiliate to the Football Association.

== Finals ==
No finals took place from 1914 to 1919 (due to World War I), from 1940 to 1943 (due to World War II), and from 2020 to 2021 (due to the COVID-19 pandemic).

Season	Winners	Score	Runners-up	Notes	Venue	Attendance
1882–83	Reigate Priory	2–0	East Sheen		Park Lane, Reigate	
1883–84	Barnes	3–2	Reigate Priory		The Oval, Kennington	
1884–85	East Sheen	2–1	Reigate Priory		The Oval, Kennington	250
1885–86	Reigate Priory	2–0	Dorking		Sondes Place, Dorking	
1886–87	Guy's Hospital	2–0	Reigate Priory		Sondes Place, Dorking	
1887–88	Lyndhurst	w/o	Barnes	Barnes failed to fulfil replay after 1–1 draw.	First match: Walton-on-Thames	
1888–89	Guy's Hospital	2–1	Lyndhurst	After extra time. 1–1 at the end of normal time.	Pixham Lane, Dorking	400
1889–90	Royal Scots	5–2	Reigate Priory		Woodbridge Road, Guildford	2000
1890–91	Reigate Priory	3–1	Surbiton Hill		Woodbridge Road, Guildford	1000
1891–92	Reigate Priory	3–1	Guy's Hospital		Woodbridge Road, Guildford	500+
1892–93	Weybridge	3–2	Vampires		Woodbridge Road, Guildford	1000+
1893–94	Reigate Priory	4–0	Guy's Hospital	Replay after 1–1 draw	Replay: Woodbridge Road, Guildford	Replay: 2000
1894–95	Weybridge	6–0	West Croydon		Woodbridge Road, Guildford	2500
1895–96	West Croydon	2–1	Weybridge		Woodbridge Road, Guildford	2000
1896–97	Reigate Priory	3–2	Weybridge		Woodbridge Road, Guildford	4000
1897–98	Weybridge	4–0	Woking		Woodbridge Road, Guildford	
1898–99	Weybridge	2–0	Ewell		Dinton Road, Kingston upon Thames	3500
1899–1900	West Croydon	4–0	Guildford		Kingston upon Thames	2500
1900–01	East Sheen	1–0	Weybridge		Woodbridge Road, Guildford	1500
1901–02	Weybridge	3–1	West Croydon		Woodbridge Road, Guildford	2000
1902–03	Townley Park	4–0	Sanatorium		Woodbridge Road, Guildford	900
1903–04	Townley Park	4–3	Guards' Depot	Replay after 1–1 draw	First match: Brigstock Road, Thornton Heath; Replay: Woodbridge Road, Guildford	First match: 4000
1904–05	Dulwich Hamlet	3–1	Redhill		Brigstock Road, Thornton Heath	4000+
1905–06	Dulwich Hamlet	2–1	Croydon	Second replay. First match finished 0–0, second match finished 3–0 to Dulwich but ordered to be replayed after Croydon protested about spectator encroachment	First match: Woodbridge Road, Guildford; Replay: Crystal Palace; Second replay: Herne Hill Track	First match: 3200; Replay: see (Note: The 1905–06 final was played immediately after the FA Cup final which had an attendance of 75,609. It's not known exactly how many people stayed to watch the match.); Second replay: 2000+
1906–07	Clapham	3–1	Kingston-on-Thames		Croydon	4000
1907–08	Nunhead	2–0	Woking		Woodbridge Road, Guildford	3000
1908–09	Dulwich Hamlet	1–0	Metrogas		Herne Hill Track	8000
1909–10	Dulwich Hamlet	2–1	Woking	Replay after 0–0 draw	First match: Norbiton Sports Ground; Replay: Memorial Park, Redhill	First match: 3000
1910–11	Old Kingstonians	2–1	Woking	Replay after 0–0 draw	Both at Woodbridge Road, Guildford	First match: 2000; Replay: 2000
1911–12	Summerstown	1–0	Dulwich Hamlet		Norbiton Sports Ground	2000+
1912–13	Woking	2–0	Metrogas		Norbiton Sports Ground	2000
1913–14	Old Kingstonians	3–1	Metrogas		Champion Hill, East Dulwich	3500
1919–20	Dulwich Hamlet	1–0	Metrogas		Plough Lane, Wimbledon	6000
1920–21	Metrogas	0–0	Wimbledon	Joint holders	The Nest, Selhurst	4-5000
1921–22	Metrogas	1–0	West Norwood		Browns Field, Nunhead	
1922–23	Dulwich Hamlet	2–1	Wimbledon		Richmond Road, Kingston upon Thames	5000+
1923–24	Summerstown	1–0	Wimbledon		Richmond Road, Kingston upon Thames	6000
1924–25	Dulwich Hamlet	2–1	Tooting Town		Browns Field, Nunhead	
1925–26	Kingstonian	2–1	Redhill		Plough Lane, Wimbledon	
1926–27	Woking	3–0	Redhill		Joseph's Road, Guildford	7000
1927–28	Dulwich Hamlet	3–0	Woking		Richmond Road, Kingston upon Thames	4000
1928–29	Redhill	3–2	Epsom Town		Joseph's Road, Guildford	4600
1929–30	Casuals	2–1	Nunhead		Joseph's Road, Guildford	3000
1930–31	Kingstonian	2–0	Mitcham Wanderers		Plough Lane, Wimbledon	5000
1931–32	Kingstonian	2–0	Dulwich Hamlet	After extra time	Plough Lane, Wimbledon	10000
1932–33	Metropolitan Police	2–1	Dulwich Hamlet		Plough Lane, Wimbledon	5672
1933–34	Dulwich Hamlet	5–2	Wimbledon	Replay after 0–0 draw	First match: Champion Hill, East Dulwich; Replay: Plough Lane, Wimbledon	First match: 9280; Replay: 11000
1934–35	Kingstonian	2–0	Woking		Champion Hill, East Dulwich	3500
1935–36	Wimbledon	3–1	Camberley & Yorktown		Champion Hill, East Dulwich	
1936–37	Dulwich Hamlet	2–0	Kingstonian	After extra time	Plough Lane, Wimbledon	
1937–38	Tooting & Mitcham United	2–1	Dulwich Hamlet		Selhurst Park, Selhurst	
1938–39	Kingstonian	3–2	Wimbledon		Selhurst Park, Selhurst	
1939–40	Wimbledon	3–1	Tooting & Mitcham United		Selhurst Park, Selhurst	4000+
1943–44	Tooting & Mitcham United	3–1	Epsom Town		Sandy Lane, Mitcham	5000+
1944–45	Tooting & Mitcham United	4–2	Sutton United		Sandy Lane, Mitcham	
1945–46	Sutton United	1–0	Woking		Richmond Road, Kingston upon Thames	6000
1946–47	Dulwich Hamlet	6–0	Walton & Hersham		Selhurst Park, Selhurst	
1947–48	Walton & Hersham	2–1	Kingstonian		Selhurst Park, Selhurst	
1948–49	Wimbledon	5–0	Tooting & Mitcham United		Selhurst Park, Selhurst	15250
1949–50	Dulwich Hamlet	5–2	Kingstonian		Selhurst Park, Selhurst	13700
1950–51	Walton & Hersham	2–1	Dulwich Hamlet		Selhurst Park, Selhurst	
1951–52	Kingstonian	2–1	Walton & Hersham		Selhurst Park, Selhurst	
1952–53	Tooting & Mitcham United	2–1	Wimbledon		Selhurst Park, Selhurst	8000+
1953–54	Corinthian-Casuals	2–0	Epsom F.C.		Selhurst Park, Selhurst	6159
1954–55	Wimbledon	2–1	Sutton United		Selhurst Park, Selhurst	7442
1955–56	Woking	1–0	Tooting & Mitcham United		Champion Hill, East Dulwich	5100
1956–57	Woking	4–2	Wimbledon		Selhurst Park, Selhurst	4500
1957–58	Dulwich Hamlet	1–0	Carshalton Athletic		Selhurst Park, Selhurst	
1958–59	Dulwich Hamlet	4–1	Woking		Selhurst Park, Selhurst	5464
1959–60	Tooting & Mitcham United	3–0	Walton & Hersham		Plough Lane, Wimbledon	
1960–61	Walton & Hersham	2–1	Wimbledon		Sandy Lane, Mitcham	
1961–62	Walton & Hersham	3–1	Sutton United		Sandy Lane, Mitcham	
1962–63	Kingstonian	3–1	Sutton United		Sandy Lane, Mitcham	
1963–64	Kingstonian	3–1	Sutton United	Replay after 1–1 draw	First match: Sandy Lane, Mitcham; Replay: Richmond Road, Kingston upon Thames	
1964–65	Sutton United	3–2	Leatherhead		Richmond Road, Kingston upon Thames	2000
1965–66	Redhill	4–3	Sutton United		Sandy Lane, Mitcham	
1966–67	Kingstonian	2–1	Leatherhead		Sandy Lane, Mitcham	1600
1967–68	Sutton United	1–0	Dulwich Hamlet	Replay after 1–1 draw	First match: Stompond Lane, Walton-on-Thames; Replay: Richmond Road, Kingston upon Thames	
1968–69	Leatherhead	3–1	Redhill		Gander Green Lane, Sutton	1151
1969–70	Sutton United	4–0	Walton & Hersham	Replay after 1–1 draw	First match: Champion Hill, East Dulwich; Replay: Fetcham Grove, Leatherhead	
1970–71	Walton & Hersham	3–0	Woking		Memorial Park, Redhill	
1971–72	Woking	1–0	Walton & Hersham		Richmond Road, Kingston upon Thames	2000
1972–73	Walton & Hersham	2–0	Kingstonian		Kingfield Stadium, Woking	
1973–74	Dulwich Hamlet	2–0	Walton & Hersham	Replay after 0–0 draw	Both at War Memorial Sports Ground, Carshalton	
1974–75	Dulwich Hamlet	2–0	Leatherhead		Stompond Lane, Walton-on-Thames	
1975–76	Tooting & Mitcham United	2–1	Sutton United	After extra time	Richmond Road, Kingston upon Thames	
1976–77	Tooting & Mitcham United	1–0	Croydon		Gander Green Lane, Sutton	
1977–78	Tooting & Mitcham United	2–1	Woking		Fetcham Grove, Leatherhead	
1978–79	Camberley Town	4–1	Leatherhead	After extra time	Imber Court, East Molesey	1400
1979–80	Sutton United	1–0	Tooting & Mitcham United		Fetcham Grove, Leatherhead	
1980–81	Epsom & Ewell	2–1	Woking		Sandy Lane, Mitcham	
1981–82	Croydon	2–0	Sutton United		Kingfield Stadium, Woking	
1982–83	Sutton United	4–0	Tooting & Mitcham United		Richmond Road, Kingston upon Thames	
1983–84	Sutton United	4–0	Epsom & Ewell		Imber Court, East Molesey	1000+
1984–85	Sutton United	2–0	Addlestone & Weybridge Town	After extra time	Croydon Sports Arena, South Norwood	
1985–86	Sutton United	2–0	Chertsey Town		Richmond Road, Kingston upon Thames	
1986–87	Sutton United	4–0	Woking		Imber Court, East Molesey	
1987–88	Sutton United	4–1	Whyteleafe		Sandy Lane, Mitcham	
1988–89	Carshalton Athletic	4–2	Woking		Stompond Lane, Walton-on-Thames	
1989–90	Carshalton Athletic	4–2	Dorking	After extra time	Kingsmeadow, Kingston upon Thames	
1990–91	Woking	3–0	Kingstonian		Gander Green Lane, Sutton	2871
1991–92	Carshalton Athletic	3–1	Egham Town		Sandy Lane, Mitcham	
1992–93	Sutton United	2–1	Carshalton Athletic		Gander Green Lane, Sutton	1453
1993–94	Woking	3–1	Sutton United		Kingsmeadow, Kingston upon Thames	
1994–95	Sutton United	3–1	Carshalton Athletic		Kingfield Stadium, Woking	
1995–96	Woking	2–0	Tooting & Mitcham United		Kingsmeadow, Kingston upon Thames	
1996–97	Crystal Palace	1–0	Carshalton Athletic		War Memorial Sports Ground, Carshalton	
1997–98	Kingstonian	2–1	Woking	Replay after 1–1 draw	Gander Green Lane, Sutton	First match: 1584; Replay: 1113
1998–99	Sutton United	3–0	Carshalton Athletic		Imber Court, East Molesey	870
1999–2000	Woking	1–0	Croydon		Kingfield Stadium, Woking	
2000–01	Crystal Palace	3–0	Tooting & Mitcham United		Gander Green Lane, Sutton	
2001–02	Crystal Palace	3–0	Woking		Imber Court, East Molesey	c. 800
2002–03	Sutton United	2–1	Kingstonian		Imber Court, East Molesey	775
2003–04	Woking	2–1	Sutton United		Imber Court, East Molesey	1100
2004–05	AFC Wimbledon	2–1	Walton & Hersham	After extra time	Kingfield Stadium, Woking	3809
2005–06	Kingstonian	1–0	AFC Wimbledon		Kingfield Stadium, Woking	3718
2006–07	Tooting & Mitcham United	4–1	Metropolitan Police	After extra time	Gander Green Lane, Sutton	378
2007–08	Merstham	3–2	Whyteleafe	After extra time	Imber Court, East Molesey	468
2008–09	Ashford Town (Middx)	3–2	Woking		Imber Court, East Molesey	467
2009–10	Godalming Town	2–1	Sutton United		Imber Court, East Molesey	404
2010–11	Corinthian-Casuals	2–0	Leatherhead		Gander Green Lane, Sutton	785
2011–12	Woking	3–1	Sutton United		Kingsmeadow, Kingston upon Thames	917
2012–13	Godalming Town	1–0	Sutton United		Gander Green Lane, Sutton	677
2013–14	Woking	6–0	Metropolitan Police		Kingfield Stadium, Woking	832
2014–15	Metropolitan Police	2–0	Merstham		Kingfield Stadium, Woking	370
2015–16	Merstham	4–1	Godalming Town		Kingfield Stadium, Woking	560
2016–17	Woking	4–0	Merstham		Kingfield Stadium, Woking	742
2017–18	Merstham	3–1	Leatherhead		Gander Green Lane, Sutton	366
2018–19	Metropolitan Police	2–0	Tooting & Mitcham United		Meadowbank, Dorking	284
2021–22	Dorking Wanderers	1-1	Kingstonian	5–4 on penalties	Meadowbank, Dorking	1161
2022-23	Metropolitan Police	4-1	Virginia Water FC		Meadowbank, Dorking	318
2023-24	South Park (Reigate)	1-0	Farnham Town FC		Meadowbank, Dorking	549
2024-25	Walton & Hersham	3-1	Dorking Wanderers		Meadowbank, Dorking	1,359
2025-26	Farnham Town	1-1	Merstham	5–4 on penalties	Meadowbank, Dorking	956

== Results by team ==
Teams who have won the cup more than once

Club	Winners	Runners-up	Winning years
Dulwich Hamlet	16	6	1904–05, 1905–06, 1908–09, 1909–10, 1919–20, 1922–23, 1924–25, 1927–28, 1933–34, 1936–37, 1946–47, 1949–50, 1957–58, 1958–59, 1973–74, 1974–75
Sutton United	15	13	1945–46, 1964–65, 1967–68, 1969–70, 1979–80, 1982–83, 1983–84, 1984–85, 1985–86, 1986–87, 1987–88, 1992–93, 1994–95, 1998–99, 2002–03
Woking	13	16	1912–13, 1926–27, 1955–56, 1956–57, 1971–72, 1990–91, 1993–94, 1995–96, 1999–2000, 2003–04, 2011–12, 2013–14, 2016–17
Kingstonian	11	6	1925–26, 1930–31, 1931–32, 1934–35, 1938–39, 1951–52, 1962–63, 1963–64, 1966–67, 1997–98, 2005–06
Tooting & Mitcham United	9	8	1937–38, 1943–44, 1944–45, 1952–53, 1959–60, 1975–76, 1976–77, 1977–78, 2006–07
Walton & Hersham	7	7	1947–48, 1950–51, 1960–61, 1961–62, 1970–71, 1972–73, 2024–25
Reigate Priory	6	4	1882–83, 1885–86, 1890–91, 1891–92, 1893–94, 1896–97
Wimbledon	5	7	1920–21, 1935–36, 1939–40, 1948–49, 1954–55
Weybridge	5	3	1892–93, 1894–95, 1897–98, 1898–99, 1901–02
Metropolitan Police	4	2	1932–33, 2014–15, 2018–19, 2022–23
Carshalton Athletic	3	5	1988–89, 1989–90, 1991–92
Crystal Palace	3	0	1996–97, 2000–01, 2001–02
Merstham	3	2	2007–08, 2015–16, 2017–18
Metrogas	2	4	1920–21, 1921–22
Redhill	2	4	1928–29, 1965–66
West Croydon	2	2	1895–96, 1899–1900
Guy's Hospital	2	2	1886–87, 1888–89
'East Sheen	2	1	1884–85, 1900–01
Godalming Town	2	1	2009–10, 2012–13
Summerstown	2	0	1911–12, 1923–24
Old Kingstonians	2	0	1910–11, 1913–14
Townley Park	2	0	1902–03, 1903–04
Corinthian-Casuals	2	0	1953–54, 2010–11
Farnham Town	1	0	2025–26
