= John Hawley Edwards =

English footballer (1850–1893)

Personal information
- Full name: John Hawley Edwards
- Date of birth: 21 March 1850
- Place of birth: Shrewsbury, England
- Date of death: 14 January 1893 (aged 42)
- Place of death: Old Colwyn, Denbighshire, Wales
- Position: Inside forward

Senior career*
Years	Team	Apps	(Gls)
1873–1880	Shropshire Wanderers		
1874–1876	Wanderers		

International career
1874	England	1	(0)
1876	Wales	1	(0)
- * Club domestic league appearances and goals

John Hawley Edwards (21 March 1850 – 14 January 1893) was an English footballer who played as an inside forward. He made one appearance for England in 1874, before going on to play for Wales in 1876. He was a member of the Wanderers team that won the 1876 FA Cup Final.

== Career ==
Edwards was born in Shrewsbury, educated at Shifnal Grammar School, and was a qualified solicitor, being admitted in 1871. He played from 1873 to 1880 for Shropshire Wanderers, of which he was a founder and captain, when they reached the semi-final tie of the FA Cup in 1874–75 and were defeated by the Old Etonians.

He was called into the England side as a late replacement for another Shrewsbury-born player, John Wylie. He made his solitary England appearance on 7 March 1874 against Scotland, playing as an inside forward. After "a most competitive game", Scotland won 2–1, with Robert Kingsford scoring England's consolation goal.

He was also a member of the Wanderers team, making his first appearance on 4 March 1874, scoring in a 4–0 victory over Westminster School. In 1876, he only made two appearances for Wanderers, both in the Cup Final when he played at centre forward against the Old Etonians. In the first match, played at Kennington Oval on 11 March 1876, Edwards scored the first goal, turning in a cross from Charles Wollaston. The Old Etonians equalised through Alexander Bonsor, so the match went to a replay, which the Wanderers won 3–0, thus winning the trophy for the third time in five years.

Edwards had been instrumental in helping to establish the Welsh Football Association, serving as its first treasurer in 1876. A week after the FA Cup Final replay, Edwards played for the Wales national team in their inaugural match, played at Hamilton Crescent, Partick on 25 March 1876. The match ended in a 4–0 victory for the Scots. Edwards was one of two players to play at full international level for both England and Wales, the other being Robert Evans, who made ten appearances for Wales and then played four times for England. He also played in representative matches for North Wales and Staffordshire.

He captained the Shrewsbury Town team (not the present Shrewsbury Town F.C., formed 1886) from 1876 to 1880, during which time they won both the Birmingham Senior Cup and Shropshire County Cup in the 1877–78 season, two years before he ceased to play after a series of knee injuries.

Edwards was for a time also on the committee of the Birmingham and District Football Association and a founder of the county F.A. for Shropshire in 1877.

Edwards was also a useful cricketer and played for Shropshire from 1867 to 1876, and served the club as secretary, as well as for Warwickshire county (not first-class) and Shrewsbury Cricket Club.

He was later clerk to Shrewsbury Magistrates' Court for nineteen years until his death on 14 January 1893, while convalescing from throat infection at Old Colwyn in Wales He was buried in the General Cemetery at Longden Road, Shrewsbury.

== Honours ==
Wanderers

- FA Cup: 1876

== See also ==
- List of association footballers who have been capped for two senior national teams
- List of Wales international footballers born outside Wales
