= Candlesby with Gunby =

Coordinates: 53.18423°N 0.17630°E

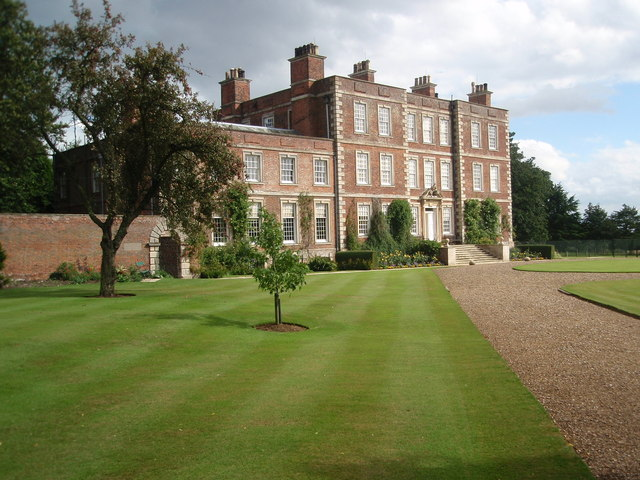
- Gunby Hall

- Location within Lincolnshire
- Population: 129 (2011)
- OS grid reference: TF455674
- Civil parish: Candlesby with Gunby
- District: East Lindsey
- Shire county: Lincolnshire
- Region: East Midlands
- Country: England
- Sovereign state: United Kingdom
- Post town: Spilsby
- Postcode district: PE23
- Police: Lincolnshire
- Fire: Lincolnshire
- Ambulance: East Midlands
- UK Parliament: Louth and Horncastle

Candlesby with Gunby is a civil parish in the East Lindsey district of Lincolnshire, England, about 5 miles (8.0 km) east of the town of Spilsby, and includes the village of Candlesby and hamlet of Gunby, the population of which in 2001 was 178, reducing to 129 at the 2011 Census.
