= Underdale, Shrewsbury =

Coordinates: 52.718°N 2.739°W

Underdale is a district of the town of Shrewsbury, county town of Shropshire, England. It is situated between the suburbs of Monkmoor and Castlefields, and stretches from Shrewsbury Abbey to the Telford Way, which is situated towards the north of the town. Underdale Road runs parallel to Monkmoor Road and is roughly the same length.

The suburb is an electoral district of Shropshire Council. It is currently a Liberal Democrat held ward. The population of the ward as taken at the 2011 Census was 4,495.

The River Severn flows around the western edge of the area.
