= Sydney Wright (footballer) =

English footballer (1846–1928)

Personal information
- Full name: Sydney Havell Wright
- Date of birth: December 1846
- Place of birth: Marlow, Buckinghamshire
- Date of death: 10 February 1928 (aged 81)
- Place of death: Marlow
- Position: Half-back

Senior career*
Years	Team	Apps	(Gls)
1871–77	Great Marlow		
- * Club domestic league appearances and goals

Sydney Havell Wright (1846– 10 February 1928) was an English footballer and referee, who refereed the 1877 FA Cup final.

== Early life ==
Wright was born in December 1846 in Marlow, into a family of paper manufacturers, and attended Craufurd College, Maidenhead.

== Sporting career ==
Wright was a founder member of both the Great Marlow football club (in 1870) and the Great Marlow Rowing Club (in 1871), holding the position of Honorary Secretary of the latter until his retirement from the role in 1888. He played in Great Marlow's first-ever football match, on 26 January 1871, a 0–0 draw against Windsor Home Park, and was captain of the club in the 1873–74, 1875–76, and 1876–77 seasons.

He played in the FA Cup for the first time in the first round in the 1873–74 tournament, Great Marlow losing 1–0 at Pilgrims on Hackney Downs. The first time he was on the winning side was in Great Marlow's 2–1 first round win over Herts Rangers in the 1876–77 first round, captaining the side from the half-back position, and notably disallowed one of his own side's goals by persuading the umpire to overturn the award of a goal, insisting that a Marlow shot had cleared the tape rather than going under it.

=== FA Cup final referee ===
Perhaps as a result of such scrupulous fairness, Wright was appointed as referee for the Cup final that year, between Wanderers and Oxford University. After a quarter of an hour, Wanderers goalkeeper Arthur Kinnaird caught a cross from Evelyn Waddington but in doing so, "to the amazement of the spectators", stumbled into his own goal. Wright, after consulting with the umpires, awarded a goal to Oxford University - "a decision that seemed to be quite correct,and fully confirmed by the spectators in the immediate vicinity of the Wanderers’ goal." Wanderers recovered to win 2–1 in extra time, but, some time after the game, Kinnaird's own goal was expunged from the records, and by 1879 at least the result was being given as 2–0; at the time, the referee's decision as to factual matters was not necessarily final, and decisions on matters such as goals could be appealed to the relevant association. The goal has since been re-instated and the score is once more credited as being 2–1.

== Personal life ==
In 1874, Wright married Nellie Silver, who died in March 1883; Wright did not re-marry. The couple had two children, one son and one daughter, who both pre-deceased him, although he was survived by several grandchildren. He left £12,472 17/8 in his will.
