= Monkhams =

Area of Woodford, London Borough of Redbridge, England

Coordinates: 51.617°N 0.026°E

Monkhams is an area in Woodford in the London Borough of Redbridge. The Monkhams Estate is an affluent area consisting mainly of large, detached homes.

== History ==
Monkhams was originally a country estate in northern Woodford in what was then rural Essex. It was historically owned by Stratford Langthorne Abbey. In the late 19th century, the area contained a country house, which was owned by West Ham United founder Arnold Hills. In 1901, Hills sold the land to pay off debts to developers, who built property targeted at middle and upper classes.

== Notable people ==
- Arnold Hills, founder of West Ham United.
- The British Prime Minister Clement Attlee lived in Monkhams. A blue plaque has been erected at his former home on the estate.

== Electoral ward ==
Monkhams is also a ward of the London Borough of Redbridge. The population of the ward at the 2011 Census was 10,422.
