= John Hughes (footballer, born 1855) =

Welsh footballer (1855–1914)

Personal information
- Date of birth: 1855
- Place of birth: Glynpadarn, Aberystwyth, Wales
- Date of death: 2 October 1914
- Place of death: Bloomsbury, England
- Position: Forward

Senior career*
Years	Team	Apps	(Gls)
1874–1878	Cambridge University		
1873–1879	Aberystwyth		

International career
1877–1879	Wales	2	(0)
- * Club domestic league appearances and goals

John Hughes (1855 – 2 October 1914) was a Welsh amateur footballer who made two appearances as a forward for Wales in 1877 and 1879. He was also involved in the early days of Aberystwyth Town Football Club.

== Early life and education ==
Hughes was born at Glynpadarn, near Aberystwyth, the son of Hugh Hughes, a local solicitor. He was educated at Shrewsbury School where he played "soccer" for the school first eleven in 1872–73.

In October 1874, he was admitted to Jesus College, Cambridge as a "pensioner", graduating with a Bachelor of Arts (B.A.) degree in 1878. At Cambridge, he was awarded a blue in 1875, 1876 and 1877; in the latter year, he played alongside fellow future Wales international, John Morgan.

== Football career ==
As early as 1873, Hughes and his brother, Hugh, are recorded as scoring three goals between them in a football match in Aberystwyth. Along with their elder brother, Arthur, the three men endeavoured to create a football club in the town, although it was not until October 1884 that the present club was formed, after Arthur placed an advertisement in the local press seeking "Gentlemen wishing to join the (Aberystwyth Football) Club".

Jack Hughes was captain of the local side until he moved away in 1879. Hughes was described as the "first exponent of the association game" in Aberystwyth and it was later said of him:

The pre-eminence of Jack Hughes cannot be over-emphasized . . . he was one of the best forwards in the United Kingdom. At that period, combination was unknown and a single good player in a team counted a lot, so that Aberystwyth in virtue alone of their possession of a footballer of so much renown held a high place in the football world.

Hughes's international debut came in the first international played in Wales, against Scotland on 5 March 1877. (The two countries had met the year before in Glasgow in Wales's first international match.) The match at Wrexham's Racecourse Ground ended in a 2–0 victory for the Scots. Hughes (now registered as an "Aberystwyth" player) was selected again two years later in April 1879, against the Scots; this match also ended in a Scottish victory, by a three-goal margin.

== Later career ==
In 1879, Hughes left Aberystwyth and moved to London where he became a solicitor. He died in Bloomsbury in October 1914.
