= Henry Otter (footballer) =

English footballer (1856–1879)

Personal information
- Full name: Henry Shirecliffe Otter
- Date of birth: 1856
- Place of birth: Westminster
- Date of death: 29 December 1879 (aged 22–23)
- Place of death: Piccadilly
- Position: Forward

Youth career
- 1870–74: Westminster School

Senior career*
Years	Team	Apps	(Gls)
1873–74	Barnes		
1873–78	Wanderers		
1874–78	Oxford University		
- * Club domestic league appearances and goals

Henry Otter was a footballer who played in the 1877 FA Cup final for Oxford University.

== Early life ==
Otter was born in 1856, the fifth son of Charles (an examiner in the Court of Chancery) and Elinor (née Parker), and educated at Winchester College, which was an early adopter of the association laws. In 1870 he was the last pupil "head" to undergo the dangerous tradition of 'chairing'. This involved the leading Queen's Scholar being carried on a raised chair around Great Dean's Yard and Little Dean's Yard, with Town boys ceremonially opposing the carrying, and creating a scuffle under the raised chair; the ceremony was abolished after Otter's chairing.

In 1874, he went up to Christ Church, Oxford, as a junior student, also taking a pupillage at Lincoln's Inn in 1876; he took a first in Honour Moderations in 1878.

== Sporting career ==
Otter was something of a prodigy at football; he made his debut in association football for Westminster School against Upton Park at Vincent Square on 22 October 1870, when he was not yet 15 years old. Four days later he scored his first goal, the fourth in a 4–0 win over West Kent, after scrimmages before the Kentish posts. However he missed much of the 1871–72 season through illness.

However, for the 1873–74 season he was chosen as captain. He also appeared as a guest player for Barnes in a handful of matches, the first being a defeat at the Royal Engineers in October, and played for the Wanderers, debuting for the famous club in a win over Gitanos in November.

One month later, he made his FA Cup debut, playing for Wanderers against Oxford University, although unusually as a full-back. The match ended in a draw and he was moved up front for the replay at the University Parks, but a weakened Wanderers went down 1–0.

He made his representative debut for the Middlesex county side against Surrey at the Kennington Oval in January 1874, and scored the final Middlesex goal with a cross-shot in a 4–2 win.

For the 1874–75 FA Cup, his loyalties switched to his university, and scored the decisive second goal in the third round win over the Wanderers. He was also now able to play in the Varsity match against Cambridge University, which he did twice; the first time in the autumn 1874 match, which went Cambridge's way (although Otter was singled out for the quality of his play), and the second time in November 1875, which Oxford won 4–1, Otter scoring the first goal, shortly after which injury reduced Oxford to 10 men.

He remained a regular in the Oxford side until the 1877–78 FA Cup, and demonstrated "clever" dribbling in the 1877 FA Cup final, despite which the university lost to the Wanderers. His final match of note was for the Wanderers in their closing match of the 1877–78 season, against the Vale of Leven at the Oval, the game ending 3–1 to the visitors.

Otter was also a noted athlete, finishing second in the Varsity athletics hammer throw in 1878 with a throw of 98' 10".

== Post-university ==
Otter joined the Indian Civil Service in 1878, being sent out as an assistant to the magistrate of Tinnevelly in the Madras Presidency. He returned to England in 1879, suffering from dysentery, of which he died at the end of that year.
