= John Owen (footballer) =

English footballer and educator

John Robert Blayney Owen (25 May 1848 – 13 June 1921) was the head teacher at Trent College, who earlier in his life was a promising footballer who made one appearance for England in 1874.

== Football career ==
Owen was born in St Leonards, Buckinghamshire and educated at Queen's College, Oxford where he played football for Oxford University. While at Trent College he joined the Sheffield club.

He made his solitary England appearance on 7 March 1874 against Scotland, playing as an outside forward. After "a most competitive game", Scotland won 2–1, with Robert Kingsford scoring England's goal in the 22nd minute, before the Scots scored twice.

He was described as being "very fast and a great goal-getter" by Charles Alcock's Football Annual for 1875. However, it also criticised him for being "too much used to be played for, and hardly does himself justice".

He also played representative football for the Sheffield F.A. and for Nottinghamshire.

== Teaching and church career ==
On leaving university, he took up a teaching position as second master at Trent College in Long Eaton, Derbyshire from 1871 to 1881. He was ordained in 1876.

He then became master of Hawkshead Grammar School from 1881 to 1883, before returning to Trent College in 1883 to take up the post of headmaster, where he remained until 1890.

He then left teaching and became the vicar of Toftrees in Norfolk until 1905, finally serving as rector of Bradwell-on-Sea in Essex until his death in 1921.
