= John Bain (footballer, born 1854) =

English footballer

John Bain (15 July 1854 – 7 August 1929) was an amateur footballer who appeared for Oxford University in the 1877 FA Cup Final. Born in Scotland, he made one appearance for England in 1877.

== Career ==
Bain was born in Bothwell, Lanarkshire to Scottish parents Joseph Bain and Charlotte Piper, and was educated at Sherborne School and Winchester College before going up to New College, Oxford. At Oxford, he earned his blue in 1876. The following year he helped the university football team to reach the final of the FA Cup.

Three weeks prior to the Cup Final he was one of seven debutants in the England team to play Scotland at the Kennington Oval on 3 March 1877. According to Philip Gibbons, in the 1870s the England side "tended to be chosen on availability rather than skill alone" The change in the England line-up made little difference to England's performance against the Scots who won the game 3–1, with England's consolation goal coming from Alfred Lyttelton; the Scots thus inflicted England's first international defeat on home soil in the sixth appearance between the two countries. Bain, having been born in Scotland, became the first Scottish-born player to represent England. Bain, along with four of the international debutants, was never selected again for international honours.

In the 1877 FA Cup Final, played at the Oval on 24 March, Oxford University met the Wanderers, who were the cup holders. Wanderers won the game after extra time 2–1 with goals from William Lindsay and Jarvis Kenrick, with Arthur Kinnaird conceding an own goal for Oxford University's solitary goal. In the cup final, Bain played at his normal position at half-back, whereas he had played as a forward for England.

After leaving university, Bain qualified as a barrister and was called to the Bar in 1880. By now, he was a teacher at Marlborough College having been appointed in 1879 and remained in this office until 1883, returning in 1886 until his retirement in 1913.

== Sporting honours ==
Oxford University

- FA Cup finalist: 1877

== See also ==
- List of England international footballers born outside England
