= Monkmoor =

Suburb of Shrewsbury, Shropshire, England

Coordinates: 52.715759°N 2.7294374°W

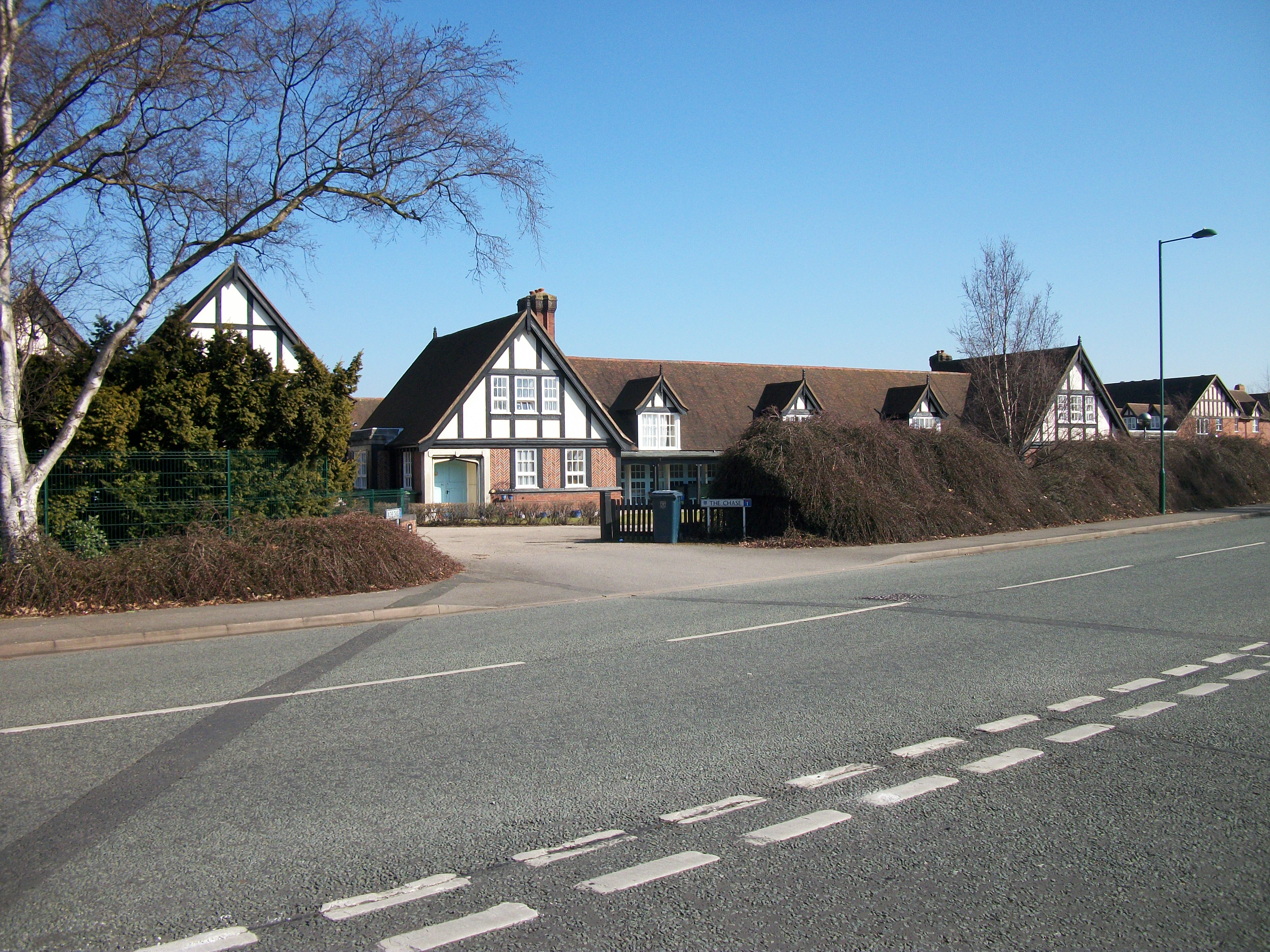
- Former Monkmoor Girls' School

- Location within Shropshire
- Population: 4,451 (2015 ward)
- OS grid reference: SJ508133
- Unitary authority: Shropshire
- Ceremonial county: Shropshire
- Region: West Midlands
- Country: England
- Sovereign state: United Kingdom
- Post town: Shrewsbury
- Postcode district: SY2
- Dialling code: 01743
- Police: West Mercia
- Fire: Shropshire
- Ambulance: West Midlands
- UK Parliament: Shrewsbury and Atcham

Monkmoor is a suburb located in the north-east of the town of Shrewsbury, Shropshire, England. It is connected to the suburbs of Underdale and Abbey Foregate. The ward's population in 2015 was 4,451. Much of Monkmoor is residential; there is approximately 1,904 households in the suburb and 1,939 total dwellings.

== Amenities ==
The suburb has two public houses, The Monkmoor and The Abbey, named after the nearby Shrewsbury Abbey. It also has a post office, a Church of England church (St Peter's) and a Roman Catholic one (St Winefride's), a chip shop, an Indian and Chinese takeaway and a convenience store. It is also home to Shrewsbury Police Station.

There is a primary school, The Wilfred Owen School (opened 2008), and a specialist academy known as Severndale Academy. There was formerly a secondary Monkmoor Girls' School in the suburb, however it closed in the 20th century and is now a listed building, converted to housing.

=== Sport ===
To the rear of the former school is Monkmoor Recreation Ground, a large recreation ground with football, rugby and tennis facilities.

Shrewsbury Town F.C. had their first ground on the former Racecourse Ground in Monkmoor, where they hosted 51 matches over 3 years (1886–89).

On 8 February, 1890 the Wales football team faced Ireland in a British Championship match, winning 5-2. Shrewsbury Town players Sam Gillam and Jack Bowdler played for Wales in the match.

As a BMX track is situated near the back of local primary school Belvidere Primary.

== Notable people ==
- Samuel Butler (1774–1839), headmaster of Shrewsbury School, later Bishop of Lichfield, bought the mansion called Whitehall on Monkmoor Road as retirement home in 1834.
- Thomas Bucknall Lloyd (1824–1896), Archdeacon of Salop, had family home at Whitehall, which he bought from his cousin, the novelist Samuel Butler (1835–1902), Bishop Samuel Butler's grandson, in 1857.
- George Butler Lloyd (1854–1930), local Conservative MP for Shrewsbury 1913–22, was born at now-demolished Monkmoor Hall.
- Wilfred Owen (1893–1918), war poet, lived in family home at 71 Monkmoor Road (house named 'Mahim'), where there is a commemorative plaque. The local primary school, The Wilfred Owen, was named for him.

== Transport ==
The Wolverhampton–Shrewsbury line runs through the suburb under a road bridge, and Shrewsbury railway station is located 1.2 miles to the west of Monkmoor. The suburb is served by the 1 bus route. The route connects the suburb to Shrewsbury town centre.

Bus services in Monkmoor
Bus operator	Line	Destination(s)	Notes
Arriva Midland North	1	Shrewsbury Bus Station → Abbey Foregate → Monkmoor → Telford Estate	Monday-Saturday only.

== See also ==
- Abbey Foregate
- Underdale, Shrewsbury
