= Reigate Priory F.C. =

Association football club in England

Coordinates: 51°14′16″N 0°12′56″W

Reigate Priory
- Full name: Reigate Priory Football Club
- Nickname: Priory
- Founded: 1870
- Ground: Park Lane, Reigate New Defence Horley
- Capacity: 1800 (101 seated)
- Chairman: Ray Connolly
- Manager: Dale Wyatt
- League: Southern Combination Division One
- 2025–26: Southern Combination Division One, 2nd of 18
Home colours	Away colours

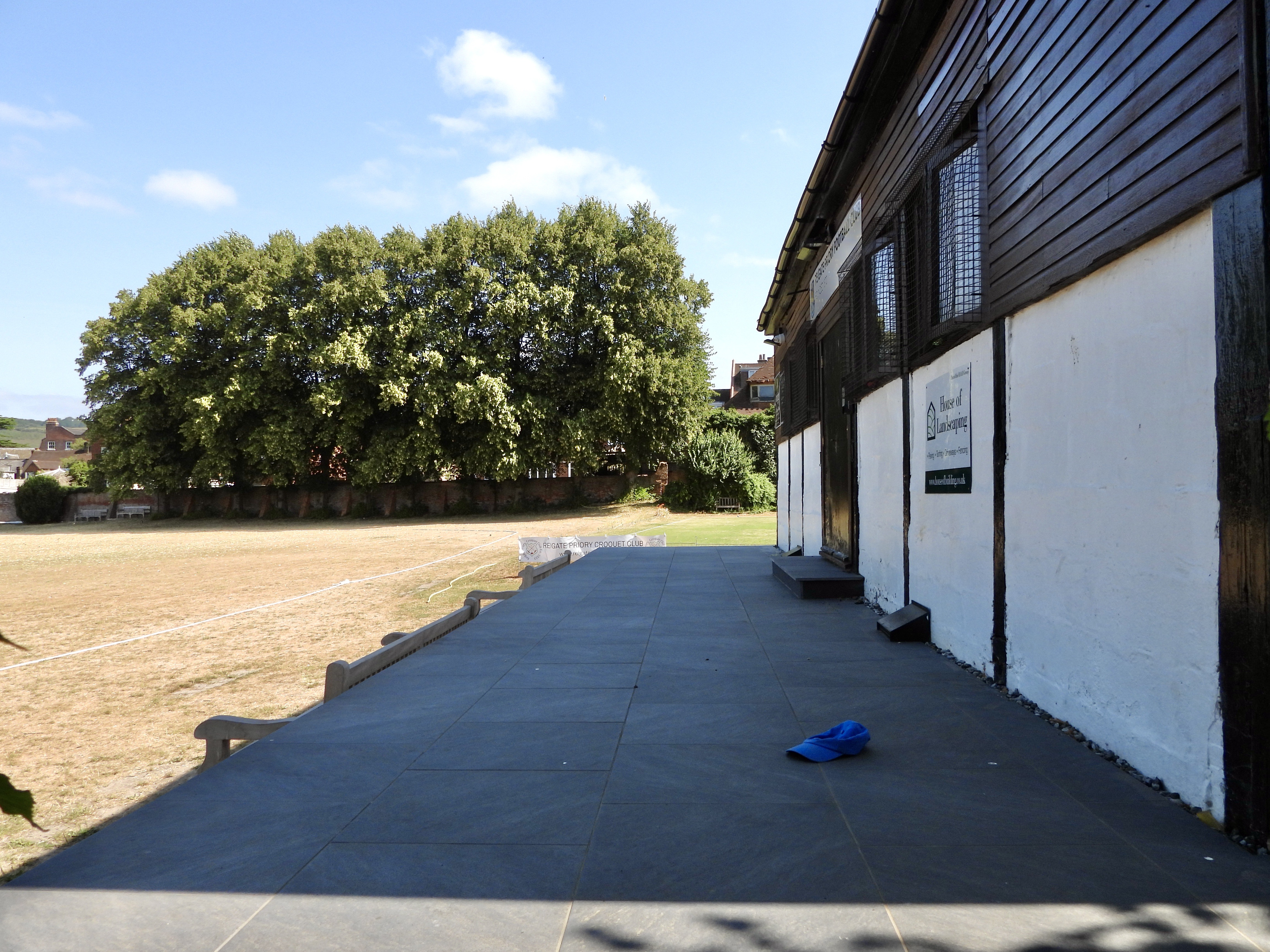
The clubhouse at the Park Lane ground

Reigate Priory Football Club is a semi-professional football club based in Reigate, Surrey, England. They are currently members of Southern Combination Division One.

== History ==
The club can trace its history as far back as April 1870, not long after The Football Association was formed in 1863; it became a member of the Football Association the same year.

In 1871 the club was one of only 15 teams that played for a £20 silver trophy, the first ever FA Challenge Cup competition; the club's share was £1 1s, and the club made 2/6 profit over the season thanks to £6 2/6 worth of income. The team were drawn in the first round against the Royal Engineers, who went on to lose in the final. Reigate Priory withdrew before the game, and Royal Engineers were awarded a walkover.

Reigate Priory was also present when the Surrey County F.A. (founded in 1877) decided to become affiliated to the Football Association on 16 March 1882. The club was one of the original 10 teams present at the meeting that took place in Guildford. At the same time, a County Senior Cup competition was introduced. The first winners of this trophy, Priory were victorious six times in the competition before the end of the 19th century.

The club is one of the oldest football clubs in the world still playing on its original ground. It numbers among its former members WW Read, with whom it enjoyed a long and happy association right through his sporting life.

In 2008 the club became founder members of the Surrey Elite Intermediate League and in the 2023-24 season the club was promoted to the Southern Combination Football League Division One (tier six of the football "pyramid"), marking a new high for the club. In the 2025–26 Southern Combination Football League the club finished 2nd in the behind Godalming Town but lost in the promotion playoff.

== Colours ==
The club's colours are dark blue and brown. Its original colours were white jerseys and knickerbockers, with dark blue socks and cap. It retained white shirts (with blue trim) untl after the Second World War and adopted black knickers in 1968, which scheme it retained until 1997.

== Ground ==
The club's traditional ground is the cricket ground at Park Lane, Reigate, which the club has used since its foundation. The club's junior and reserve teams use Park Lane while the first team has to use a ground with the appropriate Combination licence, which since 2024 has been Horley Town's New Defence.

== Honours ==
- Surrey Senior Cup:
  - Winners (6): 1882–83, 1885–86, 1890–91, 1891–92, 1893–94, 1896–97
  - Runners-up (4): 1883–84, 1884–85, 1886–87, 1889–90
- Redhill and District Sunday Senior Cup:
  - Runners-up (1): 2014–15
- Challenge International du Nord:

Winners (1): 1910

- Gray Hooper Holt LLP Mid Sussex Championship

Winners (1): 2021–22

- Gray Hooper Holt LLP Mid Sussex Stubbins Cup

Winners (1): 2021–22

- 'Surrey FA U18 Youth Cup’

Winners (1) : 2024-25 Tooting & Mitcham 0 RPFC 1

== Records ==
- FA Cup
  - Second Round 1874–75, 1875–76
- FA Vase
  - First Round 1974–75, 1975–76, 1977–78,
  - First Round Qualifying 2024-25
  - Second Round Qualifying 2025-26
  - Second Round Qualifying 2026-27
