= 105th Regiment F.C. =

Former association football club in England

- Full name: 105th Regiment Football Club
- Nickname: Light Bobs
- Founded: 1874
- Dissolved: 1881
- Ground: regimental barracks
- Secretary: Lt. F. C. Cooper
Home colours

105th Regiment Football Club (also known as the 103rd Light Infantry) was an English association football club in the 19th century, made up of soldiers with the 105th Regiment of Foot (Madras Light Infantry).

== History ==
The club's first match was in 1874 under the Sheffield rules as the regiment was stationed in Sheffield at the time; however the club adopted association laws the same season.

It competed in some of the first stagings of the Football Association Challenge Cup, entering the competition between 1875 and 1878, winning one tie. Unlike the Royal Engineers, the Light Bobs allowed "other ranks" to represent the regiment, and the scorers in its 3–0 win over the 1st Surrey Rifles in the 1876–77 FA Cup included a Private Morris and Lance Corporal Ford.

The club remained a member of the Football Association until 1880, but a merger in 1881 into the King's Own Yorkshire Light Infantry ended the club's existence.

== Seasons ==
=== 1875–76 ===
6 November 1875

105th Regiment	0 – 0	Crystal Palace

Aldershot barracks
Attendance: 500
20 November 1875

Crystal Palace	3 – 0	105th Regiment

Kennington Oval
Attendance: 1,578

=== 1876–77 ===
11 November 1876

105th Regiment	3 – 0	1st Surrey Rifles

Colchester barracks
Attendance: 500
Referee: Osmond Orpen (Colchester Town F.C.)
14 December 1876

Oxford University	6 – 1	105th Regiment

Oxford University
Attendance: 1,204

=== 1877–78 ===
7 November 1877

105th Regiment	0 – 2	Old Harrovians

Colchester barracks

=== 1878–79 ===
Minerva	w/o	105th Regiment

== Colours ==
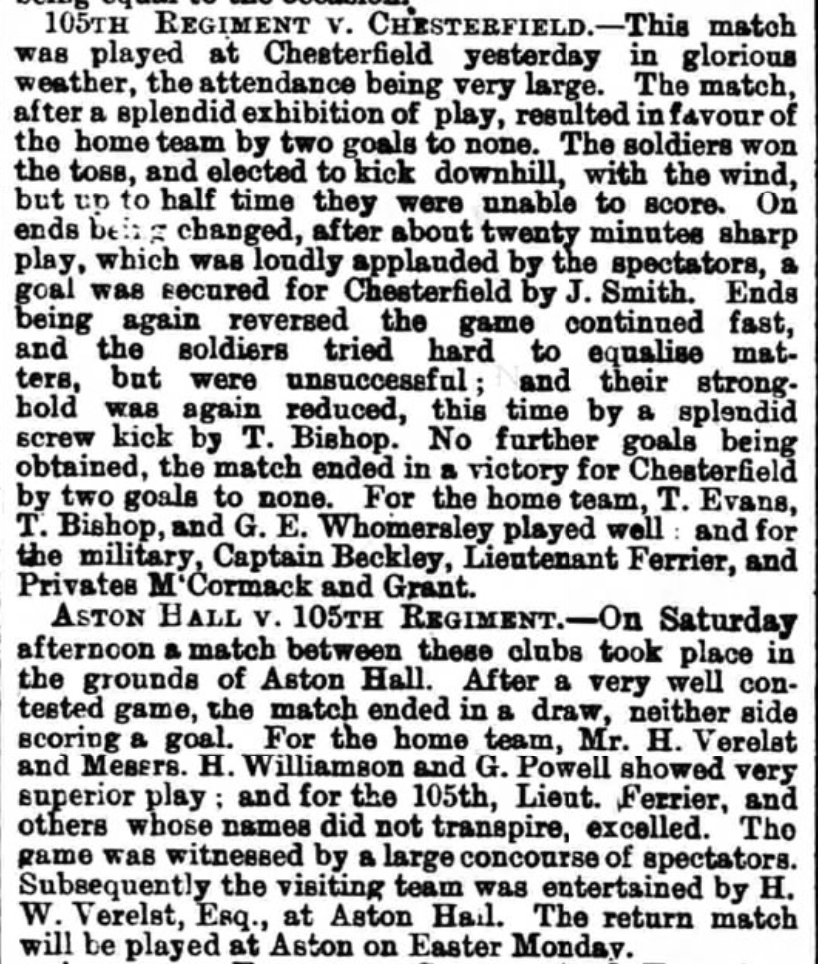
Two football matches for the 105th Regiment, against Chesterfield and a side from Aston Hall, Yorkshire: Sheffield Independent, 16 March 1875

The club wore red and buff "stripes", which, at the time, referred to hoops.

== Ground ==
The club played its home matches at its barracks, wherever it was based:

- 1874–75: Sheffield
- 1875–76: Aldershot
- 1876–78: Colchester
