= Marlow F.C. =

Association football club in England

Coordinates: 51°34′37″N 0°46′26″W

Marlow
- Full name: Marlow Football Club
- Nickname: The Blues
- Founded: 22 November 1870
- Ground: Alfred Davis Memorial Ground, Marlow
- Capacity: 3,000 (250 seated)
- Chairman: Ian Benfell
- Manager: Mark Bartley
- League: Southern League Division One Central
- 2025–26: Southern League Division One Central, 14th of 22
- Website: https://www.marlowfc.co.uk
Home colours	Away colours

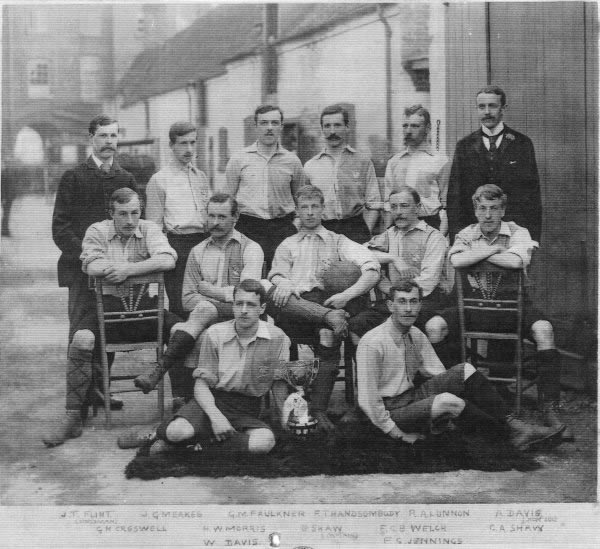
The Marlow team of 1894

Marlow Football Club is a football club based in Marlow, Buckinghamshire, England. They are currently members of the Southern League Division One Central and play at the Alfred Davis Memorial Ground. Marlow are the only football club in England to have applied for entry into the FA Cup every season since its inception in 1871.

== History ==
The club was formed as the Great Marlow Football Club at a meeting at the Compleat Angler Hotel on 22 November 1870. Mr. J. Crossman was elected captain. The team's first practice session took place on 6 December 1870 with its first recorded game being played at Marlow against Windsor Home Park on 26 January 1871. In 1871–72 they competed in the first edition of the FA Cup, losing 2–0 to Maidenhead in the first round; one of their players was Cuthbert Ottoway, who went on to captain England in their match against Scotland the following year, the first-ever recognised football international. Another early player, and club captain in the 1870s, Sydney Wright, refereed the 1877 FA Cup final. In 1881–82 the club reached the FA Cup semi-finals, losing 5–0 to Old Etonians. They joined the Western Section of the Spartan League in 1908. However, the club resigned midway through the 1910–11 season.

Marlow joined the Great Western Suburban League for the 1911–12 season. They finished bottom of the league in 1912–13 following a points deduction, and again in 1922–23. In 1924 they left the league, dropping into the Reading & District League. After moving to the Alfred Davis Memorial Ground in 1928, the club joined Division Two West of the Spartan League. They won the division in 1929–30, earning promotion to Division One. In 1937–38 the club were Division One champions and were promoted to the Premier Division. During World War II the club played in the Great Western Combination. After the war they were placed in the Western Division of the Spartan League for the 1945–46 season, but did not finish high enough to earn a place in the Premier Division the following season.

In 1951 Marlow returned to the Spartan League's Premier Division, where they remained until joining Division Two of the Athenian League in 1965. The club were promoted to Division One after finishing third in the division in 1970–71. When the Athenian League was disbanded in 1984, they joined Division Two North of the Isthmian League. The club were transferred to Division Two South the following season, and in 1986–87 they finished second and were promoted to Division One. The following season saw them win the Division One title, earning promotion to the Premier Division. In 1991–92 the club reached the first round of the FA Cup for the first time since 1892, but lost 6–0 to West Bromwich Albion.

The following season saw Marlow reach the third round of the FA Cup after beating Salisbury and VS Rugby in the first two rounds. They were drawn at home to Tottenham, but the match was switched to White Hart Lane, where they lost 5–1. Two seasons later they reached the third round again, defeating Oxford United in the first round, before losing 2–0 at Swindon Town in the third. The club remained in the Isthmian League's Premier Division until being relegated at the end of the 1994–95 season. Two seasons later they were relegated again. In 2004 they were transferred to Division One West of the Southern League, and were later transferred to Division One Central. In 2011–12 the club finished bottom of Division One Central of the Southern League and were relegated to the Premier Division of the Hellenic League.

Marlow won the Hellenic League Premier Division at the first attempt, earning promotion back to Division One Central of the Southern League. They were subsequently transferred to Division One South & West for the 2015–16 season, before returning to Division One Central the following year. In 2016–17 the club finished fourth in Division One Central, qualifying for the promotion play-offs, going on to lose 2–0 to Barton Rovers in the semi-finals. At the end of the 2017–18 season the club were transferred to the South Central Division of the Isthmian League. In 2023–24 they were runners-up in the South Central Division, before beating Westfield 3–2 the play-off semi-finals and then winning the final against Leatherhead 3–1 to earn promotion to the Premier Division South of the Southern League.

In 2024–25 Marlow finished bottom of the Premier Division South and were relegated to Division One Central.

== Ground ==
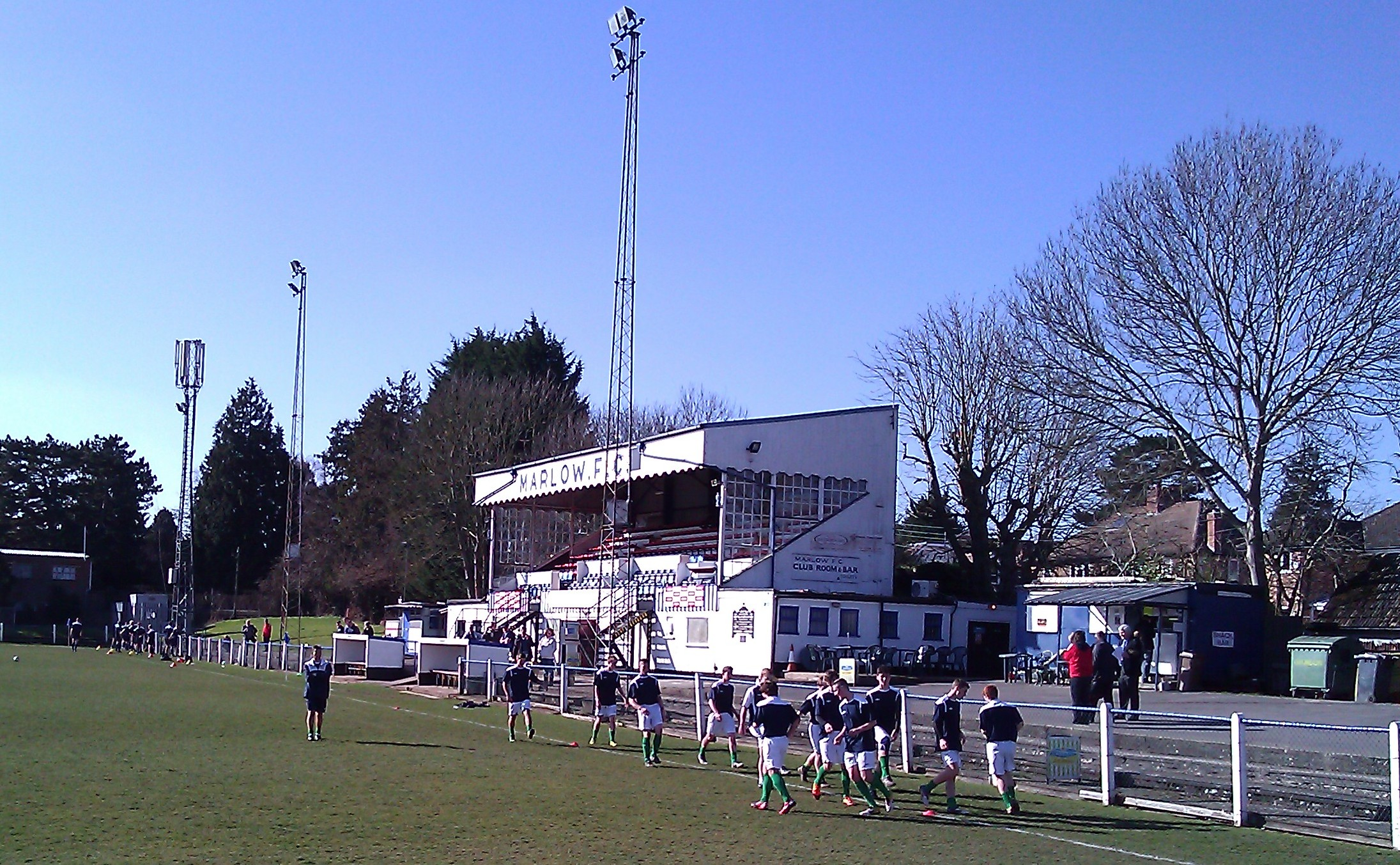
The main stand at the Alfred Davis Memorial Ground

The club played at Aldermeadow until 1898, when they moved to Crown Meadow, now known as the Riley Recreational Ground. They were forced to relocate to Star Meadow in 1919; the ground was unenclosed and the club had to eventually drop into the Reading & District League. In 1928 they moved to the Alfred Davis Memorial Ground, named after their long-serving secretary who had died in 1924. A wooden grandstand was built on one side of the pitch in 1930, with a covered area erected on the Green Verges side in 1950. The Green Verges stand was replaced during the 1990s. Terracing was installed on all four sides in 1985, and another covered stand was built at the Trinity End in 1991.

== Honours ==
- Isthmian League
  - Division One champions 1987–88
- Spartan League
  - Division One champions 1937–38
  - Division Two West champions 1929–30
- Hellenic League
  - Premier Division champions 2012–13
- Berks & Bucks Senior Cup
  - Winners 1990–91, 1993–94

== Records ==
- Best FA Cup performance: Semi-finals, 1881–82
- Best FA Amateur Cup performance: Semi-finals, 1896–97, 1899–1900
- Best FA Trophy performance: Fourth round, 2003–04
- Best FA Vase performance: Fifth round, 1974–75, 2000–01
- Record attendance: 3,000 vs Oxford United, FA Cup first round, 1994
- Most appearances: Mick McKeown, over 500
- Most goals: Kevin Stone
- Record transfer fee received: £8,000 for David Lay from Slough Town
- Record transfer fee paid: £5,000 for Richard Evans to Sutton United

== See also ==
- Marlow F.C. players
- Marlow F.C. managers
