= Old Philberdians F.C. =

Old Philberdians
- Full name: Old Philberdians Football Club
- Nicknames: the Black and White
- Founded: 1875; 150 years ago
- Dissolved: 1889; 136 years ago
- Ground: school grounds, Holyport, Maidenhead
Home colours

The Old Philberdians Football Club was an association football club made up of the old boys and masters of The Philberds school, from Holyport, near Maidenhead, Berkshire.

== History ==
The club's first such recorded match was a 0–0 draw in a 12-a-side match against Maidenhead in April 1875, the school's founder, the Rev. Henry Price, being a regular player and captain. By 1877–78 the Old Philberdians were playing regularly against teams in the Berkshire area, and the club was strong enough to beat the established teams of Marlow and the Remnants.

In 1879–80, the club reached the final of the Berkshire & Buckinghamshire Senior Cup, having beaten Maidenhead away 7–0 en route. Following two draws with the Swifts (in Maidenhead and at South Reading's Whitley Park), the clubs shared the trophy and each XI received winners' medals, there not being enough time left in the season to play another replay.

The club was one of the first fifteen members of the Berkshire and Buckinghamshire Football Association and in 1880–81 entered the FA Cup for the only time. The club withdrew when drawn away to Pilgrims; three of the club’s key players (the Wild brothers and Arnott) played instead for the Swifts.

Following that season, the club did not play competitively on either the local or national stage, although it remained a member of the local association until 1887; in part this was due to the school masters forming their own club, which solely played friendly matches. Old Philberdians continued until at least 1889, with annual matches against Guy’s Hospital.

== Colours ==
The club played in black and white jerseys.

== Ground ==
The club played in the school grounds.
