= Reading Minster F.C. =

Defunct football club in England

Reading Minster
- Full name: Reading Minster F.C.
- Nickname(s): the Minsters
- Founded: 1874
- Dissolved: 1896?
- Ground: Prospect Park
Probable colours

Reading Minster was an English association football club based in Reading.

== History ==
The club was founded in 1874, with the Rev. C. C. Mackarness - a scorer in the 1874 FA Cup final for Oxford University A.F.C. - as the first club captain, and the club remained as a religious-based institution through its existence. The club played in the Berks & Bucks Senior Cup in 1878–79, losing to the Remnants, in part because of the club's quixotic policy - soon abandoned - of rotating players around the pitch so everyone took a turn in goal.

The club first entered the FA Cup in 1880–81. In the first round, the club drew 1–1 with Romford at a neutral ground in Ealing. The club scratched from the competition before the replay could take place.

The club's best run in the competition was in the following season. The club beat Windsor Home Park at home in controversial circumstances; the Reading Observer reporting that Minster had won 1–0, with a disputed goal against which Home Park had made a protest, and the Windsor newspapers reporting the score as being 0–0. The Football Association rejected the protest.

In the second round, Minster beat Romford, again in controversial circumstances; Minster took the lead when Romford stopped playing, because of an apparent offside, and late in the match, when Earle of Romford was brought down, "a foul was claimed for this, and being allowed by one of the umpires, one of the Romford men picked up the ball for the purpose of passing it back to where the foul took place, but the referee gave “hands” to the home team." Romford considered a protest but did not file one.

In the third round, the club played the Hotspur club of Battersea, who had beaten Reading Abbey in the second round, but lost in a replay at Prospect Park to two late goals.

The club entered the FA Cup until 1884–85, albeit the club scratched in 1882–83 having been given a walkover in round 1, and the club's worst performance came in a 10–1 defeat to the Old Carthusians in 1883, played for the occasion in the grounds of Park House in Reading, owned by Reading F.C. member A.C. Bartholomew.

The club was always in the shadow of other local clubs, such as Reading and South Reading F.C., and it never reached the final of the local FA's competition. However it did win the Reading Challenge Cup in 1883–84, beating surprise finalists Caversham 2–1 at Coley Park. It retained the trophy in 1884–85, beating South Reading in the semi-final, "much to the evident delight of their supporters, and the evident astonishment of not a few of their opponents."

The final recorded match of the club was a 6–0 defeat at Maidenhead United in December 1895; even in this final match the club still featured an ecclesiastical in the line-up (the Rev. C. A. Sturges-Jones as centre-forward). The club's members put their resources instead behind the newly-formed Reading Amateur.

== Colours ==
There is no currently known record of the club's precise colours, but in 1884 the club decided to add a white band (from right shoulder to left hip) to distinguish it from other clubs in the area which had similar colours. Given that red and green were not popular colours, and no local club wore blue on its own, but Swifts and South Reading wore black, it is probable that Minster also wore black jerseys beforehand.

== Ground ==
The club played at Prospect Park.

== Notable players ==
- Charles Mackarness, the club's first captain
