= Windsor F.C. (1882) =

Defunct football club in England

Windsor
- Full name: Windsor F.C.
- Founded: 1882
- Dissolved: 1890
- Ground: Windsor Home Park
Home colours

Windsor Football Club was an English association football club based in Berkshire. The club was founded in September 1882 as a merger between the Windsor Home Park and Grosvenor clubs.

== History ==
The club entered the FA Cup three times in the 1880s, its best run coming in its first entry, in 1882–83, reaching the third round. Although the club had been drawn at home to the Clapham Rovers, the tie was played at the St Mark's College ground, probably because Home Park was waterlogged.

The club's final entry in 1884–85 ended in withdrawal, after being drawn away at Chatham, although the club was more successful at local level. Windsor won the Berks & Bucks Senior Cup twice; in 1884 beating South Reading 6–2 after an initial drawn match, and beating the same opponents 2–0 in 1887.

In 1888 Prince Albert of Schleswig-Holstein was elected as a club member. However, the club does not seem to have played after the Senior Cup final in 1890, which it lost to Marlow after a "clinker" of a shot from Shaw was fumbled over the line by goalkeeper Husted. The last record of Windsor is its withdrawal in favour of Windsor Phœnix in the 1890–91 competition, and five of the 1890 final line-up were playing for Phœnix in the 1890–91 season. Phœnix would merge into the new Windsor & Eton club.

== Colours ==
The club listed its colours as chocolate and light blue, probably in halves as that was a popular design for the colours.

== Ground ==
The club played at Windsor Home Park.

== Honours ==
FA Cup

- Best performance: 1882-83: 3rd Round (last 25)

Berks & Bucks Senior Cup

- Winners: 1883–84, 1886–87
- Runners-up: 1884–85
