= Chesham Generals F.C. =

Defunct English football club

- Full name: Chesham Generals Football Club
- Nickname(s): the Generals
- Founded: 1887
- Dissolved: 1917
- Ground: Bellingdon Road
- President: Sir Arthur Liberty
Home colours

Chesham Generals Football Club was an English football club from Chesham, Buckinghamshire.

== History ==
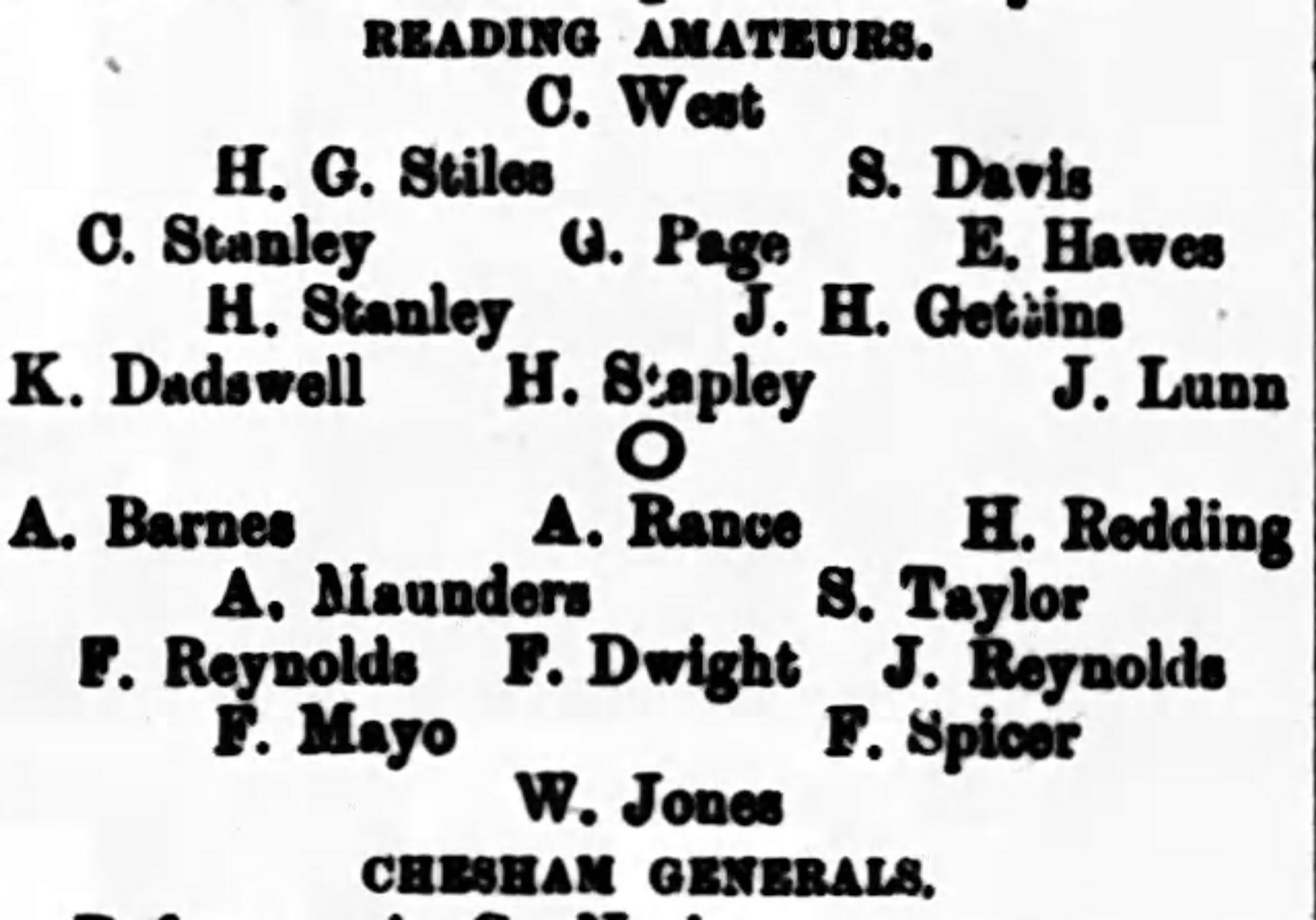
Line-ups for the 1904–05 Berks & Bucks Senior Cup final, Reading Amateur v Chesham Generals, Bucks Examiner, 28 April 1905

The club was founded in 1887 by the Young Men's Mutual Improvement Class of the General Baptist Chapel (at Broadway Baptist Church in Chesham), originally as a cricket and football club, the football side being known as the Chesham General Baptist Football Club. In 1890 it adopted the shorter Chesham Generals name and opened up its membership to those outside the church. Unlike its cross-town rival Chesham Town, the Generals remained resolutely amateur.

The club's first honour was winning the Berks & Bucks Senior Cup in 1900–01, beating surprise finalists Stantonbury St James in the final at Maidenhead. The Saints had won the Junior Cup the previous season and were not given a chance in the Senior, but startled the Generals by taking the lead inside three minutes. The shock did not last long as goals from Fred Pheby, Tom White, and a suspiciously offside Reynolds put the Generals 3–1 up at the break, and further goals from Redding and Pheby secured the title.

The Generals also reached the final in 1904–05, at Loakes Park, but it conceded two goals in ten minutes to Reading Amateur, and went down 3–2.

It was a regular entrant to the FA Cup and FA Amateur Cup qualifying rounds in the pre-First World War period. The Generals reached the fourth qualifying round (equivalent of the first round today) of the former in 1900–01 and 1902–03, but its best run in the Amateur Cup was as far as the last 8 in 1897–98. At that stage it lost 4–2 to the Old Malvernians.

The club's first league football came in 1898, in the Bucks and Contiguous League; the club left for the London Football League in 1900, but, after the fixture lists were arranged, the other clubs in the League had a change of heart, and voted the Generals back out - although they did fulfil most of the fixtures. In 1901–02 the club was a founder member of the South-Eastern League, in which it remained until 1908–09, continuously with playing in the Bucks League, winning the latter in 1902–03 and 1903–04. In 1909–10, the club joined the higher status Spartan League, and although it finished bottom in its first season, it won the title in 1913–14, one of a trio of trophies won in the season (alongside the Bucks Charity and Chesham Charity Cups).

In 1917 the club merged with Chesham Town to form Chesham United, which is still in existence. The £104 of club assets which remained after the merger was handed to Chesham Hospital.

== Colours ==
The club wore blue and white striped shirts, black shorts, and black socks with white trim.

== Ground ==
The club had a nomadic existence in its early days, originally playing at Top Park, and then spending two seasons at Portobello Farm, before moving to Bellingdon Road, and in 1892 left for the New Town Ground, on the Brockhurst Estate, alongside Berkhamsted Road; however in 1912 the ground was sold off for housing, and the club pre-empted homelessness by moving back to Bellingdon Road beforehand.

== Notable players ==
- Brothers Tom and Charlie White, who played for the club in the 1900s
