= Reading Amateur F.C. =

Defunct football club in England

- Full name: Reading Amateur Football Club
- Nickname(s): the Amateurs
- Founded: 1895
- Dissolved: 1914
- Ground: Sports Ground
19th century colours	20th century colours

Reading Amateur F.C. was an association football club from Reading, Berkshire, active before the First World War.

== History ==
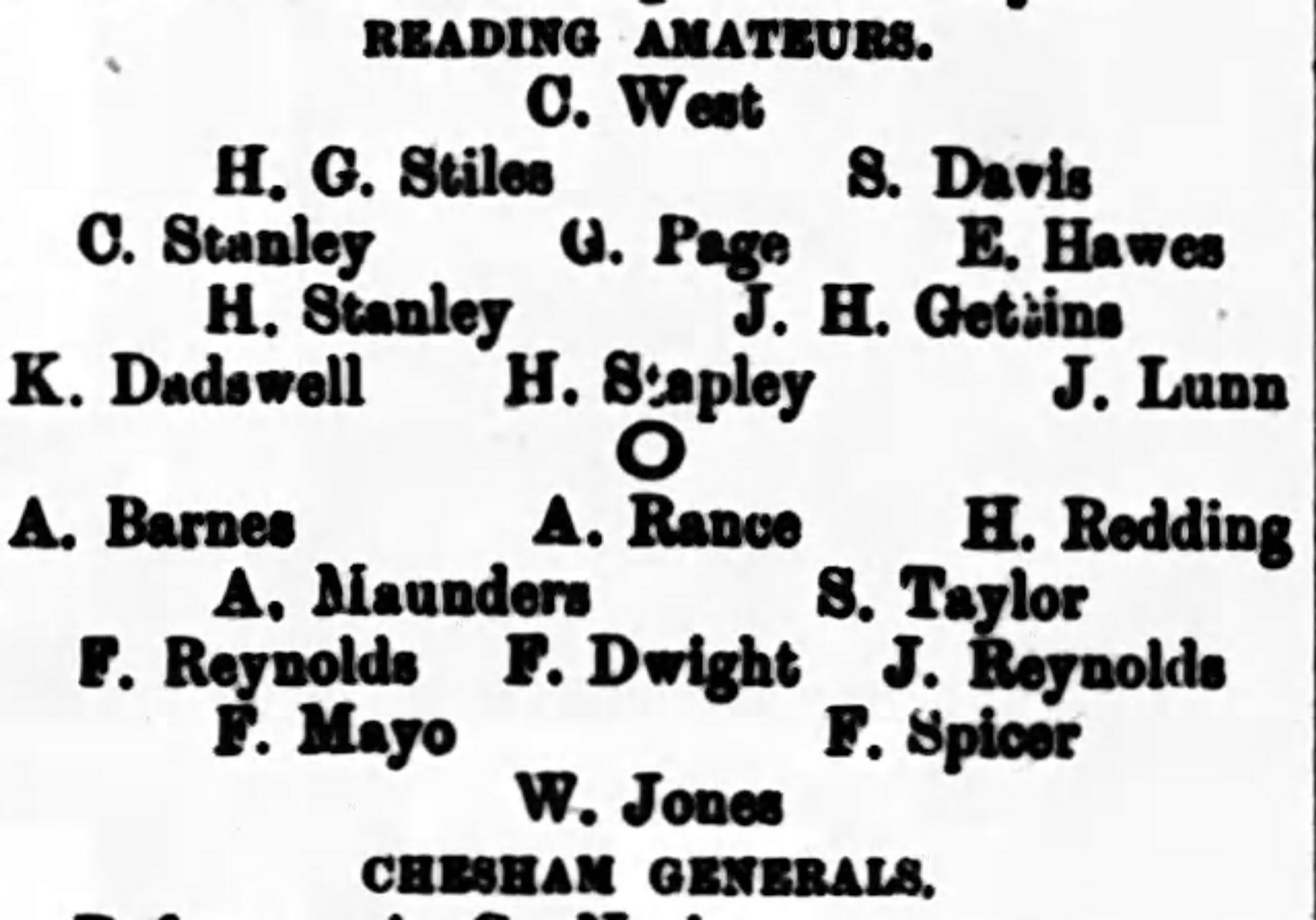
Line-ups for the 1904–05 Berks & Bucks Senior Cup final, Reading Amateur v Chesham Generals, Bucks Examiner, 28 April 1905

The club was founded on 13 June 1895 at the Queen's Hotel as a reaction to Reading F.C. deciding to turn professional; the newly-professional side was rumoured to be objecting to Football Association membership for the amateur club on the basis of a similarity of names. The initial meeting included a number of personnel associated with Reading Minster F.C. and the new side effectively took over the role of the Minsters. The club's official name was Reading Amateur (i.e. singular, referring to the club), but the media often referred to the club as Reading Amateurs.

The club entered the FA Amateur Cup from 1895–96 to 1910–11, its best runs being to the first round proper (last 64) in 1907–08 and 1908–09 - its best achievement being to hold Wycombe Wanderers to a draw on the former occasion, going down 5–3 in a replay. It also tried its luck in the FA Cup qualifying rounds from 1903–04 until 1908–09, but only ever won one match, 4–2 at Slough in 1904–05.

The club's greatest honours came in the Berks & Bucks Senior Cup, the leading local competition at the time. It reached the final for three years in a row (from 1903–04 to 1905–06), losing to Chesham Town in a replay in its first final, but winning the other two. In 1904–05, it beat Chesham Generals at Loakes Park, two goals in the first ten minutes setting the club on to a 3–2 win; and in 1905–06 the Amateurs beat Maidenhead Norfolkians 4–0, aided by a Norfolkian player being ordered off for striking a spectator.

The club joined the Amateur Football Association in September 1909, which caused it to scratch to Yiewsley in the FA Cup. It went into abeyance in 1914 as so many of its players were on active service, and it did not re-emerge after the war. Before the 1921–22 season, Reading United was given permission to change its name to Reading Amateurs, and it won two ties in the 1921–22 FA Cup qualifying rounds, but amidst confusion as to whether the Amateurs club was a replacement rather than a re-naming, the renewed push for amateurism in Reading did not last more than two seasons; the last recorded match taking place in 1923.

== Colours ==
The club's colours on formation were claret and gold. The club changed to black shirts with a shield in 1899, originally with white shorts, and in 1908 it changed the shorts to navy or black. It retained black until at least 1912. The club's devotees, in a nod to the town's industry, sometimes wore biscuits in their hatbands.

== Ground ==
The club played at the Reading Sports Ground.
