= St Mark's F.C. (Windsor) =

St Mark's
- Full name: St Mark's F.C. (Windsor)
- Founded: 1876
- Dissolved: 1888
- Ground: St Mark's School, Windsor
Home colours

St Mark's F.C. was an English association club based in Windsor.

== History ==
The first recorded match for the club was on 18 November 1876, a 2–1 home defeat to Runnymede. Its players were pupils and masters attending St Mark's School, under the headmastership of the Reverend E. Hawtrey, whose sons played for the club. The school later became the Imperial Service College.

It entered the FA Cup once, in 1877–78 and was drawn to play Barnes, with choice of ground, but scratched before playing. This appears to be because a number of its players had pledged their allegiance to other clubs in the Windsor and Slough area, including Swifts and Remnants; the latter club was made up solely of masters from the school.

The club provided three players to the Berkshire Football Association representative side in 1876–77.

Matches are recorded for the club until 1888. The club's pitch was also used for fixtures for other clubs in the area, when their own grounds were unavailable; the ground hosted an FA Cup tie in 1883.

== Notable players ==
- Arthur Bambridge, future England international
- John Hawtrey, future England international
- Rev. William Blackmore, chosen to play for England against Wales but forced to withdraw through injury
- Sir Charles Hawtrey, actor

== Colours ==
The club's colours were violet and white "jackets".

== Ground ==
The club played its home matches in the school grounds.

== Other St Mark clubs ==
There were two London clubs active at the time under the name St Mark's; St Mark's Guild, a team from a teacher training college who changed their name to Rangers in 1877, and St Mark's College from Chelsea, a team of undergraduates from a college linked to the teacher training college, who played into the late 1880s, and whose old boys formed a football club (Old St Mark's F.C.) in 1885.
