= 1902–03 FA Cup qualifying rounds =

The qualifying campaign for the 1902–03 FA Cup, the thirty-second staging of the world's oldest association football competition, consisted of six rounds of matches, which began on 20 September 1902 with the preliminary round. The Cup was eventually won by Bury, who beat Derby County in the final.

Matches were scheduled to be played at the stadium of the team named first on the date specified for each round, which was always a Saturday. If scores were level after 90 minutes had been played, a replay would take place at the stadium of the second-named team later the same week. If the replayed match was drawn further replays would be held at neutral venues until a winner was determined.

== Tournament calendar ==
| Round | Date | Matches | Number of clubs |
|---|---|---|---|
| Preliminary round | 20 September 1902 | 24 | 224→200 |
| First qualifying round | 4 October 1902 | 48 | 200→152 |
| Second qualifying round | 18 October 1902 | 40 | 152→112 |
| Third qualifying round | 1 November 1902 | 40 | 112→72 |
| Fourth qualifying round | 15 November 1902 | 20 | 72→52 |
| Fifth qualifying round | 29 November 1902 | 10 | 52→42 |
| Intermediate round | 13 December 1902 | 10 | 42→32 |
| First round proper | 7 February 1903 | 16 | 32→16 |
| Second round proper | 21 February 1903 | 8 | 16→8 |
| Third round proper | 7 March 1903 | 4 | 8→4 |
| Semi-final | 21 March 1903 | 2 | 4→2 |
| Final | 18 April 1903 | 1 | 2→1 |

== Preliminary round ==
| | Home team | Score | Away team | Date |
|---|---|---|---|---|
| 1 | Darwen | 2–2 | Padiham | 20 September 1902 |
| 1r | Padiham | 2–2 | Darwen | 23 September 1902 |
| 1r2 | Padiham | 1–0 | Darwen | 30 September 1902 |
| 2 | Leyton | 3–1 | West Ham Garfield | 20 September 1902 |
| 3 | Upton Park | 4–0 | Boleyn Castle | 20 September 1902 |
| 4 | Chatham | 1–1 | Maidstone United | 20 September 1902 |
| 4r | Maidstone United | 2–2 | Chatham | 29 September 1902 |
| 4r2 | Maidstone United | 2–0 | Chatham | 29 September 1902 |
| 5 | Rotherham Town | 2–0 | Attercliffe | 20 September 1902 |
| 6 | Workington | 0–1 | Frizington White Star | 20 September 1902 |
| 7 | Darlington St Augustine's | 1–2 | Tow Law | 20 September 1902 |
| 8 | Leadgate Park | 0–5 | Darlington | 20 September 1902 |
| 9 | Swanscombe | W–W | Folkestone | — |
| 10 | Leytonstone | 2–2 | Woodford | 20 September 1902 |
| 10r | Woodford | 3–1 | Leytonstone | 25 September 1902 |
| 11 | Fulham | 2–0 | Civil Service | 20 September 1902 |
| 12 | Crouch End Vampires | 6–1 | West Hampstead | 20 September 1902 |
| 13 | Trawden Forest | 3–3 | Bacup | 20 September 1902 |
| 13r | Bacup | 4–3 | Trawden Forest | 23 September 1902 |
| 14 | Lowestoft Town | 5–0 | Norwich City | 20 September 1902 |
| 15 | Bromley | 1–2 | West Croydon | 20 September 1902 |
| 16 | Kirkley | 3–1 | Great Yarmouth Town | 20 September 1902 |
| 17 | Deptford Town | 1–2 | Cray Wanderers | 20 September 1902 |
| 18 | Willesden Town | 3–3 | War Office | 20 September 1902 |
| 18r | War Office | 1–2 | Willesden Town | 25 September 1902 |
| 19 | Frizington Town | 0–1 | Moss Bay Exchange | 20 September 1902 |
| 20 | Apsley | 7–1 | Berkhamsted Town | 20 September 1902 |
| 21 | Bedford Queens Works | 4–2 | Leighton Cee Springs | 20 September 1902 |
| 22 | Hove | 1–2 | Brighton Athletic | 20 September 1902 |
| 23 | Chelmsford | 1–0 | Olympic | 20 September 1902 |
| 24 | Newhaven Cement Works | 2–3 | Hastings & St Leonards | 20 September 1902 |

== First qualifying round ==
| | Home team | Score | Away team | Date |
|---|---|---|---|---|
| 1 | Blackpool | 4–1 | Black Lane Temperance | 4 October 1902 |
| 2 | Barrow | 4–0 | Moss Bay Exchange | 4 October 1902 |
| 3 | Shoreham | 4–2 | Worthing | 4 October 1902 |
| 4 | Sheffield | 1–4 | Rotherham Town | 4 October 1902 |
| 5 | Upton Park | 2–1 | Chelmsford | 4 October 1902 |
| 6 | Padiham | 1–2 | Rossendale United | 4 October 1902 |
| 7 | Newark | 4–1 | Boston Town | 4 October 1902 |
| 8 | Shrewsbury Town | 1–2 | Wellington Town | 4 October 1902 |
| 9 | Stockton | 1–1 | Stockton St John's | 4 October 1902 |
| 9r | Stockton | W–W | Stockton St John's | — |
| 10 | Whitby | 3–2 | Scarborough | 4 October 1902 |
| 11 | Norwich CEYMS | 0–5 | Lowestoft Town | 4 October 1902 |
| 12 | Tow Law | 1–1 | Darlington | 4 October 1902 |
| 12r | Darlington | 1–2 | Tow Law | 8 October 1902 |
| 13 | Brierley Hill Alliance | W–W | Halesowen | — |
| 14 | Willington Athletic | 0–3 | Sunderland Royal Rovers | 4 October 1902 |
| 15 | Stockport County | 0–1 | Stalybridge Rovers | 4 October 1902 |
| 16 | Ilkeston Town | 1–3 | Belper Town | 4 October 1902 |
| 17 | Sittingbourne | W–W | Swanscombe | — |
| 18 | Frizington White Star | 1–1 | Black Diamonds | 4 October 1902 |
| 18r | Black Diamonds | 3–2 | Frizington White Star | 8 October 1902 |
| 19 | Hinckley Town | 1–1 | Whitwick White Cross | 4 October 1902 |
| 19r | Whitwick White Cross | 3–1 | Hinckley Town | 8 October 1902 |
| 20 | Fulham | 4–0 | Crouch End Vampires | 4 October 1902 |
| 21 | Accrington Stanley | 5–0 | Bacup | 4 October 1902 |
| 22 | Oswestry United | 1–0 | Royal Welsh Warehouse | 4 October 1902 |
| 23 | Crook Town | 1–1 | Darlington St Hilda's | 4 October 1902 |
| 23r | Darlington St Hilda's | 0–2 | Crook Town | 8 October 1902 |
| 24 | Rochdale Town | 5–1 | White Star Wanderers | 4 October 1902 |
| 25 | West Croydon | 1–0 | Godalming | 4 October 1902 |
| 26 | Maidstone United | 2–1 | Cray Wanderers | 4 October 1902 |
| 27 | Welshpool | 1–3 | Chirk | 4 October 1902 |
| 28 | Kirkley | 4–3 | King's Lynn | 4 October 1902 |
| 29 | Desborough Town | 6–0 | Raunds Town | 4 October 1902 |
| 30 | Bristol East | 1–1 | Bristol St George | 4 October 1902 |
| 30r | Bristol St George | 1–2 | Bristol East | 8 October 1902 |
| 31 | Woodford | 2–0 | Leyton | 4 October 1902 |
| 32 | Grantham Avenue | 2–1 | Worksop Town | 4 October 1902 |
| 33 | Willesden Town | 2–1 | Hampstead | 4 October 1902 |
| 34 | Derby Hills Ivanhoe | 2–2 | Stapleford Town | 4 October 1902 |
| 34r | Stapleford Town | W–W | Derby Hills Ivanhoe | — |
| 35 | Brighton & Hove Albion | 14–2 | Brighton Amateurs | 4 October 1902 |
| 36 | Thornhill United | W–W | Channing Rovers | — |
| 37 | Bedford Queens Works | 2–1 | Apsley | 4 October 1902 |
| 38 | Burton United | W–W | Sutton Town | — |
| 39 | Hastings & St Leonards | 4–1 | St Leonards | 4 October 1902 |
| 40 | Irthlingborough Town | 3–1 | Rushden | 4 October 1902 |
| 41 | Tunbridge Wells | 5–1 | Eastbourne Old Town | 4 October 1902 |
| 42 | North Hants Ironworks | 3–0 | Freemantle | 4 October 1902 |
| 43 | Allsops | 0–2 | Newhall Red Rose | 4 October 1902 |
| 44 | St Helens Recreation | 2–0 | Earlestown | 4 October 1902 |
| 45 | Basingstoke | 0–2 | Eastleigh Athletic | 4 October 1902 |
| 46 | Richmond Town | 1–1 | Croydon Wanderers | 4 October 1902 |
| 46r | Croydon Wanderers | 1–3 | Richmond Town | 8 October 1902 |
| 47 | St Helens Town | 0–0 | Wigan United | 4 October 1902 |
| 47r | Wigan United | 1–5 | St Helens Town | 9 October 1902 |
| 48 | Luton Amateur | 3–0 | Wolverton Town | 4 October 1902 |

== Second qualifying round ==
| | Home team | Score | Away team | Date |
|---|---|---|---|---|
| 1 | Blackpool | 0–1 | Rochdale Town | 18 October 1902 |
| 2 | Barrow | 7–1 | Black Diamonds | 18 October 1902 |
| 3 | Shoreham | 0–12 | Brighton & Hove Albion | 18 October 1902 |
| 4 | Walsall | 0–2 | Brierley Hill Alliance | 18 October 1902 |
| 5 | Rotherham Town | 3–1 | Thornhill United | 18 October 1902 |
| 6 | Swindon Town | 5–0 | Chippenham Town | 18 October 1902 |
| 7 | Morpeth Harriers | 4–0 | Shankhouse | 18 October 1902 |
| 8 | Belper Town | 3–0 | Stapleford Town | 18 October 1902 |
| 9 | Nantwich Town | – | Bye | — |
| 10 | Whitby | 1–7 | Stockton | 18 October 1902 |
| 11 | Poole | 3–2 | Weymouth | 18 October 1902 |
| 12 | Tow Law | 1–1 | Crook Town | 18 October 1902 |
| 12r | Crook Town | 1–1 | Tow Law | 22 October 1902 |
| 12r2 | Tow Law | 0–0 | Crook Town disqualified | 25 October 1902 |
| 13 | Chesham Generals | 2–0 | Chesham Town | 18 October 1902 |
| 14 | Sittingbourne | 1–2 | Maidstone United | 18 October 1902 |
| 15 | Stalybridge Rovers | 3–0 | Buxton | 18 October 1902 |
| 16 | Wellington Town | 0–3 | Stafford Rangers | 18 October 1902 |
| 17 | Gresley Rovers | 5–2 | Coalville Town | 18 October 1902 |
| 18 | Wycombe Wanderers | 0–2 | Aylesbury United | 18 October 1902 |
| 19 | Fulham | 0–0 | Willesden Town | 18 October 1902 |
| 19r | Fulham | 5–0 | Willesden Town | 23 October 1902 |
| 20 | Accrington Stanley | 1–0 | Rossendale United | 18 October 1902 |
| 21 | Oswestry United | 1–0 | Chirk | 18 October 1902 |
| 22 | West Croydon | 2–1 | Richmond Town | 18 October 1902 |
| 23 | Richmond Association | 1–2 | Southall | 18 October 1902 |
| 24 | Maidenhead Norfolkians | 4–0 | Maidenhead | 18 October 1902 |
| 25 | Kirkley | 0–0 | Lowestoft Town | 18 October 1902 |
| 25r | Lowestoft Town | 2–1 | Kirkley | 23 October 1902 |
| 26 | Woodford | 4–3 | Upton Park | 18 October 1902 |
| 27 | Grantham Avenue | 1–1 | Newark | 18 October 1902 |
| 27r | Newark | 1–0 | Grantham Avenue | 23 October 1902 |
| 28 | Royston United | 0–0 | Hemsworth | 18 October 1902 |
| 28r | Royston United | W–W | Hemsworth | — |
| 29 | Keswick | 2–0 | Shaddongate United | 18 October 1902 |
| 30 | Bedford Queens Works | 1–2 | Luton Amateur | 18 October 1902 |
| 31 | Burton United | W–W | Newhall Red Rose | — |
| 32 | Irthlingborough Town | 2–1 | Desborough Town | 18 October 1902 |
| 33 | Tunbridge Wells | 1–2 | Hastings & St Leonards | 18 October 1902 |
| 34 | Market Harborough Town | 1–4 | Whitwick White Cross | 18 October 1902 |
| 35 | Caerphilly | 1–7 | Aberaman | 18 October 1902 |
| 36 | North Hants Ironworks | 2–2 | Eastleigh Athletic | 18 October 1902 |
| 36r | Eastleigh Athletic | 3–0 | North Hants Ironworks | 22 October 1902 |
| 37 | Sunderland West End | 3–4 | Sunderland Royal Rovers | 18 October 1902 |
| 38 | Rhyl | – | Bye | — |
| 39 | St Helens Recreation | 3–0 | St Helens Town | 18 October 1902 |
| 40 | Glastonbury | 0–2 | Bristol East | 18 October 1902 |

== Third qualifying round ==
| | Home team | Score | Away team | Date |
|---|---|---|---|---|
| 1 | Chesterfield | 6–0 | Newark | 1 November 1902 |
| 2 | Nelson | 3–3 | Barrow | 1 November 1902 |
| 2r | Barrow | 2–0 | Nelson | 6 November 1902 |
| 3 | South Bank | 0–0 | Sunderland Royal Rovers | 1 November 1902 |
| 3r | Sunderland Royal Rovers | 4–1 | South Bank | 6 November 1902 |
| 4 | Southall | 3–2 | Aylesbury United | 1 November 1902 |
| 5 | Watford | 1–1 | Fulham | 1 November 1902 |
| 5r | Fulham | 3–0 | Watford | 6 November 1902 |
| 6 | Rotherham Town | 2–1 | Royston United | 1 November 1902 |
| 7 | Crewe Alexandra | 0–3 | Glossop | 1 November 1902 |
| 8 | Oswaldtwistle Rovers | 2–0 | Rochdale Town | 1 November 1902 |
| 9 | Burslem Port Vale | 3–1 | Stalybridge Rovers | 1 November 1902 |
| 10 | Gainsborough Trinity | 1–0 | Doncaster Rovers | 1 November 1902 |
| 11 | Belper Town | 1–4 | Barnsley | 1 November 1902 |
| 12 | Wrexham | 3–0 | Nantwich | 1 November 1902 |
| 13 | Bishop Auckland | 2–1 | Morpeth Harriers | 1 November 1902 |
| 14 | Ilford | 5–0 | Hastings & St Leonards | 1 November 1902 |
| 15 | Tow Law | 1–5 | Stockton | 1 November 1902 |
| 16 | Brierley Hill Alliance | 0–1 | Stafford Rangers | 1 November 1902 |
| 17 | Stourbridge | 7–0 | Oswestry United | 1 November 1902 |
| 18 | Wellingborough Town | 3–0 | Whitwick White Cross | 1 November 1902 |
| 19 | Chesham Generals | 2–2 | Marlow | 1 November 1902 |
| 19r | Marlow | 2–4 | Chesham Generals | 6 November 1902 |
| 20 | New Brompton | 2–0 | Clapton | 1 November 1902 |
| 21 | Gresley Rovers | 0–1 | Kettering | 1 November 1902 |
| 22 | Kidderminster Harriers | W–W | Hereford | — |
| 23 | Oxford City | 2–2 | Brentford | 1 November 1902 |
| 23r | Brentford | 5–4 | Oxford City | 5 November 1902 |
| 24 | Queens Park Rangers | 0–3 | Luton Town | 1 November 1902 |
| 25 | Wallsend Park Villa | 1–0 | Gateshead NER | 1 November 1902 |
| 26 | West Croydon | 1–3 | Lowestoft Town | 1 November 1902 |
| 27 | Eastleigh Athletic | 7–0 | Staple Hill | 1 November 1902 |
| 28 | Maidstone United | 3–2 | Woodford | 1 November 1902 |
| 29 | Coventry City | 3–1 | Aberaman | 1 November 1902 |
| 30 | Maidenhead Norfolkians | 2–2 | Shepherd's Bush | 1 November 1902 |
| 30r | Shepherd's Bush | 5–1 | Maidenhead Norfolkians | 6 November 1902 |
| 31 | Yeovil Casuals | 0–4 | Swindon Town | 1 November 1902 |
| 32 | Bristol East | 1–1 | Poole | 1 November 1902 |
| 32r | Poole | 4–3 | Bristol East | 5 November 1902 |
| 33 | Keswick | 0–3 | Southport Central | 1 November 1902 |
| 34 | Whiteheads | 6–0 | Street | 1 November 1902 |
| 35 | Brighton & Hove Albion | 5–5 | Grays United | 1 November 1902 |
| 35r | Grays United | 0–3 | Brighton & Hove Albion | 5 November 1902 |
| 36 | Burton United | 2–0 | Northampton Town | 1 November 1902 |
| 37 | Irtlingborough Town | 0–1 | Leicester Fosse | 1 November 1902 |
| 38 | Manchester United | 7–0 | Accrington Stanley | 1 November 1902 |
| 39 | St Helens Recreation | 18–0 | Rhyl | 1 November 1902 |
| 40 | Luton Amateur | 5–0 | West Norwood | 1 November 1902 |

== Fourth qualifying round ==
| | Home team | Score | Away team | Date |
|---|---|---|---|---|
| 1 | Southport Central | 2–1 | Barrow | 15 November 1902 |
| 2 | Luton Town | 5–1 | Lowestoft Town | 15 November 1902 |
| 3 | Gainsborough Trinity | 3–0 | Rotherham Town | 15 November 1902 |
| 4 | Swindon Town | 7–1 | Poole | 15 November 1902 |
| 5 | Stockton | 1–4 | Bishop Auckland | 15 November 1902 |
| 6 | Ilford | 1–0 | Brighton & Hove Albion | 15 November 1902 |
| 7 | Stourbridge | 2–2 | Kidderminster Harriers | 15 November 1902 |
| 7r | Kidderminster Harriers | 0–0 | Stourbridge | 19 November 1902 |
| 7r2 | Stourbridge | 0–2 | Kidderminster Harriers | 24 November 1902 |
| 8 | Wellingborough Town | 4–1 | Leicester Fosse | 15 November 1902 |
| 9 | Wallsend Park Villa | 0–1 | Sunderland Royal Rovers | 15 November 1902 |
| 10 | Fulham | 4–1 | Luton Amateur | 15 November 1902 |
| 11 | Barnsley | 3–2 | Chesterfield | 15 November 1902 |
| 12 | Brentford | 5–0 | Southall | 15 November 1902 |
| 13 | Shepherd's Bush | 2–0 | Chesham Generals | 15 November 1902 |
| 14 | Maidstone United | 0–3 | New Brompton | 15 November 1902 |
| 15 | Glossop | 4–0 | Wrexham | 15 November 1902 |
| 16 | Coventry City | 5–2 | Stafford Rangers | 15 November 1902 |
| 17 | Whiteheads | 3–1 | Eastleigh Athletic | 15 November 1902 |
| 18 | Burton United | 3–1 | Kettering | 15 November 1902 |
| 19 | Manchester United | 3–2 | Oswaldtwistle Rovers | 15 November 1902 |
| 20 | St Helens Recreation | 2–1 | Burslem Port Vale | 15 November 1902 |

== Fifth qualifying round ==
| | Home team | Score | Away team | Date |
|---|---|---|---|---|
| 1 | Luton Town | 6–1 | Fulham | 29 November 1902 |
| 2 | Bishop Auckland | 8–0 | Sunderland Royal Rovers | 29 November 1902 |
| 3 | New Brompton | 4–1 | Ilford | 29 November 1902 |
| 4 | Barnsley | 3–2 | Gainsborough Trinity | 29 November 1902 |
| 5 | Brentford | 2–2 | Shepherd's Bush | 29 November 1902 |
| 5r | Shepherd's Bush | 1–1 | Brentford | 3 December 1902 |
| 5r2 | Shepherd's Bush | 0–1 | Brentford | 8 December 1902 |
| 6 | Glossop | 5–0 | St Helens Recreation | 29 November 1902 |
| 7 | Coventry City | 2–2 | Kidderminster Harriers | 29 November 1902 |
| 7r | Kidderminster Harriers | 4–2 | Coventry City | 1 December 1902 |
| 8 | Whiteheads | 0–9 | Swindon Town | 29 November 1902 |
| 9 | Burton United | 5–1 | Wellingborough Town | 29 November 1902 |
| 10 | Manchester United | 4–1 | Southport Central | 29 November 1902 |
