= Albert Lindsay =

English footballer

Personal information
- Full name: Albert Fowles Lindsay
- Date of birth: 26 September 1881
- Place of birth: West Hartlepool, England
- Date of death: 1961 (aged 79–80)
- Place of death: West Hartlepool, England
- Position: Goalkeeper

Senior career*
Years	Team	Apps	(Gls)
1899–1900	Park Villa		
1900–1901	St James		
1901–1902	West Hartlepool		
1902–1904	Sunderland	3	(0)
1904–1906	Luton Town		
1906	Glossop	2	(0)
1906–19??	Sunderland Royal Rovers		
- * Club domestic league appearances and goals

Albert Fowles Lindsay (26 September 1881 – 1961) was an English professional footballer who played as a goalkeeper for Sunderland.
