= Sunderland Royal Rovers F.C. =

Sunderland Royal Rovers
- Full name: Sunderland Royal Rovers Football Club
- Nicknames: the Royalists, the Rovers
- Founded: 1884
- Dissolved: 1918
- Ground: Blue House Field
- Capacity: Unknown
- President: George Bell
- Secretary: W. T. Lazenby
Home colours	Change colours

Sunderland Royal Rovers Football Club was an English association football club based in Sunderland, England, formed in 1884.

== History ==
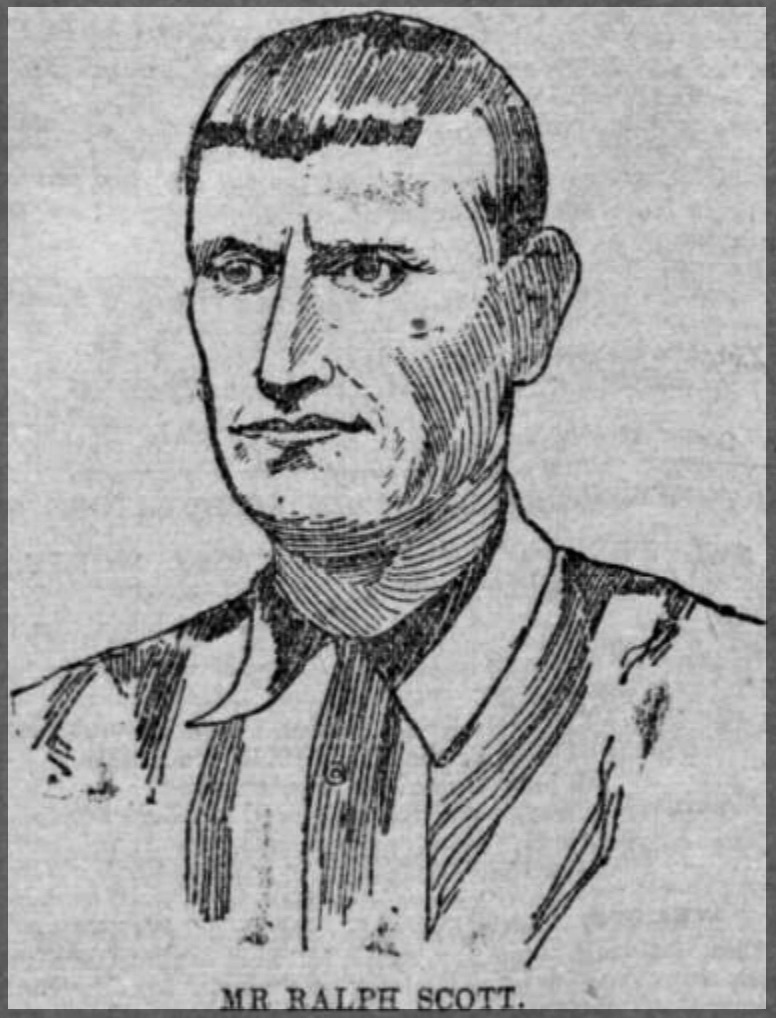
Ralph Scott, from the Sunderland Daily Echo, 3 September 1904

The club was founded in 1884 by a group of eight- and nine-year old friends, who clubbed together to buy an India rubber football for fourpence; the boys chose the name Royal Rovers after a public house near to the home of one of the boys' grandparents. As the side grew and aged together, the players looked for more competitive football, and was a founder member of the Wearside Alliance in 1892, winning the title in 1894–95; the club increasingly used the name Sunderland Royal Rovers following this triumph.

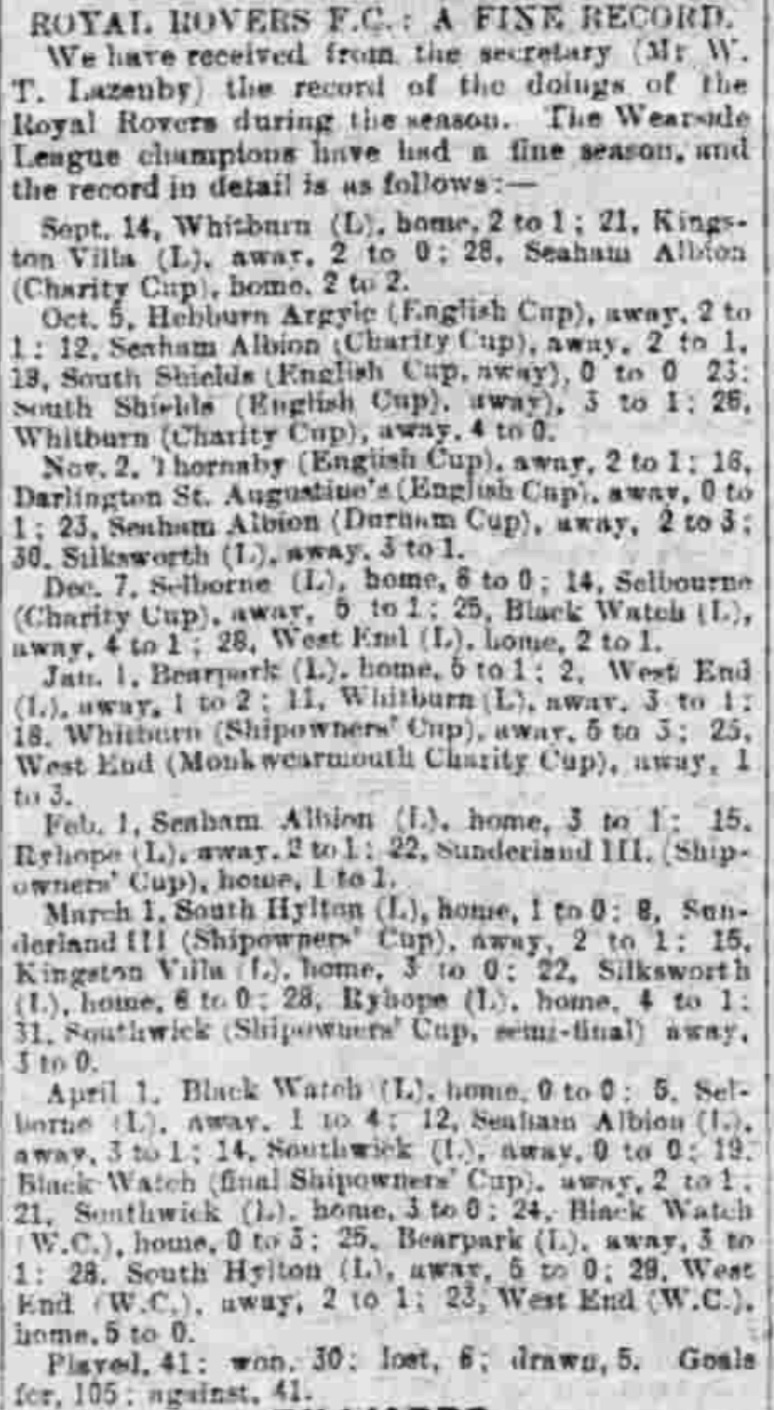
The club's 1901–02 season record, Sunderland Daily Echo, 3 May 1902

The club joined the more prestigious Wearside League in 1896, and at the turn of the century became the strongest non-league side in the area; it won the League every year from 1900–01 to 1903–04, and in the first of those seasons also won two local competitions (the Shipowners' Cup and Monkwearmouth Charity Cup). One of its founder players - Ralph Scott - was still vice-captain for the club as late as the 1904–05 season.

The Rovers moved up to a national level by entering the FA Cup qualifying rounds from 1901–02 onwards. The club never reached the first round proper; its best run was to the final qualifying stage in 1902–03, at which stage the club lost at Bishop Auckland.

The club left the Wearside League in 1906 to become one of the founder members of the new North Eastern League, which featured the stronger non-league clubs and the reserve sides of the Football League clubs - although the Rovers attended the initial meetings, the decision to restrict the first season to ten clubs meant the club was left out as first alternative, but the withdrawals of West Hartlepool and Hull City created space for the Rovers and West Stanley. This required the club to turn semi-professional, paying 10s per match.

After a couple of decent seasons, the lure of better pay meant the club haemorrhaged players to better-resourced sides, and it spent the last part of the decade at the bottom of the table.

Before the 1910–11 season, the club shortened its name to Sunderland Rovers, and by the start of the First World War had recovered to mid-table status. However, the club's existence ended during the War, as the British Army took over its ground in April 1918, and the club's failure to send a representative to a meeting of the new North Eastern League in April 1919 was taken as tacit acceptance that the club had died. The Rovers' final reported game was a first round Shipowners' Cup defeat at Sunderland West End in February 1918.

== Colours ==
The club wore red and white stripes - colours common in many Wearside clubs, including Wallsend Park Villa, North Shields, and, of course, Sunderland A.F.C. - with photographic evidence demonstrating the shirts were accompanied by black shorts and socks. The club's change shirt was blue.

== Ground ==
After its initial games on ad hoc patches of ground behind the dockside cattle sheds, the club found a permanent home in 1895 at the old Blue House Ground in Hendon, re-christened the Royal Rovers Ground.

== Honours ==
- Wearside League
  - Champion: 1900–01, 1901–02, 1902–03, 1903–04
  - Runner-up: 1904–05
- Wearside Alliance
  - Champion: 1894–95
- Shipowners Cup
  - Champion: 1898–99, 1900–01, 1901–02
- Monkwearmouth Charity Cup
  - Champion: 1900–01
  - Runner-up: 1901–02

== Notable players ==
- Fred Gibson, outside-left, played for the club in 1908–09
- William Gibson, defender, played for the club in the late 1900s
- Albert Lindsay, goalkeeper, played for the club in the late 1900s
- Bill Berry and Tommy Stewart, who both joined Sunderland in 1904
- Teddy Anderson, played for the club before joining Birmingham in 1905
