= York Road (Maidenhead) =

Football stadium in Maidenhead, Berkshire, England

Coordinates: 51°31′12″N 0°43′05″W

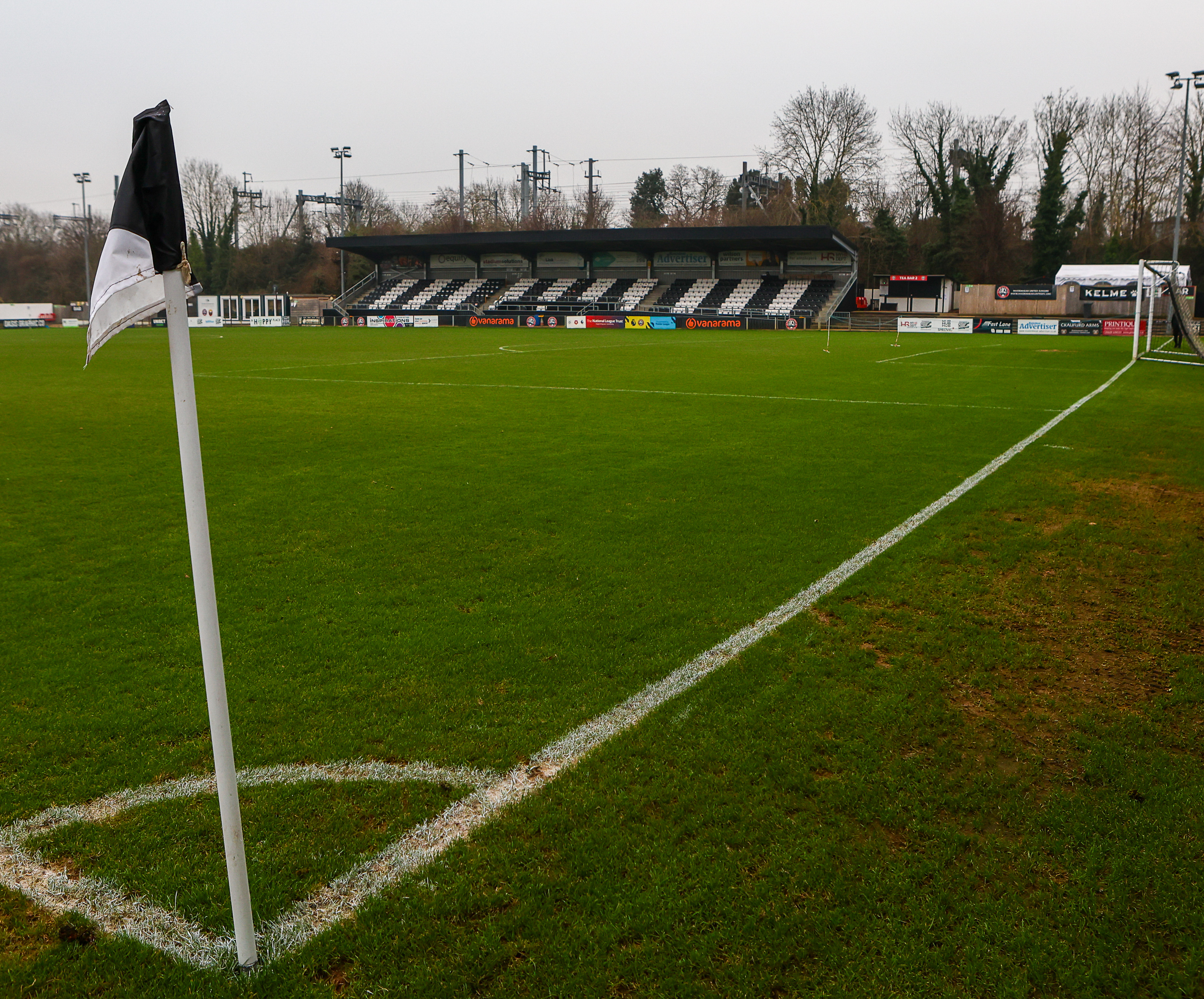
- Interactive map of York Road
- Location: Maidenhead, England
- Owner: Maidenhead United
- Capacity: 4,500 (550 seated)
- Surface: Grass
- Public transit: Maidenhead

Construction
- Opened: 1871

Tenants
- Maidenhead United (1871–present); Hayes & Yeading United (2014–2016)

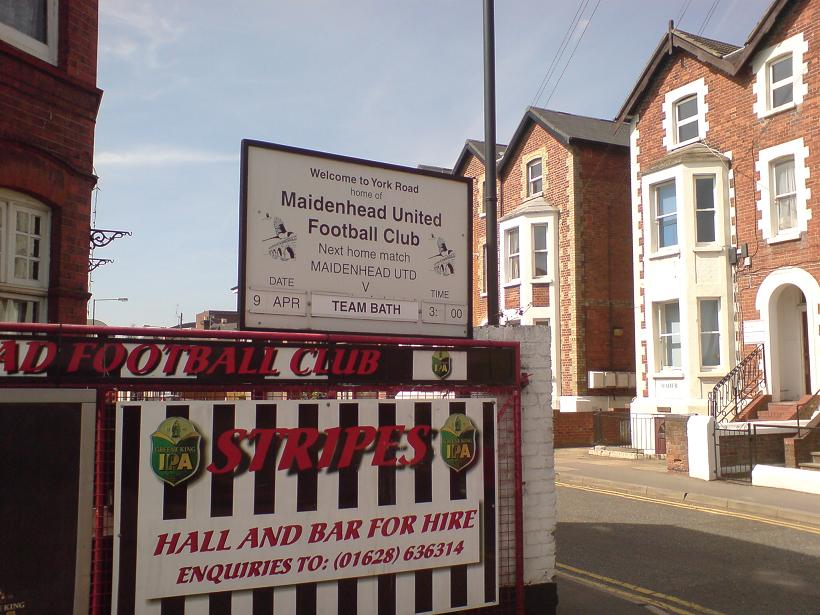
The entrance

York Road is a football stadium in Maidenhead, Berkshire, England. The home ground of Maidenhead United, it is acknowledged by The Football Association and FIFA to be the oldest continuously used senior association football ground in the world by the same club, having been home to the club since 1871. A blue plaque commemorating this is placed just inside the home turnstiles on the York Road side of the ground.

== History ==
The ground was initially the home of Maidenhead Cricket Club and it was with their permission that, shortly after their foundation in 1870, the football club played their first match at York Road on 16 February 1871 against Marlow. It is officially known as the Desborough Sports Ground, named after the patron of sport in the town, William Grenfell, 1st Baron Desborough, who sold the ground to the club during the 1920–21 season. The previous season, only one competitive first-team match was played at the ground – against 1st Scots Guards – while most competitive fixtures were played at Kidwells Park, the former home of Maidenhead Norfolkians. However, from 1920–21 onwards, the Magpies resumed playing all their home matches at York Road.

The current capacity of the ground is 4,500 (550 seated) and holds an "A" grading. The club's record attendance is 7,989 for the 1936 FA Amateur Cup quarter-final against Southall. A further 2,000 spectators are estimated to have watched the match from the adjacent railway embankment. The ground record attendance was set on Easter Monday 1947 when 8,277 people paid total receipts of £494 to watch the Berks & Bucks Senior Cup Final between Slough Town and Wycombe Wanderers.

The ground facilitates fans in a mixture of covered all-seater stands, covered and uncovered traditional terraces and flat concrete by the side of the pitch. As well as the normal facilities for lower-league football, the ground hosts Stripes Bar which can be hired out for functions. The ground is located just a few minutes walk away from the town centre and from Maidenhead railway station.

In 2023, the club announced plans to build a new stadium to replace York Road, however, the Royal Borough of Windsor and Maidenhead blocked these plans due to concerns surrounding space. Attempts have been made since then to carry on with the project, but nothing is official as of yet.
