= William Gibson (footballer, born 1876) =

Irish footballer

Personal information
- Full name: William Kennedy Gibson
- Date of birth: 1876
- Place of birth: Ireland
- Position: Full-back

Senior career*
Years	Team	Apps	(Gls)
1894–1901	Cliftonville		
1901–1902	Sunderland	1	(0)
1902–1905	Bishop Auckland		
1905–1908	Cliftonville		
1908–19??	Sunderland Royal Rovers		
- * Club domestic league appearances and goals

William Kennedy Gibson (born 1876) was an Irish professional footballer who played as a full-back for Sunderland.
