= Berks & Bucks Senior Cup =

- Organiser(s): Berks & Bucks FA
- Founded: 1878; 148 years ago
- Region: Berkshire; Buckinghamshire
- Teams: 29 (2025–26)
- Current champions: Wycombe Wanderers (29th title)
- Most championships: Wycombe Wanderers (29 titles)

The Berks & Bucks FA County Senior Cup is the Senior County Cup competition of the Berks & Bucks FA.

== History ==
The competition was first held in 1878–79, at a time when the FA Cup had been established for only seven years, the Football League had not yet been formed, and organised football competitions were rare outside the United Kingdom. Originally known as the Berks & Bucks Challenge Cup, the inaugural final was won by Reading, who defeated Marlow 1–0 at the Reading Cricket Ground.

The trophy was shared in the following season after Swifts and Old Philberdians drew twice in the final, leading the association to declare both clubs joint holders.

During the late 19th century, the competition was dominated by Marlow, who won the cup eleven times before 1900. Reading withdrew from the competition in 1894 after turning professional, but had re‑entered by the 1940–41 season, when they reached the final. A separate amateur club from the town, Reading Amateurs, won the competition in 1905 and 1906.

Several early competitors later merged to form modern clubs that continue to take part in the competition. Chesham Town and Chesham Generals, both regular entrants in the late nineteenth century, merged to form Chesham United in 1917. Maidenhead and Maidenhead Norfolkians, also frequent participants, combined to create Maidenhead United in 1919. Swifts, Slough Albion and the Young Men's Friendly Society, all of whom competed in the early years of the Senior Cup, merged in 1890 to form Slough, with further reorganisations eventually producing Slough Town.

The competition has traditionally featured non‑league clubs, although three Football League sides Wycombe Wanderers, Reading and Milton Keynes Dons have also taken part. Wycombe And Reading have competed since the early years of the tournament, while Milton Keynes Dons, founded in 2004, are a more recent entrant. Wycombe Wanderers are the most successful club in the competition’s history, with 29 titles and 25 runner‑up finishes.

In 2023, Bracknell Town defeated Marlow 1–0 in the final at the Racecourse Ground, Ascot, becoming the 28th different club to lift the trophy.

In 2026, Wycombe Wanderers claimed their 29th title, defeating Hungerford Town on penalties after a 2–2 draw in the final at Arbour Park, Slough.

== Teams ==
A total of 29 teams will compete in the 2025–26 season.

Team	Stadium	League
Abingdon Town	Culham Road	Hellenic League Division One
Abingdon United	Northcourt Road	Hellenic League Premier Division
AFC Aldermaston	Waterside Park	Wessex League Division One
Amersham Town	Spratleys Meadow	Combined Counties League Division One
Ascot United	Racecourse Ground	Isthmian League South Central Division
Aylesbury Vale Dynamos	Greenfleets Stadium	SSMFL Premier Division
Beaconsfield Town	Holloways Park	Southern League Premier Division South
Berks County	The Racecourse	Combined Counties League Premier Division North
Binfield	Hill Farm Lane	Combined Counties League Premier Division North
Bracknell Town	Bottom Meadow	Southern League Premier Division South
Buckingham	Stratford Fields	SSMFL Premier Division
Burnham	The 1878 Stadium	Combined Counties League Premier Division North
Chesham United	The Meadow	Southern League Premier Division South
Didcot Town	Loop Meadow Stadium	Southern League Division One Central
Holyport	Summerleaze Village	Combined Counties League Premier Division North
Holmer Green	Watchet Lane	Combined Counties League Division One
Hungerford Town	Bulpit Lane	National League South
Kintbury Rangers	The Recreation Ground	Hellenic League Division One
Langley	Honeycroft	Combined Counties League Division One
Maidenhead United	York Road	National League South
Marlow	Alfred Davis Memorial Ground	Isthmian League South Central Division
Milton Keynes Dons	Stadium MK	EFL League Two
Milton Keynes Irish	The Irish Centre	SSMFL Premier Division
Milton United	Potash Lane	Combined Counties League Premier Division North
Newport Pagnell Town	Willen Road	United Counties League Premier Division South
Penn & Tylers Green	French School Meadows	Combined Counties League Division One
Reading	Madejski Stadium	EFL League One
Risborough Rangers	The BEP Stadium	SSMFL Premier Division
Sandhurst Town	Bottom Meadow	Combined Counties League Premier Division South
Slough Town	Arbour Park	National League South
Wallingford & Crowmarsh	Hithercroft	Combined Counties League Premier Division North
Wantage Town	Alfredian Park	Hellenic League Premier Division
Winslow United	Elmfields Gate	SSMFL Premier Division
Windsor & Eton	Stag Meadow	Combined Counties League Premier Division North
Wokingham Town	Lowther Road	Combined Counties League Division One
Woodley United	Scours Lane	Combined Counties League Division One
Wycombe Wanderers	Adams Park	EFL League One

== Finals ==
This section lists every final of the competition played since 1878–79, the winners, the runners-up, and the result.

=== Key ===
Match went to a replay
Match went to extra time
Match decided by a penalty shootout after extra time
Shared trophy

Season	Winners	Result	Runner-up	Notes
1878–79	Reading	1–0	Marlow	After extra-time.
1879–80	Swifts; Old Philberdians	1–1		Trophy shared. Replay. First match 2–2.
1880–81	Marlow	1–0	Remnants	
1881–82	Swifts	4–1	Maidenhead	
1882–83	Marlow	–	Swifts	Awarded to Marlow. Swifts scratched as being double-booked; in lieu of the final, Marlow played a Berks & Bucks Select, which ended goalless.
1883–84	Windsor (1882)	6–2	South Reading	
1884–85	Marlow	6–0	Windsor (1882)	
1885–86	Marlow	1–0	Windsor (1882)	
1886–87	Windsor (1882)	2–0	South Reading	
1887–88	Marlow	2–1	Chesham	
1888–89	Marlow	5–0	Wolverton LNWR	
1889–90	Marlow	1–0	Windsor (1882)	
1890–91	Windsor Phoenix Athletic	5–1	2nd Scots Guards	
1891–92	Reading	2–0	Wolverton LNWR	
1892–93	Wolverton LNWR	3–0	Maidenhead	
1893–94	Marlow	3–1	Maidenhead	
1894–95	Maidenhead	2–0	Marlow	
1895–96	Maidenhead	1–0	Wolverton LNWR	Second replay. First match 2–2. Replay 1–1.
1896–97	Marlow	2–1	Wycombe Wanderers	
1897–98	Newbury	2–1	Maidenhead	Replay. First match 1–1.
1898–99	Marlow	2–1	Wycombe Wanderers	
1899–1900	Marlow	4–3	Wycombe Wanderers	Replay. First match 1–1. Abandoned at extra-time.
1900–01	Chesham Generals	5–1	Stantonbury St James	
1901–02	Wycombe Wanderers	3–0	Slough	
1902–03	Slough	3–1	Aylesbury United	
1903–04	Chesham Town	2–1	Reading Amateur	Replay. First match 1–1.
1904–05	Reading Amateur	2–1	Chesham Generals	
1905–06	Reading Amateur	4–0	Maidenhead Norfolkians	
1906–07	Maidenhead Norfolkians	3–0	Marlow	Replay. First match 1–1.
1907–08	Chesham Town	2–0	Windsor & Eton (1892)	
1908–09	Wycombe Wanderers	3–0	Chesham Town	
1909–10	Wycombe Wanderers	3–0	Wokingham Athletic	Replay. First match 0–0.
1910–11	Windsor & Eton (1892)	2–0	Chesham Town	Replay. First match 0–0.
1911–12	Maidenhead United	2–0	Aylesbury United	
1912–13	Wycombe Wanderers	2–1	Maidenhead Norfolkians	Replay. First match 1–1.
1913–14	Aylesbury United	1–0	Maidenhead	
1914–1919	No competition due to World War I.			
1919–20	Slough	3–2	Maidenhead United	
1920–21	Wycombe Wanderers	5–2	Slough	
1921–22	Chesham United	2–0	Wycombe Wanderers	Replay. First match 1–1.
1922–23	Wycombe Wanderers	4–0	Maidenhead United	
1923–24	Slough	5–1	Newbury Town	
1924–25	Wycombe Wanderers	2–0	Windsor & Eton (1892)	Replay. First match 0–0.
1925–26	Chesham United	4–3	Maidenhead United	Second replay. First match 3–3. Replay 1–1.
1926–27	Slough	2–1	Windsor & Eton (1892)	
1927–28	Maidenhead United	1–0	Wycombe Wanderers	
1928–29	Chesham United	3–1	Aylesbury United	Replay after protest. First match 7–1.
1929–30	Maidenhead United	2–1	Slough Town	Replay. First match 1–1.
1930–31	Maidenhead United	3–0	Chesham United	Replay. First match 0–0.
1931–32	Maidenhead United	2–0	Wycombe Wanderers	
1932–33	Wycombe Wanderers	1–0	Chesham United	
1933–34	Chesham United	3–0	Wycombe Wanderers	Replay. First match 0–0.
1934–35	Wycombe Wanderers	3–0	Aylesbury United	
1935–36	Slough	3–1	Maidenhead United	
1936–37	Windsor & Eton (1892)	3–1	Wycombe Wanderers	
1937–38	Windsor & Eton (1892)	1–0	Wycombe Wanderers	
1938–39	Maidenhead United	3–2	Windsor & Eton (1892)	Second replay. First match 1–1. Replay 0–0.
1939–40	Wycombe Wanderers	4–0	Redford Sports	
1940–41	Windsor & Eton (1892)	3–2	Reading	
1941–42	Windsor & Eton (1892)	4–1	Wycombe Wanderers	Replay. First match 1–1.
1942–43	Windsor & Eton (1892)	4–1	Marlow	
1943–44	Windsor & Eton (1892)	6–4	Wycombe Wanderers	Second replay. First match 2–2. Replay 1–1.
1944–45	Windsor & Eton (1892)	2–0	RAF High Wycombe	Replay. First match 5–5.
1945–46	Maidenhead United	1–0	Windsor & Eton (1892)	
1946–47	Wycombe Wanderers	2–1	Slough Town	
1947–48	Chesham United	2–1	Wycombe Wanderers	
1948–49	Wycombe Wanderers	2–1	Slough Town	Replay. First match 0–0.
1949–50	Wycombe Wanderers	1–0	Slough Town	Replay. First match 1–1.
1950–51	Chesham United	2–1	Slough Town	
1951–52	Slough Centre	1–0	Chesham United	
1952–53	Slough Centre	2–1	Slough Town	Replay. First match 2–2.
1953–54	Wycombe Wanderers	3–1	Slough Centre	Replay. First match 1–1.
1954–55	Slough Town	2–1	Wycombe Wanderers	
1955–56	Maidenhead United	3–2	Wycombe Wanderers	Replay. First match 2–2.
1956–57	Maidenhead United	3–1	Windsor & Eton (1892)	
1957–58	Wycombe Wanderers	1–0	Maidenhead United	
1958–59	Abingdon Town	2–1	Aylesbury Town	
1959–60	Wycombe Wanderers	3–0	Maidenhead United	
1960–61	Maidenhead United	2–1	Chesham United	Replay. First match 1–1.
1961–62	Windsor & Eton (1892)	2–0	Wycombe Wanderers	
1962–63	Maidenhead United	2–0	Chesham United	
1963–64	Wycombe Wanderers	2–1	Windsor & Eton (1892)	
1964–65	Chesham United	4–2	Slough Town	
1965–66	Maidenhead United	4–2	Hazells (Aylesbury)	
1966–67	Chesham United	2–1	Wycombe Wanderers	
1967–68	Wycombe Wanderers	3–2	Slough Town	
1968–69	Wokingham Town	1–0	Slough Town	
1969–70	Maidenhead United	3–0	Wolverton Town	
1970–71	Slough Town	1–0	Wycombe Wanderers	Replay. First match 0–0.
1971–72	Slough Town	3–0	Wycombe Wanderers	
1972–73	Wycombe Wanderers	1–0	Slough Town	
1973–74	Wycombe Wanderers	3–1	Slough Town	
1974–75	Thatcham Town	0–4	Wycombe Wanderers	Awarded to Thatcham. Wycombe disqualified.
1975–76	Chesham United	4–0	Hungerford Town	
1976–77	Slough Town	3–1	Hungerford Town	Replay. First match 1–1.
1977–78	Wycombe Wanderers	2–0	Chalfont St Peter	
1978–79	Wycombe Wanderers	2–1	Hungerford Town	Replay. First match 2–2.
1979–80	Milton Keynes City	2–0	Aylesbury United	
1980–81	Slough Town	2–0	Milton Keynes City	
1981–82	Hungerford Town	1–0	Wycombe Wanderers	
1982–83	Wokingham Town	2–0	Bracknell Town	
1983–84	Buckingham Town	1–0	Abingdon United	
1984–85	Wokingham Town	1–0	Chesham United	
1985–86	Aylesbury United	1–0	Wycombe Wanderers	Replay. First match 2–2.
1986–87	Wycombe Wanderers	3–2	Aylesbury United	
1987–88	Windsor & Eton (1892)	3–2	Wokingham Town	
1988–89	Windsor & Eton (1892)	2–1	Abingdon Town	
1989–90	Wycombe Wanderers	2–1	Slough Town	
1990–91	Marlow	3–2	Wycombe Wanderers	
1991–92	Chesham United	3–1	Windsor & Eton (1892)	
1992–93	Chesham United	1–0	Abingdon Town	
1993–94	Marlow	1–0	Chesham United	
1994–95	Reading	1–0	Slough Town	
1995–96	Wokingham Town	1–0	Aylesbury United	
1996–97	Aylesbury United	2–1	Reading	
1997–98	Maidenhead United	2–1	Reading	
1998–99	Maidenhead United	4–1	Wycombe Wanderers	
1999–2000	Aylesbury United	2–0	Reading	
2000–01	Chesham United	1–0	Maidenhead United	
2001–02	Maidenhead United	0–0	Chesham United	Maidenhead won 4–2 on penalties.
2002–03	Maidenhead United	4–1	Aylesbury United	
2003–04	Chesham United	4–1	Bracknell Town	
2004–05	Wycombe Wanderers	3–2	Aylesbury United	
2005–06	Wycombe Wanderers	2–1	Milton Keynes Dons	
2006–07	Milton Keynes Dons	2–1	Maidenhead United	
2007–08	Chesham United	3–0	Wycombe Wanderers	
2008–09	Windsor & Eton (1892)	1–0	Marlow	
2009–10	Maidenhead United	3–2	Wycombe Wanderers	
2010–11	Wycombe Wanderers	3–2	Maidenhead United	
2011–12	Wycombe Wanderers	0–0	Chesham United	Wycombe won 4–2 on penalties.
2012–13	Beaconsfield SYCOB	2–0	Chesham United	
2013–14	Chesham United	1–0	Beaconsfield SYCOB	
2014–15	Maidenhead United	4–0	Aylesbury United	
2015–16	Aylesbury	1–0	Chesham United	
2016–17	Maidenhead United	1–0	Hungerford Town	
2017–18	Chesham United	2–2	Milton Keynes Dons	Chesham won 4–3 on penalties.
2018–19	Slough Town	3–1	Reading	
2019–20	Competition abandoned due to COVID-19 pandemic.			
2020–21	No competition due to COVID-19 pandemic.			
2021–22	Reading	4–0	Ascot United	
2022–23	Bracknell Town	1–0	Marlow	
2023–24	Reading	2–1	Marlow	
2024–25	Bracknell Town	3–1	Flackwell Heath	
2025–26	Hungerford Town	2-2	Wycombe Wanderers	Wycombe won 4-1 on penalties.

=== Results by teams ===
Club	Wins	First final won	Last final won	Runner-up	Last final lost	Total final apps.	Notes
Wycombe Wanderers	29	1901–02	2025-26	25	2009–10	54	
Maidenhead United	22	1894–95	2016–17	14	2010–11	36	(Note: Won 2 titles as Maidenhead.)
Chesham United	17	1900–01	2017–18	12	2015–16	29	(Note: Won 1 title as Chesham Generals.)
Marlow	13	1880–81	1993–94	7	2023–24	20	
Windsor & Eton (1892) †	12	1910–11	2008–09	8	1991–92	20	(Note: Dissolved in 2011.)
Slough Town	11	1902–03	2018–19	15	1994–95	26	
Reading	5	1878–79	2023–24	5	2018–19	10	
Aylesbury United	4	1913–14	1999–2000	10	2014–15	14	
Wokingham Town	4	1968–69	1995–96	1	1987–88	5	
Windsor (1882) †	2	1883–84	1886–87	3	1889–90	5	(Note: Dissolved in 1890.)
Chesham Town †	2	1903–04	1907–08	2	1910–11	4	(Note: Dissolved in 1917. Merged with Chesham Generals to form Chesham United.)
Bracknell Town	2	2022–23	2024–25	2	2003–04	4	
Reading Amateur †	2	1904–05	1905–06	1	1903–04	3	(Note: Dissolved.)
Slough Centre †	2	1951–52	1952–53	1	1953–54	3	(Note: Dissolved in 1960s.)
Swifts †	2	1879–80	1881–82	1	1882–83	3	(Note: Dissolved in 1895. Shared trophy in 1879–80.)
Hungerford Town	1	1981–82	1981–82	4	2025–26	5	
Wolverton †	1	1892–93	1892–93	4	1969–70	5	(Note: Dissolved in 1992. Won 1 title as Wolverton LWNR.)
Abingdon Town	1	1958–59	1958–59	2	1992–93	3	
Maidenhead Norfolkians †	1	1906–07	1906–07	2	1912–13	3	(Note: Dissolved in 1918. Merged with Maidenhead to form Maidenhead.)
Milton Keynes Dons	1	2006–07	2006–07	2	2017–18	3	
Beaconsfield SYCOB	1	2012–13	2012–13	1	2013–14	2	
Milton Keynes City	1	1979–80	1979–80	1	1980–81	2	
Aylesbury	1	2015–16	2015–16	0	–	1	
Buckingham Town †	1	1983–84	1983–84	0	–	1	(Note: Dissolved in 2020.)
Newbury	1	1897–98	1897–98	0	–	1	
Old Philberdians †	1	1879–80	1879–80	0	–	1	(Note: Dissolved in 1889. Shared trophy in 1879–80)
Thatcham Town	1	1974–75	1974–75	0	–	1	
Windsor Phoenix †	1	1890–91	1890–91	0	–	1	(Note: Dissolved.)
South Reading †	0	–	–	2	1886–87	2	(Note: Dissolved in 1894.)
2nd Scots Guards	0	–	–	1	1890–91	1	
Abingdon United	0	–	–	1	1983–84	1	
Ascot United	0	–	–	1	2021–22	1	
Aylesbury Town †	0	–	–	1	1958–59	1	(Note: Dissolved.)
Chalfont St Peter	0	–	–	1	1977–78	1	
Chesham †	0	–	–	1	1887–88	1	(Note: Dissolved.)
Flackwell Heath	0	–	–	1	2024-25	1	
Hazells (Aylesbury) †	0	–	–	1	1965–66	1	(Note: Dissolved in 1995.)
Newbury Town †	0	–	–	1	1923–24	1	(Note: Dissolved in 1995.)
RAF High Wycombe	0	–	–	1	1944–45	1	
Redford Sports †	0	–	–	1	1939–40	1	(Note: Dissolved in 1948.)
Remnants †	0	–	–	1	1880–81	1	(Note: Dissolved in 1882.)
Stantonbury St James †	0	–	–	1	1900–01	1	(Note: Dissolved.)
Wokingham Athletic †	0	–	–	1	1909–10	1	(Note: Dissolved.)

== Recent finals ==
6 May 2013	Beaconsfield SYCOB	2–0	Chesham United	Chesham
13:00 BST		Report		Stadium: The Meadow; Referee: Robert Hodges

23 April 2014	Beaconsfield SYCOB	0–1	Chesham United	Windsor
19:45 BST		Report		Stadium: Stag Meadow; Referee: Adrian Gillett

4 May 2015	Aylesbury United	0–4	Maidenhead United	Chesham
15:00 BST		Report		Stadium: The Meadow; Referee: Adrian Piggott

2 May 2016	Aylesbury	1–0	Chesham United	Windsor
15:00 BST		Report		Stadium: Stag Meadow; Referee: Kieran Bailey

25 July 2017	Hungerford Town	0–1	Maidenhead United	Slough
19:45 BST		Report		Stadium: Arbour Park; Referee: Iain Williamson

2 May 2018	Chesham United	2–2 (4–3 p)	Milton Keynes Dons	Milton Keynes
19:45 BST		Report		Stadium: Stadium MK; Attendance: 521; Referee: Sunny Singh Gill

6 May 2019	Reading	1–3	Slough Town	Bracknell
15:00 BST		[https://berks-bucksfa.com/cups-and-competitions/results?countyCupKey=782957256		Stadium: Larges Lane; Attendance: 815; Referee: Jason Richardson

7 May 2022	Ascot United	0–4	Reading	Slough
15:00 BST		Report		Stadium: Arbour Park; Attendance: 1,122

9 May 2023	Marlow	0–1	Bracknell Town	Ascot
19:45 BST		Report		Stadium: Ascot Racecourse; Attendance: 1,007; Referee: Gareth Viccars

15 May 2024	Marlow	1–2	Reading	Sandhurst
19:45 BST	Curtis 56'	Report	Okine-Peters 9'; Akande 19'	Stadium: Bottom Meadow; Attendance: 629; Referee: Oliver Kaya

8 May 2025	Bracknell Town	3-1	Flackwell Heath	Slough
19:45 BST	George 42', 70'; Esprit 57'	Report	Makowski 5'	Stadium: Arbour Park; Attendance: 632; Referee: Stuart Kyle

14 April 2026	Hungerford Town	2–2 (1–4 p)	Wycombe Wanderers	Slough
19:45 GMT	Brandao 88'; Rose 90+8'	Report	McCallum 32'; Savage 39'	Stadium: Arbour Park Stadium; Attendance: 478
	Penalties
	McGrory (penalty missed); Rose (penalty missed); Francis (penalty scored)		(penalty scored) Stones; (penalty scored) Olabiyi; (penalty scored) Lutonadio; (penalty scored) Savage

== See also ==
In addition to the BBFA County Senior Cup, the Berks & Bucks FA also run the following competitions, which are also often referred to as the "Berks & Bucks FA County Cup":

- BBFA County Senior Trophy
- BBFA County Intermediate Cup
- BBFA County Junior Cup
- BBFA County Sunday Intermediate Cup
- BBFA County Sunday Junior Cup
- BBFA County Sunday Junior Trophy
- BBFA County Women's Senior Cup
- BBFA County Women's Trophy
- BBFA County Girls Cup (Under 14)
- BBFA County Girls Cup (Under 16)
- BBFA County Girls Cup (Under 18)
- BBFA County Minor Cup (Under 12)
- BBFA County Minor Cup (Under 13)
- BBFA County Minor Cup (Under 14)
- BBFA County Minor Cup (Under 15)
- BBFA County Minor Cup (Under 16)
- BBFA County Youth Cup
