= Tommy Stewart (footballer, born 1881) =

English footballer

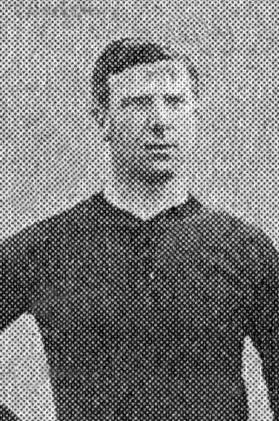
- Stewart while with Brentford in 1909.

Personal information
- Full name: Thomas Worley Stewart
- Date of birth: 18 February 1881
- Place of birth: Sunderland, England
- Date of death: 3 November 1955 (aged 74)
- Place of death: Sunderland, England
- Position: Full back

Senior career*
Years	Team	Apps	(Gls)
1903–1904	Sunderland Royal Rovers		
1904–1905	Sunderland	3	(0)
1905	Portsmouth		
1905–1906	Sunderland Royal Rovers		
1906–1908	Clapton Orient	50	(0)
1908–1909	Brighton & Hove Albion	39	(0)
1909–1910	Brentford	14	(0)
1910–1911	Wingate Albion		
1911–1912	Clapton Orient		
- * Club domestic league appearances and goals

Thomas Worley Stewart (18 February 1881 – 3 November 1955) was an English professional footballer who played as a full back in the Football League for Clapton Orient and Sunderland.

== Career statistics ==
Appearances and goals by club, season and competition
Club	Season	League			FA Cup		Total	
Club	Season	Division	Apps	Goals	Apps	Goals	Apps	Goals
Sunderland	1904–05	First Division	3	0	2	0	5	0
Brighton & Hove Albion	1908–09	Southern League First Division	39	0	1	0	40	0
Brentford	1909–10	Southern League First Division	14	0	0	0	14	0
Career total			56	0	3	0	59	0
