= Whiteheads F.C. =

- Full name: Whiteheads Football Club
- Nickname: the Torpedomen
- Founded: 1891
- Dissolved: 1951
- Ground: Park Mead
Home colours

Whiteheads F.C. – also known as Whitehead or Weymouth Whiteheads – was an association football club from Weymouth, Dorset, which entered the FA Cup and the FA Amateur Cup, mostly in the 1900s.

== History ==
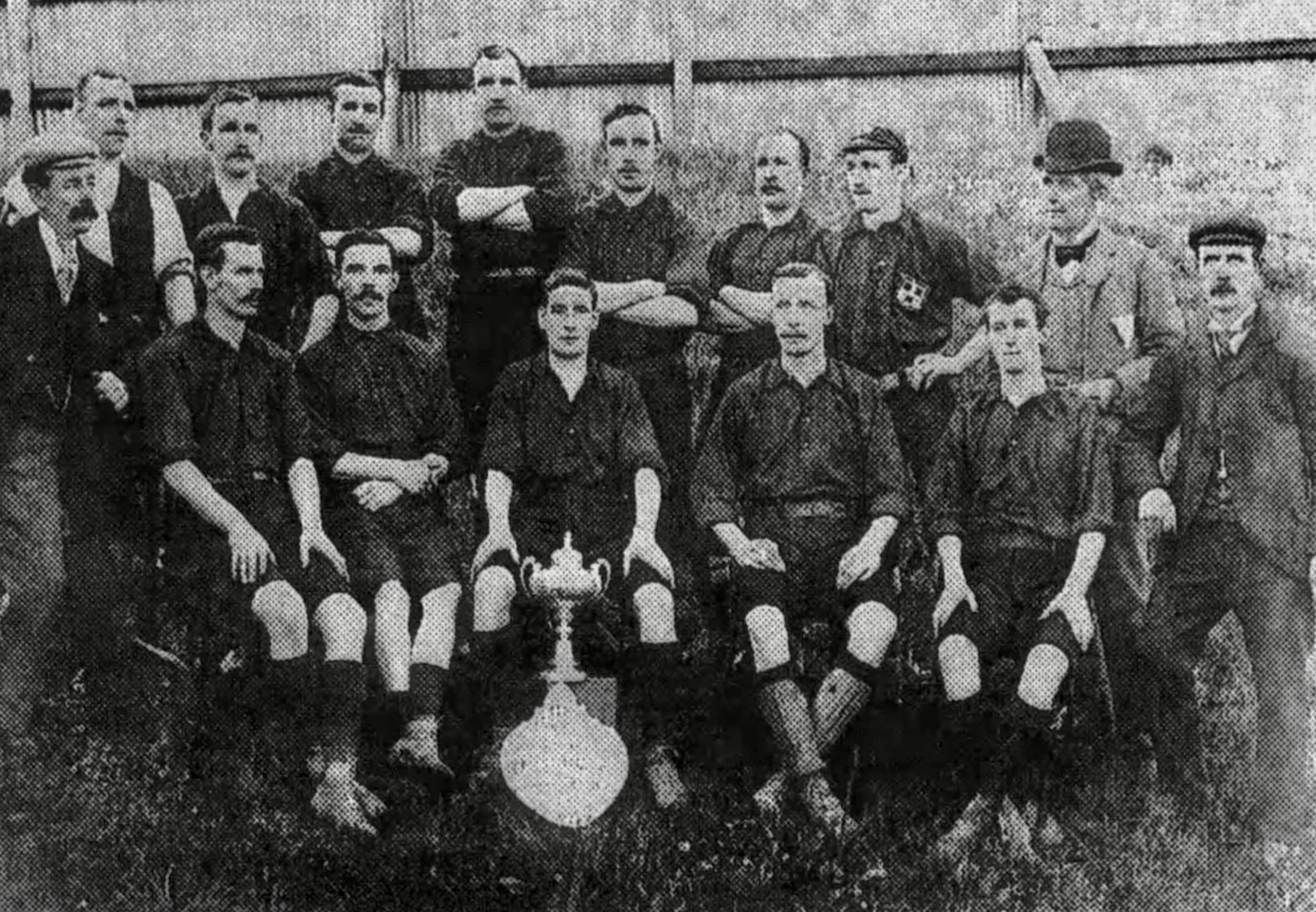
Whiteheads F.C., 1897, with the Dorset League trophy

The club was the works football side of the Whitehead Torpedo Works in Ferrybridge, and was founded, as Whiteheads Athletic Football Club, in 1891. Its first success was in the 1893–94 Dorset Junior Cup, beating Blandford's second XI 4–3 in the final.

Whiteheads won the Dorset Senior Cup in 1900–01, beating Poole in the final. It also had success in the Dorset Football League, winning the title six times between 1896–97 and 1906–07. The club finished the 1904–05 season top of the table jointly with a side from the Warwickshire Regiment.

On a national level, the club entered the FA Cup from 1901–02 to 1909–10. It twice came close to playing in the proper rounds of the FA Cup. In 1902–03, it reached the fifth and final qualifying round, the equivalent in 2025 of the second round proper. Drawn at home to the professional Swindon Town, though, Whiteheads went down 9–0. In 1907–08, it reached the fourth qualifying round, but lost 5–4 at home to Paulton Rovers; Whiteheads lost one of its halves to injury early on, but still took a two-goal lead, before the visitors levelled the score by the break.

It was also successful in the Amateur Cup, reaching the quarter-finals in 1901-02 and 1903–04; both times it lost in a replay, the first time to Ilford, the second to Cheshunt. It was particularly unlucky against Ilford, as full-back Osborne broke a leg in the second half, and it still took extra-time for the London side to beat the ten men.

The club's momentum was shattered in 1909, when, following a Dorset FA enquiry into illegal payments being made at Weymouth F.C., both the Weymouth and Whiteheads teams were suspended. The commission ultimately found that Whiteheads hadnot kept proper books, deliberately to hide payments being made to supposedly amateur players; the chairman Mr Lumley, plus a number of other officials, were suspended sine die, and 17 players were declared to be professionals, and thus barred from playing amateur football, the suspension ending the following season. This forced the club's expulsion from the FA Cup, and it reverted to low-key works matches until the Second World War. During the war, the club started a women's football team, which played for charitable purposes, travelling as far as Coventry for matches.

In 1945–46, Whiteheads entered the Amateur Cup once more, losing to Chippenham Town in the second qualifying round. The last fixtures recorded for the club are from the 1950–51 season.

== Colours ==
Whiteheads' original colours were all dark blue; at some time in the 20th century it changed to blue and gold.

== Ground ==
The club's ground was Park Mead, near its factory in Wyke.

== Notable players ==
Forward Harry Griffin so impressed a visiting Aston Villa – when Griffin was playing for the Dorset representative side – that Villa signed him up, but a knee injury ended his career after he had played just one game.
