= Bill Berry (footballer, born 1882) =

English footballer

Personal information
- Full name: William Alexander Berry
- Date of birth: July 1882
- Place of birth: Monkwearmouth, England
- Date of death: 1 March 1943 (aged 60)
- Height: 5 ft 7 in (1.70 m)
- Positions: Outside right; centre forward

Youth career
- Oakhill
- Sunderland Royal Rovers

Senior career*
Years	Team	Apps	(Gls)
1902–1903	Sunderland	0	(0)
1903–1906	Tottenham Hotspur	18	(1)
1906–1909	Manchester United	13	(1)
1909–1910	Stockport County	14	(3)
- Sunderland Royal Rovers
- * Club domestic league appearances and goals

William Alexander Berry (July 1882 – 1 March 1943) was an English footballer who played as a forward. Born in Sunderland, he played for Sunderland, Tottenham Hotspur, Manchester United and Stockport County.
