= John Hawtrey =

English footballer

Personal information
- Full name: John Purvis Hawtrey
- Date of birth: 19 July 1850
- Place of birth: Eton, England
- Date of death: 17 August 1925 (aged 75)
- Position: Goalkeeper

Senior career*
Years	Team	Apps	(Gls)
- Old Etonians

International career
1881	England	2	(0)
- * Club domestic league appearances and goals

John Purvis Hawtrey (19 July 1850 – 17 August 1925) was an English amateur footballer who earned two caps for the national team in 1881 playing as a goalkeeper.

== Career ==
His football career started with Remnants F.C. and he later played for Old Etonians, with whom he won the FA Cup in 1879.

His international appearances both came in 1881, against Wales and Scotland. England lost both games and Hawtrey conceded a total of seven goals.

== Personal life ==
He was born at Eton College, where his father, the Reverend John Hawtrey, was master of the lower school. His younger brother was the actor, Sir Charles Hawtrey.

He was a tutor for a time and later, a journalist. He also wrote plays under the pseudonym John Trent-Hay.

He was married twice, first to Mary Harriot Siddons in 1885. Mary died in 1890 and he later married Emma Newton in 1896.
