= Maidenhead Norfolkians F.C. =

Former association football club in England

- Full name: Maidenhead Norfolkians Football Club
- Nicknames: The Norfolks, The Norfolkians, The Red and Whites
- Founded: 1884
- Dissolved: 1919
- Ground: Kidwells Park
- Chairman: Alfred Leaver
- 1913/14: Great Western Suburban League 2nd
1905–06 colours

Maidenhead Norfolkians F.C. was an association football club based in Maidenhead, Berkshire, active from 1884 until 1919. The combined club continued as Maidenhead F.C. before being renamed Maidenhead United for the 1920–21 season.

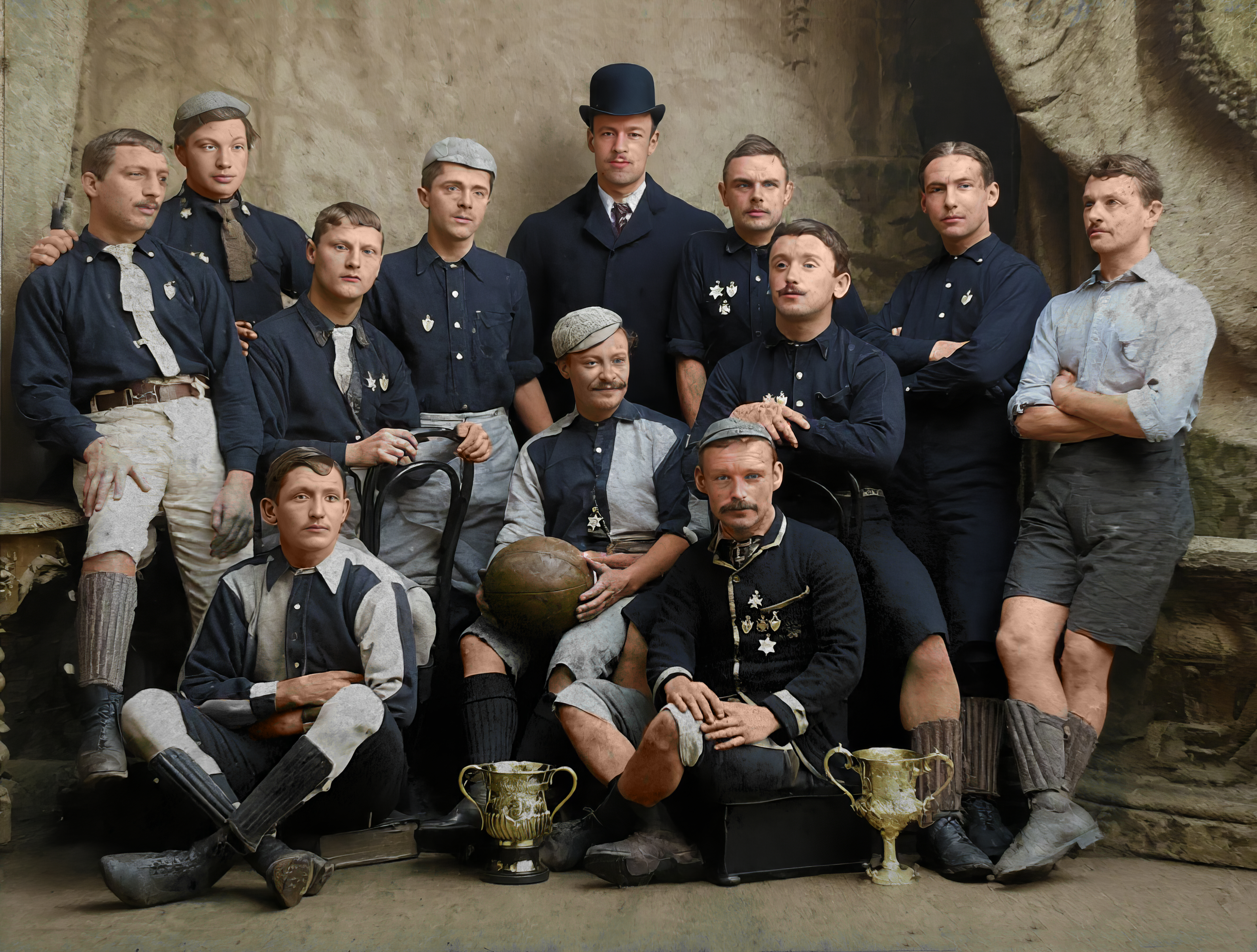
Maidenhead Norfolkians F.C. from 1892, with modern colourisation

== History ==
The club was founded in 1884, at the home of Harry Maisey, who was involved with the club for almost its entire existence, only standing down as secretary in 1913. Its earliest recorded match is a 1–0 win over Marlow Star in October 1884, and the club derived its name from either Norfolk Park or the Norfolk Road, in the north of the town, which passed close to its ground.

Its first notable achievement was reaching the final of the Berks & Bucks Junior Cup in 1888–89, the Norfolkians going down 1–0 to the Marlow reserves. By the time it won the Junior Cup competition for the first time, in 1898–99, the club had won their own Charity Cup five times, the High Wycombe Challenge Cup four times, and the South Bucks & East Berks Junior League four times.

=== Original merger with Maidenhead ===
In consequence of its Junior Cup triumph, it stepped up to senior football in 1899–1900. That originally only lasted one season, the club entering into an arrangement with Maidenhead in 1900; that saw the Norfolkians returning to Junior football, with a view to a deeper amalgamation in short order; the arrangement saw the Norfolkians cede the 1900–01 FA Cup qualifying rounds tie to Maidenhead. However the arrangement only lasted one season, the Norfolkians withdrawing after its gate receipts dropped from £47 to £20. The rivalry between the two sides occasionally spilled into violence; after one match in March 1903, the Norfolkians' Frank Moore was fined £1 for assaulting a Maidenhead supporter. The Norfolkians did at least get some revenge for having to withdraw from the Cup by beating Maidenhead in the 1902–03 FA Cup qualifying rounds.

=== Separation and success ===
In 1904, the club was a founder member of the Great Western Suburban League, alongside Maidenhead; the club remained a member until the First World War, its best season being a runner-up finish in its first season. It was also a member of the Berks & Bucks League, which the Norfolkians won in 1904–05, along with the Oxford Hospital Cup, "the finest football trophy in the kingdom".

The club was also a regular competitor in the Berks & Bucks Senior Cup, and reached the final in 1905–06, although the game ended in defeat to Reading Amateurs - not helped by Moore, now club captain, being sent off for (again) striking a spectator. The Norfolkians went one better in 1906–07, winning the Cup thanks to a 3–0 final replay win over Marlow at the Dolphin Ground in Slough, as well as the Oxford Charity Cup and Berks League, and club president Ernest Gardner MP entertained the club to dinner in the Swan Hotel to celebrate. The club's last final appearance was in 1912–13, the trophy going to Wycombe Wanderers after a replay and extra-time at Marlow's ground - Wycombe's winning goal coming in the 119th minute when Allen in goal twice fumbled a shot and the ball was forced over the line in a scramble.

The Norfolkians also chanced their arm in national competition, entering the FA Cup and FA Amateur Cup from 1899 to 1914. It never reached the first round of the former, and its best run in the latter came in 1907–08, when it reached the last 16; at that stage the Norfolkians lost 6–2 at home to Ilford.

In the final pre-war season the Norfolkians finished runners up in the Great Western Suburban League, three places ahead of Maidenhead FC. The Norfolkians had won 26 of the 40 league and cup matches played between the clubs in the previous 15 years, losing only 9.

The club's AGM in August 1914 reported a balance of over £6.

=== War time ===
During the First World War, the Norfolkians combined forces with Maidenhead F.C. to raise money for the war effort by staging regular matches and competing in tournaments against teams of troops stationed in the area. They lent their kit to the 10th Yorkshire Light Infantry, whilst Chairman Alfred Leaver acted as a referee. Club secretary Ernest Smith was killed in action in France in October 1918.

=== Final merger ===
The club was expected to rejoin the local leagues after the First World War, but, as both clubs had lost playing members during the conflict, the Norfolkians instead amalgamated with Maidenhead F.C.. Alfred Leaver, formerly of the Norfolkians, became chairman, while founding member Harry Maisey also played a role in running the 'new' club. The team's colours changed from 'red and black' to 'black and white' to better reflect the history of both clubs. Three former Norfolkian players were named in the line-up for the first post-war league match, compared with just one from Maidenhead F.C. The team played all of its competitive first-team matches at the Norfolkians' ground in Kidwells Park, except for its final league fixture against 1st Scots Guards at York Road, and won the 1919–20 Great Western Suburban League. The season ended with defeat to Slough in the County Cup final at Wycombe.

As with previous attempts at amalgamation, many on the Norfolkians' side were unhappy with their role in the project, and after one season, a faction once again proposed withdrawing. However, a further vote on continuing the amalgamation was carried by a large majority, and the Norfolkian name continued only through the Maidenhead Norfolkian Cup. Maidenhead F.C. was renamed Maidenhead United at the start of the 1920–21 season and has since played all of its home games at York Road.

== Colours ==
The earliest colours attributed to the club were dark and light blue, which were also the colours of the Berks & Bucks Football Association. For most of its history, however, the Norfolkians wore red and white. They wore red and white hoops, for example, while competing in the 1905–06 Oxford Hospital Cup, and red and white stripes during a tour of the Channel Islands in December 1908. Red and white remain part of the Maidenhead United kit to this day: the Magpies usually wear red socks with their home kit, while their change kit has occasionally featured red, most recently in the 2025–26 season.

== Ground ==
The club's first match was played on Mr Bond's meadow in Maidenhead. By 1886, the club had moved to Kidwells Park, which was the club's home for the rest of its existence.

== Notable players ==
- George "Daisy" Hancock, who went on to play for Reading F.C. in 1908
