= Remnants F.C. =

English Football club

Remnants
- Full name: Remnants Football Club
- Founded: 1877
- Dissolved: 1882
- Ground: Aldin House, Slough
- Secretary: Charles Hawtrey
Home colours

Remnants F.C. was an English association football club, made up of masters from St Mark's School in Windsor.

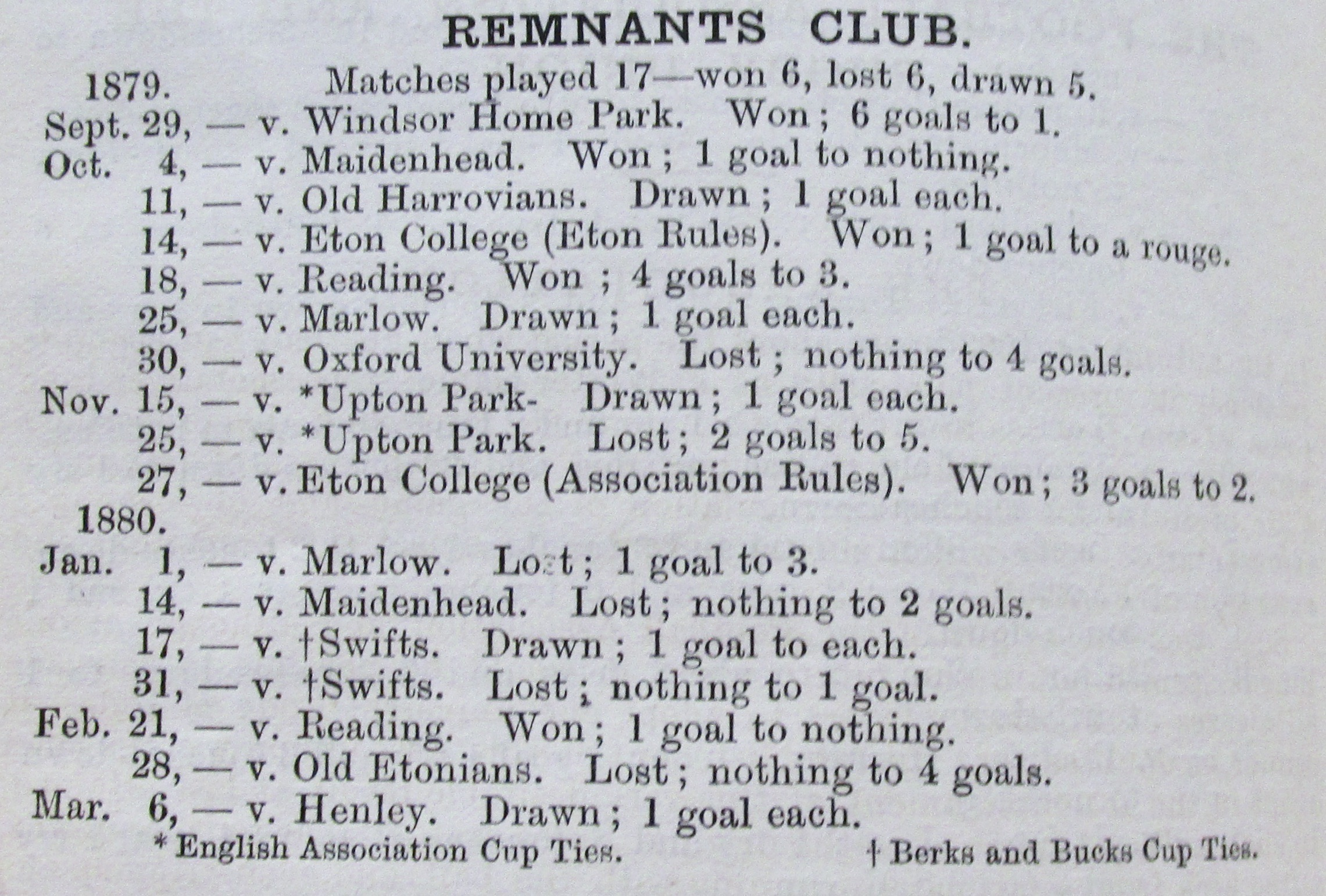
Remnants results for 1879–80, Charles Alcock Football Annual 1880

== History ==
The club's first reported match was its first-ever FA Cup tie, against St Stephens of Westminster. Although a new club, many of the Remnants players had played for Windsor Home Park F.C. and the St Mark's side in the previous season.

The club competed in the FA Cup in the 1870s. Its most successful run in the competition came in its first entry, in 1877–78, when it won two ties for the only time; in the first round it beat St Stephen's 4–0 at home, all of the goals coming in the first half, and the first goal being scored after the Remnants had twice put the ball through the goal - one being disallowed as a free kick from Charles Hawtrey had gone straight into the goal (the law at the time making all free-kicks indirect) and the second for "palpably infringing" the offside rule. In the second round the club won 2–0 at Hawks of Anerley, helped by an injury to the home side's Jones after 15 minutes which rendered him a passenger. The run ended at the Kennington Oval in the third round, Upton Park taking an easy 3–0 win, a fourth goal at the call of time being disallowed because a spectator had kicked the ball from behind the touchline back into play.

The club also reached the third round in 1878–79, albeit after receiving a walkover; in the third round against Darwen, again at the Oval, the score at 90 minutes was 2–2, and, after a lengthy discussion, it was agreed to play half-an-hour extra time. Ten minutes into the first period, a shot by Darwen's Love was deflected off "an unhappy Remnant" and William Hawtrey in goal was wrong-footed. The goal proved to be the winner.

The club tended to enter the FA Cup in years Windsor Home Park did not do so, although in 1880–81 and 1881–82 both teams did so. The club's last entry was in 1882–83, but it scratched when drawn to play Reading Minster F.C. in the first round, captain T. B. Hughes playing for fellow Slough side the Swifts instead.

The Remnants also entered the Berks & Bucks Senior Cup in the 1880s, reaching the final in 1881, but lost 1–0 to Marlow, who also had two goals disallowed for offside.

== Colours ==
The club's colours were white, with cerise sleeves.

== Ground ==
The club played on a pitch at Aldin House, with a clubhouse on the ground.

== Notable players ==
- John Hawtrey and Edward Hagarty Parry, both capped for England when members of Remnants F.C.
- Charles Hawtrey, who was the club's secretary
- Rev. William Blackmore, goalkeeper, played in the club's first Cup matches in 1877, and was once selected for England
