= Chesham United F.C. =

English football club

Coordinates: 51°41′56″N 0°36′50″W

Chesham United
- Full name: Chesham United Football Club
- Nickname: The Generals
- Founded: 1917
- Ground: The Meadow, Chesham
- Capacity: 5,000 (284 seated)
- Chairman: Peter Brown
- Manager: James Duncan and Michael Murray
- League: National League South
- 2025–26: National League South, 11th of 24
Home colours	Away colours

Chesham United Football Club is a semi-professional football club in Chesham, Buckinghamshire, England. Nicknamed "the Generals", they are currently members of the National League South and play at the Meadow. They are sponsored by the Channel 4 programme Taskmaster.

== History ==
The club was established in 1917 by a merger of Chesham Town and Chesham Generals. The new club joined the Spartan League in 1919, which the Generals had been members of prior to World War I. They won back-to-back league titles in 1921–22 and 1922–23, and were champions again in 1924–25. League reorganisation in 1928 saw them placed in Division One West. However, the following season saw them placed in the Premier Division after further reorganisation, and they were league runners-up in 1929–30, before going on to win the league in 1932–33. During World War II they played in the Great Western Combination.

When the league resumed after the war, Chesham were placed in the Western Division of the Spartan League for the 1945–46 season. The league was reduced to a single division for the 1946–47 season, after which the club switched to the Corinthian League. They were runners-up in 1960–61 and 1961–62, but the league disbanded in 1963 and together with the majority of clubs in the league, Chesham were founder member of the new Division One of the Athenian League. In 1966–67 the club reached the first round of the FA Cup for the first time, losing 6–0 at Enfield. The following season saw them reach the final of the FA Amateur Cup, losing 1–0 to Leytonstone at Wembley Stadium. Another FA Cup first round appearance in 1968–69 ended with a 5–0 defeat at Colchester United.

In 1973 Chesham switched to Division Two of the Isthmian League, which was renamed Division One in 1977. They reached the FA Cup first round again in 1976–77, losing 2–0 at Brentford. In 1979–80 the club progressed beyond the FA Cup first round for the first time; after beating Minehead 2–1 in the first round, they defeated Merthyr Tydfil 3–1 in a second round replay, before losing 2–0 at home to Cambridge United in the third round. A fifth appearance in the first round in 1982–83 resulted in a 1–0 defeat by Yeovil Town. The club were relegated to Division Two North at the end of the 1985–86 season, but won the division at the first attempt and were promoted back to Division One.

The 1990–91 season saw Chesham win Division One, earning promotion to the Premier Division. They went on to win the Premier Division in 1992–93, but were denied promotion to the Football Conference due to their ground failing to meet the necessary criteria. The club were subsequently relegated back to Division One at the end of the 1994–95 season, although they did reach the FA Cup first round, losing 1–0 to Bashley. However, they returned to the Premier Division after winning Division One in 1996–97. Following relegation to Division One North at the end of the 2002–03 season, the club finished fourth in 2003–04, earning promotion back to the same level, although they were transferred to the Premier Division of the Southern League.

Chesham finished bottom of the Southern League Premier Division in 2005–06, resulting in relegation to Division One South & West. After one season in the division they were transferred to Division One Midlands. A fifth-place finish in 2008–09 saw them qualify for the promotion play-offs, in which they lost 2–1 to Nuneaton Town in the semi-finals. They reached the play-offs again the following season with a fourth-place finish, and after beating Burnham 1–0 in the semi-finals, they defeated Slough Town 4–0 in the final to earn promotion back to the Premier Division.

The club went on to qualify for the Premier Division promotion play-offs in 2011–12, losing 3–2 to AFC Totton in the semi-finals. The following season resulted in another play-off qualification, this time losing 2–0 to Hemel Hempstead Town in the semi-finals. A third successive play-off campaign was secured when they finished as Premier Division runners-up in 2013–14, but after beating Stourbridge 2–1 in the semi-finals, they lost 3–1 to St Albans City in the final. The following season saw them reach the first round of the FA Cup for the first time since 1994, and after beating Bristol Rovers 1–0, they were beaten 4–0 by Bradford City in the second round. In 2016–17 another first round appearance resulted in a 2–1 defeat at Peterborough United.

At the end of the 2017–18 season Chesham were placed in the Premier Division South due to league reorganisation. They finished fifth in 2022–23 and qualified for the promotion playoffs, but lost 1–0 to Bracknell Town in the semi-finals. The following season they were Premier Division South champions, earning promotion to the National League South.

In 2022 comedian Alex Horne was appointed a director of the club, whose ground had previously appeared as a location in his television series Taskmaster. In the 2022–23 season Taskmaster became the club's shirt sponsor. In the series 20 episode "Thompson", contestants were tasked with creating miniature representations of Chesham's mascot.

== Reserve team ==
Chesham United reserves played in the Great Western Suburban League in the 1919–20 season, before joining the new Division Two of the Spartan League, a year after the first team had joined the league. They were Division Two champions in 1921–22, the same year as the first team won Division One. When a second Division Two was added in 1925, they became members of Division Two A. League reorganisation in 1928 saw them placed in Division Two West. They did not rejoin the league after World War II.

After playing in the Suburban League, in 2010 the reserve team joined Division One of the Spartan South Midlands League. They left the league at the end of the 2016–17 season.

== Current squad ==
As of 24 August 2026

Note: Flags indicate national team as defined under FIFA eligibility rules; some limited exceptions apply. Players may hold more than one non-FIFA nationality.

No.	Pos.	Nation	Player
1	GK	ENG	Ben Goode
3	DF	ENG	Alex Lafleur
4	DF	ENG	Alfie Young
5	DF	ENG	Steve Brown (captain)
6	DF	ENG	Connor Stevens
7	FW	ENG	Karl Oliyide
8	MF	ENG	Giorgio Rasulo
9	FW	FRA	Hisham Kasimu
10	MF	ENG	Jayden Bennetts
11	FW	ENG	Craig Fasanmade
12	DF	ENG	Aaron Lacey (on loan from Oxford United)
13	GK	ENG	Kai Mussilhy
14	FW	ENG	Mitchell Weiss
15	DF	ENG	Harry Hoath

No.	Pos.	Nation	Player
16	MF	WAL	Joe Andrews (on loan from Peterborough United)
17	DF	ENG	Callum Adebiyi
18	MF	ENG	Alex Babos
19	MF	ENG	Ryan Upward
20	DF	ENG	Connor Roberts
21	FW	ENG	Dubem Eze
22	DF	ENG	Joseph Adewunmi
24	MF	ENG	Oliver Deurell Benito
25	MF	ENG	Will St Clair-Burton
26	DF	ENG	Lordon Akolbire
28	MF	ENG	Matt Lench
31	MF	ENG	Alfie Williams
33	DF	ENG	Charlie Morris

== Non-playing staff ==
As of 12 June 2026

Position	Staff
Joint Manager	James Duncan
Joint Manager	Michael Murray
Assistant Manager	Mick Johnson
First team Coach	Matt McClure
Goalkeeping Coach	Mark Phillips
Head of Recruitment	Finlay Johnson
Head of Medical	Matt Loomes
Sports Rehabilitator	Jaydene London
Kit Manager	Pete Howes

== Honours ==
- Isthmian League
  - Premier Division champions 1992–93
  - Division One champions 1990–91, 1996–97
  - Division Two North champions 1986–87
- Southern Football League
  - Premier Division South champions 2023–24
- Spartan League
  - Champions 1921–22, 1922–23, 1924–25, 1932–33
  - Division Two champions 1921–22
- Athenian League
  - Memorial Cup winners 1963–64, 1968–69
- Berks & Bucks Senior Cup
  - Winners 1921–22, 1925–26, 1928–29, 1933–34, 1947–48, 1950–51, 1964–65, 1966–67, 1975–76, 1991–92, 1992–93, 2000–01, 2003–04, 2007–08, 2013–14, 2017–18

== Records ==
- Best FA Cup performance: Third round, 1979–80
- Best FA Amateur Cup performance: Runners-up, 1967–68
- Best FA Trophy performance: Fourth round, 1998–99
- Record attendance: 5,000 vs Cambridge United, FA Cup third round, 5 December 1979
- Most appearances: Martin Baguley
- Most goals: John Willis
- Record transfer fee received: £22,000 from Oldham Athletic for Fitz Hall, 2002

== See also ==
- Chesham United F.C. managers
- Chesham United F.C. players
