= South Reading F.C. =

South Reading
- Full name: South Reading F.C.
- Nickname: The Southerners
- Founded: 1878
- Dissolved: 1894?
- Ground: Whitley Park Farm
- Secretary: Rev. J. E. Smith
Home colours

South Reading was an English association football club based in Reading.

== History ==
The club gave its foundation date as 1878 and it first entered the FA Cup in 1882–83. In the first round, the club beat Dreadnought F.C., after the Football Association ordered a replay as South Reading had arrived at the West Ham Park ground too late to complete the game in daylight. South Reading repeated their 2–1 win in a "warmly contested" match. The club received a bye to the third round, where they played Hendon, and took an early lead, but then conceded 11 goals without further reply.

The club entered the FA Cup until 1887–88, when the FA introduced qualifying rounds, and the club stopped entering. The club's best run came in 1885–86, despite only playing one game in the season before the competition started. After beating Dulwich F.C. and being awarded the tie against Clapton F.C., who turned up too late to a replay to allow extra time to be played, the club walked over the Clapham Rovers, who refused to play because of poor weather conditions, in the third round; Marlow F.C., Old Wykehamists F.C. and Old Harrovians were expelled from the competition for also refusing to compete, after there had been an extreme frost. The club was unlucky to be one of only four that did not draw a bye in the fourth round, and lost 3–0 at home to Brentwood, at the club's new ground at Mr Colebrook's farm.

The club reached the Berks & Bucks Senior Cup Final in 1886–87, losing to Windsor. The club seems to have disbanded in around 1894, around the time Reading F.C. joined the Southern League, as there was no longer enough support to run an amateur club in the town.

== Colours ==
The club's colours were black shirts with a white Maltese cross.

== Ground ==
The club played at Whitley Park Farm.

== Honours ==
- Reading Challenge Cup
  - Winner: 1881–82, 1882–83, 1885–86, 1886–87, 1888–89
