= Maidenhead United F.C. =

Association football club in Maidenhead, England

Maidenhead United
- Full name: Maidenhead United Football Club
- Nickname: The Magpies
- Founded: October 1870
- Ground: York Road, Maidenhead
- Capacity: 4,000 (550 seated)
- Chairman: Peter Griffin
- Manager: Ryan Peters
- League: National League South
- 2025–26: National League South, 7th of 24
- Website: maidenheadunitedfc.org
Home colours	Away colours

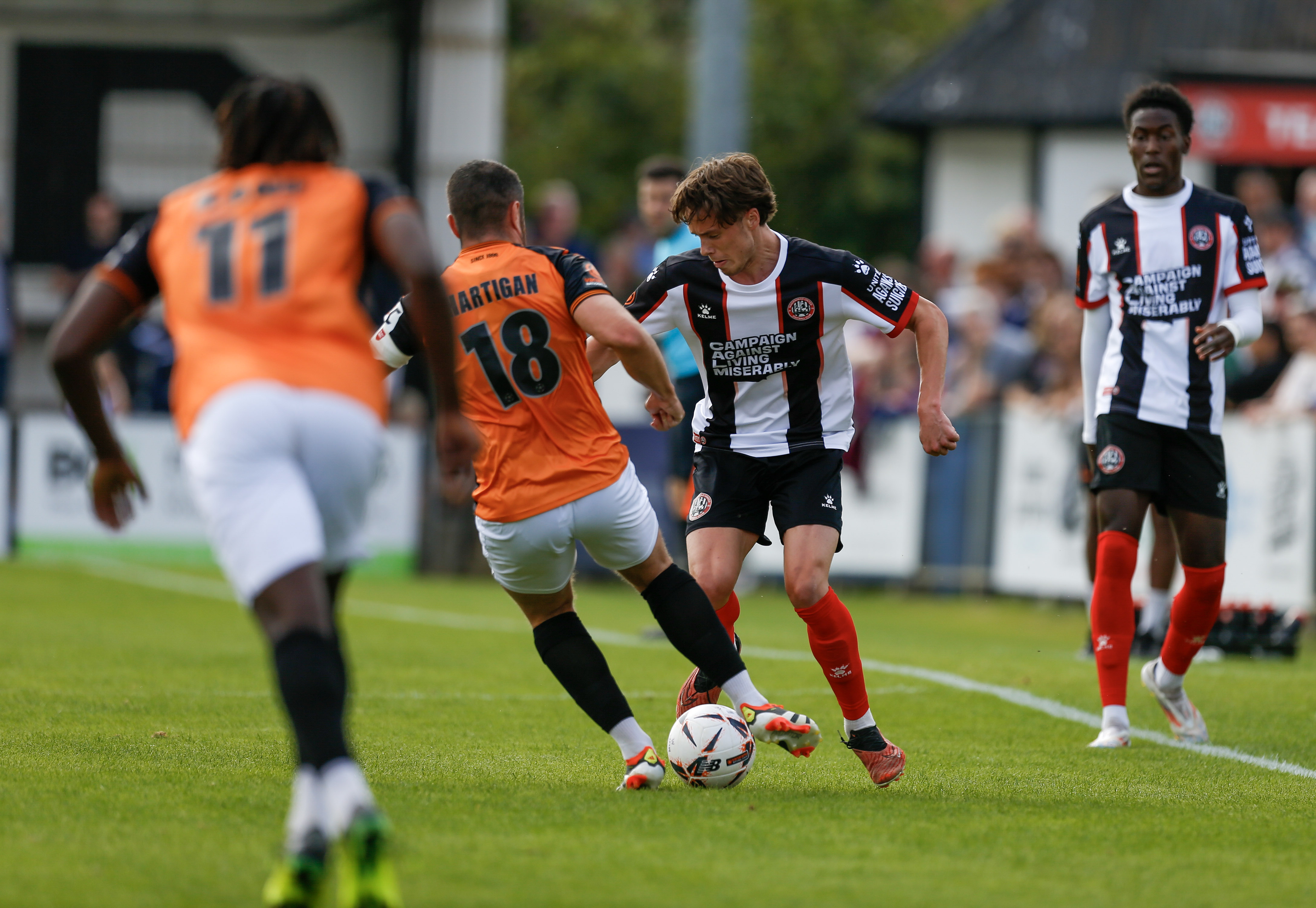
Maidenhead United take on Barnet at York Road on 26 August 2024

Maidenhead United Football Club is a semi-professional football club based in Maidenhead, Berkshire, England. Affiliated to the Berks & Bucks FA, they are currently members of the National League South.

The club were established in October 1870 and have played at York Road since 1871, making it the 'oldest senior football ground continuously used by the same club'. In 1871–72 they were one of the fifteen clubs to play in the inaugural FA Cup. The club went on to reach the FA Cup quarter finals three times in the 1870s, before becoming founder members of the Southern League in 1894. They subsequently played in the Great Western Suburban League (1904–1922), Spartan League (1922–1939), Corinthian League (1945–1963), Athenian League (1963–1973), Isthmian League (1973–2004), and National League South before returning to the Southern League for a season in 2006–07. They played in the National League from 2017 to 2025, when they were relegated back to the National League South.

== History ==
Maidenhead Football Club was established in October 1870, with the club's first match played on 17 December 1870 against Windsor Home Park at Bond's Meadow. They were one of the fifteen clubs to play in the inaugural FA Cup competition in 1871–72, beating Marlow 2–0 in the first round before losing 3–0 at Crystal Palace. The club reached the quarter finals the following season, eventually losing 4–0 to Oxford University. The club were quarter-finalists again in 1873–74 – losing 7–0 at Royal Engineers – and 1874–75, when they were beaten 1–0 at Old Etonians. Maidenhead Temperance and Boyne Hill both merged into the club in 1891.

Maidenhead were founder members of the Southern League in 1894, joining Division Two. They finished bottom of the division in its inaugural season and again in 1898–99 and 1899–1900, before leaving the league in 1902. The club subsequently dropped into the West Berkshire League and the Berks and Bucks League. They won the West Berkshire League at the first attempt and were runners-up in 1903–04, before joining the new Great Western Suburban League alongside Maidenhead Norfolkians in 1904.

Following a meeting in April 1919 the Maidenhead merged with Norfolkians after both clubs lost seven players during the war. The merged club played in black and white shirts to reflect the history of both clubs and subsequently became known as the Magpies. They won the Great Western Suburban League in 1919–20, after which the club was renamed Maidenhead United. They were runners-up in the Great Western Suburban League in 1920–21, before joining Division One of the Spartan League in 1922. The club won the Division One title in 1926–27, before being placed in Division One West in 1928 amidst league reorganisation. They were Division One West runners-up in 1928–29 before being placed in the Premier Division the following season.

Maidenhead were Premier Division runners-up in 1930–31 and went on to win the league the following season. Although the club finished in the bottom half of the table in 1932–33, they won the Premier Division title for a second time in 1933–34. In 1935–36 they reached the semi-finals of the FA Amateur Cup, losing 4–1 to Ilford at Upton Park. After the outbreak of World War II in 1939, the club joined the Great Western Combination, finishing as runners-up in 1944–45. They then joined the newly formed Corinthian League. The club won the league's Memorial Shield in 1956–57 and were league champions the following season. In 1960–61 they reached the first round of the FA Cup for the first time since the formation of the Football League, losing 5–0 at Colchester United; the club went on to win the Corinthian League for a second time at the end of the season. After winning the league again in 1960–61, they won the league and Memorial Shield double in 1961–62.

Another FA Cup first round appearance followed in 1962–63, ending with a 3–0 defeat at home to Wycombe Wanderers. In 1963 the Corinthian League merged into the Athenian League, with Maidenhead becoming members of the Premier Division. In their first season in the new league the club reached the first round of the FA Cup again, losing 2–0 at home to Bath City. A fourth FA Cup first round appearance in 1971–72 saw them lose 2–0 at Enfield. In 1973 the club joined Division Two of the Isthmian League, which was renamed Division One in 1977. They were relegated to Division Two South at the end of the 1986–87 season, where they remained until finishing as runners-up in 1990–91, earning promotion back to Division One. In 1996–97 the club won the league's Full Members Cup.

A third-place finish in Division One in 1999–2000 saw Maidenhead promoted to the Premier Division. In 2003–04 they finished twelfth in the Premier Division, earning a place in the new Conference South. However, after finishing bottom of the division in 2005–06, the club were relegated to the Premier Division of the Southern League. The following season saw them reach the FA Cup first round for the first time since the 1970s, losing 2–0 at Stafford Rangers in a replay; they also finished fourth in the Premier Division qualifying for the promotion play-offs; the club went on to defeat King's Lynn 1–0 in the semi-finals before beating Team Bath by the same scoreline in the final to secure promotion back to the Conference South. Another FA Cup first round appearance in 2007–08 ended with a 4–1 defeat at Horsham. They reached the first round again in 2011–12 (losing 2–0 to Aldershot Town in a replay) and 2015–16 (losing 3–1 at home to Port Vale in another replay).

In 2016–17 Maidenhead won the renamed National League South, earning promotion to the National League. In their first season in the division, another FA Cup first round appearance saw them lose 2–0 at Coventry City. They reached the first round again in 2019–20, losing 3–1 at home to Rotherham United. The 2019–20 National League season was officially curtailed on 31 March 2020 due to the COVID-19 pandemic, requiring the outcome of the final table to be decided on a points per game basis. Maidenhead were narrowly spared from relegation to the National League South after Ebbsfleet United were relegated by 0.002 of a point. After finishing third-from-bottom of the National League in 2024–25 Maidenhead were relegated to the National League South. They finished seventh in the division the following season, before losing 2–0 to Dorking Wanderers in the play-off quarter-finals.

== Other teams ==
Maidenhead United Women were formed in 2008. Following two promotions, the club have operated at Tier 4 of women's football in England since 2015, competing in FA Women's National League Division 1 South West.

Maidenhead United Juniors was founded in 2019 and currently runs more than 60 teams providing football for youngsters between the ages of 6 and 18 across various local leagues in Berkshire and Buckinghamshire.

Maidenhead United also has men's and women's futsal teams, following the rebrand of Reading Royals Futsal Club. The men's team currently plays in National Futsal Series Tier 1, the highest division of English futsal, and includes current England international players Jack Walsh and Harry Tozer. The women's team currently plays in Women's Super Series Tier 2, the second division of English futsal.

== Colours ==
The club's original colours were red and black hooped jerseys. In 1919, after the merger with Norfolkians, the club colours were changed to black and white to represent the history of both clubs.

== Ground ==
A plaque at York Road commemorates its recognition by The Football Association as the oldest football ground in continuous use by the same senior club.

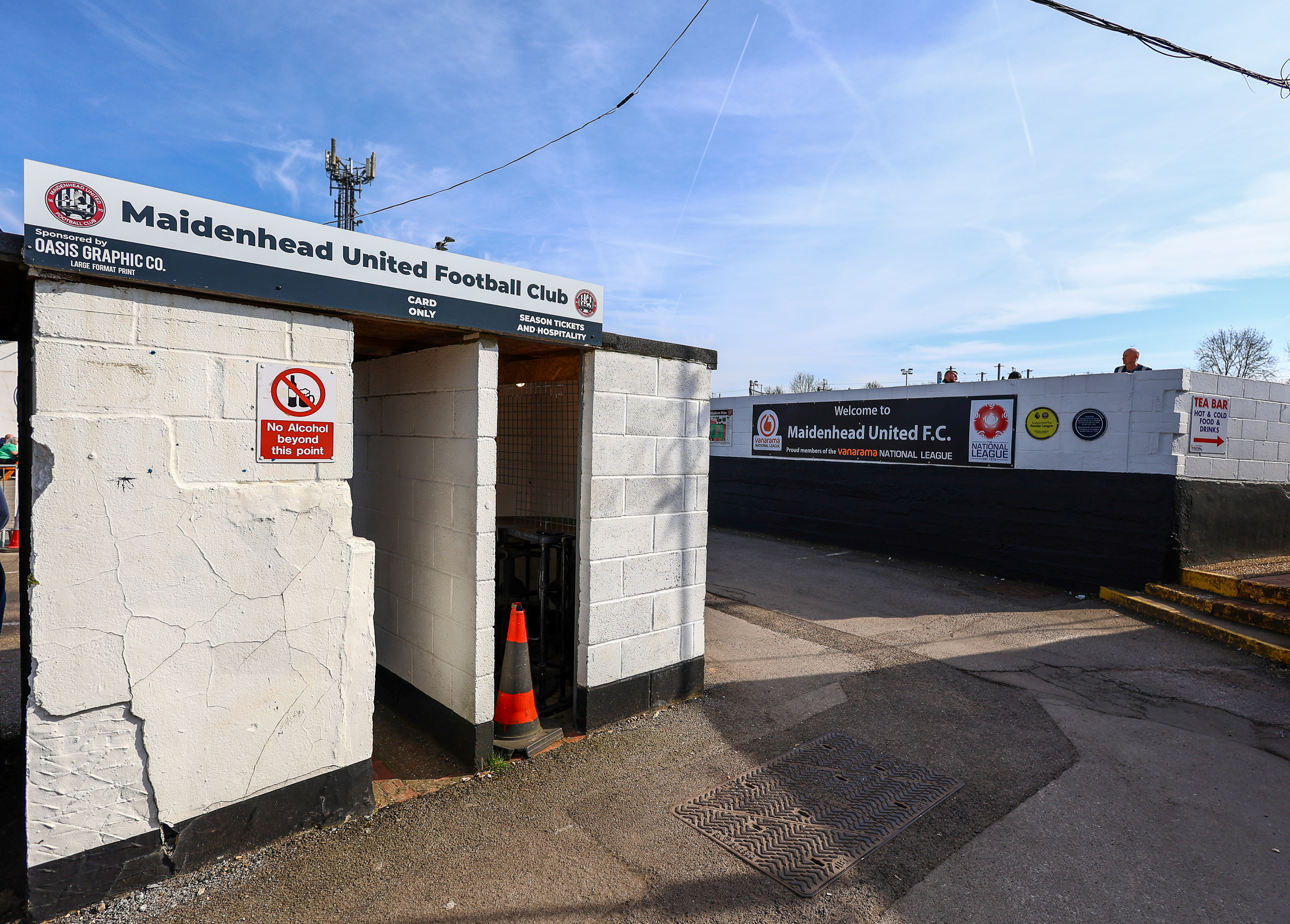
York Road Maidenhead United FC

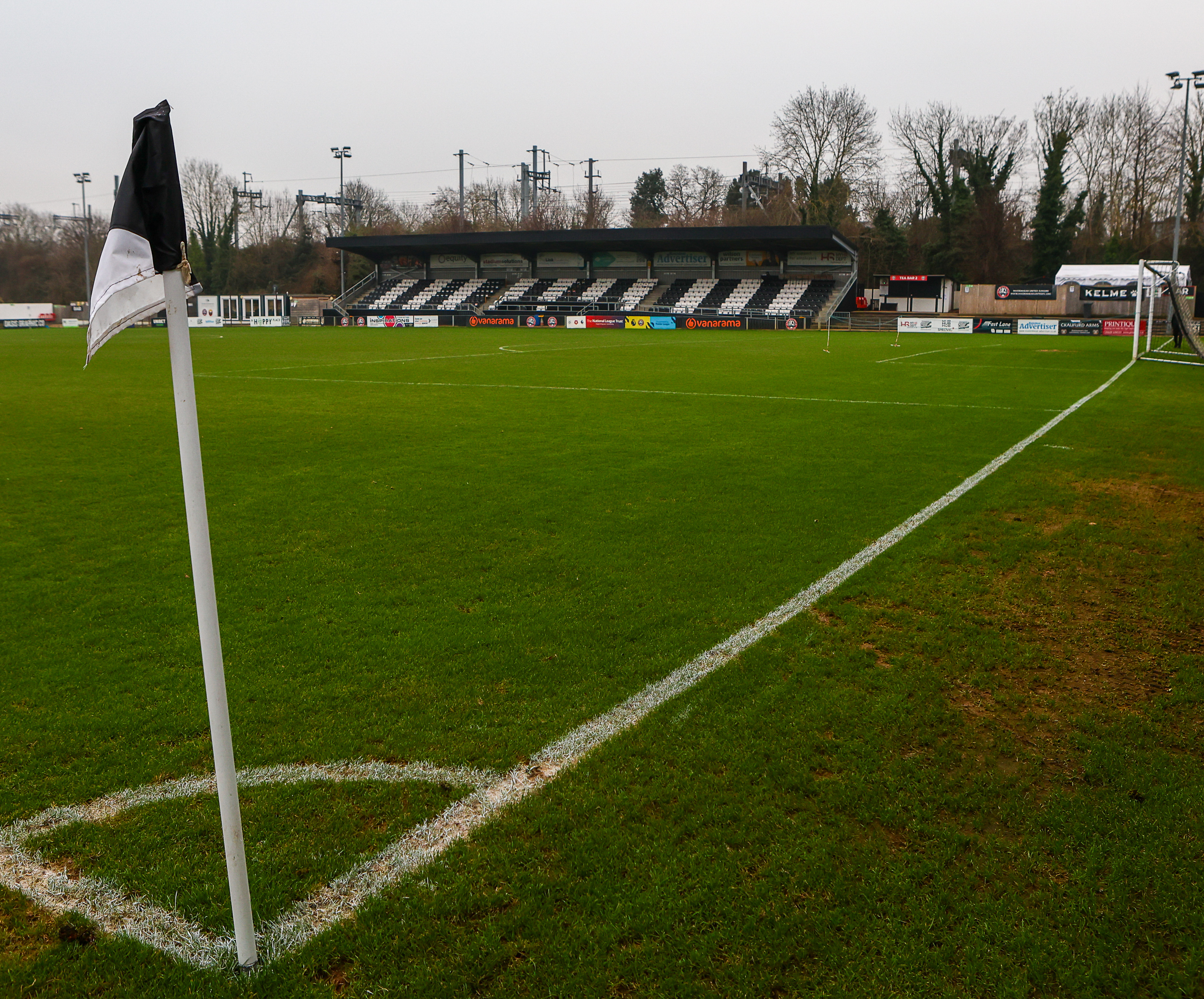
The Railway Stand at York Road

The club played their first home match at Bond's Meadow, before moving to York Road in 1871, with the first match at the new ground played on 16 February 1871 against Marlow. York Road had been a cricket ground from the late eighteenth century, and is acknowledged as the 'oldest senior football ground continuously used by the same club'. After the merger with Norfolkians in 1919, first team league and cup matches were played at Norfolkians' former home ground in Kidwells Park and in 1919–20 only one competitive first-team game was played at York Road. However, after the freehold of York Road was bought in 1920, the club returned to playing there. The ground's record attendance of 7,920 was set for an FA Amateur Cup quarter-final against Southall on 7 March 1936, with Maidenhead winning 1–0.

== Current squad ==
As of 10 November 2026

Note: Flags indicate national team as defined under FIFA eligibility rules; some limited exceptions apply. Players may hold more than one non-FIFA nationality.

No.	Pos.	Nation	Player
1	GK	ENG	Harvey Collins
2	DF	ENG	Owen Cochrane
3	DF	VIN	Jordan Ragguette
4	MF	ENG	Christian N'Guessan
5	DF	ENG	Miles Welch-Hayes
6	DF	WAL	George Abbott
7	MF	ENG	Josh Coley
8	MF	ENG	Joshua Johnson
9	FW	ENG	Daniel Nkrumah
10	FW	ENG	Alfie Pendlebury
11	MF	ENG	Jayden Mitchell-Lawson
12	MF	ENG	Matt Robinson
15	FW	ENG	Josh Umerah

No.	Pos.	Nation	Player
16	MF	ENG	Finley Welch
17	MF	STP	Mauro Vilhete
18	MF	ENG	Mathew Achuba
19	DF	ENG	David Mantle (on loan from Coventry City)
20	DF	FRA	Remy Clerima
21	DF	ENG	Joel-Michael Odeniran
22	GK	NED	Jordi van Stappershoef
23	FW	IRL	Nickson Okosun (on loan from Watford)
27	FW	ENG	Connor Hall
29	MF	ENG	Jadyn Dundas
30	DF	ENG	Manny Onariase
31	GK	ENG	Liam Vaughan
37	DF	ENG	Jordan Willis

=== Out on loan ===
Note: Flags indicate national team as defined under FIFA eligibility rules; some limited exceptions apply. Players may hold more than one non-FIFA nationality.

No.	Pos.	Nation	Player
14	DF	ENG	Josh McMenemy (at Bracknell Town until January 2027)
26	FW	ENG	Freddy Dunham (at Windsor & Eton until 12 December 2026)

== Staff ==
As of June 2026.

- Chairman: Peter Griffin
- Manager: Ryan Peters
- Assistant manager: Aaron O'Brien
- First team coach: Ryan Watts
- First team coach: Jazz Chahal
- First-team physio: Vacant
- Goalkeeping and set-piece coach: Liam Vaughan
- First-team scout: Lee Devonshire

== Honours ==
- National League
  - National League South champions 2016–17
- Isthmian League
  - Full Members Cup winners 1996–97
- Corinthian League
  - Champions 1957–58, 1960–61, 1961–62
  - Memorial Shield winners 1956–57, 1961–62
- Spartan League
  - Champions 1926–27, 1931–32, 1933–34
- Great Western Suburban League
  - Champions 1919–20
- West Berkshire League
  - Champions 1902–03
- Berks & Bucks Senior Cup
  - Winners 1894–95, 1895–96, 1911–12, 1927–28, 1929–30, 1930–31, 1931–32, 1938–39, 1945–46, 1955–56, 1956–57, 1960–61, 1962–63, 1965–66, 1969–70, 1997–98, 1998–99, 2001–02, 2002–03, 2009–10, 2014–15, 2016–17

== Records ==
- Best FA Cup performance: Quarter-finals, 1872–73, 1873–74, 1874–75
- Best FA Amateur Cup performance: Semi-finals, 1935–36
- Best FA Trophy performance: Quarter-finals, 2003–04
- Best FA Vase performance: Second round, 1989–90
- Record attendance: 7,920 vs Southall, FA Amateur Cup quarter-final, 7 March 1936
- Biggest win: 14–1 vs Buckingham Town, FA Amateur Cup, 6 September 1952
- Heaviest defeat: 14–0 vs Chesham United, Spartan League, 31 March 1923
- Most appearances: Bert Randall, 532 (1950–1964)
- Most goals: George Copas, 270 (1924–1935)
- Most goals in a season: Jack Palethorpe, 65 (1929–30)
- Most goals in a game: Jack Palethorpe, 7 vs Wood Green Town, 1929–30

== See also ==
- Maidenhead United F.C. players
- Maidenhead United F.C. managers
