= Berks & Bucks Football Association =

Area sporting organization with 19th century origins

- Headquarters: Abingdon
- President: Bill McKnight
- Website: berks-bucksfa.com

The Berks & Bucks Football Association is the County Football Association for Berkshire and Buckinghamshire. It is responsible for the development of association football in the two historic counties. It organises cup competitions between affiliated football clubs and the selects two representative teams. It was formed in 1878, with the first president and driving force being Mr J H Clark from Maidenhead.

The Berks & Bucks FA's administrative headquarters are in Abingdon, Berkshire's traditional county town. It is affiliated to England's national football association: the Football Association.

== Cup competitions ==
The Berks & Bucks FA organises a number of County Cup competitions for its members. The flagship event is its Senior Invitation Cup, which was first held in 1878. This is a full list of the 18 County Cups it organises:

Men's

- Senior Cup
- The Charles Twelftree Trophy
- Sunday Cup
- Sunday Trophy

Women's

- Women's Senior Cup
- Women's Trophy

Youth

- The Bill Gosling U18 Youth Cup
- U16 Youth Cup
- U15 Youth Cup
- U14 Youth Cup
- U13 Youth Cup
- U12 Youth Cup

Girls'

- U18 Girls' Cup
- U16 Girls' Cup
- U15 Girls' Cup
- U14 Girls' Cup
- U13 Girls' Cup
- U12 Girls' Cup

== Representative teams ==
The Berks & Bucks FA runs two representative teams:

- Youth under-18 team
- Minor under-16 team

== Affiliate leagues ==
Five leagues in the English football league pyramid are affiliated to the Berks & Bucks FA, all (except the TVPL Premier Division) of whose top levels sit just below the bottom of the Football Association's National League System, which covers the fifth to eleventh tiers of football in England. The leagues are self-governing and some members are registered with another county football association. The five leagues are:

- East Berkshire Football League (2 divisions)
- North Berks League (3 divisions)
- Aylesbury & District League (3 divisions)
- North Bucks & District Football League (3 divisions)
- Thames Valley Premier Football League (6 divisions)

Other affiliated men's 11-a-side leagues are, the Bracknell Town & District Sunday League, the Chesham Sunday League, the Chiltern Church League, the Grant & Stone High Wycombe Sunday Combination, the Milton Keynes Sunday League, the Newbury & District Sunday League, the Reading & District Sunday League, the Upper Thames Valley League.

In the women's game in England, the Thames Valley Women's Football League's three divisions, which belong in the sixth and seventh tiers of the league pyramid, are the only competitions in the pyramid which are affiliated to the Berks & Bucks FA.

A number of small-sided, women's football and youth football leagues are also affiliates.

== Affiliate clubs ==
The clubs in The Football League that are located in the Berks & Bucks area are:

- Milton Keynes Dons
- Reading
- Wycombe Wanderers
