= 1881–82 FA Cup =

FA Cup 1881–82
Tournament details
- Country: England
- Teams: 73

Final positions
- Champions: Old Etonians
- Runners-up: Blackburn Rovers

The 1881–82 Football Association Challenge Cup was the 11th staging of the FA Cup, England's oldest football tournament. Seventy-three teams entered, eleven more than last season, although five of the seventy-three never actually played a match.

== First round ==
Home club	Score	Away club	Date
Darwen	3–1	Blackburn Olympic	29 October 1881
Grantham	6–0	Brigg	5 November 1881
Reading	5–0	Hendon	29 October 1881
Sheffield	8–0	Brigg Britannia	5 November 1881
Barnes	3–1	Rochester	5 November 1881
Royal Engineers	6–0	Kildare	5 November 1881
Marlow	3–1	Brentwood	22 October 1881
Upton Park	3–0	St Alban's [Forest Gate]	22 October 1881
Windsor Home Park	0–1	Reading Minster	22 October 1881
Old Etonians	2–2	Clapham Rovers	5 November 1881
Herts Rangers	0–4	Swifts	5 November 1881
Notts County	Walkover	Calthorpe	
Old Foresters	3–0	Morton Rangers	5 November 1881
Wednesbury Strollers	3–1	Stafford Road	5 November 1881
Romford	Walkover	Rangers (London)	
Henley	0–2	Maidenhead	22 October 1881
West End	3–2	Remnants	29 October 1881
Blackburn Rovers	9–1	Blackburn Park Road	29 October 1881
Hanover United	Bye		
Hotspur	1–0	Highbury Union	5 November 1881
Mosquitos	1–1	Pilgrims	5 November 1881
Aston Villa	4–1	Nottingham Forest	5 November 1881
Acton	0–0	Finchley	29 October 1881
Sheffield Wednesday	2–0	Sheffield Providence	5 November 1881
Astley Bridge	2–2	Turton	29 October 1881
Dreadnought	Walkover	Caius College	
Staveley	5–1	Spilsby	29 October 1881
Esher Leopold	0–5	Old Carthusians	5 November 1881
Olympic	2–4	Old Harrovians	5 November 1881
Woodford Bridge	1–1	Reading Abbey	22 October 1881
Small Heath Alliance	4–1	Derby Town	17 October 1881
Sheffield Heeley	5–1	Lockwood Brothers	17 October 1881
Bootle	2–1	Blackburn Law	5 November 1881
St Bart's	Walkover	Wanderers	
Bolton Wanderers	5–5	Eagley	22 October 1881
Accrington	Walkover	Queen's Park	
Wednesbury Old Athletic	9–0	Mitchell St George's	5 November 1881

=== Replays ===
Home club	Score	Away club	Date
Clapham Rovers	0–1	Old Etonians	19 November 1881
Pilgrims	5–0	Mosquitos	12 November 1881
Acton	4–0	Finchley	12 November 1881
Turton	1–1	Astley Bridge	12 November 1881
Astley Bridge	3–3	Turton	19 November 1881
Turton	2–0	Astley Bridge	26 November 1881
Reading Abbey	2–1	Woodford Bridge	12 November 1881
Eagley	0–1	Bolton Wanderers	12 November 1881

== Second round ==
Home club	Score	Away club	Date
Darwen	3–1	Accrington	26 November 1881
Reading	1–1 West End disqualified	West End	26 November 1881
Sheffield	0–4	Sheffield Heeley	26 November 1881
Royal Engineers	Bye		
Marlow	2–0	St Bart's Hospital	30 November 1881
Maidenhead	2–1	Acton	3 December 1881
Old Etonians	Bye		
Swifts	7–1	Old Harrovians	19 November 1881
Notts County	5–3 Match void	Wednesbury Strollers	24 November 1881
Old Foresters	3–1	Pilgrims	3 December 1881
Blackburn Rovers	6–2	Bolton Wanderers	19 November 1881
Hanover United	1–3	Upton Park	26 November 1881
Aston Villa	Bye		
Turton	4–0	Bootle	3 December 1881
Old Carthusians	7–1	Barnes	3 December 1881
Sheffield Wednesday	Bye		
Reading Minster	3–1	Romford	3 December 1881
Reading Abbey	1–4	Hotspur	26 November 1881
Dreadnought	Bye		
Staveley	3–1	Grantham	28 November 1881
Wednesbury Old Athletic	6–0	Small Heath Alliance	3 December 1881

=== Replay ===
Home club	Score	Away club	Date
Notts County	11–1	Wednesbury Strollers	10 December 1881

== Third round ==
Home club	Score	Away club	Date
Darwen	4–1	Turton	17 December 1881
Reading	Bye		
Upton Park	Bye		
Old Etonians	3–0	Swifts	17 December 1881
Old Foresters	Bye		
Blackburn Rovers	Bye		
Hotspur	0–0	Reading Minster	17 December 1881
Aston Villa	2–2	Notts County	31 December 1881
Old Carthusians	0–2	Royal Engineers	22 December 1881
Sheffield Wednesday	2–2	Staveley	29 December 1881
Dreadnought	1–2	Marlow	17 December 1881
Maidenhead	Bye		
Sheffield Heeley	Bye		
Wednesbury Old Ath	Bye		

=== Replays ===
Home club	Score	Away club	Date
Hotspur	2–0	Reading Minster	26 December 1881
Notts County	2–2	Aston Villa	7 January 1882
Staveley	0–0	Sheffield Wednesday	7 January 1882
Sheffield Wednesday	5–1	Staveley	9 January 1882
Aston Villa	4–1	Notts County	14 January 1882

== Fourth round ==
Home club	Score	Away club	Date
Marlow	Walkover	Reading	
Upton Park	5–0	Hotspur	21 January 1882
Old Etonians	6–3	Maidenhead	14 January 1882
Old Foresters	2–1	Royal Engineers	21 January 1882
Blackburn Rovers	5–1	Darwen	30 January 1882
Sheffield Wednesday	3–1	Sheffield Heeley	21 January 1882
Wednesbury Old Athletic	4–2	Aston Villa	21 January 1882

== Fifth round ==
Home club	Score	Away club	Date
Old Etonians	Bye		
Old Foresters	0–0	Marlow	14 February 1882
Blackburn Rovers	3–1	Wednesbury Old Athletic	11 February 1882
Sheffield Wednesday	6–0	Upton Park	7 February 1882

=== Replay ===
Home club	Score	Away club	Date
Marlow	1–0	Old Foresters	18 February 1882

== Semi-finals ==
Home club	Score	Away club	Date
Old Etonians	5–0	Marlow	4 March 1882
Blackburn Rovers	0–0	Sheffield Wednesday	6 March 1882

=== Replay ===
Home club	Score	Away club	Date
Sheffield Wednesday	1–5	Blackburn Rovers	15 March 1882

== Final ==
	Score		Date
Old Etonians	1–0	Blackburn Rovers	25 March 1882
