= Minerva F.C. =

Minerva
- Full name: Fulham Football Club of all Men
- Nickname(s): The White Men
- Founded: 1876
- Dissolved: 1910?
- Ground: Ladywell Inn
- Capacity: 175
- Chairman: George Oak
- Manager: Unknown
Home colours

Minerva F.C. was an English association football club, originally playing out of Loughborough Junction in Lambeth, London.

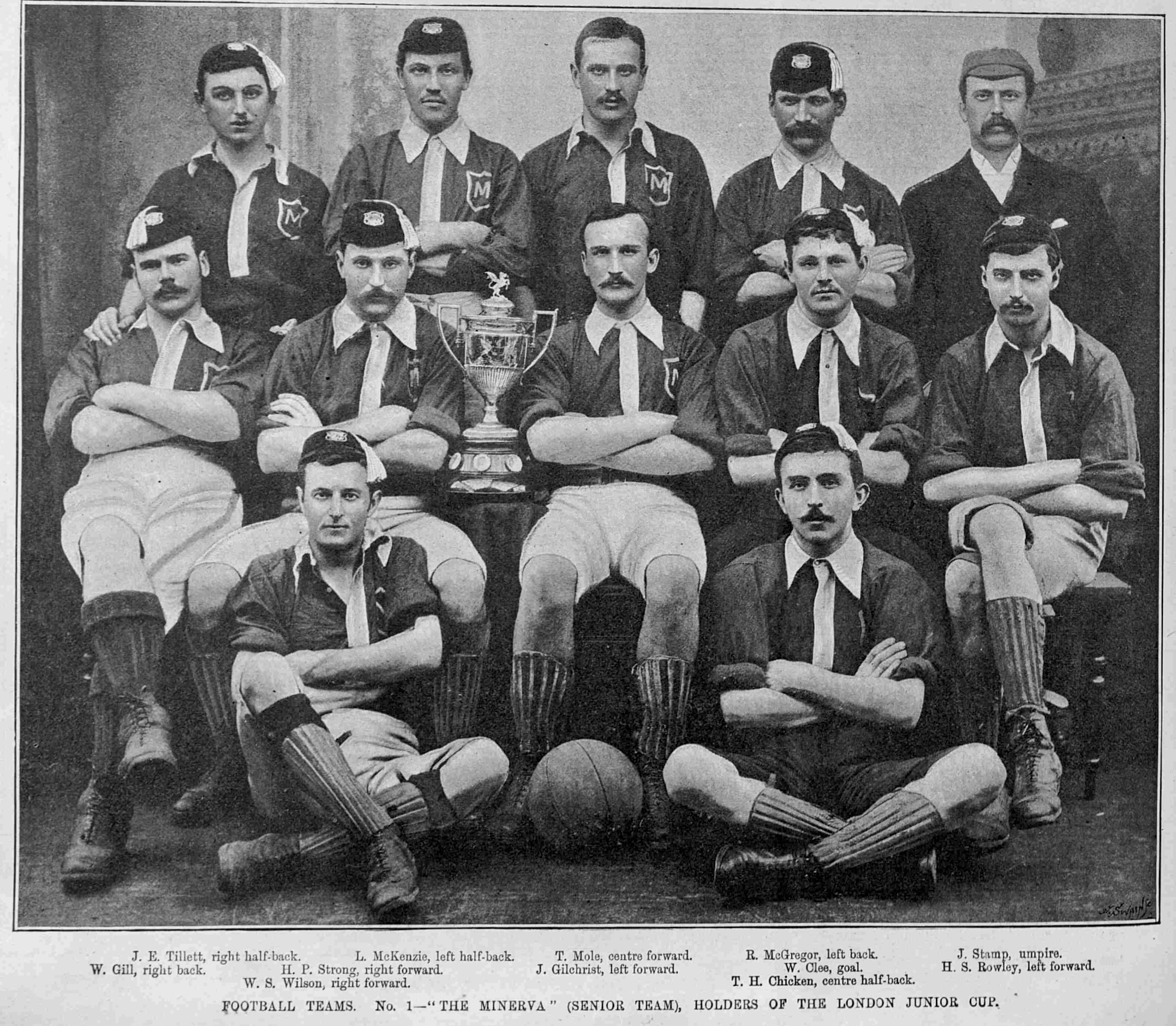
Minerva F.C., Illustrated Sporting and Dramatic News, 10 October 1891.

== History ==
The club was founded in 1876, including two players from Saxons and played its first game that October. The club was, in essence, the works side of the firm of Copestake Hughes Crampton & Co, a warehousing and mail order company, with the club's correspondence address given as the firm's offices at 5 Bow Church Yard. The club took its name from the company's logo, namely the head of the goddess Minerva.

In its first season, the club was unbeaten, winning 11 out of 15 matches and only conceding one goal. The club decided to take on sterner opposition in 1877–78 and entered the FA Cup. In the first round, Minerva lost 5–2 at the Hawks club at Anerley. Over the season, the club won 12 and lost 7 matches, with 2 drawn.

The club's only FA Cup run was in 1878–79, benefitting from a withdrawal in the first round, and beating Grey Friars in the second, in front of 300 spectators, in what was considered an upset. In the third round, Minerva played the Old Etonians at the Kennington Oval, and was 2–0 up at half-time "amidst most enthusiastic cheers" before succumbing 5–2.

The club's last FA Cup entry was in 1879–80, Herts Rangers beating the club in the first round. The club entered the first London Senior Cup in 1882–83, but lost 18–1, the biggest defeat in the competition's history, to Upton Park in the first round.

The club continued on an amateur level until at least 1908, with significant success in the City of London Challenge Shield, a competition which reserved for clubs whose members worked in the City of London, winning the competition from 1892 to 1897, and again in 1905–06 and 1906–07. The club beat Gresham 4–0 in the final at the Crystal Palace ground in 1896, beat Olympic to win the title in 1897, and lost to the latter club in the final in 1898. The club also won the London Junior Cup in 1890.

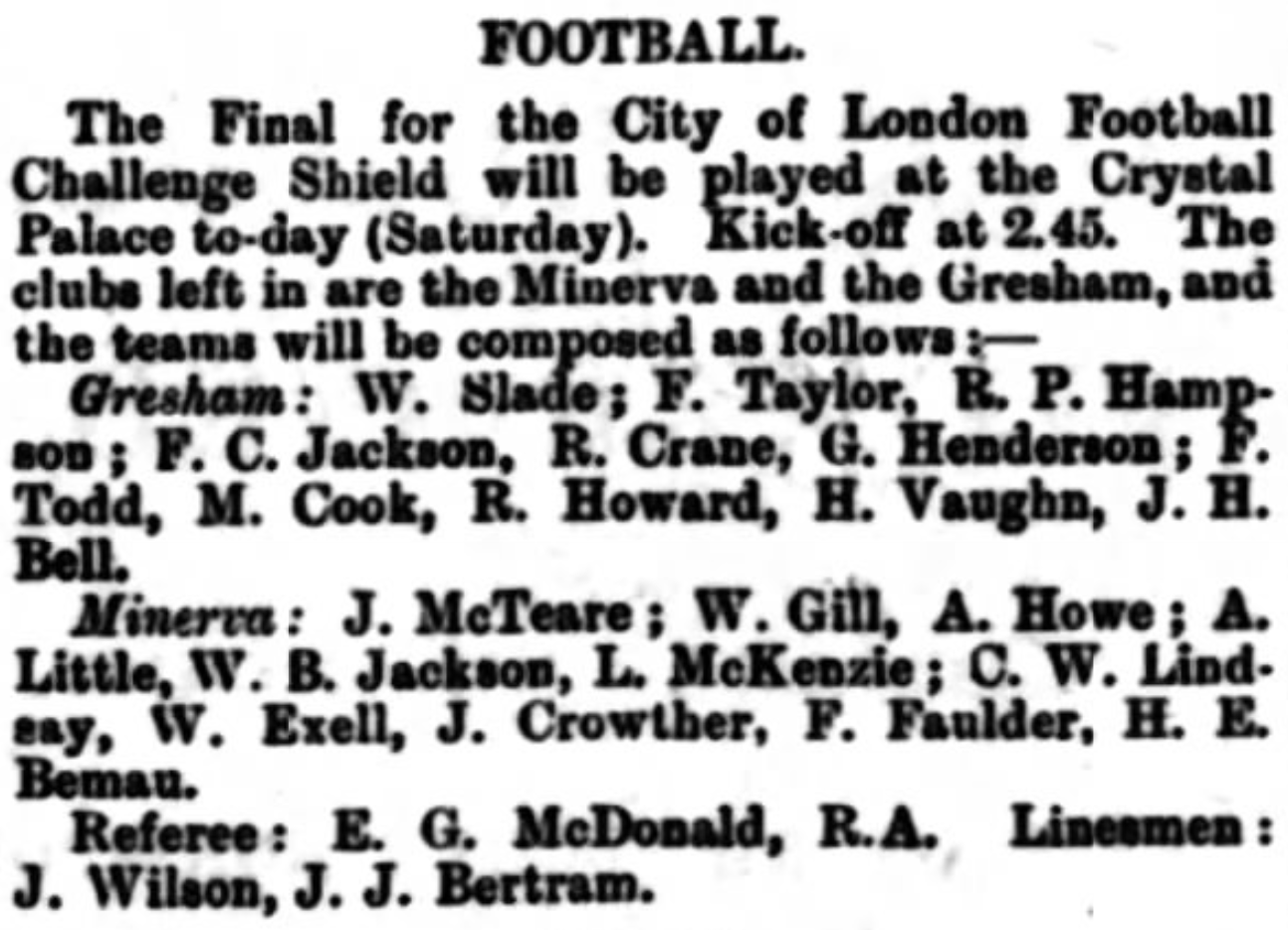
Line-ups for the 1896 City of London Challenge Shield final

The club's major claim to fame is being the first opponents of Fulham at Craven Cottage in the Middlesex Senior Cup, in 1896.

The last recorded match for the club above works league level is a 13–1 defeat at Chesham Generals in February 1901. The club continued as a member of the City of London Athletic Association until at least 1908.

== Colours ==
The club colours were originally navy blue shirts with white trim, originally a white band around each arm. By 1908 they were dark and light blue.

== Grounds ==
The club played its first season at Loughborough Junction. In 1877–78 the club moved to a ground one minute's walk from Ladywell Station and used the Ladywell Inn for its facilities. Its last known ground was at Eltham Road in Lee, south-east London.
