= 1880–81 FA Cup =

Tournament details
- Country: England
- Teams: 62

Final positions
- Champions: Old Carthusians (1st title)
- Runners-up: Old Etonians

The 1880–81 Football Association Challenge Cup was the tenth staging of the FA Cup, England's oldest football tournament. Sixty-two teams entered, eight more than the previous season, although four of the sixty-two never played a match.

== First round ==
Home club	Score	Away club	Date
Darwen	8–0	Brigg	13 November 1880
Reading	5–1	Hotspur	13 November 1880
Sheffield	5–4	Blackburn Olympic	30 October 1880
Royal Engineers	0–0	Remnants	13 November 1880
Marlow	6–0	Clarence	30 October 1880
Maidenhead	1–1	Old Harrovians	13 November 1880
Clapham Rovers	15–0	Finchley	13 November 1880
Upton Park	8–1	Mosquitos	13 November 1880
Pilgrims	Walkover	Old Philberdians	
Swifts	1–1	Old Foresters	6 November 1880
Herts Rangers	6–0	Barnes	6 November 1880
Rochester	1–2	Dreadnought	13 November 1880
Notts County	4–4	Derbyshire	4 November 1880
Nottingham Forest	Walkover	Caius College	
Romford	1–1	Reading Minster	13 November 1880
Grey Friars	0–0	Windsor Home Park	13 November 1880
Brentwood	0–10	Old Etonians	6 November 1880
West End	1–0	Hanover United	6 November 1880
Blackburn Rovers	6–2	Providence	30 October 1880
St Peter's Institute	1–8	Hendon	6 November 1880
Aston Villa	5–3	Wednesbury Strollers	30 October 1880
Stafford Road	7–0	Spilsby	6 November 1880
Turton	5–0	Brigg Britannia	16 October 1880
Old Carthusians	7–0	Saffron Walden Town	23 October 1880
Acton	1–1	Kildare	13 November 1880
Calthorpe	1–2	Grantham	11 November 1880
Sheffield Wednesday	Walkover	Queen's Park	
Astley Bridge	4–0	Eagley	30 October 1880
Weybridge Swallows	3–1	Henley	13 November 1880
Reading Abbey	1–0	St. Albans	13 November 1880
Rangers (London)	Walkover	Wanderers	

=== Replays ===
Home club	Score	Away club	Date
Remnants	0–1	Royal Engineers	20 November 1880
Old Harrovians	0–1	Maidenhead	20 November 1880
Old Foresters	1–2	Swifts	20 November 1880
Derbyshire	2–4	Notts County	27 November 1880
Romford	Walkover	Reading Minster	
Windsor Home Park	1–3	Grey Friars	20 November 1880
Kildare	0–5	Acton	20 November 1880

== Second round ==
Home club	Score	Away club	Date
Grantham	1–1	Stafford Road	11 December 1880
Reading	0–1	Swifts	18 December 1880
Sheffield	1–5	Darwen	18 December 1880
Royal Engineers	1–0	Pilgrims	9 December 1880
Marlow	4–0	West End	11 December 1880
Clapham Rovers	Bye		
Old Etonians	2–0	Hendon	4 December 1880
Herts Rangers	Bye		
Notts County	Bye		
Nottingham Forest	1–2	Aston Villa	4 December 1880
Romford	Bye		
Grey Friars	1–0	Maidenhead	11 December 1880
Blackburn Rovers	0–4	Sheffield Wednesday	18 December 1880
Old Carthusians	5–1	Dreadnought	11 December 1880
Astley Bridge	0–3	Turton	18 December 1880
Weybridge Swallows	0–3	Upton Park	18 December 1880
Reading Abbey	2–1	Acton	11 December 1880
Rangers (London)	Bye		

=== Replay ===
Home club	Score	Away club	Date
Stafford Road	7–1	Grantham	16 December 1880

== Third round ==
Home club	Score	Away club	Date
Darwen	Bye		
Royal Engineers	6–0	Rangers (London)	9 February 1881
Marlow	Bye		
Clapham Rovers	2–1	Swifts	8 January 1881
Upton Park	Bye		
Herts Rangers	0–3	Old Etonians	5 February 1881
Notts County	1–3	Aston Villa	12 February 1881
Romford	2–0	Reading Abbey	12 February 1881
Grey Friars	Bye		
Stafford Road	Bye		
Turton	0–2	Sheffield Wednesday	8 January 1881

== Fourth round ==
Home club	Score	Away club	Date
Darwen	5–2	Sheffield Wednesday	5 February 1881
Clapham Rovers	5–4	Upton Park	12 February 1881
Aston Villa	2–3	Stafford Road	19 February 1881
Old Etonians	4–0	Grey Friars	19 February 1881
Romford	2–1	Marlow	19 February 1881
Royal Engineers	0–2	Old Carthusians	19 February 1881

== Fifth round ==
Home club	Score	Away club	Date
Darwen	15–0	Romford	5 March 1881
Stafford Road	1–2	Old Etonians	19 March 1881
Old Carthusians	3–1	Clapham Rovers	19 March 1881

== Semi-finals ==
Home club	Score	Away club	Date
Old Etonians	Bye		
Old Carthusians	4–1	Darwen	26 March 1881

== Final ==
	Score		Date
Old Carthusians	3–0	Old Etonians	9 April 1881
