= Reading Abbey F.C. =

Defunct football club in England

Reading Abbey
- Full name: Reading Abbey F.C.
- Founded: 1875
- Dissolved: 1884
- Ground: King's Meadows
- Secretary: 1880–81: F. Plummer; 1881–82: Charles Pontin; 1884–86: F. L. Ponton
Home colours

Reading Abbey was an English association football club based in Reading, which entered the FA Cup in 1880–81 and 1881–82.

== History ==
The club was founded in 1875 under the name Reading St Lawrence, based at the Abbey Institute, an organization for young men affiliated with St Lawrence's Church; its earliest recorded matches are from the 1877–78 season.

The changed its name to Reading Abbey in 1880, in time for its first entry to the Cup. This was an ambitious step for the club, which had not yet played the leading club in the town (Reading F.C.), but by now the club included some players from the now-defunct Reading Hornets side, such as Abbey captain Charles Pontin. In the first round, the club beat the St Alban's club from Forest Gate, thanks to an own goal from a corner in the last five minutes. In the second round, held at the Reading Cricket Ground, Abbey beat Acton, coming from a goal behind to win 2–1, thanks to injuries and illness reducing Acton to 9 men for much of the second half. The third round tie at Romford was postponed after Abbey refused to travel after a hard frost - the home side eventually beat Abbey 2–0.

The club also played Reading for the only time, in the Berks & Bucks Senior Cup second round, losing 2–0.

The club reached the second round of the FA Cup in 1881–82, beating Woodford Bridge in a replay in the first, thanks to a very late goal by full-back Maxwell (who was "playing well up"), but its defeat (again at the Reading Cricket Ground) to the Hotspur club of Battersea was its last appearance in the competition.

The biggest problem the club had was that it had no permanent enclosed ground; it had to beg use of the Cricket Ground for big Cup ties. This seems to have caused the club to forgo membership of the Football Association after 1882, and, therefore, not be able to enter the FA Cup. The club had some strength within the town, being runners-up in the Reading Challenge Cup to South Reading in 1883, but the Abbey Institute closed during the 1883–84 season, and the club played very few matches during it. The club's 2–0 win over Culham College on 10 February 1884 appears to have been the club's last match, with players spreading to various other clubs in the region thereafter.

== Colours ==
The club's colours were blue shirts with red sleeves.

== Ground ==
The club played at the Recreation Park in the King's Meadows in Reading.
