= 1879–80 FA Cup =

1879–80 FA Cup (9th edition)
Tournament details
- Country: England
- Dates: 25 October 1879; 10 April 1880
- Teams: 54

Final positions
- Champions: Clapham Rovers F.C. (1st title)
- Runners-up: Oxford University A.F.C.
- Semifinalists: Nottingham Forest F.C.

Tournament statistics
- Matches played: 54
- Goals scored: 200 (3.7 per match)
- Top goal scorer(s): Sam Widdowson (Nottingham Forest F.C.) (7 goals)

The 1879–80 Football Association Challenge Cup was the ninth staging of the FA Cup, England's oldest football tournament. Fifty-four teams entered, eleven more than the previous season, although five of the fifty-four never played a match.

The Final was contested by Clapham Rovers and Oxford University at the Kennington Oval. Clapham Rovers won 1–0, the only goal being scored by Clopton Lloyd-Jones.

== Calendar ==
Round	Date	Fixtures					Clubs	New entries this round
Round	Date	Original	Plays	Replays	Walkovers	Byes	Clubs	New entries this round
First round	25 October - 25 November 1879	26	21	5	5	2	52 → 28	52
Second round	6 December 1879 - 24 January 1880	13	12	2	1	2	28 → 15	2
Third round	17 January - 4 February 1880	5	4	0	1	5	15 → 10	none
Fourth round	7 - 19 February 1880	5	5	0	0	0	10 → 5	none
Fifth round	21 February - 15 March 1880	2	2	1	0	1	5 → 3	none
Semi-finals	27 March 1880	1	1	0	0	1	3 → 2	none
Final	10 April 1880	1	1	0	0	0	2 → 1	none

== First round ==
25 October 1879	Maidenhead F.C.	3–1	Calthorpe F.C.	York Road, Maidenhead
	Bassett; Blackwell; Goldsmith		Rushell	Referee: Charles W. Alcock

1 November 1879	Blackburn Rovers F.C.	5–1	Tyne Association F.C.	Alexandra Meadows, Blackburn
	Jimmy Brown; Johnny Duckworth; John Lewis		Bruce	Referee: J. Martin

1 November 1879	Eagley F.C.	0–1	Darwen F.C.	Volunteer Inn Ground, Eagley
			Rostron

1 November 1879	Kildare F.C.	0–3	Gresham F.C.	Kensal Green, London
			Cullen; Jeffrey

1 November 1879	Mosquitoes F.C.	3–1	St Peter's Institute F.C.	Unidentified, Nunhead
	Davey; Borman		Daville

1 November 1879	Pilgrims F.C.	5–2	Clarence F.C.	Lordship Lane, Tottenham
	Ramsey; F. Last; Mott; Poland		T. Stone; Wilmshurst

1 November 1879	South Norwood F.C.	4–2	Brentwood F.C.	Cricket Ground, South Norwood
	Knight; Hamilton; Robertson		Groves; Sparham

1 November 1879	Turton F.C.	7–0	Brigg Town F.C.	Turton Football Ground, Tower Street, Chapeltown
	H. Haworth; P. Toothill; T. Bentley; Harner

6 November 1879	Great Marlow F.C.	1–1	Oxford University A.F.C.	Aldermeadow, Marlow
	Flint		Aston

8 November 1879	Acton F.C.	0–4	Old Carthusians F.C.	Acton Ground, near the Mill Hill Tavern, Gunnersbury Lane, Acton
			Unknown

8 November 1879	Clapham Rovers F.C.	7–0	Romford F.C.	Unidentified, Romford
	Unknown

8 November 1879	Finchley F.C.	1–2	Old Harrovians A.F.C.	Unidentified, Finchley
	Unknown		Unknown

8 November 1879	Grey Friars F.C.	2–1	Hanover United F.C.	Grey Friars' ground, near the Greyhound pub, Dulwich
	Unknown		Unknown

8 November 1879	Hendon F.C.	1–1	Old Foresters F.C.	Hendon Cricket Ground, Brampton Grove, Hendon
	Williams		Unknown

8 November 1879	Hotspur F.C.	1–1	Argonauts F.C.	The Cricketers, Battersea Park, Battersea
	Winter		Gore

8 November 1879	Nottingham Forest F.C.	4–0	Notts County F.C.	Trent Bridge, West Bridgford
15:00	Arthur Smith; Sam Widdowson			Attendance: 2000

8 November 1879	Stafford Road F.C.	2–0	Wednesbury Strollers F.C.	Recreation Ground, Stafford Road Railway Works, Wolverhampton
	Unknown

13 November 1879	Royal Engineers A.F.C.	2–0	Cambridge University A.F.C.	Chatham Lines, Chatham
	Unknown

15 November 1879	Hertfordshire Rangers F.C.	2–1	Minerva F.C.	Cassiobury Park, Watford
	Hill		Fabian

15 November 1879	Remnants F.C.	1–1	Upton Park F.C.	Aldin House, Slough
	Cuppage		Charlie Bambridge

15 November 1879	Rochester F.C.	0–6	Wanderers F.C.	Borstal Road, Rochester
			Unknown

Birmingham F.C.	w/o	Panthers F.C.

Henley Town F.C.	w/o	Reading F.C.

Old Etonians A.F.C.	w/o	Barnes F.C.

Sheffield F.C.	w/o	Queen's Park F.C.

West End F.C.	w/o	Swifts F.C.

Aston Villa F.C.	bye

Providence F.C.	bye

=== Replays ===
10 November 1879	Oxford University A.F.C.	1–0	Great Marlow F.C.	The Parks, Oxford
	Unknown

15 November 1879	Argonauts F.C.	0–1	Hotspur F.C.	Unidentified, Forest Gate
			Cherry

15 November 1879	Old Foresters F.C.	2–2	Hendon F.C.	The Park, Snaresbrook
	Day; J. Guy		Buck; Unknown

22 November 1879	Hendon F.C.	3–1	Old Foresters F.C.	Hendon Cricket Ground, Brampton Grove, Hendon
	Buck; H. O. Ince; Morice		Unknown

25 November 1879	Upton Park F.C.	5–2	Remnants F.C.	West Ham Park, West Ham
	Charlie Bambridge; Mitchell; Unknown		Cuppage; Edward Hawtrey

== Second round ==
6 December 1879	Blackburn Rovers F.C.	3–1	Darwen F.C.	Alexandra Meadows, Blackburn
	Jimmy Brown; J. Hargreaves		E. Suter

13 December 1879	Stafford Road F.C.	1–1	Aston Villa F.C.	Stafford's Half-Way House Ground, Wolverhampton
	Charles Crump		Andy Hunter	Attendance: 2000

13 December 1879	Turton F.C.	0–6	Nottingham Forest F.C.	Thomason Fold Ground, Edgworth
15:00			Arthur Smith; Sam Widdowson; Teddy Earp; John Turner	Attendance: 2500; Referee: E.H. Steedman

13 December 1879	West End F.C.	1–0	Hotspur F.C.	Wormholt Farm, Shepherd's Bush
	Elmslie

15 December 1879	Sheffield F.C.	3–3	Providence F.C.	Bramall Lane, Sheffield
	Matthews; H. Moss; Unknown		Brownhill; Unknown (o.g.)

20 December 1879	Clapham Rovers F.C.	4–1	South Norwood F.C.	Wandsworth Common, Wandsworth
	Arthur Stanley; Clopton Lloyd-Jones; Francis Sparks		Unknown

20 December 1879	Grey Friars F.C.	9–0	Gresham F.C.	Grey Friars' ground, near the Greyhound pub, Dulwich
	Green; Broadhurst; Kirkpatrick; Sharp; Stransham; Unknown (o.g.) (o.g.)

20 December 1879	Hendon F.C.	7–1	Mosquitoes F.C.	The Oval, Kennington, London
	H. O. Ince; Morice; J. Powell; R. Powell; Unknown (o.g.)		Ginger

23 December 1879	Royal Engineers A.F.C.	4–1	Upton Park F.C.	Chatham Lines, Chatham
	Learoyd; Paterson; Unknown		Garnett-Clarke

29 December 1879	Henley Town F.C.	1–3	Maidenhead F.C.	Marlow Road, Henley-on-Thames
	Unknown		W.E. Lovegrove; Harris

10 January 1880	Wanderers F.C.	1–0	Old Carthusians F.C.	The Oval, Kennington, London
	Henry Wace

19 January 1880	Birmingham F.C.	0–6	Oxford University A.F.C.	Aston Lower Grounds, Birmingham
			Guy; Reginald Heygate	Attendance: 400-500

Pilgrims F.C.	w/o	Hertfordshire Rangers F.C.

Old Etonians A.F.C.	bye

Old Harrovians A.F.C.	bye

=== Replays ===
29 December 1879	Sheffield F.C.	3–0	Providence F.C.	Bramall Lane, Sheffield
	Arthur Cursham; Matthews; Thomas Sorby

24 January 1880	Aston Villa F.C.	3–1	Stafford Road F.C.	Wellington Road, Perry Barr
	Billy Mason; Sammy Law		Charles Crump	Referee: L. H. Cofield

== Third round ==
17 January 1880	Clapham Rovers F.C.	7–0	Pilgrims F.C.	The Oval, Kennington, London
	Francis Sparks; Felix Barry; Clopton Lloyd-Jones; Arthur Stanley

24 January 1880	Old Etonians A.F.C.	3–1	Wanderers F.C.	Dutchman's Playing Fields, Eton
	Harry Goodhart; Sedgwick		Henry Wace

31 January 1880	Nottingham Forest F.C.	6–0	Blackburn Rovers F.C.	Trent Bridge, West Bridgford
15:00	Arthur Smith 3'; John Turner 13'; Sam Widdowson 25'; Arthur Goodyer			Attendance: 2500

4 February 1880	Royal Engineers A.F.C.	2–0	Old Harrovians A.F.C.	Chatham Lines, Chatham
	Unknown

Oxford University A.F.C.	w/o	Aston Villa F.C.

Grey Friars F.C.	bye

Hendon F.C.	bye

Maidenhead F.C.	bye

Sheffield F.C.	bye

West End F.C.	bye

== Fourth round ==
7 February 1880	Old Etonians A.F.C.	5–1	West End F.C.	Dutchman's Playing Fields, Eton
	Harry Goodhart; Arthur Kinnaird		Elmslie

14 February 1880	Clapham Rovers F.C.	2–0	Hendon F.C.	Wandsworth Common, Wandsworth
	Clopton Lloyd-Jones

14 February 1880	Maidenhead F.C.	0–1	Oxford University A.F.C.	York Road, Maidenhead
			Unknown

18 February 1880	Royal Engineers A.F.C.	1–0	Grey Friars F.C.	Chatham Lines, Chatham
	Tanner

19 February 1880	Nottingham Forest F.C.	2–2 (Note: Sheffield was disqualified for not playing extra-time, in defiance of the referee's instruction: Nottingham Evening Post, 26 February 1880, p.3.)	Sheffield F.C.	Trent Bridge, West Bridgford
15:30	Arthur Smith 50'; Sam Widdowson 70'		H. Barber; Unknown	Attendance: 2000; Referee: Charles W. Alcock

== Fifth round ==
21 February 1880	Clapham Rovers F.C.	1–0	Old Etonians A.F.C.	Wandsworth Common, Wandsworth
	Clopton Lloyd-Jones

5 March 1880	Oxford University A.F.C.	1–1	Royal Engineers A.F.C.	The Parks, Oxford
	John Lubbock		Massey

Nottingham Forest F.C.	bye

=== Replay ===
15 March 1880	Oxford University A.F.C.	1–0	Royal Engineers A.F.C.	The Oval, Kennington, London
	George Childs

== Semi-finals ==
27 March 1880	Oxford University A.F.C.	1–0	Nottingham Forest F.C.	The Oval, Kennington, London
	George Childs

Clapham Rovers F.C.	bye

== Final ==
10 April 1880	Clapham Rovers F.C.	1–0	Oxford University A.F.C.	The Oval, Kennington, London
	Clopton Lloyd-Jones 84'			Attendance: 6000; Referee: Major Francis Marindin

== See also ==
- FA Cup
- FA Cup Final
