= Hendon F.C. (1876) =

Hendon
- Full name: Hendon Football Club
- Founded: 1876
- Dissolved: 1939
- Ground: Brent Street
Home colours

Hendon Football Club was an English association football club from Hendon, today in the London Borough of Barnet, founded in 1876.

== History ==
The club appeared in the F.A. Cup between 1877 and 1887 and had one of its players selected for England in 1884.

=== FA Cup history ===
The club's greatest achievement was on 10 November 1883 when it defeated the previous season's FA Cup finalists Old Etonians by three goals to two.

1877–78

- First Round – Defeated 2–0 by Marlow

1878–79

- First Round – Defeated 1–0 by Reading

1879–80

- First Round – Drew 1–1 with Old Foresters
- First Round Replay – Drew 2–2
- First Round Second Replay – Won 3–1
- Second Round – Won 7–1 v. Mosquitoes
- Third Round – Bye
- Fourth Round – Defeated 2–0 by Clapham Rovers

1880–81

- First Round – Won 8–1 v. St Peter's Institute
- Second Round – Defeated 2–0 by Old Etonians

1881–82

- First Round – Defeated 5–0 by Reading

1882–83

- First Round – Won 3–1 v. West End
- Second Round – Won 2–1 v. Chatham
- Third Round – Won 11–1 v. South Reading
- Fourth Round – Won 3–0 v. Marlow
- Fifth Round – Defeated 4–2 by Old Etonians

1883–84

- First Round – Won 3–2 v. Old Etonians
- Second Round – Defeated 2–1 by Old Westminsters

1884–85

- First Round – Drew 3–3 with Clapham Rovers
- First Round Replay – Won 6–0
- Second Round – Defeated 1–0 by Chatham

1885–86

- First Round – Defeated 4–0 by Clapton

1886–87

- First Round – Defeated 2–1 by London Caledonians

1887–88

- First Round – Defeated 4–2 by Old Harrovians

=== Later history ===
The club continued in existence until the Second World War. It did not however survive the War, and Golders Green F.C., which was founded in 1908 as Christ Church Hampstead, adopted the Hendon F.C. name in 1946. The two clubs played each other twice in April 1932 to raise funds.

== Colours ==
The Charles Alcock annuals record the following colours for the club:

Colours
Year	Colours
1875–77	White jersey with HFC monogram, blue knickerbockers, scarlet stockings
1877–78	Scarlet & white jersey, blue knickers, scarlet stockings
1878–80	Red, white & blue (possibly same schema as 1877–78)
1880–82	Scarlet & white jersey, blue knickers, scarlet stockings
1882–84	White & blue
1884–85	Red & white

== Ground ==
The club played its home games at the Hendon cricket ground in Brampton Grove, off Brent Street, London NW4.

== Famous players ==
- Charles Plumpton Wilson made two appearances for England in 1883–84.
- A.L. Henry
