= Hawks F.C. =

- Full name: Hawks Football Club
- Founded: 1875
- Dissolved: 1879
- Ground: Robin Hood pub
- Secretary: C. J. Fox (1876), W. G. Hamilton (1877), Arthur G. Pitman (1878–9)
Home colours

Hawks F.C. was an English association football club from Anerley in London.

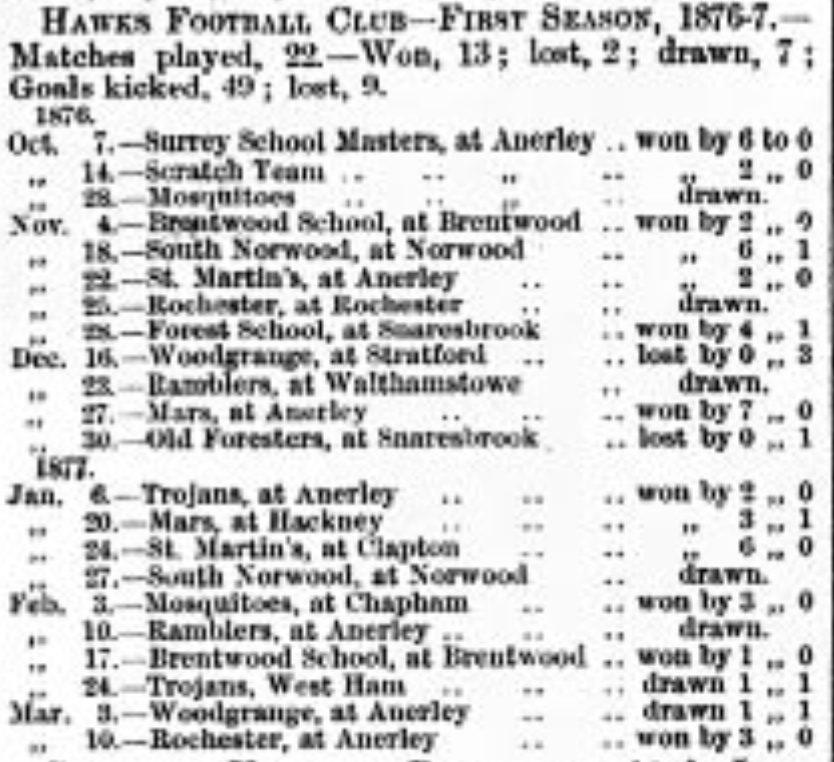
The club's results from its first season, published in the Norwood News of 28 April 1877.

== History ==
Although the club claimed a foundation date of 1875, its first reported game was against a Surrey School Masters select on 7 October 1876, ending in a 6–0 win. The first match against a regular club was against Mosquitoes F.C. on 28 October 1876. The match ended goalless, after a Hawks goal was disallowed as Mosquitoes noticed that the club had 12 men on the pitch.

As was common in the 1870s, many of the Hawks players also played for other clubs; the Hawks' victory over South Norwood in November 1876 being made easier by several of the South Norwood players choosing to play for the Hawks instead.

One remarkable game in January 1878 saw the club beat the Blue Mantles 6–0, with a further six goals being disallowed for offside.

Hawks competed in the FA Cup twice. In 1877–78, the club beat Minerva 5–2 in the first round, before losing to Remnants in the second, the Remnants club being reckoned to be two stones per man heavier on average than the Hawks. This weight difference proved decisive, as the Hawks' Jones went off injured in the first half, and both Remnants goals came from scrimmages. Notably, multiple reports praise the goalkeeping of the Remnants' Rev. William Blackmore. There was some consolation for one of the players, J. R. Fox, a former Westminster School pupil, as he played for the London Association in a representative match against the Birmingham Association in January 1878. Fox was known as a decent back, but considered "rather slow".

In 1878–79, the club lost to the Swifts in the first round, having taken the lead, but conceding an equalizer which saw a shot from Charles Bambridge "touching the tape, but going through", before a goal which the Hawks disputed as being offside.

In the latter season, the club played in far fewer matches than in the preceding year (11 as opposed to 24), and the club membership had dwindled from 52 to 35. The club seems to have been disbanded after this season, as for 1879–80 its players are recorded as playing for clubs such as Clapham Rovers and Grey Friars.

The name was revived in 1884 for another club in Anerley, with an entirely different set of players, and wearing red and black, but still playing at the Robin Hood fields. The last recorded match was a win over Champion Hill in December 1885.

== Colours ==
The club's colours were dark and light blue, probably in hoops, as that was the main pattern at the time, and the club did not describe any other pattern.

== Ground ==
The club played a ground three minutes' walk from Anerley railway station, using the Robin Hood public house for its facilities.
