= Wood Grange F.C. =

Wood Grange
- Full name: Wood Grange Football Club
- Founded: 1872
- Dissolved: 1878
- Ground: West Ham Park
Home colours

Wood Grange F.C., sometimes styled Woodgrange, was an English association football club, based in Stratford, in north-east London.

== History ==
The earliest available reported match for the club was at the end of 1872, a defeat at the Leyton side Alpha.

The club competed in the FA Cup in 1876 and 1877, both times losing in the first round. In 1876-77, the club was drawn to play Panthers, and the match arranged for Upton Park; however the Dorsetshire side found it difficult to locate the ground, and, "after they had been wandering for hours in the park", the match kicked off at 4pm. With the game ending in the dark, the Panthers scored three times without reply, all in the final 15 minutes.

The following year, at the neutral venue of the West Ham Park, the club was beaten 4–0 by High Wycombe, all of the goals coming in the second half.

The club was never a large club; in the 1876–77 season it only had 30 members, and had to rely on two substitutes in a match with Auckland Rangers at the start of the 1877–78 season to make up a side of ten; nevertheless Wood Grange still won 2–1. By February 1878, the club was only able to field six players (plus two substitutes) for a defeat at Acton.

In 1878–79, the club started the season with a 3–2 victory over Langley United at home, but although a return fixture had been arranged for the following January, there is no evidence it was ever played.

== Colours ==
The club's colours were navy blue jerseys, with red and black stockings and cap.

== Ground ==
The club played its earliest home matches on a field owned by G. Jones on the Romford Road. By 1876, the club was playing at West Ham Park, half-a-mile from Stratford station, and used the Pigeons public house (also on the Romford Road) for its facilities.
