= Argonauts F.C. =

The Argonauts (first version)
- Full name: Argonauts Football Club
- Founded: 1875
- Dissolved: 1880
- Ground: South Hackney Common

The Argonauts (second version)
- Full name: Argonauts Football Club
- Founded: 1928
- Dissolved: 1930
- Ground: Wembley Stadium
- Capacity: 127,000
- Founder: Dick Sloley

The Argonauts name was used by two separate London football clubs.

== Original club ==
The original Argonauts club played home games on South Hackney Common in the 1870s. Its first reported matches date back to 1875 and the club entered the FA Cup in 1879–80, losing to Hotspur in a replay; by this time the club had moved to Forest Gate. For the 1880–81 season its captain (J. Wylie) and some of its players had moved to Dreadnought F.C. and the club seems to have been wound up.

== 1928 incarnation ==
The second version was a unique amateur football club based in London. Despite never playing a match or having a published squad, they became notable in the late 1920s for attempting to join the Football League three times.

The team was formed in 1928 by Dick Sloley, Cambridge University and England amateur international, and president of the Ealing Association Football Club, as an equivalent to the Scottish Queen's Park club to play in the Football League. Stoley claimed to have secured the services of the top amateur players of the day for his new national amateur club and the 100,000 capacity White City Stadium to play in. After objections from local Third Division South clubs Queens Park Rangers and Brentford, he then proceeded to hire Wembley Stadium as a venue.

The club applied for Football League status that year, falling in third place but earning a creditable 16 votes. The club went inactive for a year, but reapplied in 1929, this time with Lord Lonsdale as club chairman, coming again in third – one place off acceptance but this time with only 6 votes. Yet again, the club became inactive for a year. A third and final attempt was made in 1930; this time no votes were gained whilst even Llanelly gained 4 votes.
