= West End F.C. (disambiguation) =

West End F.C. or West End Football Club may refer to:

- Forfar West End F.C., a Scottish junior association football club from Forfar, Angus
- Newcastle West End F.C., a defunct English association football club that merged with Newcastle East End to form Newcastle United
- West End F.C., a Welsh association football club from the Mayhill area of Swansea
- West End F.C. (Dundee), a defunct Scottish association football club from Dundee
- West End F.C. (Glasgow), a defunct Scottish association football club from the Cowlairs area of Glasgow
- West End F.C. (London), a defunct English association football club from Shepherd's Bush
