= St Albans F.C. (Forest Gate) =

St Albans
- Full name: St Albans Football Club
- Founded: 1877
- Dissolved: 1882
- Ground: Princess Alice, Forest Gate
- Secretary: 1877–78: F. G. Snell; 1880–82: H. Shadwell
Home colours

St Albans F.C., sometimes reported as St Alban's, was an English association football club based in London, named after a local church.

== History ==
The club's first reported match was against Grey Friars in October 1877 and the club lost all nine of the matches it played in its first season. In 1879–80 however the club won 9 of its 16 matches and in 1880–81 it won 7 out of 18.

The club entered the FA Cup twice, in 1880–81 and 1881–82, losing both times in the first round. The club's last match of note was an exit in the London Senior Cup second round in 1882–83, going down 1–0 to Mosquitoes at the Greyhound ground in Dulwich, although the score did not represent the 'Quitoes' dominance.

== Colours ==
The club wore navy and white.

== Ground ==
The club played at Forest Gate and used the Princess Alice public house for its facilities.
