= Marshall & Snelgrove =

Former department store in London

Coordinates: 51°30′52.84″N 0°8′48.97″W

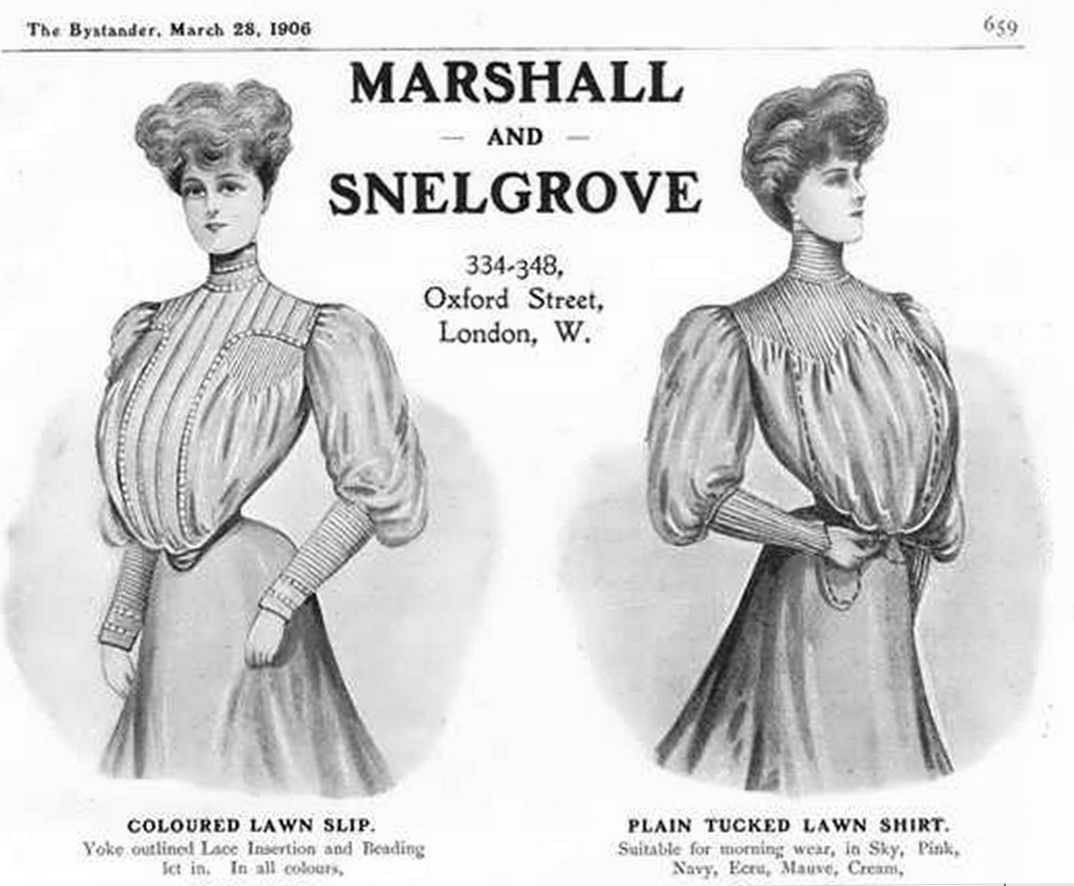
Illustration from 1905 Oxford Street store catalogue

Marshall & Snelgrove was a department store on the north side of Oxford Street, London, on the corner with Vere Street founded by James Marshall (b.1806 Yorkshire – d.22 November 1893). The company became part of the Debenhams group.

== History ==
In 1837 James Marshall, a Yorkshireman, opened a shop at 11 Vere Street in partnership with a Mr Wilson. Marshall had previously worked as a shop assistant for Burrell, Son and Toby at 10 Vere Street. The partnership expanded to become Marshall, Wilson and Stinton. In 1848 when Stinton retired, John Snelgrove, an assistant in the business, became a partner and the firm's name was changed to Marshall and Snelgrove. In 1847 James C Marshall, eldest son of James Marshall, joined the firm. The business expanded and new premises were taken on the corner of Vere Street and Oxford Street. The new building opened in 1851 and was originally called the Royal British Warehouse.

In 1855 James C Marshall married Louisa Stinton, daughter of the partner who had retired.

In 1871 James Marshall, the founder, retired with the firm then being run by James C Marshall and John Snelgrove. Snelgrove died in 1903.

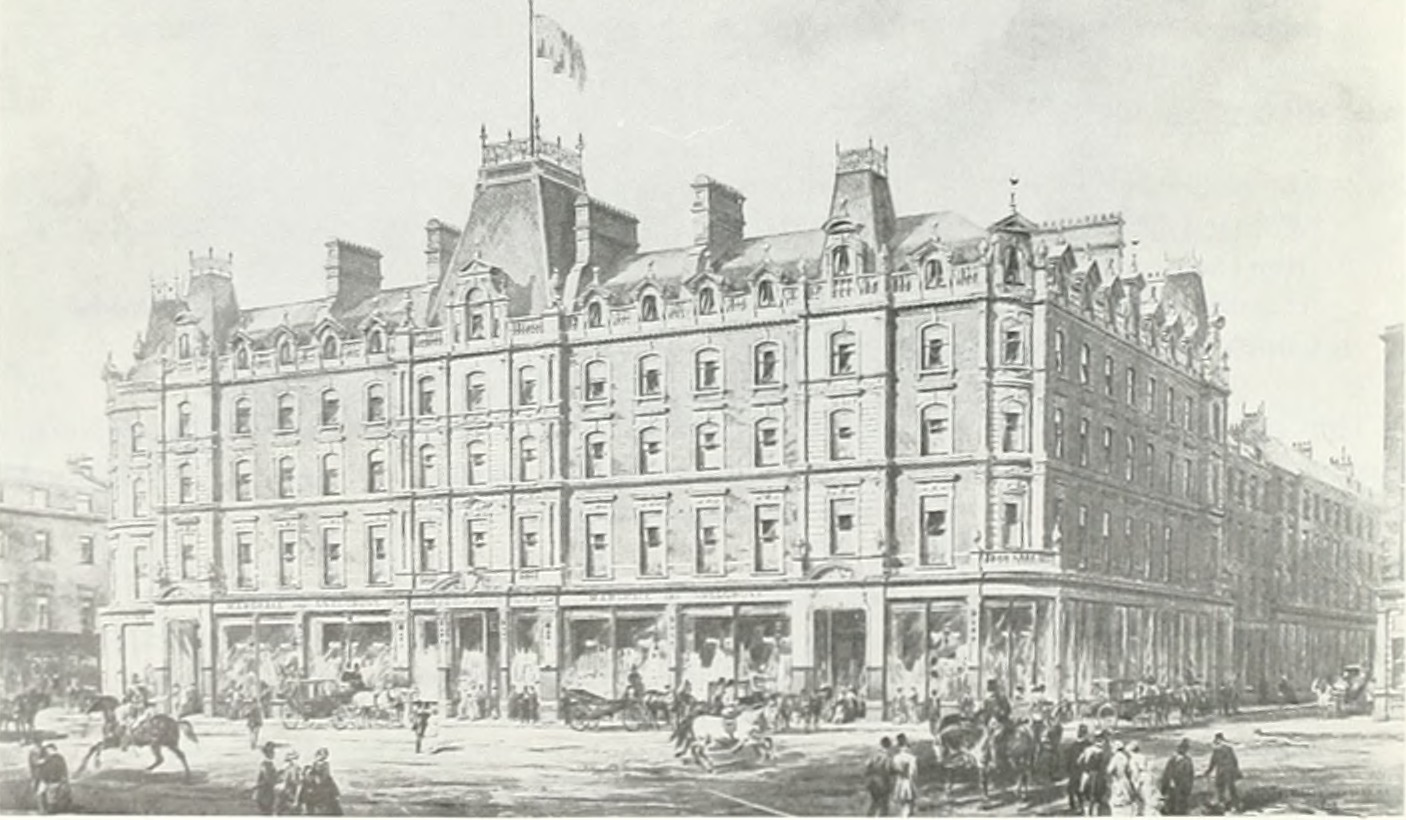
Marshall & Snelgrove's department store building of 1870 on Oxford Street.

The Oxford Street premises were rebuilt in the 1870s to designs by Horace Jones and his colleague Octavius Hansard. By this time, the business had expanded to occupy most of the block of buildings between Vere Street and Marylebone Lane.

Branches were opened in the then fashionable resorts of Scarborough, Harrogate and elsewhere.

The First World War had great impact on department stores especially the luxury market. By 1916 a working relationship was established with Debenhams in order to preserve the businesses in the war economy. There was a full merger in May 1919 when Marshall and Snelgrove had financial difficulties.

James C Marshall was President of the Linen and Woollen Drapers' Institution for almost 40 years till his death in 1925 at the age of 95.

Members of the Marshall family remained at the helm of the business. Further branches were established as a number of stores were added to the Marshall & Snelgrove nameplate as the wider Debenham group expanded. These included stores in New Street Birmingham (formerly Warwick House), Bradford, Leeds, Leicester (formerly Adderlys), Manchester (formerly Frank Drury, acquired 1938; closed 1969), Sheffield, Southport (formerly the furthest north of the Bobbys stores) and York.

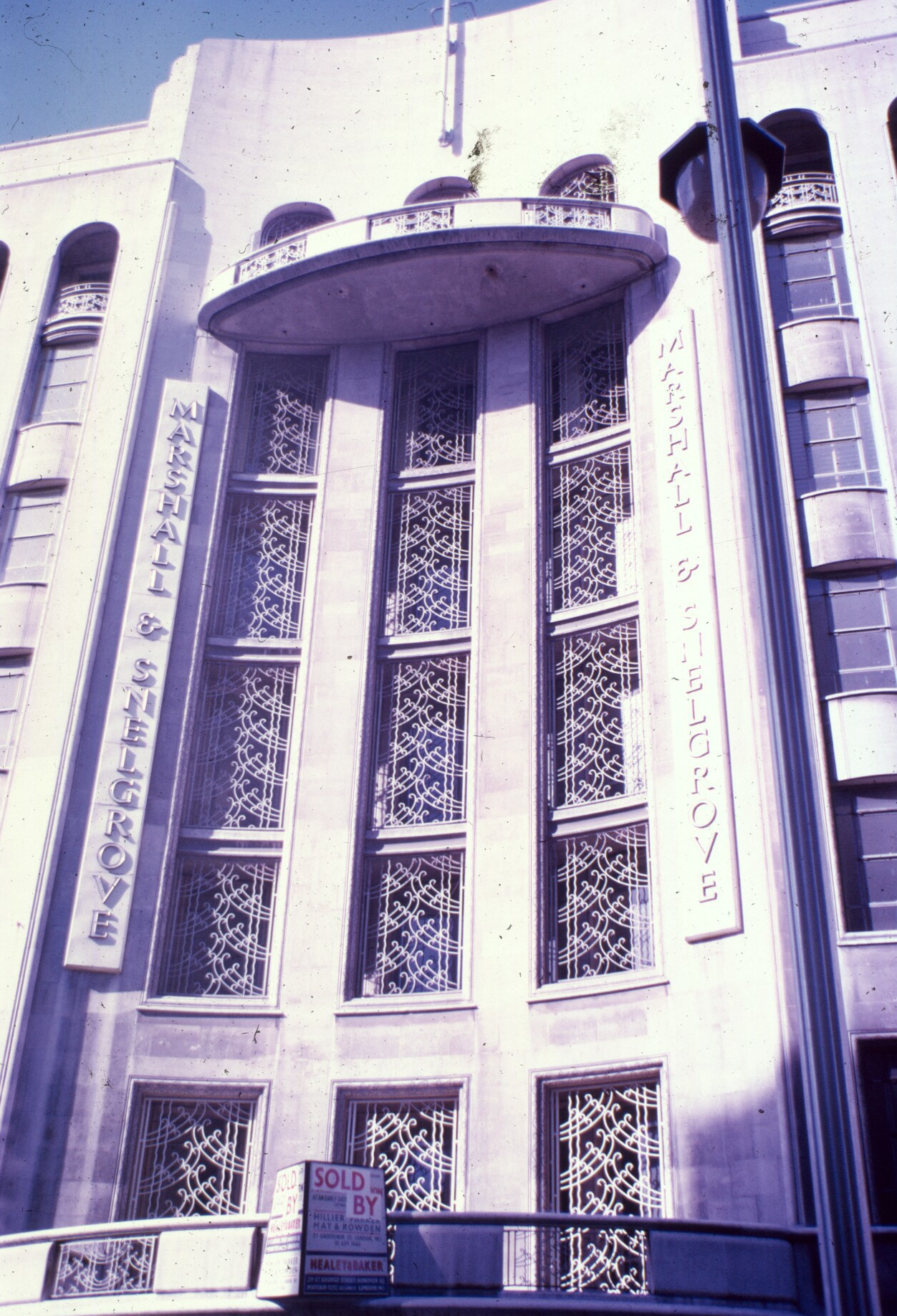
Birmingham store, 1970

The Oxford Street store was demolished and rebuilt between 1969–71 and continued to trade as Marshall & Snelgrove until 1972. The store was then renamed Debenhams, becoming the group's flagship store, following the closure of the nearby Debenham & Freebody. The regional branches of Marshall & Snelgrove were all either rebranded as Debenhams or closed by the end of the decade.

== Sport ==
The store had a strong athletic ethos, with clubs for cricket, football, athletics, rowing, and water-polo, amongst others. These were mostly brought under the umbrella of a single club (the Magpie Athletic Club) in 1895, with a purpose-built ground in Wembley Park being erected in 1905. The football side, West End F.C., was one of the last ten clubs left in the 1879–80 FA Cup.
