= Park Grange F.C. =

Park Grange
- Full name: Park Grange Football Club
- Nickname(s): the Grange/Grangeites
- Founded: 1874
- Dissolved: 1890
- Ground: Sheaf House Ground
Home colours

Park Grange F.C. was an English association football club based in Sheffield, South Yorkshire.

== History ==
The club was formed as Providence (sometimes referred to as Sheffield Providence) in 1874, originally playing under Sheffield rules. It competed in the FA Cup on three occasions under the Providence name before changing to Park Grange in the summer of 1882 following a merger.

=== Providence years ===
The club's most competitive run in the Cup was its first, in 1879-80, when it received a bye in the first round and was drawn with Sheffield F.C. in the second. No other Sheffield clubs had entered the competition. Providence had "not generally been considered a formidable club", but had a "pushing executive" and, with a near-monopoly on choosing a squad for the competition, "got several of the crack players of the district to qualify for the tie under notice"; the Sporting Life described the match as "between the Sheffield Association and the Sheffield Club". After a rapid thaw made Bramall Lane almost unplayable, and after Providence started the match with ten men, the tie ended 3-3, F.C. scoring a late equalizer from a scrimmage after a corner. The replay, at the same venue, was won by F.C., perhaps because of a number of changes Providence made to the line-up and the consequent lack of integration, and partly because Sheffield had also strengthened by bringing in two players from Nottingham.

The following season, the Wednesday also entered the competition, which removed a number of hitherto-available players from the club, and the draw was not kind, landing Providence with Blackburn Rovers, which was a professional club professing to be amateur. By 1881-82, other Sheffield clubs were entering, and Providence was forced to rely on its own membership.

=== Park Grange F.C. ===
In the summer of 1882, the club took over the Exchange and Perseverance clubs, and changed its name to Park Grange. Under the latter name, the club enjoyed its best run in a local competition, being one of the final three teams in the Sheffield & Hallamshire Senior Cup; after beating Mexborough 1-0 and losing 2–0 to Lockwood Brothers F.C. the club was declared runners-up.

The only entries the club made to the FA Cup under the Park Grange name were in 1887-88 and 1888–89. In the former year, the club lost 6–3 at Long Eaton Rangers, with Rangers scoring in the first minute without Park Grange touching the ball; the Grange did bring the score back to 2-2 and 3–3 before Rangers broke clear in the second half. It was the club's last appearance in the main rounds.

=== Exchange F.C. ===
The Exchange Cricket Club still existed and in 1888 Park Grange and the cricketers put on a joint athletics competition. Perhaps prompted by that, at the start of the 1888–89 season, the club changed its name to the Exchange Football Club. However, despite a decent fixture list, the club "lost several of their most players" and did not survive to the following season.

=== League and cup history ===
Park Grange League and Cup history
Season	FA Cup
1879–80	2nd Round
1880–81	1st Round
1881–82	1st Round
1887–88	1st Round
1888–89	3rd qualifying round

== Colours ==
The club originally played in red and white, but from 1877, when, as the Sheffield rules merged with Football Association laws, the club changed to red and grey.

== Honours ==
=== League ===
None

=== Cup ===
- Sheffield & Hallamshire Senior Cup
  - Runners-up: 1884–85

== Records ==
- Best FA Cup performance: 2nd Round, 1879–80
