= Hotspur F.C. (1878) =

Hotspur
- Full name: Hotspur Football Club
- Nickname: the Spurs
- Founded: 1878
- Dissolved: 1890?
- Ground: The Cricketers, Battersea Park
Home colours

Hotspur F.C. was an association football club who originally played at Battersea Park in London.

The club has no link with Tottenham Hotspur, which came from the Hotspur Cricket Club founded in 1880, but which had to add "Tottenham" in April 1884 because post to the Hotspur club was being diverted to north London.

== History ==
The club was founded in 1878 and took its name from Harry Hotspur. Its membership was restricted to "gentlemen in the service of the London School Board".

The club entered the FA Cup for the first time in 1879–80. It beat the Argonauts in the first round, following a replay, and lost at West End in the second. The club's best run in the Cup came in 1881–82, when it won three ties to reach the fourth round (which that year was made up of 14 clubs), losing 5–0 to Upton Park.

Hotspur also reached the final of the London Senior Cup in 1885–86. The club was given no chance against the Ashburnham Rovers, which was essentially the Old Westminsters under another name, in the final at the Oval, but the club only lost 2–1, despite being pressed all match; the credit being given to goalkeeper Charles Crisp, full-back Gaymer, and the "careless kicking at goal" by Bain - Wagstaffe scoring the Hotspur goal on a breakaway.

The club consistently entered the Cup until 1887–88, its last tie being a second round defeat to Dulwich. By that season the club had reduced the number of sides it could field from three to two; in February 1887 its reserve side had a fixture against Tottenham Hotspur. The club remained in existence until at least 1889.

== Colours ==
The club's colours were dark blue shirts with a white Maltese cross, white knickerbockers, and dark blue socks.

== Ground ==
The club originally played at The Cricketers, Battersea Park In 1884 it moved to Merton Hall Farm in Wimbledon.

== Notable players ==
- C. D. Crisp, goalkeeper in the 1885–86 London Senior Cup final
