= St Peter's Institute F.C. =

- Full name: St Peter's Institute Football Club
- Nickname(s): the Institute
- Founded: 1877
- Dissolved: 1886?
- Ground: Battersea Park
Home colours

St Peter's Institute was an association football club, founded in 1877, who originally played at Battersea Park, before moving to the Spencer Arms in Putney by 1883. The club was based at the St Peter's Institute Gymnasium, with links to the local church, in Buckingham Palace Road, and the club's emblem, worn on its caps in 1885, was a pair of crossed keys.

== History ==
The club's first recorded match was a 1–0 defeat to St Stephen's in November 1877. The club entered the FA Cup twice, losing in the first round both times. In 1879-80, the club lost to Mosquitoes F.C. in a match played at Nunhead. In 1880-81, the club lost 8–1 to Hendon, this time playing at Brixton.

As the game moved towards professionalism, St Peter's remained a gentlemen's club, and did not enter the FA Cup again. Six of the club's players, including captain J. Wright and leading scorer H. Daville, moved to the newly founded Morton Rangers of Shepherd's Bush.

The club was a founder member of the London Football Association in 1882 but there are no known records referring to the club after 1885.

== Colours ==
The club listed its colours as the following:

Year	Colour
1879	Blue & black
1880	Light & dark blue
1883	White & dark blue
1885	White, cross keys on cap
