= Morton Rangers F.C. =

Defunct English football club

Morton Rangers
- Full name: Morton Rangers Football Club
- Founded: 1880
- Dissolved: 1889?
- Ground: Uxbridge Road
- Secretary: Charles Henry Nicholls
Home colours

Morton Rangers was an association football club based in Shepherd's Bush.

== History ==
The club entered the FA Cup once, in 1881–82, losing to the Old Foresters in the first round. The club's starting eleven was made up of seven players who had played for St Peter's Institute the previous season, and four from the newly-defunct Clarence. The club's president, Henry Morton Carr, had been secretary of the Clarence and honorary secretary of the institute.

The club was a founder member of the London Football Association in 1882 and lost 1–0 to Somerset in the first round of the London Senior Cup in 1884, its last reported match under the name being a win in Southend against the obscure Rochford Hundred in 1886.

The club shortened its name to Rangers F.C., and played in the London Senior Cup in 1888 and in the Surrey Cup until 1889.

== Colours ==
The club's colours were described as light blue and black.

== Ground ==
The club played on the Uxbridge Road in Shepherd's Bush, using the Coningham Arms as its headquarters. By 1884 the club had moved to a ground in Wandsworth.
