= Derbyshire F.C. =

Derbyshire
- Full name: Derbyshire Football Club
- Nickname: the Derbeians
- Founded: 1871
- Dissolved: 1884
- Ground: County Cricket Ground
- President: Mr C. C. Bowring
- Secretary: W. Shaw
Home colours

Derbyshire F.C., often referred to as Derby F.C., was an English association football club, based at the Derbyshire County Cricket Ground in Derby, England.

== History ==
The Derbyshire club was founded in 1871 and was originally the representative side of the Derbyshire Football Association, representing a dozen Derbyshire sides and playing under Sheffield rules as well as Association laws. Until 1878 the Derbyshire club was still claiming to have an available membership of 200, but as more sides arose in the county, and the Sheffield rules merged with Association rules, there was less need for a representative side; indeed the Derbyshire side failed to turn up for a fixture with the Sheffield FA in February 1878. By the 1878–79 season the club only had 30 members, suggesting it had become a "regular" club, using the Derbyshire name.

The club made its competitive debut in the Sheffield Senior Cup in 1878–79, but lost 2–1 at Spital, the tight Factory Ground not being conducive to Derby's "fast and vigorous play"; Derby protested that four of the Spital players were "ringers", being Nottinghamshire men, but the protest was adjourned, and Derby withdrew from the Sheffield Football Association in protest.

The club therefore resorted to the Birmingham Senior Cup in 1879–80. Two walkovers put the club into the last six, at which stage it faced Saltley College at the Aston Lower Grounds. Derby won the game 3–0, but a protest was made that one of the Derby players was "cup-tied", having already played for Wednesbury Strollers in the Sheffield Senior Cup; the competition rules barred players from playing for different sides in different competitions. The protest was upheld and the College team put into the final. Derby's only win in the competition was a 4–0 first round win over Birmingham Pickwick in 1880–81.

The club was by now being referred to as Derby Town, and it first entered the FA Cup in 1880–81, playing Notts County at Trent Bridge in the first round. At half-time Derby was 4–1 up, and although Notts scored twice in the second half, it appeared Derby had won through to the second round. However, with the score at 4–2, Notts claimed to have scored a goal, which the umpire disallowed as having previously allowed a Derby appeal that the ball had gone out of play. As the referee's decision was not final at the time, Notts appealed to the FA that the goal was a good one, and the Football Association allowed the appeal, thus ordering a replay. Notts won the replay 4–2, after 15 minutes of extra time, and Derby appealed the result on the basis that Derby had a goal disallowed during normal time that would have won them the match; this time the FA turned down the appeal.

The club suffered a blow in 1881 when the Midland Railway formed its own club - Derby Midland - and many of Town's best players, including captain Evans, turned out for their employer's club. Its defeat to Small Heath Alliance in the first round of the 1881–82 FA Cup was its final FA Cup tie and the defeat to Derby Midland in the Birmingham Senior Cup a month later its final competitive match. By 1884, the county cricket club had formed a new football team, and Derby Town was absorbed into the new club as a reserve outfit.

== Colours ==
The club wore white until 1875–76, then scarlet and white (probably in hoops) until 1878–79. For its FA Cup appearances the club wore black shirts.

== Grounds ==
The club played at the Derbyshire cricket ground, then known as the South Derbyshire ground.
