= Shin guard =

Equipment that protects the shin from injury

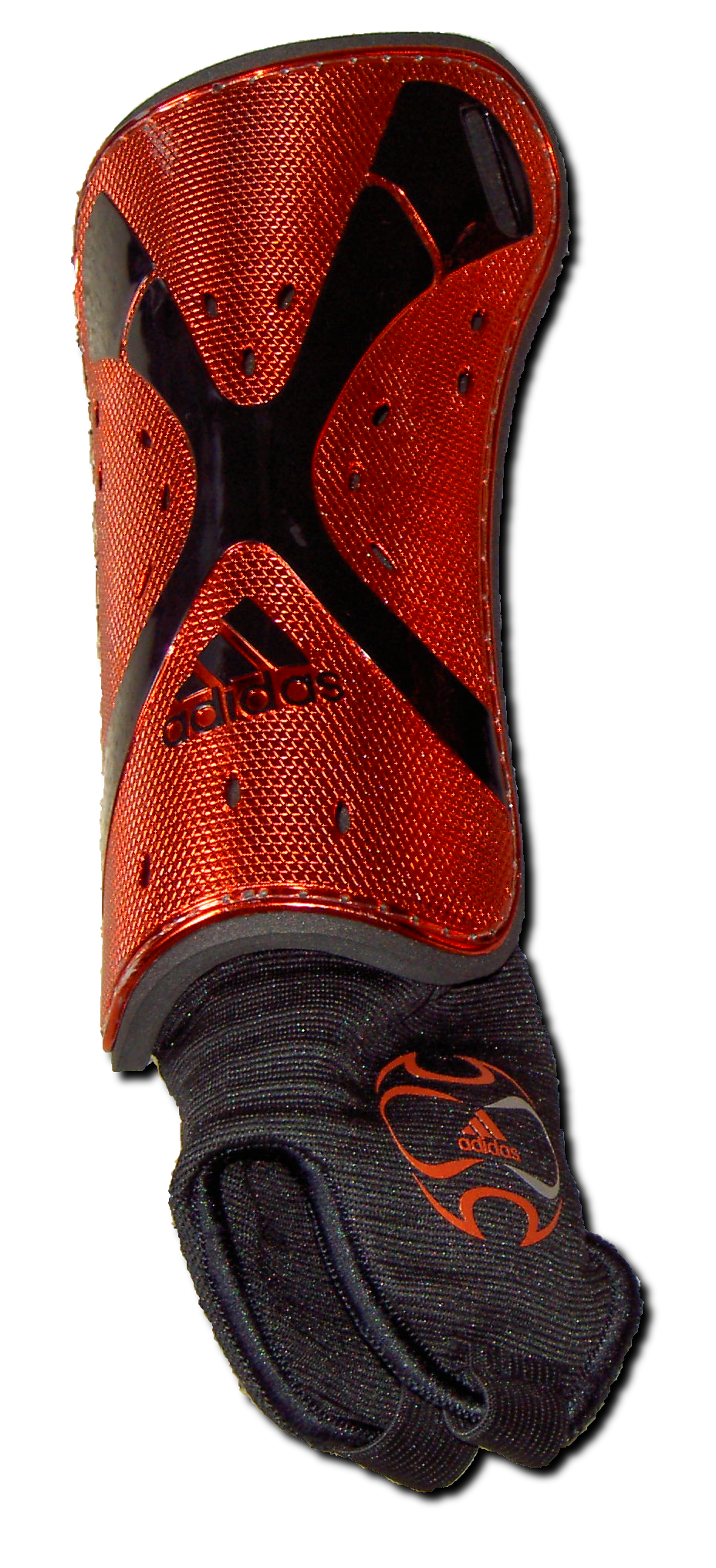
Football shin pad.

A shin guard or shin pad is a piece of equipment worn on the front of an athlete's shin to protect it from injury. These are commonly used in sports including association football, baseball, ice hockey, field hockey, lacrosse, cricket and mountain bike trials. They are also used in combat sports and martial arts competitions including kickboxing, mixed martial arts, taekwondo, karate and professional wrestling. This is due to either being required by the rules/laws of the sport or worn voluntarily by the participants for protective measures.

== Materials ==
Modern day shin guards are made of many differing synthetic materials, including, but not limited to:

- Fibreglass - Stiff, sturdy, and light weight.
- Foam rubber - Very light weight, but not as sturdy and solid as fibreglass.
- Polyurethane - Heavy and sturdy, which offers almost complete protection from most impacts.
- Plastic - Less protective than any of the other synthetic shin guards.
- Metal - Highly protective, but very heavy and uncomfortable.
- Auxetic polymers - Flexible non-Newtonian materials

== History ==
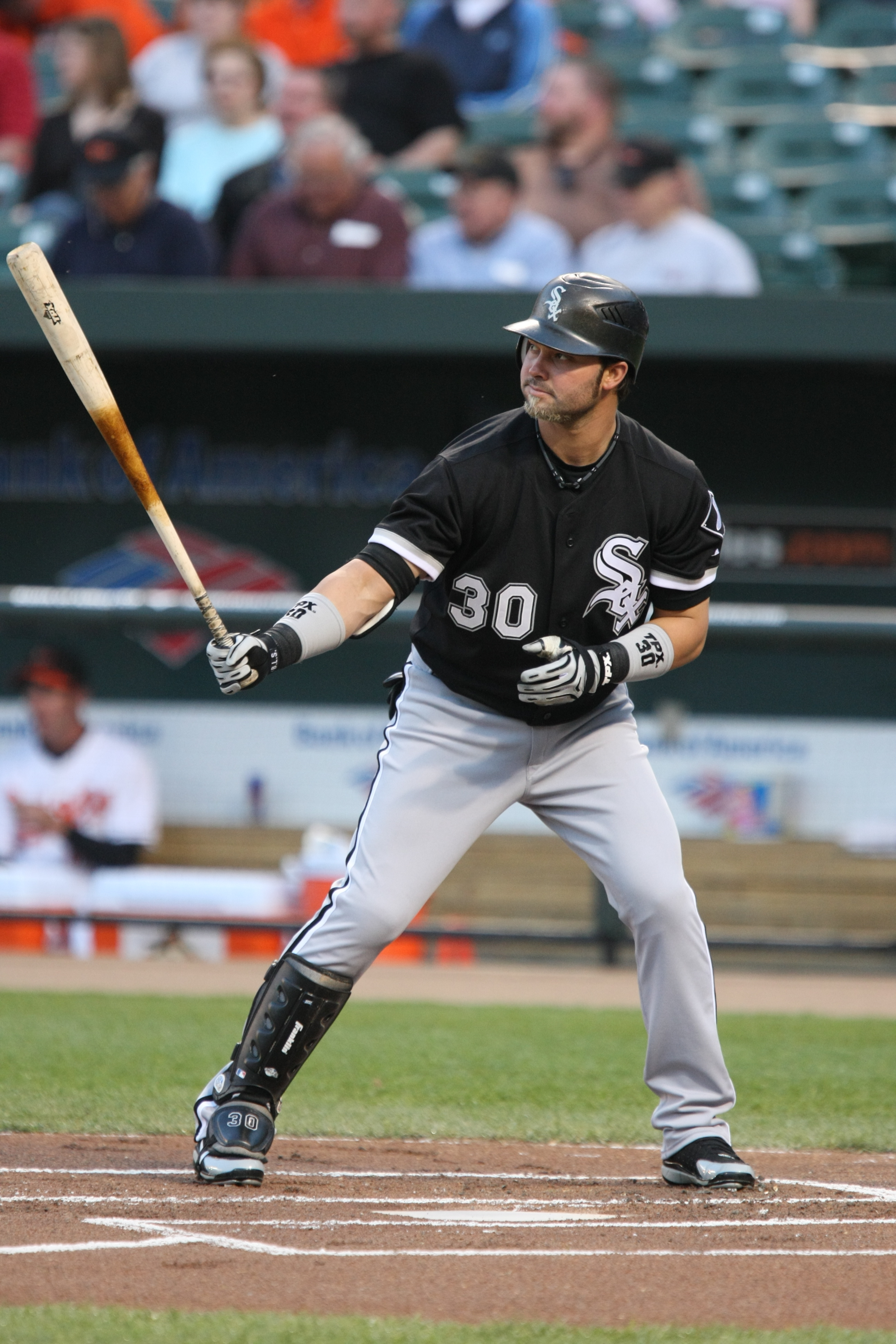
Nick Swisher wearing a shin guard while batting

The shin guard was inspired by the concept of a greave. A greave is a piece of armour used to protect the shin. It is a Middle English term, derived from an Old French word, greve (pronounced gri’v), meaning shin or shin armour. The etymology of this word not only describes the use and purpose of shin guards, but also contributes to dating the technology.

This technology dates back to ancient times as early as Greek and Roman Republics. Back then, shin guards were viewed as purely protective measures for warriors in battle and were made of bronze or other hard, sturdy materials. The earliest known physical proof of the technology appeared when archaeologist Sir William Temple discovered a pair of bronze greaves with a Gorgon's head design in the relief on each knee capsule. It was estimated that the greaves were made in Apulia, a region in Southern Italy, around 550/500 B.C. This area fell under the Roman Empire boundaries and is known as today as the Salento Peninsula; it is more commonly known as the heel of Italy. This discovery is not considered the oldest known application of shin guards, but all other references lie in written or pictorial medians. The oldest known reference to shin guards was a written verse in the Bible. 1 Samuel 17:6 describes Goliath, a Philistine champion from Gath, who wore a bronze helmet, coat of mail, and bronze leggings. The Book of Samuel is commonly accepted to be written by Prophets Samuel, Nathan, and Gad between 960 and 700 B.C. Later, more concrete, examples of the shin guard concept resurfaced in the Middle Ages. All studies and evidence show greaves were improved to cover the entire lower leg, front and back, from the feet to the knees, and were mostly made of cloth, leather, or iron.

As time progressed into the 19th century a major shift in the application of shin guards occurred. The overall purpose of protecting the shin was maintained, but instead of being used for fighting, it became applied to sports. This paradigm shift dominates today's market use of shin guards as they are used mostly in sports. Other applications do exist though for protecting the lower leg in other physical activities such as hiking, mixed martial arts, and kickboxing, but all these activities can also be considered for sport instead of being necessary in battle.

Cricket was the first sport to adopt the use of shin guards. The introduction of this equipment was not motivated by the need for protection, but rather a strategic device to gain an advantage for the batsman. The batsman who wore the leg pads was able to cover the stumps with his protected legs and prevent the ball from hitting the stumps, instead the ball bowled into the batsman. Thus, the protection provided by the leg pads provided the batsman confidence to play without suffering pain or injury. This resulted in an offensive advantage; instead of hitting the wickets to get the batsman out, the bowler hits the batsman giving him another chance to hit the ball. This was addressed in 1809 with a rule change called leg before wicket, where the umpire was allowed to deduce whether the ball would have hit the stumps if the batter was not hit first. Leg pads became more popular as protective measures against the impact from the ball and are worn by the batsman, the wicket-keeper, and the fielders that are fielding in close to the batsman.

Association football was the next major sport to see the introduction of the shin guard. Sam Weller Widdowson is credited for bringing shin guards to the sport in 1874. He played cricket for Nottinghamshire and football for Nottingham Forest, and he got the idea to protect himself based on his cricket experiences. Widdowson cut down a pair of cricket shin pads and strapped them to the outside of his stockings using straps of leather. Other players ridiculed him initially, but shin guards eventually caught on as players saw the practical use of protecting their shins. Today, there are a two basic types of shin guards used in association football: slip-in shin guards and ankle shin guards.

In baseball, one of the innovators of the modern shin guard, New York Giants catcher Roger Bresnahan, began wearing shin guards in 1907. Made of leather, the guards were fastened with straps and hooks. Batters began wearing shin guards at the plate in the late 1980s and early 1990s.

After the application of shin guards in association football, they quickly spread to other sports and are now considered necessary for most contact sports.

== See also ==
- Baseball clothing and equipment
- Chaps
- Cricket clothing and equipment
