= Gresham F.C. =

Gresham
- Full name: Gresham Football Club
- Founded: 1874
- Dissolved: 1898?
- Ground: South Hackney Common
Home colours

Gresham F.C. was an association football club who played at Victoria Park in South Hackney in London, originally using the Penshurst Arms public house for the club facilities.

== History ==
The club was founded in 1874 and shared a name with a rugby union club from Peckham Rye founded in the same year. The club was associated with the City firm of Messrs Morley, a firm of solicitors whose partners included Ebenezer Cobb Morley, one of the founding fathers of the Football Association, and who stepped down as president the year of Gresham's foundation. The firm was based at Gresham House on Old Broad Street, London.

The first recorded match for the club was in November 1874. It first entered the FA Cup in 1876–77, losing to Forest School in the first round, in a match so low-key that newspapers did not carry a match report. It next entered the competition in 1879–80, beating Kildare away from home in the first round, but losing heavily to the Grey Friars club in the second. Despite conceding nine goals, the press had praise for Gresham's goalkeeper J. Davis "for his excellent defence in the Gresham goal, thus saving his side from a more overwhelming defeat." Grey Friars were impressed enough to invite Davis to join them, and in the 1880–81 FA Cup Davis played in the Friars' goal in all of their ties.

The Grey Friars defeat was Gresham's final match in the Cup. Club secretary H. J. Morison acted as referee in an FA Cup match in 1881, and the club was not among the founder members of the London Football Association in 1882. However the club played at a low-key amateur level for at least the next 15 years, including reaching the final of the City of London Shield in 1896, for clubs whose base was within the traditional City.

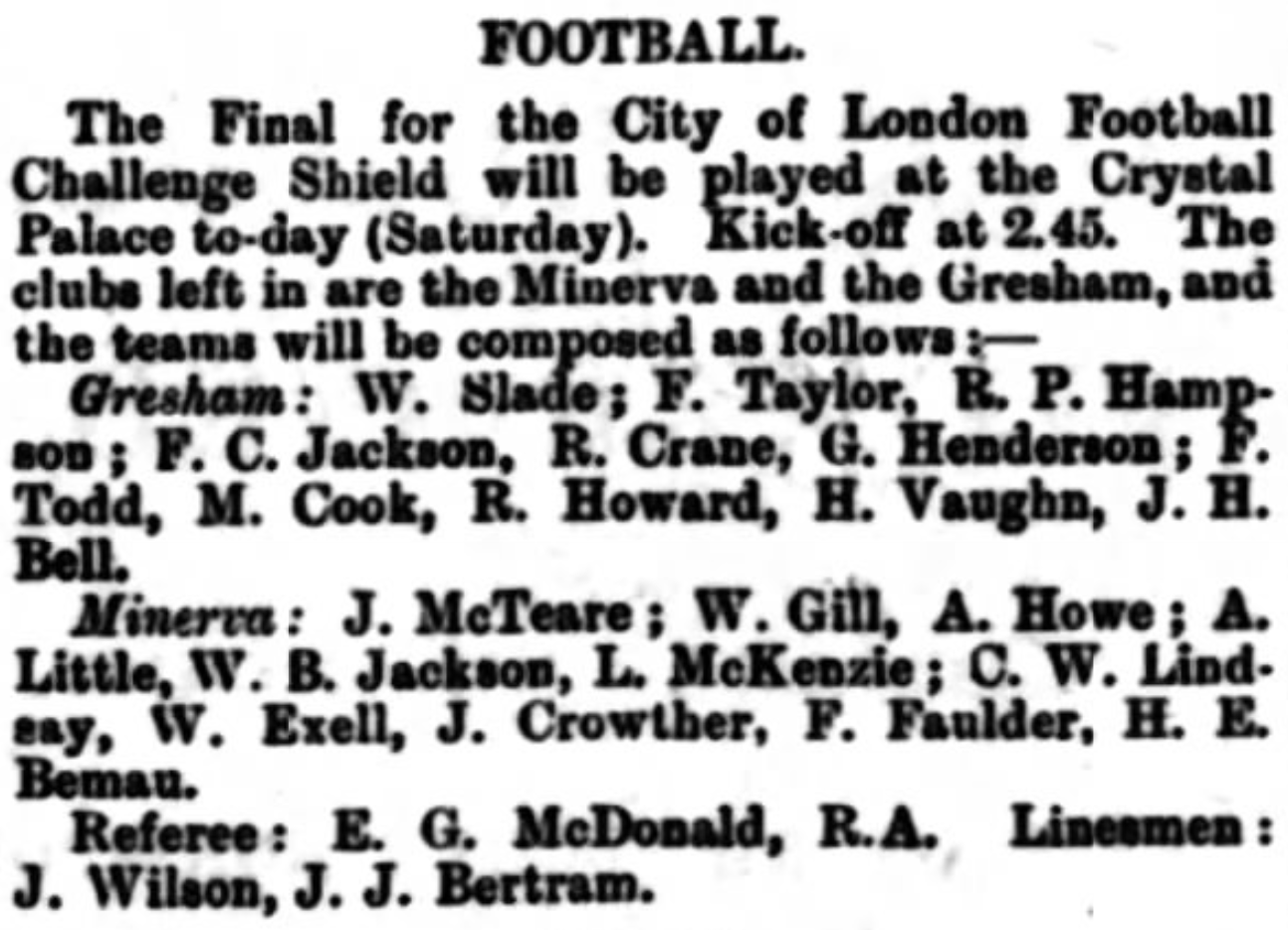
Line-ups for the 1896 City of London Challenge Shield final between Minerva and Gresham, which Minerva won 4-0

== Colours ==
The club's colours were black jerseys with a broad scarlet stripe around waist and arms, black stockings, and black caps with a scarlet stripe.

== Ground ==
The club's earliest ground was at Tufnell Park. By 1876 it was playing at Victoria Park on South Hackney Common, and originally had its facilities at the Penshurst Arms on Penshurst Road. By 1880 it had moved its headquarters to the Bedford Hotel on Victoria Park Road. The club is recorded as playing in Palmers Green up until at least 1898.
