= Woodford Bridge F.C. =

Woodford Bridge
- Full name: Woodford Bridge Football Club
- Nickname: the Bridge
- Founded: 1880; 146 years ago
- Dissolved: c. 1887; 139 years ago
- Ground: Snakes Lane
Home colours

Woodford Bridge FC was an English association football club based in Woodford Bridge, Essex. The club was founded in 1880 and entered the FA Cup from 1881–82 to 1883–84 without winning a tie.

== History ==
The teams in the original 1st round tie with Reading Abbey in the 1881–82 FA Cup, Woodford Times, 29 October 1881

The club's first entry to the national competition in 1881–82 was the club's best performance, as it held Reading Abbey to a draw, going down to a late goal in the replay. Indeed the club was the author of its own misfortune; in the original game, Overton gave the club the lead after a run up the right-wing, conceded an equalizer when confused over an offside decision, and lost its claim to a second and winning goal, as in the move leading to the goal, Woodford Bridge had claimed handball against the Abbey, and the referee decided that the umpire had made a decision in Woodford Bridge's failure before it scored. Its second FA Cup entry, in 1882–83, saw it drawn to play the Royal Engineers, who, although a shadow of their former selves, still easily won 3–1, despite the Bridge taking a wind-assisted early lead.

The club claimed a successful season in 1884–85, winning 13 of its 22 matches, including two ties in the London Senior Cup for the only time, and reaching the final of the second Essex Senior Cup. The club survived a protest from the Forest Rangers club from Epping over whether one of the Bridge players (Pottinger) was genuinely a member of the club, although, given that Woodford Bridge had won the tie 7–1, the protest was considered to be nothing but a "waste of time". In the semi-final the club beat Colchester (Town) at Brentwood by the same scoreline, but lost to the Old Foresters in the final at Chelmsford 7–0, in a match that only lasted 75 minutes as the referee called for time after half-an-hour in the second half; by the time he had been persuaded to bring the teams back for the last 15 minutes, many of the Bridge players had already left.

Despite this successful competition run, the club did not enter the FA Cup for 1885–86, and that season was knocked out in the third round of the Essex competition by competition debutants Ilford.

The club was still active at the start of the 1886–87 season, being represented at the Essex County Football Association half-yearly meeting and entering the Essex Senior Cup that season, but the last record of a match for the club is a friendly with Chigwell School in March 1887. The next reference to a club in the town after this is to Woodford F.C. in 1896, which was almost certainly a separate club.

== Colours ==
According to the Charles Alcock annuals, the club's colours were blue and amber for 1880–81, blue and white for 1881–1884, and dark blue with an amber Maltese cross for 1884–85. In practice these all probably refer to the same design.

== Ground ==
The club originally used the White Hart in Woodford Bridge as its headquarters, and by 1884 it had a private ground known variously as Glengate or Glenhall, in Snakes Lane, near the Railway Arms.
