= Cambridge University Association Football League =

- Founded: 19th century

The Cambridge University Association Football League (CUAFL) is a football league between the Colleges of Cambridge University organised by the Cambridge University Association Football Club.

== History ==
=== Origins of collegiate football ===
Football in Cambridge was being played on Parker's Piece as far back as the 1830s. However it was not until 1855 that the university had a formal football club, Cambridge University Association Football Club, making it one of the oldest clubs in the world. Collegiate football helped spread the game in the 1870s, and the first competition for these teams was held in 1882–1883. The format was a knockout tournament based on the FA Challenge Cup, which had been created in 1871. The first entrants included nine colleges (Caius, St. John's, Clare, St. Catharine's, Pembroke, Sidney, Jesus, King's and Trinity Hall) and three old boys sides (Old Harrovians, Trinity Etonians and Trinity Rest). It is likely that the university, quick to follow The FA in hosting a cup competition, also soon followed the idea of William McGregor, the founder of The Football League, by creating the Cambridge University Association Football League.

=== The Modern Era ===
For the 2006–2007 season, the number of teams in the league reached 78, and in the 2007–2008 season, 31 clubs and 75 teams entered CUAFL competitions. This means that at least 800 people play college football each season, however this is a very conservative estimate.

== Competitions ==
CUAFL organises Seven divisions as well as four cup competitions, 'Cuppers' and the Plate for first teams, the Shield for second teams and the Vase for lower teams.

Cuppers is a knockout tournament with pairings drawn completely at random at the first captain's meeting of the season. There are no seeds and byes are only awarded if the number of entrants requires them. The final is contested the neutral venue of Grange Road. The competition starts in the fourth week of Michaelmas term. In 2004–2005, 31 teams entered the competition, including 26 full colleges, one college affiliated to the university, two local schools, and Cambridge's other university, ARU. To be eligible for entry, teams must be affiliated to CUAFL. Each club may only enter one team, which must be their 1st team. There are five rounds in total.

Cuppers was first contested in 1882–1883. The first entrants included nine colleges (Caius, St. John's, Clare, St. Catharine's, Pembroke, Sidney, Jesus, King's and Trinity Hall) and three old boys sides (Old Harrovians, Trinity Etonians and Trinity Rest).

The Plate competition is for teams that have been knocked out in the first round.

In recent years, when St. Catharine's College has been victorious in Cuppers they have challenged the Oxford University Cuppers Champions to a one-off "Supercuppers" match. In 2007, they defeated Brasenose College Oxford 3–2 (after extra time) in a match held at St. Catharine's Sports Fields, Cambridge. In 2009, they played St. John's College Oxford at Iffley Road, Oxford, and again were victorious 3–2.

Girton College went mixed in 1976 and the first male under-graduates arrived in October 1979. The college started playing in the college league, in division 5, for the first time in the 1980–81 season and won two successive promotions. In season 1986–87, with two blues players, Chris Elliott and Ian McKinnon, they made it through to the semi-finals of Cuppers, losing narrowly in extra time to Downing. By 1993–94, they made it to the top division and in 1997–98, they were crowned league champions for the first time, a feat they repeated in 2003–04. In 1995 they won Cuppers for the only time in their history, beating APU in the final. Since then they have been Cuppers Runners up on 5 occasions, in 1999, 2001, 2003, 2008 and 2018.

Since 2014, Homerton College and Gonville & Caius College, the only two colleges with fourth teams that year, have competed for the Bucket in an annual informal 'cup' match. Homerton College won the inaugural contest 1–0. As of 2021, Gonville & Caius College hold the Bucket.

Fitzwilliam established the greatest era of any college team in the mid 2010s, going on to win 7 successive cuppers and 7 league titles in 9 years with a series of dominant performances. Their cuppers run was ended by defeat to St John's in the 2023/24 semi-final, who subsequently lost on penalties to St Catharine's after a 0-0 draw in the final, giving a different cuppers winner for the first time since 2016. This was followed up by Jesus' third ever cuppers win in 2024/25, when they beat Trinity Hall on penalties after a goalless draw on a difficult pitch at Grange Road. Jesus' Cai La Trobe-Roberts scored 14 goals in the 2024/25 cuppers campaign to finish as top scorer.

The 2025/26 season saw Fitzwilliam claim the double, securing their 17th cuppers title, the most ever and surpassing Christ's College who they previously shared 16 with. The final was competed on the redeveloped Grange Road 4G pitch, with Fitzwilliam clinching a 2-1 victory over Selywn.

=== Results ===
The results of the principal competitions are shown below.

Season	Division 1 Champions	Cuppers Champions	Plate Winners	Shield Winners	Vase Winners
1945–1946		St. John's			
1946–1947		NO CONTEST			
1947–1948		Fitzwilliam House			
1948–1949		Christ's			
1949–1950		St. John's			
1950–1951		Emmanuel			
1951–1952		St. Catharine's			
1952–1953		Emmanuel			
1953–1954		Christ's			
1954–1955		Emmanuel			
1955–1956		Downing			
1956–1957		Christ's			
1957–1958		Christ's			
1958–1959		St. John's			
1959–1960		Christ's			
1960–1961		Christ's			
1961–1962		Christ's			
1962–1963		Christ's			
1963–1964		Christ's			
1964–1965		Christ's			
1965–1966		Christ's			
1966–1967					
1967–1968					
1968–1969		Fitzwilliam & Queens' (Shared)			
1969–1970		St. John's			
1970–1971		Christ's			
1971–1972					
1972–1973					
1973–1974		Trinity			
1974–1975		St. Catharine's			
1975–1976		St. Catharine's			
1976–1977		St. Catharine's			
1977–1978		St Catharine's			
1978–1979		Christ's			
1979–1980		Christ's			
1980–1981		St. Catharine's & Downing (Shared)			
1981–1982		St. Catharine's			
1982–1983		St. Catharine's			
1983–1984		Trinity Hall			
1984–1985	Robinson	St. John's			
1985–1986		Fitzwilliam & St. Catharine's (Shared)			
1986–1987	Fitzwilliam	Selwyn			
1987–1988		Downing			
1988–1989					
1989–1990					
1990–1991		St. John's			
1991–1992		Fitzwilliam			
1992–1993	Trinity	Downing			
1993–1994	Anglia University	Fitzwilliam			
1994–1995	Downing	Girton			
1995–1996	Fitzwilliam	Long Road	Girton		
1996–1997	Downing	Long Road	Clare		
1997–1998	Girton	Fitzwilliam	Magdalene		
1998–1999	Fitzwilliam	Christ's	Homerton	Long Road II	
1999–2000	Jesus	Long Road	APU	Fitzwilliam II	
2000–2001	St Catharine's	St. Catharine's	Homerton	Fitzwilliam II	
2001–2002	Fitzwilliam	Long Road	Churchill	Hills Road II	
2002–2003	St John's	St. John's	Kings	Hills Road II	
2003–2004	Girton	St. John's	Clare	APU II	
2004–2005	Fitzwilliam	Jesus	Gonville & Caius	APU II	
2005–2006	Churchill	Fitzwilliam	Anglia Ruskin	Long Road II	ARU III
2006–2007	Churchill	St. Catharine's	Corpus Christi		St. Catharines's III
2007–2008	Trinity	Christ's	St. Catharine's	Gonville & Caius II	
2008–2009	Downing	St. Catharine's	Pembroke	Trinity Hall II	Churchill III
2009–2010	Downing	Trinity			
2010–2011	Trinity	Queens'			Jesus III
2011–2012	Downing	Fitzwilliam	Trinity Hall	Homerton II	Jesus III
2012–2013	Fitzwilliam	Fitzwilliam	Selwyn	Selwyn II	Jesus III
2013–2014	Trinity Hall	Jesus	Robinson	Fitzwilliam II	Jesus III
2014–2015	Downing	St John's	Selwyn	Jesus II	Girton III
2015–2016	Queens'	Robinson	Christ's	Queens' II	Queens' III
2016–2017	Fitzwilliam	Fitzwilliam	Selwyn	Fitzwilliam II	Fitzwilliam III
2017-2018	Queens'	Fitzwilliam	Emmanuel	Gonville & Caius II	Gonville & Caius III
2018-2019	Fitzwilliam	Fitzwilliam	Trinity Hall	Queens' II	Fitzwilliam III
2019-2020	Fitzwilliam & Churchill (shared/Covid)	Fitzwilliam & Queens' (shared/Covid)	St. Catharine's	Jesus II	Jesus III
2020-2021	N/A	Fitzwilliam	Gonville & Caius	N/A	N/A
2021-2022	Fitzwilliam	Fitzwilliam	Downing	Fitzwilliam II	
2022-23	Fitzwilliam	Fitzwilliam	Jesus	Homerton II	Trinity III
2023-24	Fitzwilliam	St. Catharine's		St. Catharine's II	Gonville and Caius III
2024-25	Fitzwilliam	Jesus	St John's	St Catharine's II	Gonville and Caius III

The combined results of the Cuppers competition is shown below.

College	Number of Cuppers Titles
Fitzwilliam	17
Christ's	16
St. Catharine's	13
St. John's	9
Long Road	4
Downing	4
Jesus	3
Emmanuel	3
Trinity	2
Queens'	2
Robinson	1
Girton	1
Trinity Hall	1
Selwyn	1

The combined results of the Vase competition (since 2024) is show below.

College	Number of Vase Titles
Gonville and Caius	2

== Board of directors ==
CUAFL President: Dr John Little

Year	Chairman
2001–2002	Chris Palmer
2002–2003	Rod Latham
2003–2004	Will Jobling
2004–2005	Martyn Race
2005–2006	Martyn Race
2006–2007	Bob Myhill
2007–2008	Jamie Aspinall
2008–2009	Rory Scott
2009–2010	Luke Jesson
2010–2011	Mark Baxter
2011–2012	George Deeks
2012–2013	Adam Donald
2013-2014	Matt Reizenstein, Nikos Yerolemou
2014-2015	Nicholas Hilton, Nikos Yerolemou
2015-2016	John Harrison, Marcus Nielsen
2016-2017	John Harrison, Marcus Nielsen
2017-2018	John Harrison, Pablo Lemos Portela
2018-2019	John Harrison
2019-2020	Sam Ernest
2020-2021	Sam Ernest
2021-2022	Sam Ernest
2022-2023	Tom Randall
2023-2024	Dan Lofts
2024-2025	Aaran Mehmood, Aaron Kay
2025-2026	Roddy Simpson
2026-2027	Alex Durrani
