= Saxons F.C. =

English association football club

Saxons
- Full name: Saxons Football Club
- Founded: 1874
- Dissolved: 1877
- Ground: nr Loughborough Road, Brixton
- Secretary: Reginald Whiskard
Home colours

Saxons F.C. was an English association football club from Brixton.

== History ==
The club was founded in 1874. The Saxons' first recorded game was a 2-1 home win against Gresham in January 1875. The club was based in mercantilism - secretary Whiskard a clerk to a tea company in Eastcheap, and his team-mate Rutherford a wine importer in nearby Great Tower Street.

The club only played in the FA Cup once, losing 4–1 at South Norwood in 1876–77; the previous week Saxons has scored 13 past a hapless Gresham. The Cup tie was acrimonious. The Saxons were said to be playing "on the win tie or wrangle principal [sic]", and were "apparently intent upon displaying their powers of polite repartee to make up for their deficiency in the knowledge of the Association rules." The approach did bring the Saxons the benefit of a goal which, according to the spectators, struck the tape and went over, but after the Saxons players "were prepared to take their affidavits that it went under", W.H. White, the South Norwood captain, conceded the goal. It availed the club nothing as South Norwood was already four goals to the good. Frank Haslam, the Saxons' captain, complained that South Norwood kept interrupting the game by claiming offside, and blaming White for "a temper and disposition which totally unfits him for the football field"; however the South Norwood secretary C.E. Leeds complained in turn about the Saxons players regularly disputing refereeing decisions, often in unison, and dismissed the club as "comparatively obscure".

The Saxons' last recorded game a 4–0 home defeat to the Ramblers in February 1877, despite only nine of the visiting players turning up. For the 1877–78 season, many of the Saxons players (including Haslam) joined the new Grey Friars club and the Saxons club was dissolved.

== Colours ==
The club wore dark blue jerseys with a red band around each arm, white knickerbockers, and dark blue stockings.

== Ground ==
The club's ground, near the Loughborough Road in Brixton, was notorious for its muddy conditions.

== Separate Sheffield club ==
They are not to be confused with Saxons FC of Sheffield, formed in 1877 and who were dissolved in around 1880, who played at Norfolk Park, and whose colours were navy blue with a Union Jack on the chest.
