= C. D. Crisp =

English politician and football administrator (1864 – 1956)

Charles Doland Crisp OBE (18 February 1864 – 5 February 1956) was an English local politician and association football administrator. Crisp was Mayor of Lewes for 11 years.

While attached to London Regiment he was made into a Lieutenant colonel. He served in World War I and was appointed an OBE for organising the "all clear" messages after enemy bombing raids. In World War II he was the Air Raid Precautions sub-controller for Lewes.

In a long career in association football, Crisp was a player (goalkeeper), referee and administrator. He founded the Athenian League, was a member of the Football Association council and served as a director of Arsenal and Chelsea. He was chairman of the Middlesex County Football Association from 1907 until 1954.
