= Sam Weller Widdowson =

English sportsman

Widdowson (hand on hip) depicted in an engraving titled "Famous Football Players" issued by the Boy's Own Paper in the early 1880s

Sam Weller Widdowson (16 April 1851 – 9 May 1927) was an English sportsman of the Victorian era. He played cricket for Nottinghamshire and association football for Nottingham Forest and also played once for the England national football team, against Scotland in 1880. Widdowson is also credited with inventing football shin pads in 1874 when he cut down a pair of cricket pads and strapped them outside his stockings. Initially, the concept was ridiculed but it soon caught on with other players, and shin pads are now required by the Laws of the Game. He later became a football referee and was in charge of the first ever match in which goal nets were used. He was Nottingham Forest chairman from 1879 to 1884.
