= Brigg Britannia F.C. =

Brigg Britannia
- Full name: Brigg Britannia Football Club
- Nickname: Swifts
- Founded: 1877
- Dissolved: 1914?
- Ground: Britannia Recreation Ground
Home colours

== History ==
Brigg Britannia F.C., also known as Britannia Recreation and in the 1880s as Brigg Britannia Swifts, was an English association football club from Brigg in Lincolnshire; the club was the winter occupation of members of a cricket club founded in the summer of 1877. The earliest known match for the club was a draw with Lincoln Albion in March 1878. In November 1878 the club was the first opponent of Grimsby Town, then called Grimsby Pelham, Britannia winning 2–0.

The club gained its biggest known win against the Crowle club in a friendly in February 1880, winning 8–0 at home.

Britannia entered the FA Cup three times. In 1880–81 the club was drawn to play Turton and won the toss for choice of grounds. Turton threatened to scratch the tie because of the expense of travelling to Lincolnshire, but did turn up and won easily. The match ended early because of a dispute over the final goal; given that the goal made the score 5–0 to the visitors, and Britannia did not have a single shot all match, the score was allowed to stand.

The club was a founder member of the Lincolnshire Football Association in 1881, and entered the FA Cup a second time. Britannia again lost heavily in the first round, 8–0 to Sheffield F.C. at Bramall Lane, in front of a crowd of 70–80, reduced by rain and a match so one-sided that Sheffield swapped out their goalkeeper after the fifth goal. The club was forced in that match to play William Asling in goal; he was the club's usual right-back, who joined Grimsby Town in 1883 to play at the right-back position. Later in the 1881–82 season the club lost to Barton Town in the first round of the first Lincolnshire Senior Cup.

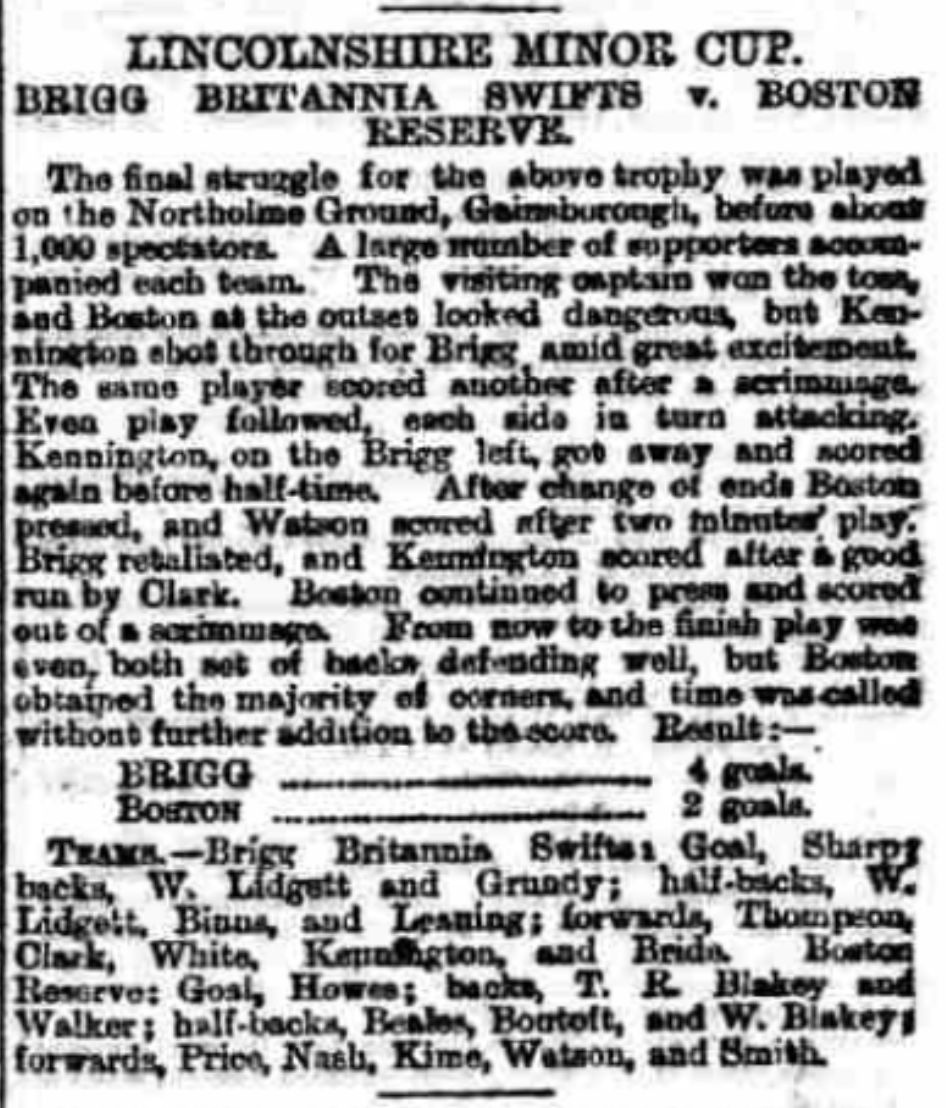
1888 Lincolnshire Shield Final, Brigg Britannia 4–2 Boston, Sheffield Daily Telegraph, 9 April 1888

The club's final FA Cup entry was in 1882–83, but, drawn to face Nottingham Forest and facing a heavy defeat, the club scratched. Britannia remained in existence as an amateur club - in 1889, turning down overtures from Brigg Town to merge - until the outbreak of World War 1, playing in the Lincolnshire Shield for amateur clubs and the Barton & District League, and fixtures are reported until September 1913. The club's greatest honour was winning the Shield in 1888, but its defence was ended by Town in the third round.

== Colours ==
At least from 1906, the club colours were amber & black and white.

== Ground ==
The club played at the Britannia Recreation, behind the Brocklesby Ox Inn, on a pitch notable for its small size. It was also a training ground for runners from Sheffield, and as a result players from The Wednesday often turned out for Britannia.

== Honours ==
Lincolnshire Shield

- 1887–88: winner

== Notable players ==
- Jimmy Lang played as a guest for the club in a friendly against Nottingham Forest in September 1881.
