= A.L. Henry =

Malaysian footballer

Personal information
- Place of birth: Malaysia
- Position: Striker

Senior career*
Years	Team	Apps	(Gls)
–1934	Selangor		
1934	Hendon		
1934–1939	Selangor		
- * Club domestic league appearances and goals

A.L. Henry was a Malaysian footballer who played as a striker.

== Early life ==
Henry played cricket. He attended school in Kuala Lumpur, Malaysia.

== Career ==
In 1934, he signed for English side Hendon. He was described as "rapidly making a name in... [English] soccer circles" while playing for the club. After that, he returned to Malaysian side Selangor. He captained the club. He helped them win the 1935 Malaysia Cup, 1936 Malaysia Cup, and 1938 Malaysia Cup.

== Personal life ==
Henry was of Tamil ethnicity. He was married.
