= Clarence F.C. (England) =

English association football club

Clarence
- Full name: Clarence Football Club
- Founded: 1876
- Dissolved: 1883
- Ground: Battersea Park
- Secretary: Henry Morton-Carr
Home colours

Clarence, sometimes referred to as The Clarence, was an English association football club from Battersea.

== History ==
The club was founded in 1876 by Henry Morton-Carr, an Old Carthusian who later founded the Belgrave Harriers Athletic Club. The club took its name from a hotel in Winstanley Road, near to Battersea Park. It was not an aristocratic club - goalkeeper Thomas Bockmaster was a stonemason, and Cup goalscorer Thomas Wilmshurst a schoolteacher.

The club's first recorded match was a 1–0 win at home to Trojans in 1876. For its first three seasons, the club played mostly low-key matches, many of which were not reported. In 1879–80 the club entered the FA Cup for the first time, but lost 5–2 at Pilgrims F.C. in the first round; Clarence had gone 2–0 behind and pulled it back to 2–2 within the first fifreen minutes, but the second half was dominated by Pilgrims. The following season, the club lost 6–0 at Marlow in the first round, having turned up to the match with only ten men, and seems to have ceased operations soon afterwards; four of its players joined Morton Rangers for 1881–82 and the club was not a member of the London Football Association on the latter's foundation in 1882. Its last record is as being listed as a member of the Football Association in 1883.

The club is not related to another Clarence football club, founded in 1875 as the works side for Maple & Co., which played in an all-black kit out of Willesden Green.

== Colours ==
The club played in blue with red stripes in 1876–77, and changed the following season to blue and black.

== Ground ==
The club played at Battersea Park, and used The Crown on York Road for facilities.
