= Dreadnought F.C. =

Dreadnought
- Full name: Dreadnought F.C.
- Nickname: The Dreadnoughts
- Founded: 1875
- Dissolved: 1887?
- Ground: West Ham Park
- Match Secretary: Francis S. Bacon, William Frank Pettigrew (1881 only)
- Hon. Secretary: Arthur McDonell
1875–81 colours	1881–87 colours

Dreadnought was an English association football club based in London.

== History ==
The club gave its foundation date as 1875, and its first recorded match was a 3–0 defeat away to Upton Park in November that year, although Dreadnought turned up with only eight men and had to rely on three unnamed substitutes.

The club came out of a cricket club and its secretaries were from the middle classes - Francis Bacon, also the club's goalkeeper, being a commercial traveller and William Pettigrew, who also played as a right-winger, an engineer.

The club entered the FA Cup on four occasions. In the first round in 1880–81, the club beat Rochester 2–1, but in the second round lost 5–1 at Old Carthusians. In 1881–82, the club's first round opponents from Caius College withdrew and the club had a bye in the second round, but lost 2–1 at Marlow in the third.

In 1882–83, the club hosted South Reading in the first round, but the match kicked off at 4.15pm because of the late arrival of the visiting South Reading side. Although South Reading won 2–1, Dreadnought appealed the result on two grounds; firstly, having had a goal wrongly disallowed; secondly, the game had ended in darkness, which allowed South Reading to score the winner. The Football Association ordered a replay, which South Reading won again, by the same score, in a "warmly contested" match.

The last match for the club in the competition was its first round defeat by Old Foresters in 1883–84, a match played at the Forest School in Walthamstow rather than the old boys' regular pitch in Snaresbrook; as a sign that the day of the amateur club at the highest levels was over, the crowd did not exceed 200, when ties in the north were attracting over twenty times that amount.

The club took part in the first three editions of the London Senior Cup, but only won one tie. After a 3–0 defeat at Hanover United in the first round of 1884–85, the club reverted to more local football, entering the Essex Senior Cup (which included other clubs from north-east London) until 1886–87.

== Colours ==
The club's colours were described black and white shirts (rather than jerseys) until 1880, and navy shirts, white knickers, and navy socks afterwards.

== Ground ==
The club played at the West Ham Park, using the Manor Taven, and later the Upton Tavern, for facilities.
