= Gonville & Caius A.F.C. =

Association football club in England

Gonville and Caius AFC
- Full name: Gonville & Caius; Association Football Club
- Nickname: Caius
- Ground: Barton Road, Cambridge
- Capacity: 2,000
- President: William Palmer
- Captains: 1s: Kofi Hayford / Cameron Banks 2s: Walter Moyes
- Star Player: Will Derby
- CUAFL 2025-2026: 1s: Division 2, 3rd 2s: Division 3 3s: Division 4
- Website: https://www.instagram.com/caiusafc/?hl=en
Home colours

Gonville & Caius AFC, more commonly known as Caius, is the representative football club of Gonville & Caius College, Cambridge, England. It is one of only a few university teams to have entered the FA Cup 1st round proper.

Caius football club has a long and distinguished history, entering the first Cuppers, the FA Cup 1st round proper in two years of the 19th century. The club has had numerous Blues, as well as an England international and Test cricket captain. Caius play their home games at Barton Road sports ground. The club enters four men's teams and a women's team into the Cambridge University Association Football League.

== History ==
While no one knows exactly when Gonville & Caius College first had an official football club, it is highly likely that members of the college were playing football on Parker's Piece in the mid-19th century with other members of the university. Caius entered a team in the inaugural Cuppers tournament of 1882–1883, but took their place in history by entering the FA Cup in 1880-1881 and 1881–1882 as the only university team in the competition. The last year that Cambridge and Oxford university teams had entered was 1879–1880, the year in which Oxford finished as runners-up to Clapham Rovers. It was left to Caius to continue the Corinthian values of the amateur teams in the face of the impending dominance of professional clubs such as Blackburn Rovers and Preston North End. The challenge by Caius was not to be successful, with the team giving walkovers to Nottingham Forest in 1880 and Dreadnought in 1881. This was to mirror the end of an era for amateur clubs as the last year a university side competed in the 1st round of the FA Cup was the last year an amateur side would win the competition. The achievement of Caius has only been replicated once, in 2003, by Team Bath. Since 1881, Caius has only competed in intra-University competitions. In 2018 Caius won the Men's 2nd team, Men's 3rd team, and Women's Cuppers competition, which was one of the most successful years in club history. The Men’s 3rd team brought home the Vase Trophy in 2024 after a thrilling final and a last minute wonder-goal. At the end of this season, the eight-year career of Fergal Hanna came to an end, and his shirt number was retired. The Vase trophy was brought back to Caius in 2025, after a 7-1 thrashing of Trinity Bruces in the final. At the start of the 25/26 season star player of the 3rd team, Monty Lord, made a covenant to achieve a staggering 69 G/A in a single season, reflecting the number jersey that the young starlet wears on his back. It remains to be seen whether this striking achievement will be fulfilled.

== List of Captains, Presidents and Managers ==
	1s Captain	2s Captain	3s Captain	President	Manager
2021-22	James Wiseman	Harry Atkins	David Evans	Ethan Sorrell	Sean Dyche
2022-23	Ollie Babcock	Adam Wajed	Joel Fenton	Michael Burnley	Sam Allardyce
2023-24	Tom Joyce	Oscar Coburn	Will Morris	Josh Monk	Sam Allardyce
2024-25	Denzel Donkor	Tom Donnachie	Jeshvin Jesudas	Mithil Krishnan	Sam Allardyce
2025-26	Mithil Krishnan	Jeshvin Jesudas	Pat van Hoorn	Cameron Banks	Panayoitis Hadjicostis
2026-27	Kofi Hayford / Cameron Banks	Walter Moyes		William Palmer	Bertie McIntosh
