= Rangers F.C. (London) =

Rangers
- Full name: Rangers Football Club
- Founded: 1876
- Dissolved: 1886
- Ground: various (see below)
- Secretary: Frederick Wall
Home colours

Rangers F.C. was an association football club who originally played on public grounds in London, and in 1884 moved to the cricket ground in Balham.

== History ==
The club was founded in 1876 as St Mark's Guild FC, by members of a teacher training college, the club's first reported game taking place in November that year. In 1877, the club changed its name to Auckland Rangers, and some time before the 1879–80 season dropped the Auckland part of the name. The club's secretary was Frederick Wall, future president of the Football Association, and early players included two of his brothers.

The club entered the FA Cup for the first time in 1880–81. It had the unusual distinction of being drawn against both of the initial FA Cup finalists. In the first round, the club was paired with the Wanderers, who withdrew, being unable to field a team, as its members had chosen to play for old boys' clubs instead. In the second round, the club obtained a bye, and in the third, played the Royal Engineers. The match was played at the Kennington Oval, and the Sappers won 6–0. Rangers' high point was having a goal disallowed for offside, and the club was "overwighted as well as overmatched", while the forwards "made no attempt to dribble, and showed little judgment in passing."

The club entered the FA Cup the following year and was drawn to visit Romford, but, on the morning of the match, was obliged to send a telegram ceding the tie, being unable to raise an XI. Although the club was a founding member of the London Football Association, it did not enter the FA Cup again. The last reference to a club fixture is from the 1885–86 season.

== Colours ==
The club's colours were dark blue and white.

== Grounds ==
The club had a peripatetic existence; it originally played on the west side of Clapham Common, soon moving to a field under the control of the Wandsworth Common Church Institute, Hasking's Sports Ground in Balham, and finally to Balham Cricket Ground in 1884.
