= Hertfordshire Rangers F.C. =

- Full name: Hertfordshire Rangers Football Club
- Nickname: the Rangers
- Founded: 1865
- Dissolved: 1883
- Ground: White Lion Field, Watford
to 1875 colours	after 1875 colours

Hertfordshire Rangers F.C. was a 19th-century English amateur football team based in Watford, Hertfordshire. It competed in the FA Cup and had two players represent England in international matches.

== History ==
Football was first played in Hertfordshire at Belswain's Meadow in 1861, and the Rangers (sometimes referred to as Herts Rangers) was the first proper club in the county, claiming a foundation date in December 1865 and joining the Football Association in 1866. After a practice match between its members in November 1866, its first recorded match against external opposition was against a Westminster XI in December 1866, but the match was played to Westminster School rules (which allowed some running with the ball in hand, permitted opponents to trip a player running with the ball, had a kick-in rather than a throw-in, started the game with the ball being thrown up from the centre of the field, and had goals of 10' x 6') rather than Association laws. Westminster was recorded as victor by 1 "base" to nil.

The club entertained the Wanderers at the end of 1866; initially only 7 Wanderers turned up, albeit their number included stars such as Charles W. Alcock and Arthur Pember of No Names Club. The match ended scoreless.

Despite the club's early start in the game, it did not enter the first FA Cup, only arranging 11 fixtures for the 1871–72 season, two against the Hampstead Heathens which did enter the competition.

The club first entered the FA Cup in 1875–76 and beat Rochester 4–0 in the first round, the first of three wins the club ever had in the competition. In the second round the club lost 8–2 at home to Oxford University; Rangers took the lead after 20 minutes, Gilbert turning a cross in from six yards out, but were 4–1 down by half-time.

The club's best Cup run came in 1880–81, with the club beating Barnes 6–0 in the first round (the club's record competitive win), plus having three disallowed for offside, and getting a bye in the second. In the third round, and in a warning that the club was finding it harder to provide a team, the club only had 10 players for a tie against Old Etonians at the Kennington Oval, and duly lost 3–0.

The Rangers often relied on players from Cambridge University students, as the university did not have a team at the time, and schools at Aldenham and Elstree. In 1881–82 the club lost in the first round to the Swifts and did not enter the competition again; two of the club's players moved to Hendon F.C. and the others appear to have left the sport. When the club ceased operation in January 1883, it was because it was unable to raise representative teams.

A club bearing the same name was formed in 2001, its last fixtures dating from 2017.

== Colours ==
The club's first colours were dark orange and dark green, replaced in 1876 by black and grey.

== Grounds ==
The club's first ground was behind cottages on the Watford High Road, near the Nascott estate, known as the Wood's Field, and by 1868 the club was using the White Lion Field in Watford, 200 yards from Watford railway station. In 1875 the club moved to Cassiobury Park in Upper Nascott. The club used the Clarendon Hotel for its facilities until moving to the Malden Hotel in 1875.

== Notable players ==
Two Rangers players were selected for England:

- Robert Barker (1872)
- Francis Sparks (1879)

== New club formed ==
In May 2008 a new club of the same name was established by Matt Wright. Pat Dee was appointed manager on 26 June 2009. They reached a 2010 cup competition final, which they lost to Albury 3–0.

In October 2011 the 'new' Hertfordshire Rangers won a sponsorship from InterSys who provided the team with a new kit.
