= Grey Friars F.C. =

The Grey Friars Club
- Full name: Grey Friars Football Club
- Nickname(s): the Friars
- Founded: 1877
- Dissolved: 1881
- Ground: Greyhound, Dulwich
- Secretary: R. Rutherford
Home colours

Grey Friars F.C. was an English association football club based in London.

== History ==
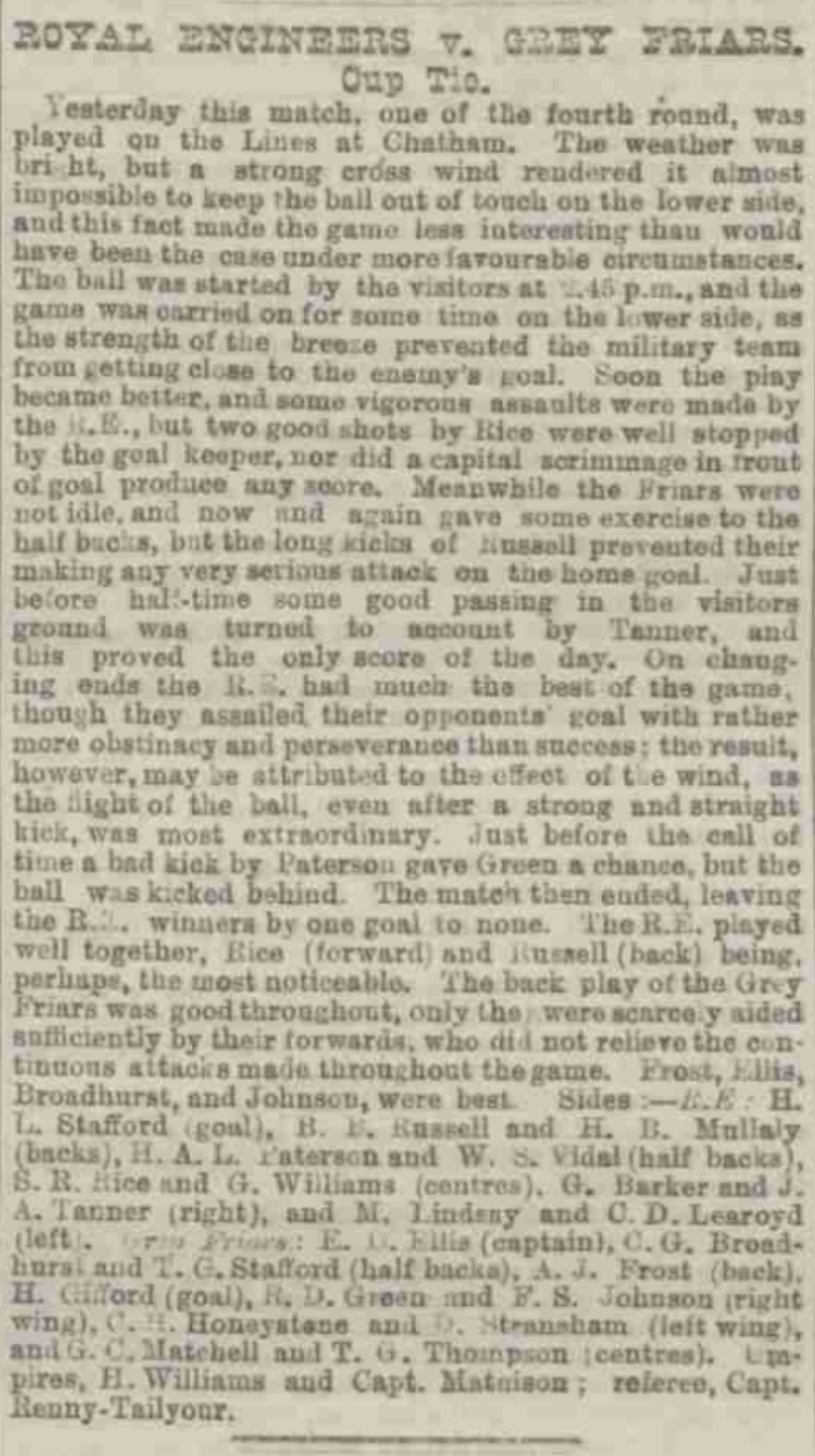
1879–80 FA Cup, Royal Engineers 1–0 Grey Friars, Nottingham Evening Post, 19 February 1880

The club was founded in 1877, made up mostly of members of the now-defunct Saxons. Its players were mostly mercantile middle-class; club secretary Rutherford was a wine importer based at the prestigious 34 Great Tower Street, playing captain Edwin Ellis came from a lace manufacturing family and ran the London sales operation, and the club itself was considered a City of London outfit.

The club's first match, against Woodgrange, included seven ex-Saxons players. The club played 21 matches in its first season, all against London clubs, winning 16 and losing one.

The club did not enter the FA Cup in this first season, but did so for the next three seasons; in 1879–80 the club reached the fourth round (which, that year, was made up of the last ten clubs), losing 1–0 to the Royal Engineers. The club was invited to play at Notts County in the aftermath of that match (possibly due to Ellis' family being Nottingham-based), and held the home side to a 3–3 draw, thanks mostly to the Friars' superior passing game. Ellis was an umpire in the semi-finals that season, nominated by the Old Etonians. In 1880–81 the club reached the same stage, this time a final 12, but lost the Old Etonians.

Despite a strong showing, the club ceased playing before the 1881–82 season. The last reference to the club is to one of its members acting as umpire in an FA Cup tie in November 1881. The club's players either left the game or joined other clubs; two played for Upton Park in 1881–82, one played for St Bartholomew's Hospital, two played for Hendon, and two for Mosquitoes - perhaps notably the last recorded match for the Friars was a 3–2 home defeat to Mosquitoes.

== Colours ==
The club wore cerise and French grey halves.

== Ground ==
The club played at the following home grounds:

Grey Friars grounds
Year	Location	Facilities
1877	Forest Gate	Princess Alice pub
1878	Upton	Spotted Dog pub
1879–81	Dulwich	The Greyhound pub

== Notable players ==
- T.G. Stafford, who played in a trial match to determine the England side to face Scotland in the 1879 international.
- Edwin Ellis, reserve for England v Scotland in 1879
