= West End F.C. (London) =

Defunct football club in England

West End
- Full name: West End Football Club
- Nickname: W.E.
- Founded: 1868
- Dissolved: 1914?
- Ground: Wormholt Farm, Shepherd's Bush
- Secretary: R. A. Palmer
to 1881 colours	from 1883 colours

West End was an English association football club from London, with a claimed foundation date of 1868.

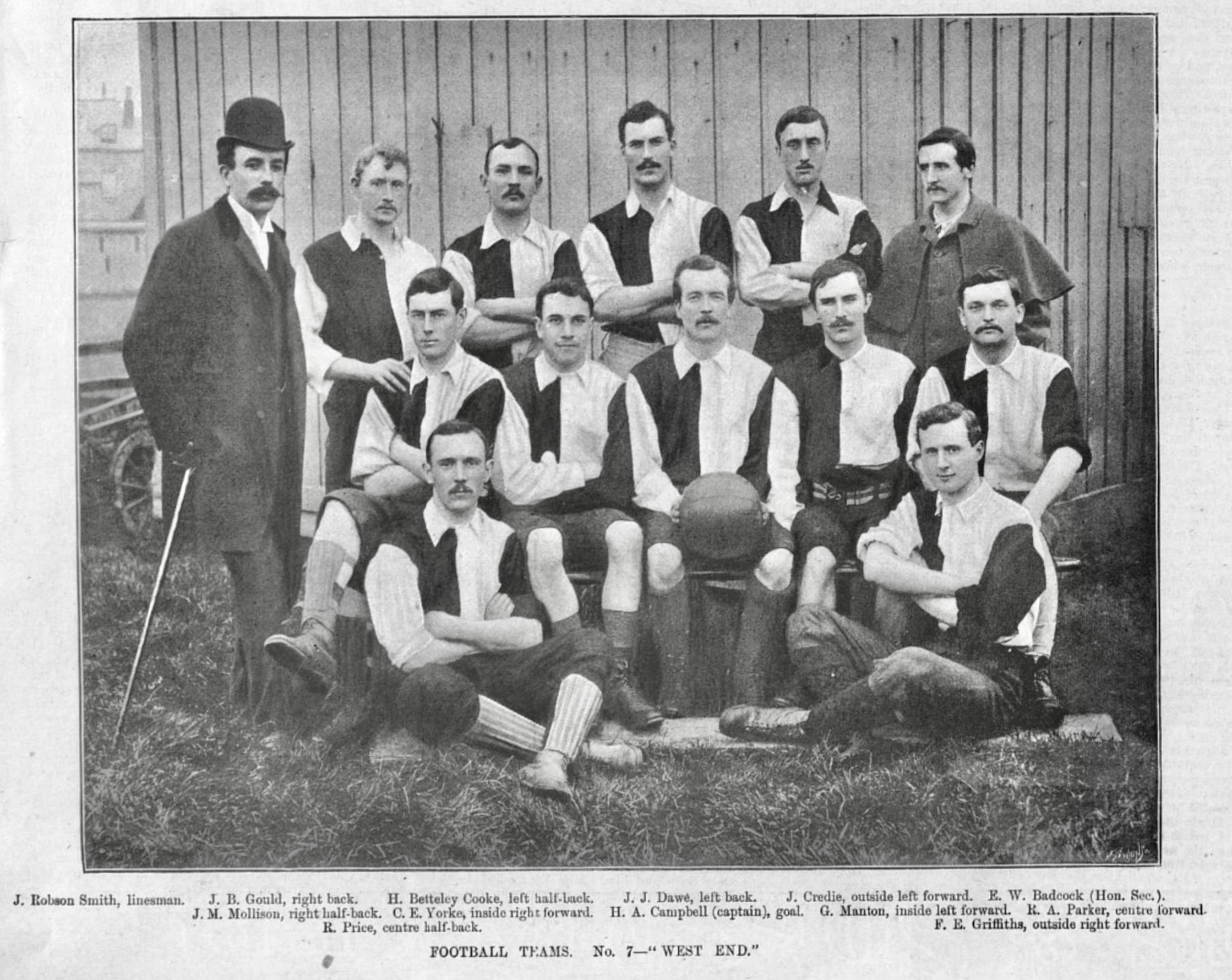
West End Football Club, Illustrated London News, 7 November 1891

== History ==
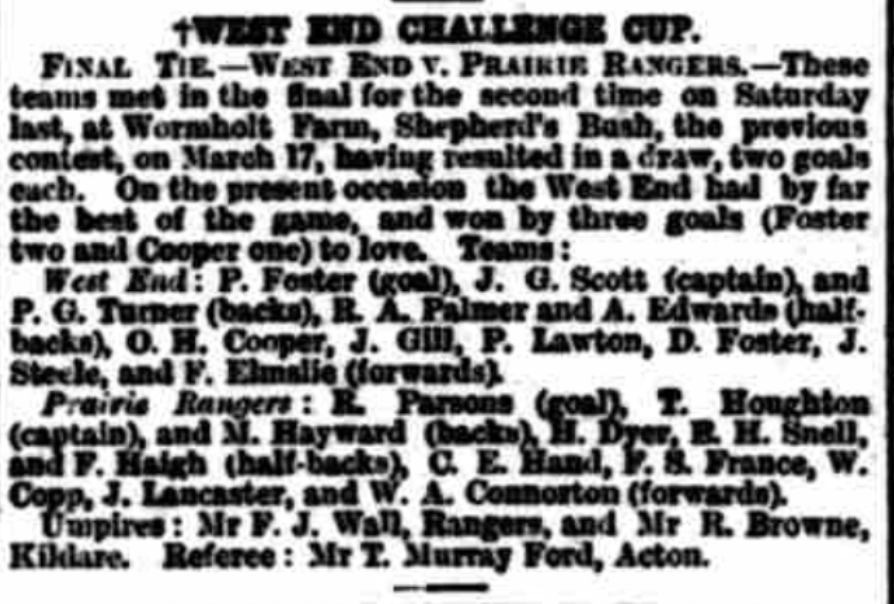
1882–83 West End Challenge Cup final, West End 3–0 Prairie Rangers, Sportsman, 3 April 1883

West End was the works side of the Marshall & Snelgrove department store. The club's first recorded match was in October 1873.

Its first year of entry to the FA Cup was 1879–80, and the club reached the fourth round (last ten), albeit only after one win (1–0 at home to Hotspur), thanks to one bye and one walkover after first-round opponents the Swifts withdrew from the competition, with two of the Bambridge brothers having opted to represent Upton Park instead. At the fourth round stage, West End lost 5–1 to the Old Etonians at the Kennington Oval, the defeat put down to the West End relying on long balls, and consequently losing possession when attacking.

The club reached the second round of the Cup in the next two years. In 1881–82, the club drew 1–1 with Reading, but was disqualified before the replay could take place for an unknown reason.

The club's last FA Cup tie was a 3–3 home draw with Upton Park in the first round in 1884–85, goalkeeper Lyne inadvertently scoring an own goal equalizer near the end, in trying to catch a corner that was heading straight in; had he left it, it would have been no goal, as goals direct from dead-ball kicks were not allowed at the time. The club scratched from the replay to avoid "a tremendous towelling", as full-back J. G. Scott was engaged at the Kennington Oval playing for the London Football Association against the Sheffield Football Association on the replay due date, and without him West End could "offer little resistance".

It had success on a more local level, winning the West End Challenge Cup (set up in 1881 for works sides from "large retail houses") for the first time in 1882–83, by beating Prairie Rangers (the works side of Harvey Nichols) 3–0 in the final replay, at Wormholt Farm; the match attracted an attendance of 1,500, and Cooper gave West End the lead in the first half, Foster scoring twice in the second (the first from following up a parry by Houghton in the Rangers' goal, the second "breasting" home a corner) to secure the cup. It repeated the triumph in 1895.

The club continued playing until at least the 1913–14 season, but references to West End afterwards refer to the West End FA rather than an individual club.

== Colours ==
1878–81	Black & amber stripes and stockings, with white knickers
1881	Blue & amber
1881–83	Blue & white
1883–85	Black & white

== Grounds ==
In 1875, the club was playing at Wormwood Scrubs. By 1877, the club had moved to Wormholt Farm in Shepherd's Bush, In 1878–79, the club was playing at the Royal Oak in Harlesden, but by 1879–80 the club was once more playing at Wormholt Farm, using the Askew Arms for facilities.

In 1905, the Marshall & Snelgrove amalgamated athletic association - the Magpie Athletic Club, formed in 1895 to bring together disparate sports under one umbrella - moved to a new ground in Wembley Park, and the football club took up residence there, albeit keeping the name West End.
