= Mosquitoes F.C. =

Mosquitoes
- Full name: Mosquitoes F.C.
- Nicknames: The Alberts, the Quitoes
- Founded: 1872
- Dissolved: 1884
- Ground: Greyhound, Dulwich
- Secretary: Herbert Russell
Home colours

Mosquitoes was an English association football club from South London, active in the 1870s and 1880s.

== History ==
The club was founded in 1872 under the name Albert, although its first recorded match is not until the 1874–75 season, a 6–0 defeat at a short-handed South Norwood. The club changed its name to Mosquitoes before the 1875–76 season.

The club first entered the FA Cup in 1879–80. In the first round, the club beat St Peter's Institute of Battersea Park, at a neutral ground in Nunhead. In the second round the club lost 7–1 to Hendon, but had the consolation of playing the tie at the Kennington Oval, with Charles Alcock acting as the club's nominated umpire. The club's goal was scored by J. B. Ginger, who had started the game as goalkeeper, but had been moved up front when the score was 3–0.

The club entered the FA Cup for the next four seasons, but only won one more tie, in 1883–84, against Pilgrims at the Greyhound, "contrary to general expectations", by the odd goal in five, thanks to a late winner from J. H. Cornford. In the second round it lost 3–1 at Romford, two of the home side's goals being scored by A. D. Cornell, who had swapped out from goalkeeper to assist the forwards.

The club played in the first two editions of the London Senior Cup in 1882–83 and 1883–84, reaching the quarter-final in the latter season, at which stage it lost 6–0 to eventual runner-up Old Foresters at Snaresbrook. Before the 1884–85 season, the club merged with the Lennox A.F.C., which was also playing at the Greyhound, to form a new club, Dulwich F.C.

== Colours ==
The club's colours under the name Albert were violet and black. As Mosquitoes their colours were originally black shirts with MFC on the breast, white knickerbockers, and black stockings. By 1881 the club had changed to dark blue and white.

== Grounds ==
The club originally played on Clapham Common, using the Prince of Wales public house as its changing rooms. By 1880 the club had moved to the Brixton Cricket Club Ground near Loughborough Junction, and in 1881 to Dulwich, using the Greyhound pub, which had previously been used by the Grey Friars club, for its facilities.
