= Acton F.C. =

English Football club

Acton
- Full name: Acton Football Club
- Founded: 1873
- Dissolved: 1889?
- Ground: Gunnersbury Lane
Home colours

Acton was an English association football club, founded in 1873 under the name St Stephens (Westminster). In 1879 the club changed its name to Acton F.C. and moved to a ground in Acton.

== History ==
Although the club was founded as a Westminster club, it originally played at Battersea Park. Its membership was limited to 30.

The club first entered the FA Cup in 1877–78, losing in the first round to Remnants. It next entered two years later, by which time the club had changed its name to Acton. The club then entered every year until 1885–86. However the club only won two ties; a first round tie against Kildare in 1880–81, after a replay, and against Finchley in 1881–82, again after a replay. The club's last tie was a home defeat to Old Carthusians in November 1886, by a score given as 6–1 or 7–1.

The club was a founder member of the London Football Association in 1882. It claimed to have played 44 matches in the 1884–85 season, winning 13, drawing 12, and losing 19, which would have made it one of the most active clubs in London. Within two years however the club was in abeyance.

The club revived in 1888–89, with a new secretary and colours, but playing at the same ground. The revival seems to have lasted only one season. By 1894, the club's ground had been taken over by amateur club Ealing Association.

== Colours ==
The club's colours were scarlet and dark blue hooped shirts, with white shorts, and either scarlet (as St Stephen's) or blue (as Acton) stockings. In 1888 the club adopted chocolate and blue, probably in halves.

== Ground ==
As St Stephen's, the club played at Battersea Park. Its Acton ground was near the Mill Hill Tavern in Gunnersbury Lane.
