= John Dennis =

John Dennis may refer to:

== Law and politics ==
- John Dennis (1771–1806), American politician in Maryland
- John Dennis (1807–1859), American politician in Maryland
- John William Dennis (1865–1949), British politician, MP for Birmingham Deritend
- John Dennis (Missouri politician) (1917–2000), American politician in Missouri
- John N. Dennis (born 1933), American politician in New Jersey
- John Dennis (mayor), American politician in Indiana

== Others ==
- John Dennis (dramatist) (1658–1734), English dramatist
- John Stoughton Dennis (1820–1885), Canadian surveyor
- John B. Dennis (1835–1894), American military general
- Jack Dennis (cricketer) (John Newman Dennis, 1913–2006), English cricketer
- John Dennis (ornithologist) (c. 1916–2002), American ornithologist
- John Dennis (bishop) (1931–2020), English Anglican bishop
- John E. Dennis (born 1939), American mathematician
- John Dennis (talk show host) (born c. 1952), American radio talk show host
- John Dennis (diplomat) (born 1959), British diplomat and ambassador

== See also ==
- Jack Dennis (born 1931), American electrical engineer and computer scientist
- Jackie Dennis (1942–2020), Scottish singer
- John Dennys (died 1609), English poet and fisherman
