= Forest School, Walthamstow =

Independent school in Greater London

Forest School

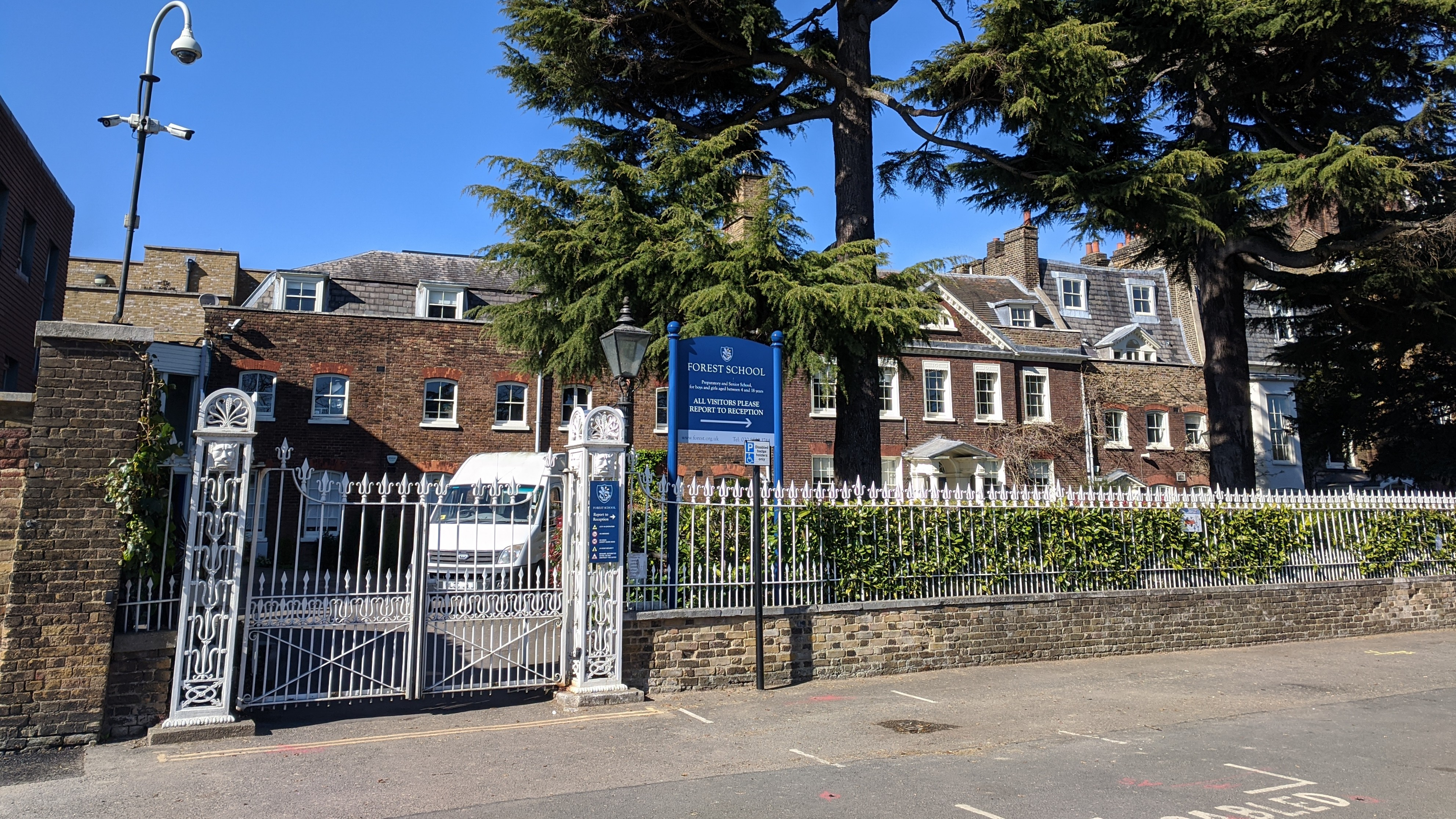
- The main buildings of Forest School

Location
- Walthamstow, Greater London, E17 3PY; England; 51°35′10″N 0°00′33″E

Information
- Type: Independent day school
- Motto: In Pectore Robur (Heart of oak or Strength in the Heart)
- Religious affiliation: Anglican
- Established: 1834; 192 years ago
- Founder: William Taylor Copeland
- Warden: Claire Tao
- Gender: Co-educational
- Age: 4 to 18
- Enrolment: 1,450 (approx.)
- Houses: 14
- Colours: Royal Blue & White Dark Blue & Gold (Year 11–13)
- Alumni: Old Foresters
- Boys Houses: Bishops Copelands Doctors Guys Johnians Millers Pooles
- Girls Houses: Astell Baylis Eliot Franklin Hepworth Kingsley School
- Website: www.forest.org.uk

Forest School is a private day school in Walthamstow in the London Borough of Waltham Forest. The school occupies a large campus around its original Grade II listed Georgian and Victorian terraced buildings. The school has more than 1,430 pupils, aged 4 to 18, split equally between boys and girls.

== History ==
=== Foundation and the first two decades ===
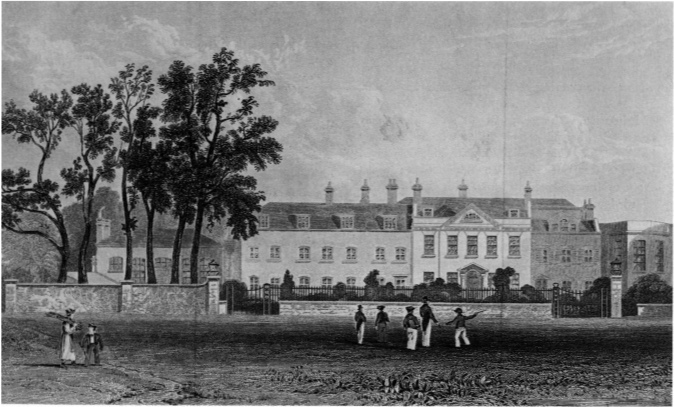
Exeter College c. 1830

The earliest buildings at the front of the school date from the eighteenth century, when the site consisted of brick kilns and adjoining cottages owned by Thomas Skingle, a brick maker. In 1830 Exeter College was established there by William Oram, however it was unsuccessful and by 1833 had closed down. However, this did not deter the owner, Archibald du Boulay, and following a meeting at his house on 17 February 1834 it was decided to try again, and thus the idea of Forest Proprietary Grammar School was launched. The owners of the new school were mainly local dignitaries, their president was William Taylor Copeland, and they recruited Rev. Thomas Dry as the first headmaster. The school opened on 1 October 1834 with 22 pupils.

Walthamstow had a rural setting before the railway opened in 1870, but the school's location on the Snaresbrook Road and Woodford New Road coaching routes to London gave it good links to the city. The school prospered in its first few years and before the end of the decade had 80 pupils, the majority being boarders. The School Library opened in 1836, making it the longest surviving Forest institution.

The 1840s were a difficult decade for the school, with pupil numbers falling and rising costs. It is not clear exactly what caused this, but there were complaints of brutality and neglect, and it was decided to close the school in 1844. However the new headmaster Mr J. F. Boyes was determined it should be saved, and he was able to stave off the school's closure during his time in charge (1844–1848). By the time Mr Boyes came into a fortune in 1848 and therefore moved on from Forest, it is clear his efforts had stabilised the school's position. In 1848, Forest's third headmaster was John Gilderdale, who put the school firmly on its feet and laid the foundations for it to be one of the most successful nineteenth-century schools. It was during Gilderdale's time in charge that "In Pectore Robur" became the school's motto. In June 1857 the School Chapel was opened, a fitting way to end his reign at the school.

=== Frederick Barlow Guy and the school's Victorian expansion ===
It was in the summer of 1857 that Frederick Barlow Guy took over from his father-in-law as Forest's headmaster, beginning a period of almost 80 years when a Guy would be in charge of the school. Frederick Guy, who earlier had been Bradfield College's first headmaster, was Forest headmaster from 1857 to 1886.

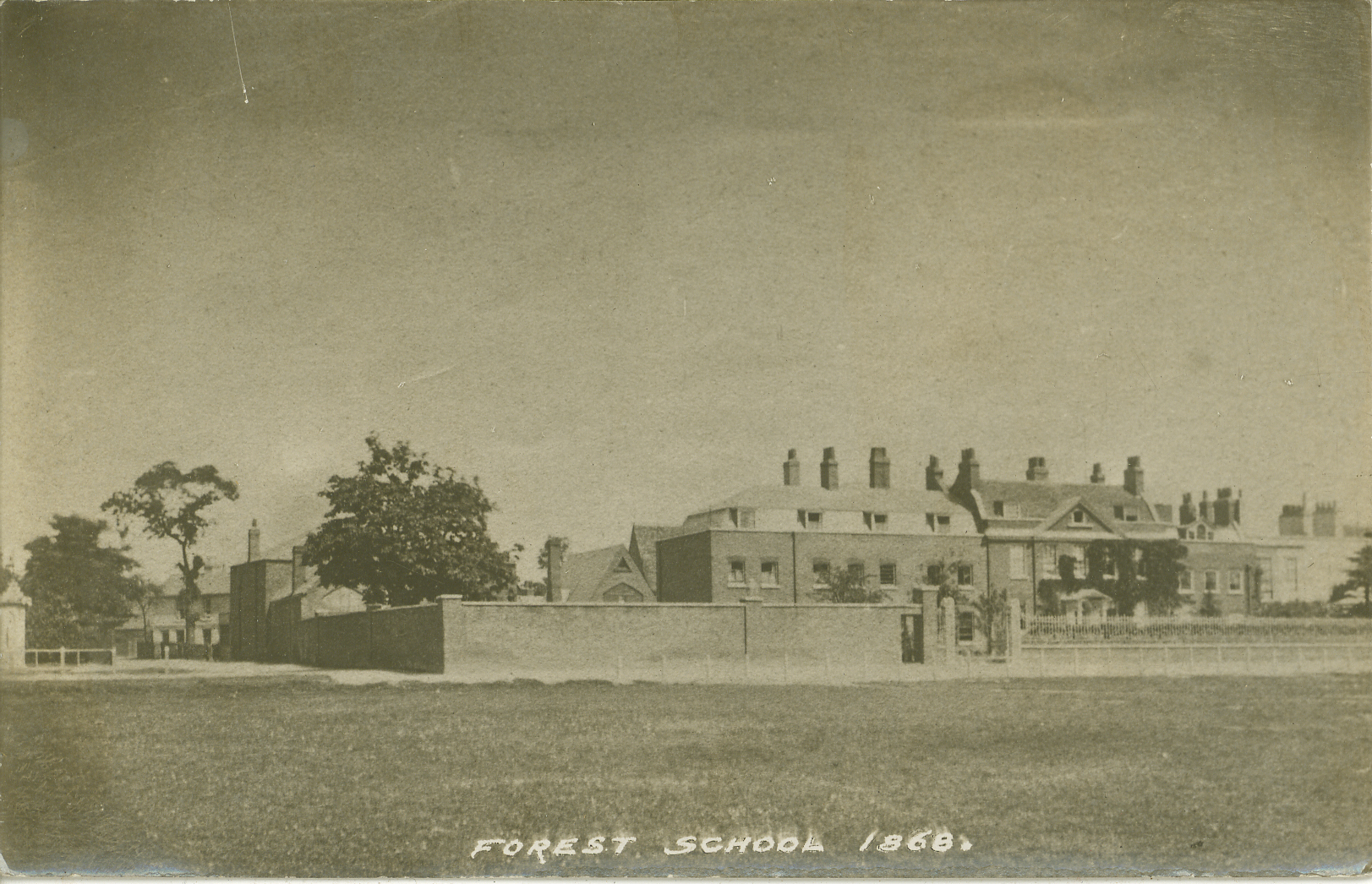
Forest School c. 1858

The school grew in size to about 100 pupils, and several major building projects were completed which vastly developed and expanded the school's facilities. In 1859 the Sick Cottage (later the Senior Common Room) was built, followed by the first swimming pool in 1865 (it was replaced in 1877), the gymnasium in 1872, the enlarged chapel in 1875 and the Fives Court in 1879. The largest building project was opened at the end of Guy's reign in 1886, when the grand Dining Hall was opened.

Academically the school also expanded; in 1860 the first Shakespeare Play, in 1865 the first edition of the School Magazine, and in 1883 the Cadets was formed. William Morris, a former private pupil of Frederick Guy, presented a banner to the school in 1879, still held in the dining hall. In 1886, Frederick's son Thomas Edward Barlow "Ned" Guy took over as headmaster until in 1894 he left to be the parish priest at Fulford, in Yorkshire.

=== Forest's influence on association football ===
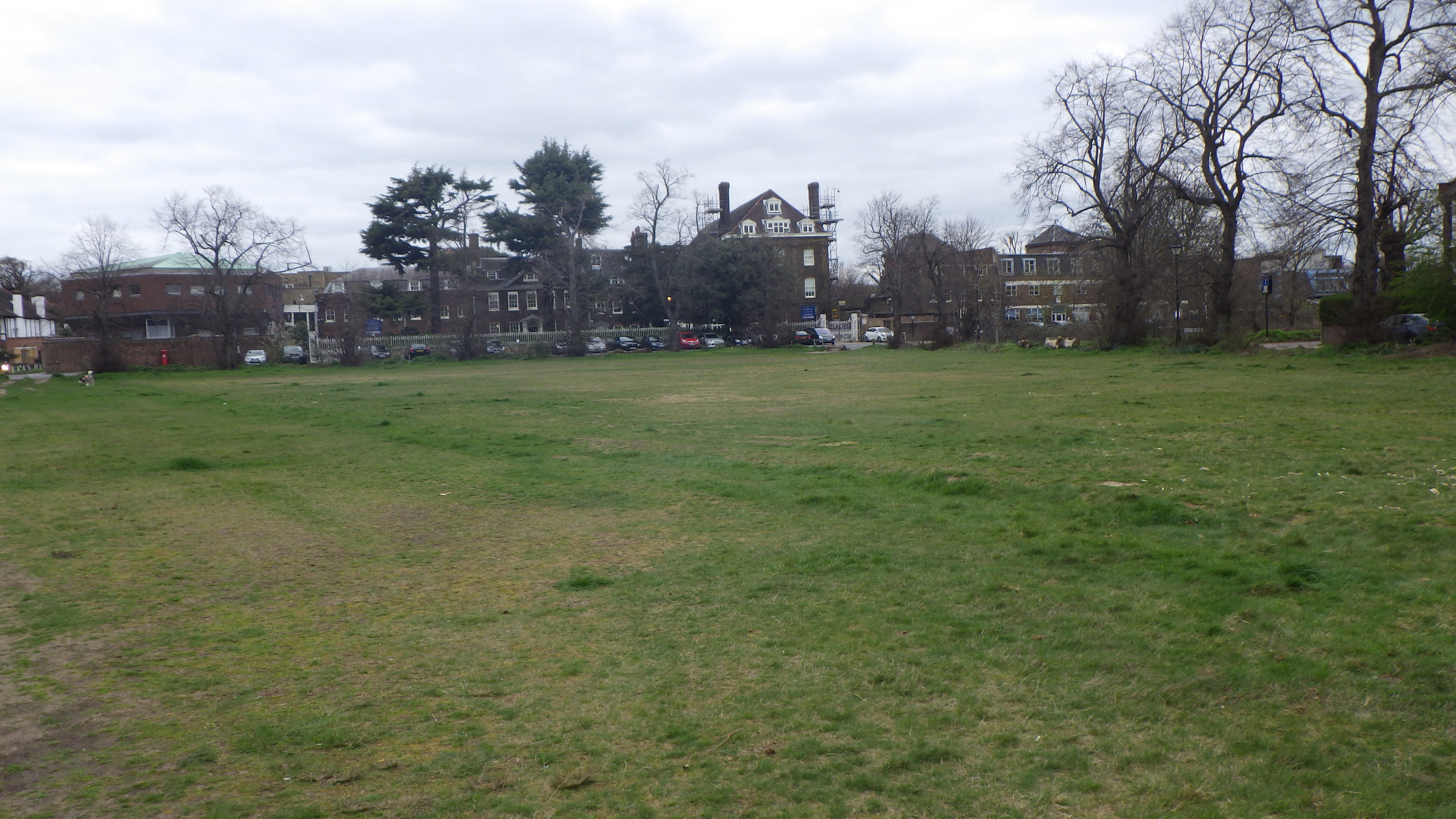
The common at the front of the school was the site for all early Forest cricket and football matches.

Forest had an important role in the development and creation of association football, and the common at the front of the school may well be regarded as a "cradle of the game". In the school's early years there was no sport apart from informal kick-about by the pupils, but by the 1840s cricket was played and hockey was in vogue in the early 1850s. Football began at Forest in 1857 when Frederick Guy took over as headmaster; it was played on the common, at the front of the school. The common was a rather uneven playing surface, with the great chestnut trees at the side of the pitch "in play" and some famous iron railings marking the north end of the pitch. Tradition records some great battles between Charles W. Alcock and F.J. Poole, in which the object was to barge the other player over the iron railings! The earliest reported match against another school was in Forest's first season on 24 February 1858, when Forest beat Chigwell School 5–4 on the common. Another early game was on Saturday 16 November 1861, when Forest School, (playing as "Walthamstow"), lost to a Westminster School side (playing as "Bounding Bricks") by three goals to nil. A return match was played four weeks later, and in 1862 the school played against Old Westminsters (playing as Elizabethan Club).

By 1863, Forest football had a major influence on the development of the game, and it was involved in the formation of the Football Association and also the leading club at the time, The Forest Club. Forest School joined the F.A. for its fifth meeting, on 1 December 1863, when John Bouch (brother of a pupil) and David John Morgan (recent Old Forester) represented the school on a 15-man committee. It was at this fifth F.A. meeting that the important amendment was made to the rules that running with the ball and hacking would be removed, and Forest, with only limited running with the ball in their rules, are likely to have been influential in voting for this change. Forest School is the second oldest continuous member of the F.A., behind only the Civil Service. Walter Cutbill, an Old Forester, served as an early member of the F.A. Committee and Henry Tubb, captain of Forest in 1867, helped the F.A. committee evolve its rules in that year.

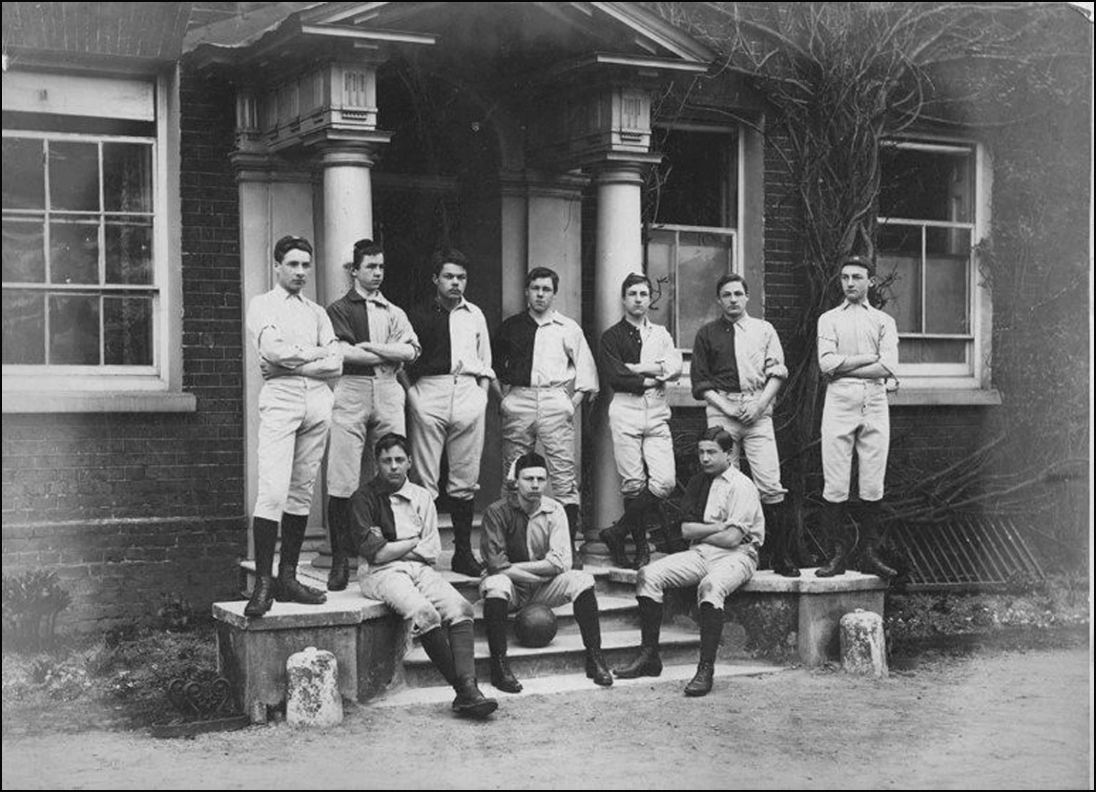
Forest football team 1884.

Although a member of the F.A. from almost the very beginning, the school's own rules, "The Forest Rules", were still played up until 1867, with 15 players a side. The Wanderers described the Forest Rules as "a happy mixture of Rugby, Harrow and Charterhouse rules". It was essentially a dribbling game, and "shinning, hacking and tripping" was not allowed. From the 1867–68 season Forest decided to play all its home matches under the rules of the Football Association, although away games could still be played under the local rules of the host club. 15 players per side could still be played up until 1869.

Forest is the only school to have played in the F.A. Cup, which it did for four seasons 1875–1879. The Old Foresters F.C., founded in 1876, entered the F.A.Cup in 12 seasons (1877–1889), and reached the quarter-finals in 1882, losing 0–1 to Great Marlow at Slough in a replay after a 0–0 draw in the first meeting at The Oval. The 1887 campaign ended after a 0–3 defeat to Preston North End at Leyton, in front of 5,000 spectators. Preston North End won the first-ever Football League championship two years later. Other F.A.Cup games were played against future Football League clubs Middlesbrough, Grimsby Town and Watford Rovers (later to become Watford F.C.). Old Foresters Percy Fairclough and Fred Pelly played for England.

=== Ralph Courtenay Guy ===
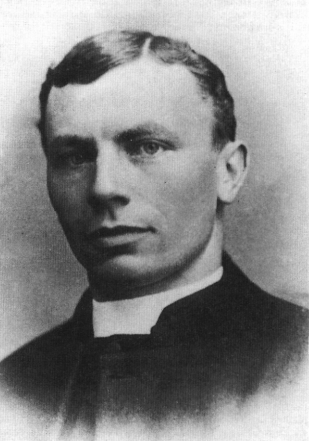
R.C. Guy.

In 1894 Ralph Guy took over from his brother as headmaster, continuing the Guy legacy and starting 41 years at the helm. Ralph Guy had been a pupil at Forest himself. He was a first-class sportsman and he continued the strong sporting culture at the school; one of the first things he did was set up the annual "Sylvestrians" Cricket Week. Edward L. Atkinson was taught at Forest in the 1890s, who went on to be the surgeon on Scott's last, fatal Antarctic Expedition, but had the good fortune to survive himself. The school's pupil numbers and facilities continued to grow: a new Sanatorium in 1902, an extended Junior School, a new Grub Shop and in 1906 the School's Science Laboratory was built at the south end of College Place on the site of the modern Theatre.

The Great War of 1914–1918 affected Forest greatly as it did for the nation as a whole. There were many reports of the suffering and the heroism which Old Foresters endured during the conflict, and Lieutenant Geary's Victoria Cross and a number of Military Crosses bear testimony to the Old Foresters in battle. The School Magazine reported first-hand accounts of a Zeppelin raid taking place over London, and another occasion of the destruction of an airship by fire. 98 Old Foresters were killed in the Great War, their names are recorded on the south wall of the chapel. The 1920s saw the formation of the House System: Doctor's after Dr. F. B. Guy, Poole's after Prebendary F. J. Poole, and Johnians after John Gilderdale. Soon after the school celebrated its centenary, Ralph Courtenay Guy sold the school in 1935, and the Guy dynasty of almost 80 years was ended.

=== Gerald Miller and post-war growth ===
In 1936 Gerald Miller became Forest's seventh Headmaster after buying the school from R.C. Guy. Three years later the onset of the Second World War brought significant disruption to Forest, which still operated throughout the war. The most significant event was in August 1944 when a flying-bomb scored a direct hit on the Junior School, which it destroyed along with the cricket pavilion, Grub Shop and Manor cottage. 40 Old Foresters and one school servant lost their lives in the war. In April 1947 Gerald Miller transferred ownership of the school to a newly formed charitable Association, and Forest school moved from being a privately owned school to a public school, with about 300 pupils at this time.

Post-war the school underwent a decade of transformation and expansion. The park was levelled and expanded in 1947, providing an expanse of modern sporting pitches. The Manor cottage, Grub Shop and cricket pavilion were rebuilt and the Junior School was rebuilt in 1950. The new Aston Block was opened in 1953, providing a large, modern classroom block for the expanding pupil numbers, and the new science complex was opened in 1957. Copelands was created as the fifth house to reflect growing pupil numbers; by 1959 there were about 450 pupils including 139 boarders. Gerald Miller retired in 1960.

=== Denis Foxall introduces Gloucesters and girls ===
Denis Foxall was Forest's headmaster, later titled warden, from 1960 to 1983. During his period in charge the school diversified and several building projects took place. The largest early project was a new 400-seat theatre, opened by Princess Margaret who flew in by helicopter in 1967. The theatre was later renamed the Deaton Theatre after former master Guy Deaton.

In 1970 the Gloucester Building was opened, for the lower prep school of ages 7–11. It was named after and opened by Old Forester Basil Tudor Guy, Bishop of Gloucester who was grandson of F.B. Guy. In 1974 the Old Foresters Football Club won the Arthur Dunn Cup for the first time. Further school developments continued at the end of the decade with the new sports hall and music school opening in 1979.

In 1981 the school expanded to include girls when the girls' school was opened by Katharine, Duchess of Kent. Forest School now had 1,100 pupils in total.

== Notable alumni ==
- Academia
  - Bernard Ashmole, archaeologist and art historian
  - Malcolm Brenner, founding director of the Center for Cell and Gene Therapy
  - Richard J. Evans, historian, Regius Professor of Modern History, University of Cambridge and fellow of Gonville and Caius College, Cambridge
  - Richard Holmes, soldier and historian; Brigadier, British Army (TA); aide-de-camp to Her Majesty Queen Elizabeth II; Professor of Military and Security Studies, Cranford University
  - Alan Howard Ward, physicist
  - Eric Wolf, Marxist anthropologist
- Arts and media
  - Eshaan Akbar, comedian
  - David Byron né Garrick, lead singer of early Heavy Metal Progressive Rock band, Uriah Heep
  - Finlay Christie, comedian
  - David Cracknell, former political editor of The Sunday Times and PR executive
  - George Dangerfield, journalist, Pulitzer Prize winning historian and literary editor of Vanity Fair
  - Paapa Essiedu, actor
  - Nickolas Grace, actor
  - Peter Greenaway, director and Professor of Cinema Studies at the European Graduate School
  - Tolga Kashif, musician and composer
  - Jack May, actor including voice of Nelson Gabriel in The Archers
  - William Mervyn, actor in films and TV series including All Gas and Gaiters
  - Corey Mylchreest, actor (My Oxford Year)
  - Ella Purnell, actor
  - Sharat Sardana, co-writer and star of Goodness Gracious Me
  - Graham Sutton, post-rock musician and founder of Bark Psychosis
  - Nicola Walker, actress ('Ruth Evershed' in Spooks)
  - Adam Woodyatt, actor ('Ian Beale' in EastEnders)
- Political, civil and diplomatic service
  - Kweku Etrew Amua-Sekyi, former Justice of the Supreme Court of Ghana
  - Sir Stephen Gomersall KCMG, former ambassador to Japan (1994–2004), Chief Executive of Hitachi Europe
  - Sir Brandon Lewis MP, former Conservative Party Member of Parliament for Great Yarmouth
  - Gagan Mohindra MP, Conservative Party Member of Parliament for South West Hertfordshire
  - Ersin Tatar, President of the Turkish Republic of Northern Cyprus
  - Giles Watling MP, actor and Conservative Party Member of Parliament for Clacton
- Military and exploration

Sledge flag used by Edward L. Atkinson during the Terra Nova Expedition in Antarctica, bearing the school's motto. Now on display in the school's Dining Hall.

  - Edward L. Atkinson, Royal Naval surgeon and Antarctic explorer
  - George W. Hayward, 19th century explorer
  - Geoffrey Wellum, Battle of Britain fighter pilot and author
- Sport
  - Josh Acheampong, football player for Chelsea FC
  - Ruth Buscombe, Head of Strategy, Alfa Romeo Racing Formula One Team
  - Jack Dennis, cricketer who played for Essex
  - James Foster, Essex and England cricket team wicketkeeper
  - Nasser Hussain, Former captain of England cricket team (1999–2003); currently Sky Sports commentator
  - Henry Ochieng, footballer for Leyton Orient
  - Mark Petchey, former international tennis player and coach to Andy Murray; currently Sky Sports commentator
  - Max Raison, cricketer who played for Essex
  - Charlie Sheringham, ex-professional footballer
  - Jayden Sweeney, football player of Grimsby Town FC
  - Hubert Waugh, cricketer who played for Essex and Suffolk
- Other
  - Ahmed Omar Saeed Sheikh, Islamic militant
