= Hugh Stanbrough =

English cricketer and footballer

Maurice Stanbrough
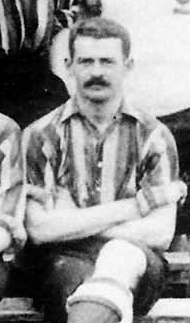
- Stanborough while with Old Carthusians in 1903

Personal information
- Full name: Maurice Hugh Stanbrough
- Date of birth: 2 September 1870
- Place of birth: Cleobury North, England
- Date of death: 15 December 1904 (aged 34)
- Place of death: Broadstairs, England
- Position: Outside right

Senior career*
Years	Team	Apps	(Gls)
1890–1892	Cambridge University		
- Old Carthusians
- Corinthian
1894–1895	Casuals		
1895–1898	Eastbourne		
- Old Salopians

International career
1895	England	1	(0)
- * Club domestic league appearances and goals

Maurice Hugh Stanbrough (2 September 1870 – 15 December 1904) was an English footballer and cricketer.

Hugh Stanbrough was educated at Charterhouse School and Caius College, Cambridge. He played football for Cambridge University from 1890 to 1892, when he graduated and became a schoolmaster. He played football for a number of clubs and earned one cap for the England national team, a 1–1 draw against Wales on 18 March 1895.

He also played for Eastbourne from 1895 until his last game on 16 April 1898 against Marlow.

== Honours ==
Old Carthusians

- FA Amateur Cup: 1893–94
- London Senior Cup: 1894–95
- London Charity Cup: 1895–96
- Arthur Dunn Challenge Cup: 1902–03
