= Old Foresters F.C. =

Association football club in England

Coordinates: 51°35′16″N 0°00′49″E

Old Foresters
- Full name: Old Foresters Football Club
- Founded: 1876
- Ground: Oakfield Playing Fields, Fairlop
- League: Arthurian League
Home colours

The Old Foresters Football Club is an association football club made up exclusively of former pupils of Forest School, located in Epping Forest, Walthamstow, London, England.

The Old Foresters Football Club is probably one of the half dozen or so oldest football clubs in the world. It has a continuous and proud history going back before its own formal constitution in 1876 and the founding of The Football Association in 1863. Forest played a considerable part in the development of association football and Rugby Football, and "The Common" in front of the school may well be regarded as a cradle of the game.

Forest School F.C. is the second oldest continuous member of the F.A. (since December 1863), behind only the Civil Service, and it is the only school to have played in the FA Cup (Donington School entered the first F.A. Cup but never actually played a game). The Old Foresters Football Club's main on-field achievements are reaching the quarter-final of the F.A. Cup in 1882, and the last sixteen a further three times. The Old Foresters have won the prestigious "old boys cup", The Arthur Dunn Cup three times, the Essex Cup three times and the London Senior Cup twice. Two Old Foresters F.C. players have played for England while at the club: Percy Fairclough and Fred Pelly. Old Forester Robin Trimby played for England Amateur Team in the late 1950s and co-wrote several books on football skills including one co-written with Jimmy Hill. Old Forester Quinton Fortune appeared in the first Boodle & Dunthorne ISFA Cup Final in 1993, whilst a schoolboy player with Tottenham. Quinton later went on to play for Real Mallorca, Atletico Madrid, Manchester United and Bolton Wanderers, as well as for South Africa, for whom he appeared in both the 1998 and 2002 World Cup Finals.

The club has played in the Arthurian League since its foundation in 1961. Home matches are played at Oakfield Playing Fields, Fairlop.

== Club history ==
=== Early football at Forest School ===
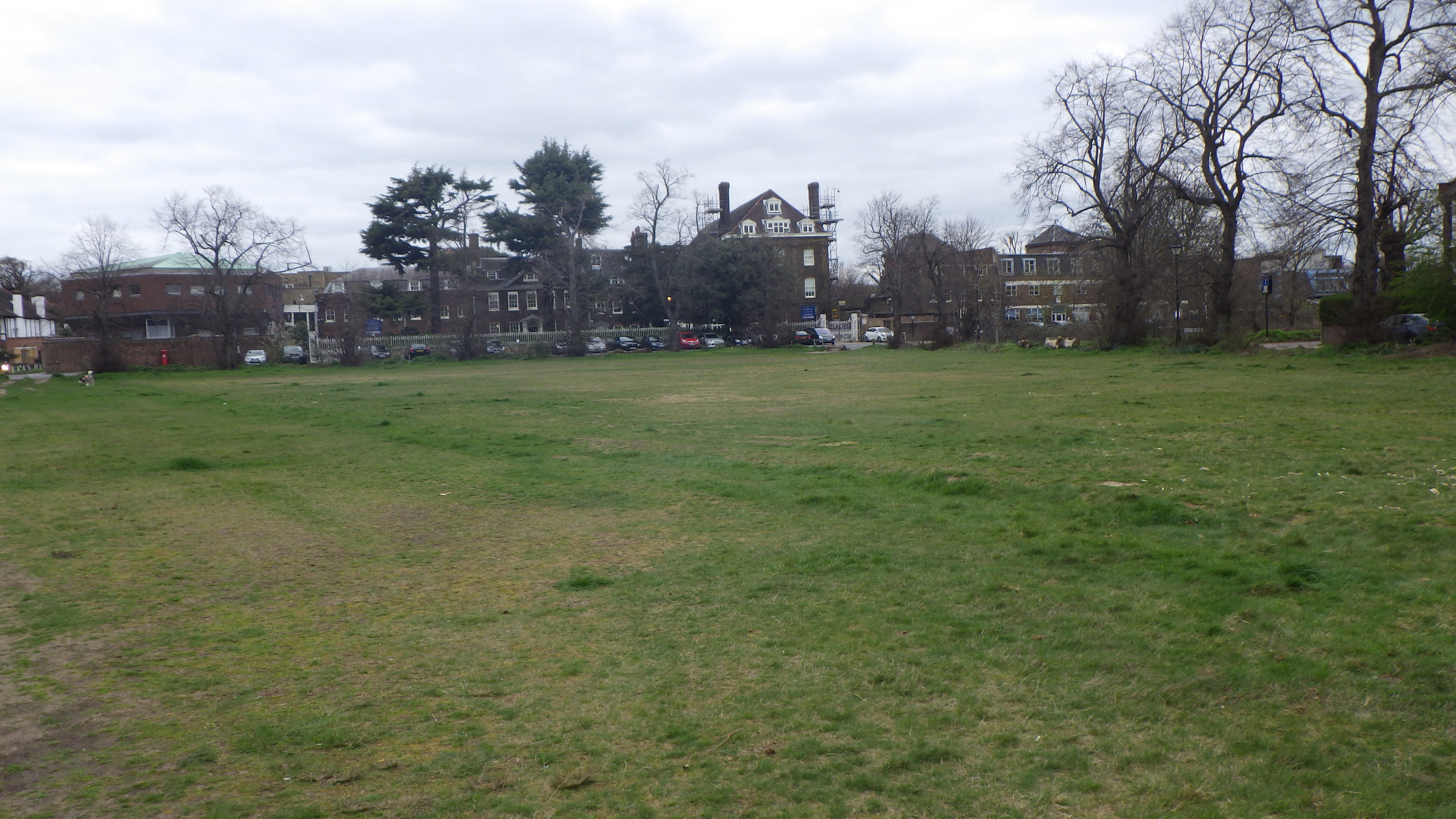
The Common at the front of the school where all early Forest Football was played.

Forest School was founded in 1834 and for the first decade or so there was no organised sport, football was only played in informal kick-abouts organised by the pupils. In John Gildersleeve's reign as headmaster (1848–1857) the school participated in cricket and hockey but there was no football at this time. It was on the appointment of Frederick Barlow Guy as headmaster in 1857, that football became quickly established and joined cricket as the dominant sport at the school. Football was played on The Common, at the front of the school. It was a rather uneven playing surface, with the great chestnut trees at the side of the pitch "in play" and some famous iron railings marking the north end of the pitch. Tradition records some great battles between Charles W. Alcock and F.J. Poole, in which the object was to barge the other player over the iron railings! The earliest reported match against another school was in Forest's first season on 24 February 1858, when Forest beat Chigwell School 5–4 on The Common. Another early game was on Saturday 16 November 1861, when Forest School, (playing as "Walthamstow"), lost to a Westminster School side (playing as "Bounding Bricks") by three goals to nil. A return match was played four weeks later, and in 1862 the school played against Old Westminsters (playing as Elizabethan Club).

By 1863, Forest football had a major influence on the development of the game, and it was involved in the formation of the Football Association and also the leading club at the time, The Forest Club. Forest School joined the F.A. for its fifth meeting, on 1 December 1863, when John Bouch (brother of a pupil) and David John Morgan (recent Old Forester) represented the school on a 15-man committee. It was at this fifth F.A. meeting that the important amendment was made to the rules that running with the ball and hacking would be removed, and Forest, with only limited running with the ball in their rules, are likely to have been influential in voting for this change. Walter Cutbill, an Old Forester, served as an early member of the F.A. Committee and Henry Tubb, captain of Forest in 1867, helped the F.A. committee evolve its rules in that year.

=== The Forest Rules ===
Although a member of the F.A. from almost the very beginning, the school's own rules, "The Forest Rules", were still played up until 1867, with 15 players a side. The Wanderers described the Forest Rules as "a happy mixture of Rugby, Harrow and Charterhouse rules". It was essentially a dribbling game, and "shinning, hacking and tripping" was not allowed.

The Forest Rules, as played in 1866, were as follows:

1. That the goal posts be six yards apart.
2. That a base extend for thirty yards in front of goal, and that no person or player may enter this base except while following the ball, and when the ball is kicked out again, all players of the opposite side must go out of the base before again touching the ball.
3. There shall be no shinning, hacking or tripping.
4. That on catching the ball from a kick by one of the opposition side, before touching the ground, the person who has caught it may run with it.
5. If it goes beyond the boundary, it must be thrown in again by the person who touches it first.
6. If the ball is kicked behind the goal without going through the posts or over, it can be kicked off by the side to whom the goal belongs.
7. That there be no free kicks allowed.
8. That the ball when started must be kicked off the ground 30 yds. from the goal.

From the 1867–68 season, Forest decided to play all its home matches under the rules of the Football Association, although away games could still be played under the local rules of the host club. 15 players per side could still be played up until 1869.

The first recorded annual fixture between the Old Foresters and the school was in the 1864–65 season, although it is likely to have been played for several years before. Forest School entered the F.A. Cup of 1875–76, and lost 6–0 to Oxford University in the first round. This was the only defeat for the school all season however, conceding only two goals in the other fourteen games. The school continued to enter the F.A. Cup until the 1878–79 season, and thus became the only school ever to compete in the famous competition.

=== Links with The Forest Club ===
The Forest Club was founded by Old Harrovian Charles W. Alcock in 1859, primarily for Old Harrovians to continue to play football, but also for other local members. The club played on Epping Forest, probably between the Infant Orphan Asylum (now Snaresbrook Crown Court) and Forest Place (now Whipps Cross Road), less than a mile south of Forest School, and several Old Foresters are known to have played for the Forest Club, including five Cutbill brothers, G. H. Edmunds, D.J. Morgan and J. Robertson. The Forest Club became The Wanderers Club in 1864, and went on to win the F.A. Cup five times.

=== 1876 - 1894: The golden era ===
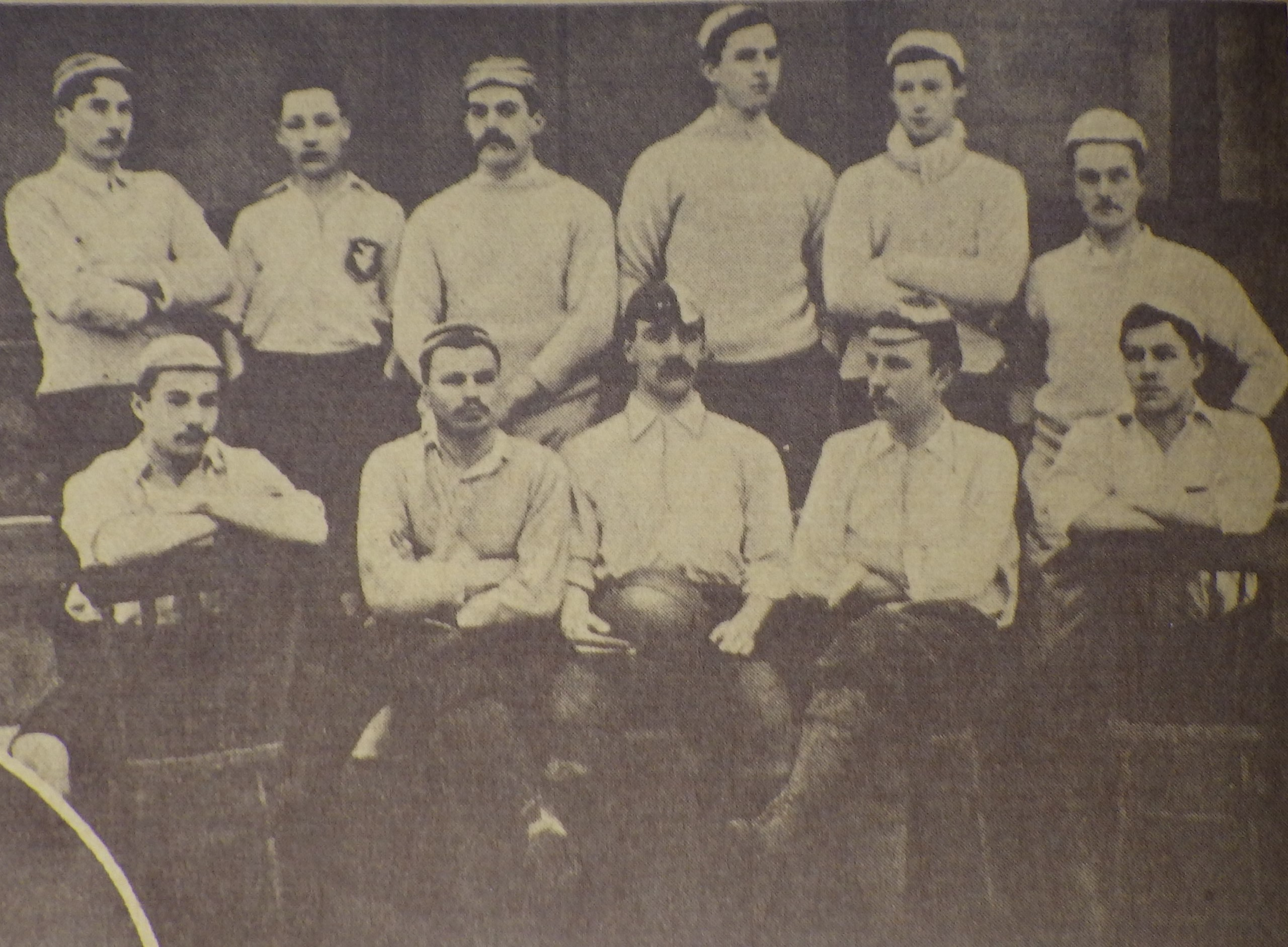
Old Foresters F.C. team 1885

The Old Foresters Football Club was officially founded in 1876, although as has been mentioned, played regularly against the school and possibly other clubs for many years before. Eleven games were played that first year, with seven being won. From 1877 a second eleven was fielded. Early Old Forester sides were very strong, and the club entered the F.A. Cup for twelve consecutive seasons from 1877-78 until 1888–89.

In 1882, the Old Foresters reached the quarter-final of the F.A. Cup, losing 0–1 to Great Marlow at Slough in a replay after a 0–0 draw in the first meeting at The Oval. The last sixteen of the F.A. Cup was reached in 1884, 1887 and 1888. The 1887 campaign ended after a 0–3 defeat to Preston North End at Leyton, in front of 5,000 spectators. Preston North End won the first ever Football League championship two years later. The 1888 campaign included a 4–2 victory over Grimsby Town. The next round was against Middlesbrough. The Old Foresters lost 0–4 at Middlesbrough, but complained that the pitch was unfit for play. A rematch was ordered, but the Foresters refused to travel to Middlesbrough to play on the same pitch, so Middlesbrough were awarded a walkover victory. The last F.A. Cup match for the Old Foresters was a 0–6 defeat to Watford Rovers (later to become Watford F.C.) in the 1888–89 season.

The Essex Senior Cup was won in 1885, 1886, and 1887, after which the Old Foresters withdrew from the competition "to give somebody else a chance". The London Senior Cup was won in 1885 so the Old Foresters withdrew the following season. The next time they entered the competition, in 1894, the cup was won again.

During this era, two Old Foresters players were selected to represent England — Percy Fairclough in 1878 and Fred Pelly, three times in 1893 and 1894.

=== The Arthur Dunn Cup ===
The Arthur Dunn Challenge Cup was founded in 1902 and is the premier "old boys" cup competition. The Old Foresters were one of the fourteen inaugural clubs to enter, and have competed ever since. The first half of the twentieth century was barren for Old Foresters football, and they reached the semi-final of the cup only once in 1908. After the Second World War, the school grew in numbers, and this meant there was a greater pool of talent for the Old Foresters to choose from. The semi final was reached again in 1958 and 1963 and in 1970 the final, only to lose 2–1 to Old Reptonians.

In 1974, the Old Foresters won the Arthur Dunn Cup for the first time, beating Old Brentwoods 2–1 after extra time at the Crystal Palace Sports Centre. The league and cup double was achieved that year.

Since 1970, the Foresters have consistently been one of the stronger Old Boys sides. The Arthur Dunn Cup was won again in 1997, 1998 and 2021 and the Arthurian Premier League was won in 1973, 1974, 1996, 1997, 1998, 2002, and 2018.

== Home Grounds ==
The Old Foresters played for many years at their home ground at The Park (Shrubbage), within Epping Forest just east of the school. The Park was acquired by Old Foresters in 1914 and given to the school in 1919, and both school and Old Boys shared its use. However, with the school's expansion there was no longer the capacity for the Old Foresters to continue playing at The Park and the first alternative ground was found at Edmonton in 1930. A variety of other grounds were used, until, in 1971, the Old Foresters purchased a new ground for their exclusive use at Station Hill, Abridge Road, Theydon Bois. By the 1970s, the club ran six weekly sides and a Vets team. The Theydon ground proved too expensive to run, and was sold off in 1988, the club since using the school pitches and Fairlop Oak Playing Fields, Fairlop.

The full list of previous home grounds is as follows:

- 1876 - 1930 The Park, Snaresbrook.
- 1930 - 1939 Henry Barrass Ground, Lower Edmonton.
- 1946 - 1947 The Park, Snaresbrook.
- 1947 - 1971 The Railway Arms, Theydon Bois.
- 1953 - 1957 Upper Clapton Rugby Club, Thornwood Common (1st team ground).
- 1957 - 1971 Loughton Cricket Club (1st team ground).
- 1971 - 1988 Station Hill, Abridge Road, Theydon Bois.
- 1988 - 2000 Fairlop Oak Playing Fields, Fairlop.
- 2000 - 2014 The Park, Snaresbrook.
- 2014 - 2023 Fairlop Oak Playing Fields, Fairlop.
- 2023 - Oakfield Playing Fields, Fairlop.

== Colours ==
The club's original colours were dark blue, with a crest added in 1877.

In 1884, the club changed to white shirts with a crest, which remained the colours until at least 1891. The club now plays in all dark blue.
