= National Reconciliation Commission =

The National Reconciliation Commission was established in January 2002 by the Parliament of Ghana. The goal of the commission was to establish an "accurate, complete and historical record of violations and abuses of human rights inflicted on persons by public institutions and holders of public office during periods of unconstitutional government." The Commission was formed after a new democratic party won the elections in 2000. The Commission covered human rights violations in Ghana from 1957 to 1993. It looked into government abuses and military coups staged by former president Jerry Rawlings. The members of the Commission worked until the end of 2004.

== History ==
There were two main parties in Ghana when the country, then known as Gold Coast, was seeking independence. These parties were: Convention People's Party (CPP) which was a socialist based party who was pro-independence and the National Liberation Movement (Ghana) (NLM) which was a capitalist-oriented party opposed to unitary system of government and the radical approach of the C.P.P. . The United Party (Ghana) was a branch of the NLM and they worked together. Kwame Nkrumah was the leader of the CPP, which won the general elections of 1951, 1954 and 1956. He became the first president of Ghana when it gained independence from the British Empire in 1957. In 1960, Ghana became a republic and four years later, it became a one-party state where the CPP was the only party. As part of the 1964 constitutional amendments Nkrumah declared Ghana a one party state. In response to opposed views of his political opponents, Nkrumah introduced the Preventative Detention Act (PDA) which gave the President the power to arrest those whose actions appeared to him as not being conducive to public peace and order. The PDA was used as a tool to victimize and unlawfully incarcerate popular members and leaders of the NLM such as Baffour Osei Akoto, Chief linguist to the Asantehene (see, RE AKOTO & 7 others Supreme Court case) and Dr. J.B. Danquah who was Nkrumah’s major political opponent at the time.

=== 1966 to 1981 ===
In 1966, Nkrumah's government was overthrown in a coup d'état while he was away in Vietnam. The coup d'état had massive support from the members of the NLM and UP governments. A general election was held in 1969 and was won by the Progress Party (Ghana), a branch of the NLM led by Kofi Abrefa Busia. The opposition was the National Alliance of Liberals.

In 1972, a bloodless military coup led by Ignatius Kutu Acheampong, while Busia was in the United Kingdom, overthrew Busia's government and he created the National Redemption Council (NRC), a military government. In 1975, the government changed from the NRC to the Supreme Military Council (Ghana) still led by Acheampong. In 1978, Acheampong was replaced by Fred Akuffo. Akuffo promised he would work towards a civilian rule within the next year.

In 1979, an attempted military coup brought Rawlings and his Armed Forces Revolutionary Council, Ghana to power. He launched his military coup two weeks before the national election. The election was held and Rawlings lost. The country was returned to the People's National Party (Ghana), a successor party carrying out Nkrumah's legacy with the same ideologies.

=== 1981 to 2000 ===
In 1981, Rawlings held a military coup to regain power. His government, the Provisional National Defence Council (PNDC) remained in power until 1992. Rawlings declared a 'holy war' aimed "at restructuring national political institutions, establishing genuine democracy based on Ghanaian ideals and traditions, and rehabilitating the economy." Rawlings banned all other political parties and suspended the constitution. In 1991, the PNDC set up a consultative assembly to draft a new constitution and to restore a new multiparty democracy. A year later, the new constitution was approved and political parties were unbanned. The PNDC changed into the National Democratic Congress (Ghana). After an election in 1992, observed by the Commonwealth of Nations, Rawlings was re-elected.

In 1996, Rawlings was re-elected once again. The opposition won enough seats to oppose constitutional changes which was a true step in the path of democracy. In 2000, Rawlings was not allowed to run in the election because of the two term limit in the constitution. His party lost to the New Patriotic Party (NPP) and John Kufuor became president. This was the first peaceful democratic transition in over forty years in Ghana.

== Commission ==
=== Establishment ===
In January 2002, the National Commission of Reconciliation began with the first government after Rawlings' reign. Nine commissioners were selected to carry out the commission. The commissioners consisted of six men and three women, all of whom were Ghanaian. It was chaired by former Chief Justice K. E. Amua-Sekyi. There were one hundred and fifteen staff members. The Commission set up six committees such as legal profession, professional bodies other than legal, the press and student movements, security services and religious bodies and chiefs. The objective of the commission was to establish an accurate representation of the human rights violations between three time periods over forty years during political unrest. The Commission received over three million dollars to produce it and 66% (two million) was coming directly from the Ghanaian government. The rest of money came from foreign governments and foundations through donations and grants. It was given a year to complete its work and findings but it was able to extend the length for another six months when the hearings concluded in July 2004. The Commission allowed investigation into when the country was in political unrest after independence (1966–69, 1972–1979, and 1981–1993) and the human violations that went with it.

=== Mandate ===
The mandate allowed the commissioners to address killings, abductions, disappearances, detention, torture and illegal seizure of property. The Commissioners were allowed to look into other human rights violations if they found that it would help achieve reconciliation. They were allowed to search premises without mandate and those who refused to give access were bought to court. They received over 4,200 statements from victims of human rights abuses. Similar to South Africa, they had public hearings which brought more attention to the Commission. The hearings began in January 2003 and aired on the television and the radio. The Commission heard over two thousand testimonies from victims and seventy-nine alleged perpetrators. In the final report, the Commissioners wrote that "it tried to apply a very broad and liberal definition to each of the categories and types of violations in its mandate, and drew on international human rights law, humanitarian law principles and common law understanding of the violations". For example, they could categorize "mock-execution" as torture.

=== Findings ===
The report concludes that the government during these years highly contributed to the "legacy of human rights abuse" and concluded that law enforcement institutions and the military were responsible for the majority of the abuses and human rights violations. The events of the military coup in 1979 was one of the conclusions towards their findings.

==== 1979 military coup ====
In 1979, Rawlings had been arrested for attempting a military coup against Acheampong. While in custody, he escaped with his soldiers and held an actual military coup. They executed six military officials who had previously served in the military including Lt. General Akwasi Afrifa, Rear Admiral Joy Amedume, Major General R.E.A Kotei, Colonel Roger Joseph Felli as well as two political leaders: Ignatius Kutu Acheampong and F.W.K Akuffo. They were executed on June 26, 1979. Three supreme court justices were killed during this coup as well. They imprisoned a dozen of high-ranked military official with sentences of up to fifteen years. There were over three hundred killings and abductions that happened during the coup. After this, Rawlings took over the government.

== Publishing ==
The Commission ended their discussions in October 2004, and their report was published in April of the following year. They were reluctant to share it with the public because it was very expensive to make the report public. It was made clear that the human rights violations in Ghana do not compare to the human rights violations in other African countries which could be a reason why the government did not want to publish the report.

=== Recommendations ===
The report outlined a comprehensive reparation program that included apologies, memorials and monetary compensation, the return of stolen property and the establishment of medical trauma facilities. The Commission recommended monetary reparations for approximately 3000 victims of human rights violations during Rawlings' rule. The recommended reparations varied between $120 and $3,500 depending on the type of reparation needed. Those who lost property had it returned, while health and education benefits were also given. The commission gave these small amounts in a way to encourage the government to give more in reparations. This tactic worked and they gave 1.5 million dollars in reparation. The reparations came directly from the recommendations of the commission. By June 2007, the financial reparations had been paid.

=== Criticism ===
The government was criticized for appearing weak while they were trying reconcile the country. The government's actions contradicted the Commission and its actions towards reconciliation. Chris Dadzie, director of public education at the Commission for Human Rights and Administrative Justice (CHRAJ), concludes that "more could have been done if the government had purposefully shown a gracious face … if government as government had purposely shown some graciousness, it would have negated some of the bitter expressions from other people.” There could have been more done with the commission and through the reparations There had been complaints about the reparations were not sufficient and the government has recognized that the amounts paid to the victims may have not been satisfactory. There were some institutional reforms that took place but police brutality has been on the rise in Ghana and the justice system cannot keep up. The Commission was criticized for allocating more importance to financial reparations than to restitution.
