= Percy Fairclough =

English footballer (1858–1947)

Personal information
- Date of birth: 1 February 1858
- Place of birth: London, England
- Date of death: 22 June 1947 (aged 89)
- Position: Forward

Senior career*
Years	Team	Apps	(Gls)
- Old Foresters
- Corinthian

International career
1878	England MNT	1	(0)
- * Club domestic league appearances and goals

Percy Fairclough (1 February 1858 – 22 June 1947) was an English amateur footballer who made one appearance for England in 1878.

== Football career ==
Fairclough was born in Mile End, east London and was educated at Forest School, Walthamstow, where he played for the school football team.

After leaving school, he joined the Old Foresters. In 1878, shortly after his twentieth birthday, he was selected by England for the match at Hampden Park, Glasgow against Scotland on 2 March. Although England "fielded a side they thought capable of defeating the Scots, ...(they) returned home with a humiliating 7-2 defeat", with three of the Scottish goals coming from John McDougall. Fairclough was described as a "powerful if somewhat ungainly forward".

He subsequently joined the Corinthian club, although he does not appear to have actually played for them.

== Life outside football ==
He was killed on 22 June 1947 in a road accident at the age of 89.
