= Malcolm Brenner =

British doctor

Malcolm K. Brenner is a British clinical scientist working mostly in the field of gene therapy and immunotherapy applied to malignancy. In 2016, Dr. Brenner was elected to the National Academy of Medicine, part of the National Academies of Sciences, Engineering, and Medicine.

He was educated at Forest School, Walthamstow and Emmanuel College, Cambridge England. He received his medical degree and subsequent Ph.D. from Cambridge University, England. In the 1980s, he was a Lecturer in Hematology at Royal Free Hospital in London. In 1990, he left the UK to work in St. Jude Children's Research Hospital in Memphis as the director of the Bone Marrow Transplant Division.

There, he conducted one of the first human gene therapy studies when he transduced bone marrow stem cells with a retroviral vector with the intention of marking them to study their survival and fate. This seminal study demonstrated that engrafted bone marrow stem cells contribute to long-term hematopoiesis and also that contaminating tumor cells in autografts can cause relapse. In 1994, he became the director of St. Jude's Cell and Gene Therapy Program.

The move in 1994 reflected his growing interest in the genetic-modification of T-cells for cancer therapy, cancer vaccines and monoclonal antibodies.

He was President of the International Society for Cellular Therapy and President of the American Society of Gene Therapy in 2002–2003. He was appointed Editor in Chief of the journal Molecular Therapy in 2009.

Dr. Brenner was appointed Director of the Center for Cell and Gene Therapy. Dr. Brenner's is a full-time faculty member for the Center for Cell and Gene Therapy, Texas Children's Cancer Center and the Dan L. Duncan Cancer Center at Baylor College of Medicine, Houston, Texas. In 2017, Dr. Brenner was awarded the European Society of Gene and Cell Therapy Outstanding Achievement Award, and in 2020 the Career Achievement Award in Cell & Gene Therapy from the International Society of Cell and Gene Therapy.
