= FA Amateur Cup =

Former association football competition in England

The FA Amateur Cup was an English football competition for amateur clubs. It commenced in 1893 and ended in 1974 when the Football Association abolished official amateur status.

== History ==
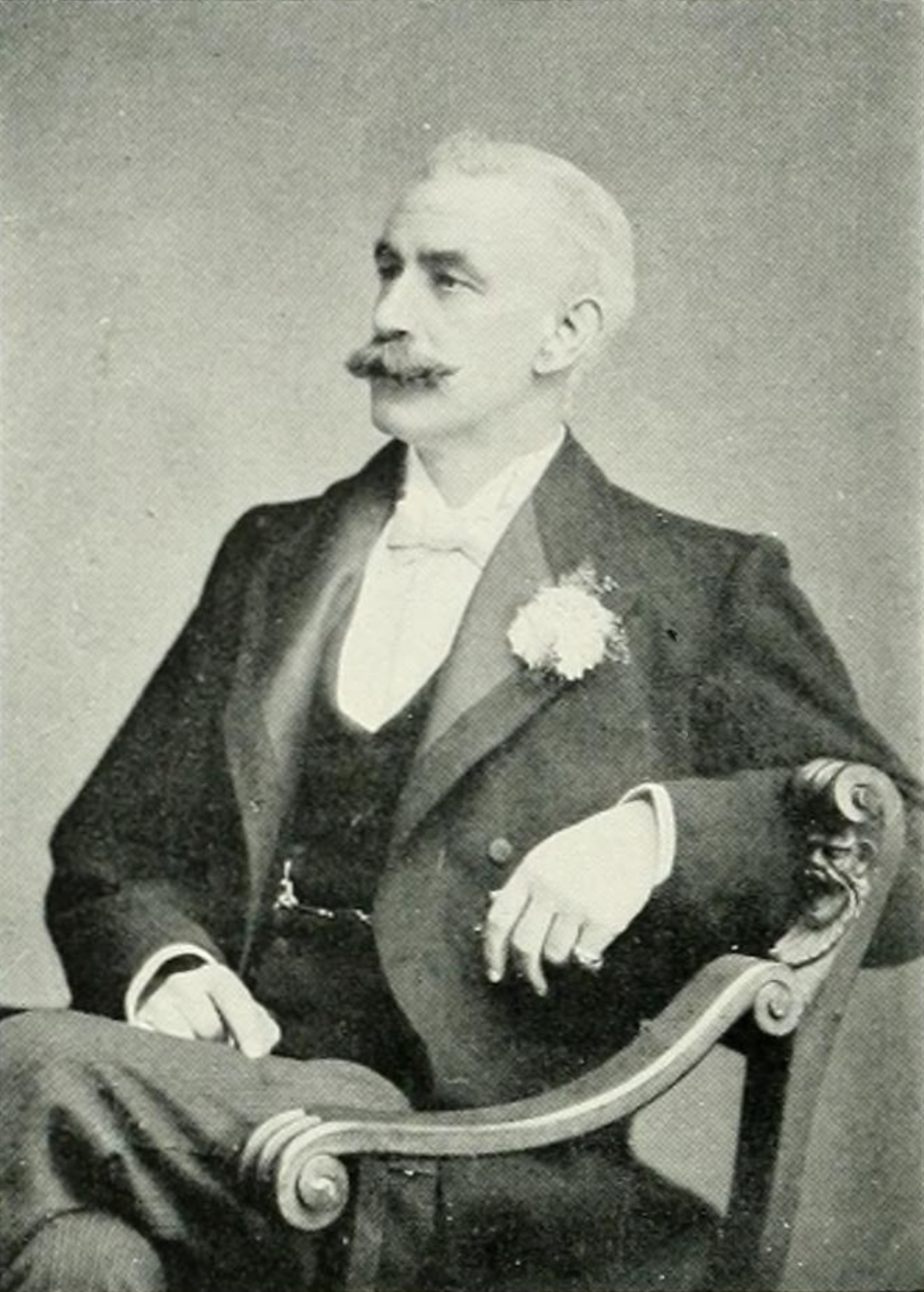
N.L. Jackson of Corinthian F.C. was a prime mover in the creation of the Amateur Cup.

Following the legalisation of professionalism within football, professional teams quickly came to dominate the sport's main national knock-out tournament, the FA Cup. In response to this, the committee of the country's oldest club, Sheffield F.C., suggested in 1892 the organisation of a separate national cup solely for amateur teams, and even offered to pay for the trophy itself. The Football Association (the FA) declined the club's offer, but a year later decided to organise just such a competition. N. L. Jackson of Corinthian F.C. was appointed chairman of the Amateur Cup sub-committee and arranged for the purchase of a trophy valued at £30, and the first tournament took place during the 1893–94 season. The entrants included 12 clubs representing the old boys of leading public schools, and Old Carthusians, the team for former pupils of Charterhouse School, won the first final, defeating Casuals. The old boy teams competed in the Amateur Cup until 1902, when disputes with the FA led to the formation of the Arthur Dunn Cup, a dedicated competition for such teams.

The 1973–74 competition was the last, as the FA abolished the distinction between professional and amateur clubs. The strongest amateur teams instead entered the FA Trophy, which had been set up five years earlier to cater for those teams outside The Football League which were professional rather than amateur. A new competition, the FA Vase, was set up to cater for the remaining amateur clubs, and was generally regarded as a direct replacement for the old competition.

== Structure ==
The first tournament attracted 81 entrants, with three qualifying rounds used to reduce the number down to 32 for the first round proper. For the following season, the previous season's semi-finalists joined at the first round proper along with other leading clubs chosen by the FA, with the numbers made up by teams progressing through the qualifying rounds. This remained the standard format until 1907, when the number of entrants to the first round was doubled to 64 and the number of rounds prior to the semi-finals increased to four. The competition continued under this format until it was discontinued in 1974.

== Venues ==
Wembley Stadium was the venue for the final between 1949 and 1974.

Matches in the Amateur Cup were played at the home ground of one of the two teams, as decided when the matches are drawn. Occasionally games were moved to other grounds. In the event of a draw, the replay was played at the ground of the team who originally played away from home. The second replay, and any further replays, were usually played at neutral grounds.

The final was held at various grounds in the early years of the competition, with a venue located somewhere in between the home towns of the two participating clubs usually chosen. In 1949 the final moved to Wembley Stadium, and was then played there every year until the competition ended. In the 1950s attendances for the final reached 100,000, comparable to the FA Cup final itself.

== Winners and finalists ==
Almost all of the winners over the years were from either the Isthmian League, based in London and the Home Counties, or the Northern League, based in North East England, with Bishop Auckland the most successful club with 10 wins. Amateur Cup winners who later turned professional and gained entry to the English Football League include Middlesbrough, West Hartlepool (merged to form Hartlepool United), Wimbledon, Wycombe Wanderers, Barnet, and Bromley. Ilford, Leytonstone and Walthamstow Avenue additionally merged to become Dagenham & Redbridge, a professional club which has also competed in the EFL.

Thirty-six clubs won the cup. The following clubs won the tournament more than once:

Club	League	Number of wins
Bishop Auckland	Northern League	10
Clapton	none/Isthmian League^{[A]}	5
Crook Town	Northern League	5
Dulwich Hamlet	Isthmian League	4
Bromley	Isthmian League/Athenian League	3
Hendon	Isthmian League/Athenian League	3
Leytonstone	Isthmian League	3
Stockton	Northern League	3
Enfield	Isthmian League	2
Ilford	Isthmian League	2
Leyton	Athenian League	2
Middlesbrough	Northern League	2
Old Carthusians	none	2
Pegasus	none	2
Walthamstow Avenue	Isthmian League	2

- A. Clapton did not play in a league at the time of the club's first Amateur Cup win, but played in the Isthmian League at the time of the remaining four victories.

== See also ==
- FA Sunday Cup
