= Forest School F.C. =

Forest School
- Full name: Forest School Football Club
- Founded: 1857
- Ground: The Park, Snaresbrook, London
Home colours

Forest School F.C. refers to the organised football teams which represent Forest School, Walthamstow. The first XI is the only school team to have played in the F.A. Cup. Former pupils of Forest School play for Old Foresters F.C.

== History ==
=== Early history ===
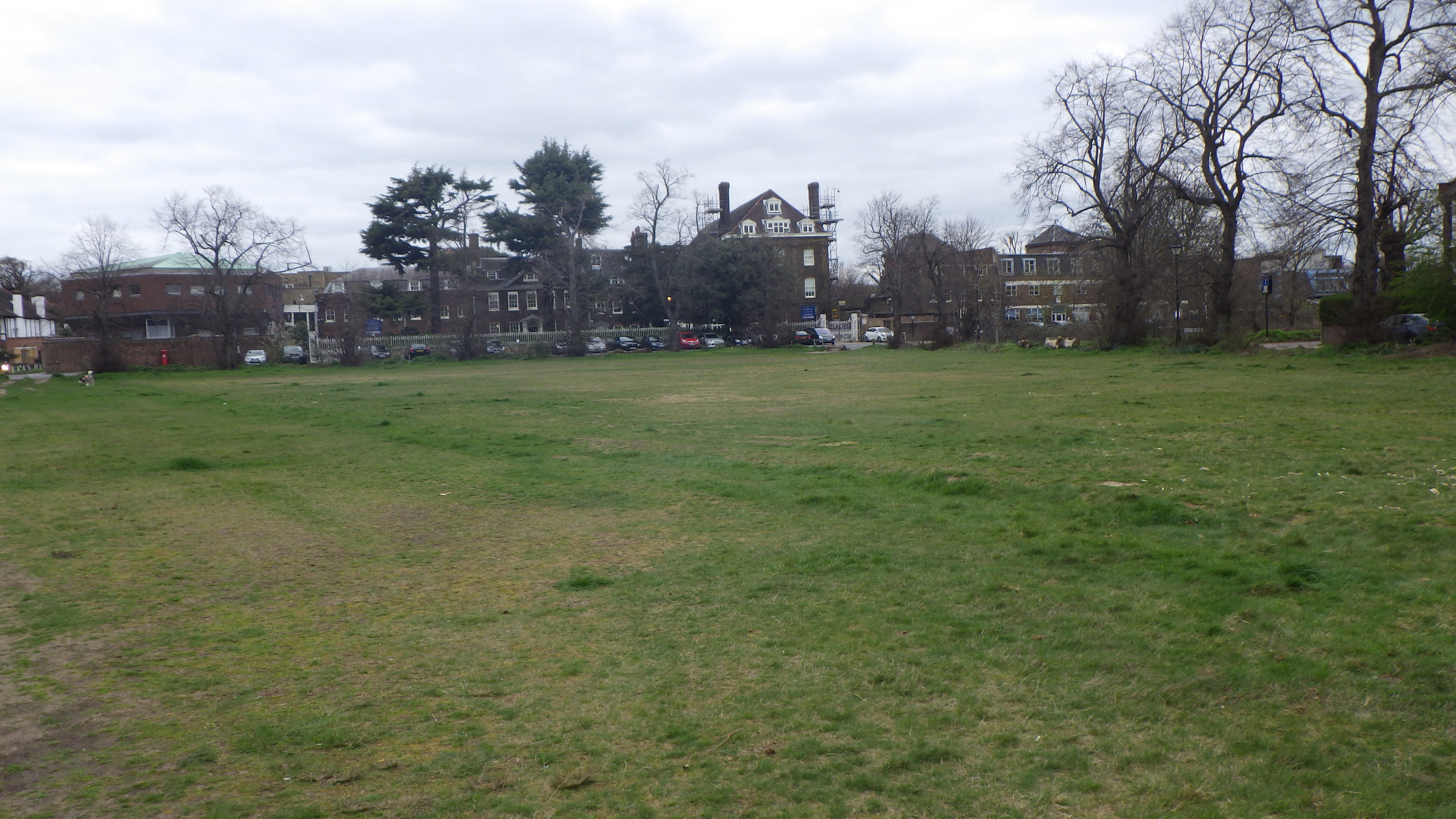
The Common at the front of the school was the site for all early Forest cricket and football matches.

Forest had an important role in the development and creation of association football, and the Common at the front of the school may well be regarded as a "cradle of the game". In the school's early years there was no sport apart from informal kick-abouts by the pupils, but by the 1840s cricket was played and hockey was in vogue in the early 1850s. Football began at Forest in 1857 when Frederick Guy took over as headmaster; it was played on The Common, at the front of the school. The Common was a rather uneven playing surface, with the great chestnut trees at the side of the pitch "in play" and some famous iron railings marking the north end of the pitch. Tradition records some great battles between Charles W. Alcock and F.J. Poole, in which the object was to barge the other player over the iron railings! The earliest reported match against another school was in Forest's first season on 24 February 1858, when Forest beat Chigwell School 5-4 on The Common. Another early game was on Saturday 16 November 1861, when Forest School, (playing as "Walthamstow"), lost to a Westminster School side (playing as "Bounding Bricks") by three goals to nil. A return match was played four weeks later, and in 1862 the school played against Old Westminsters (playing as Elizabethan Club).

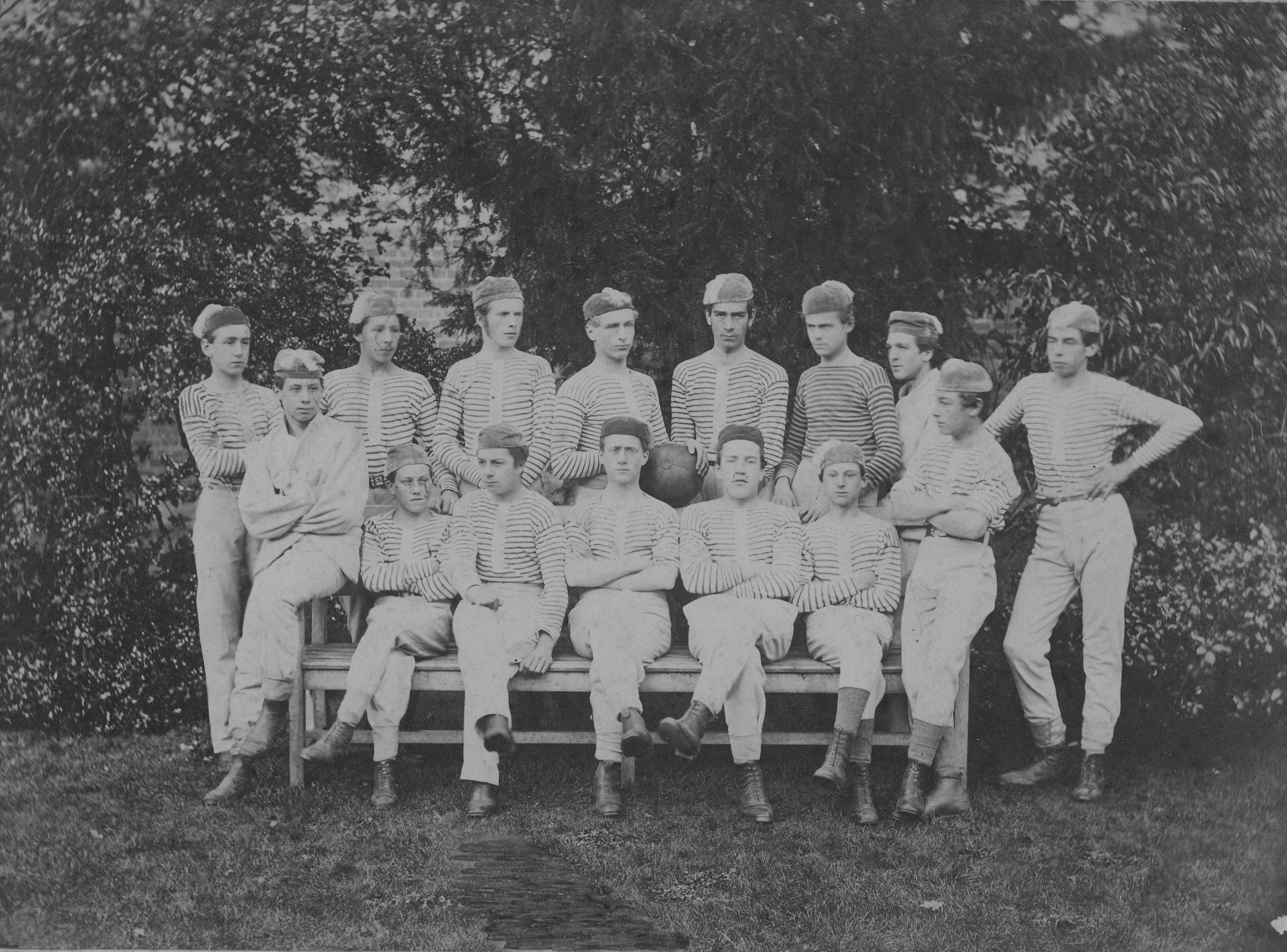
Forest School Football XV 1867

By 1863, Forest football had a major influence on the development of the game, and it was involved in the formation of the Football Association and also the leading club at the time, The Forest Club. Forest School joined the F.A. for its fifth meeting, on 1 December 1863, when John Bouch (brother of a pupil) and David John Morgan (recent Old Forester) represented the school on a 15-man committee. It was at this fifth F.A. meeting that the important amendment was made to the rules that running with the ball and hacking would be removed, and Forest, with only limited running with the ball in their rules, are likely to have been influential in voting for this change. Walter Cutbill, an Old Forester, served as an early member of the F.A. Committee and Henry Tubb, captain of Forest in 1867, helped the F.A. committee evolve its rules in that year.

=== Forest Rules ===
Although a member of the F.A. from almost the very beginning, the school's own rules, "The Forest Rules", were still played up until 1867, with 15 players a side. The Wanderers described the Forest Rules as "a happy mixture of Rugby, Harrow and Charterhouse rules". It was essentially a dribbling game, and "shinning, hacking and tripping" was not allowed.

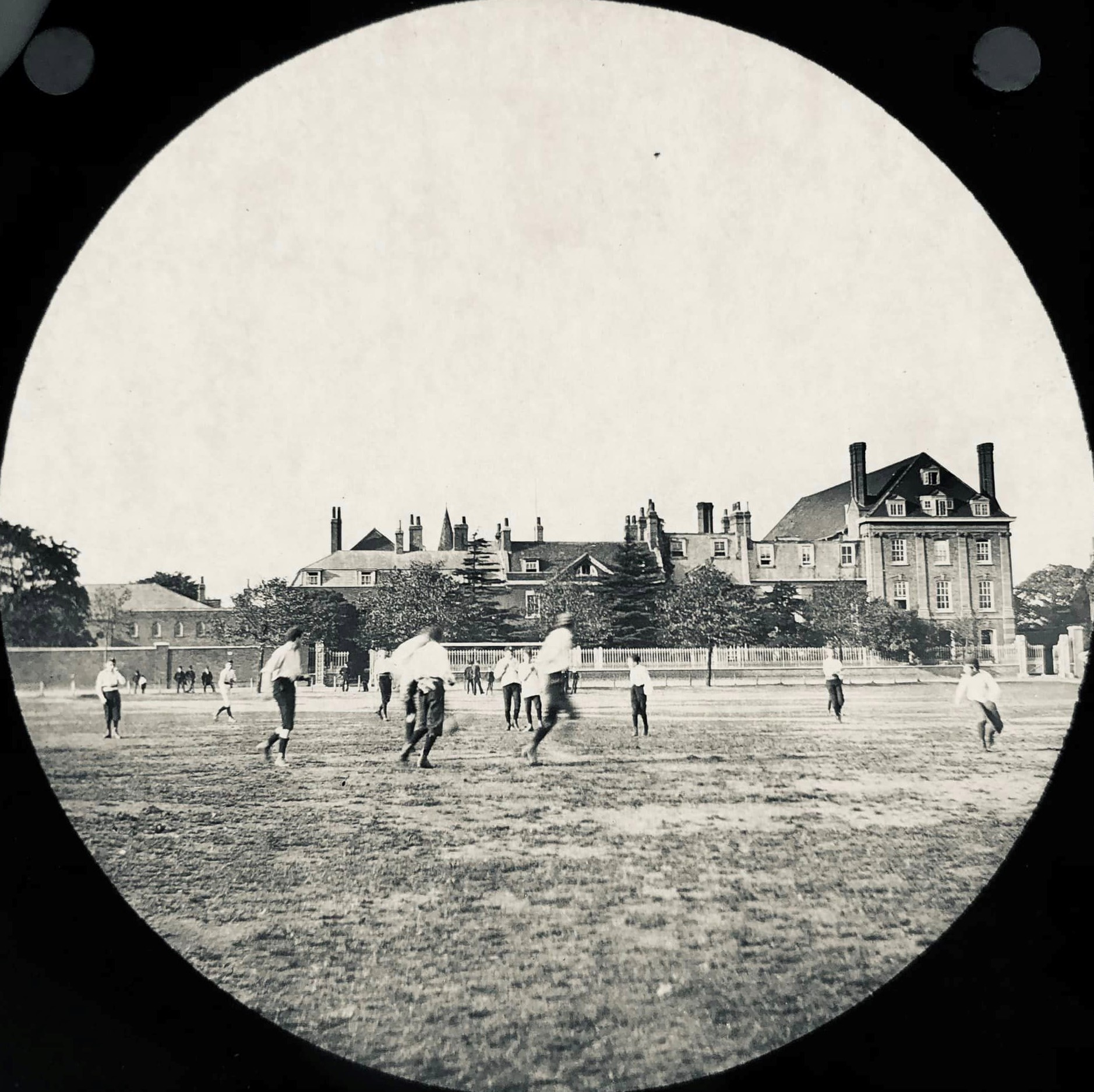
Forest School football on The Common, circa 1890

The Forest Rules, as played in 1866, were as follows:

1. That the goal posts be six yards apart.
2. That a base extend for thirty yards in front of goal, and that no person or player may enter this base except while following the ball, and when the ball is kicked out again, all players of the opposite side must go out of the base before again touching the ball.
3. There shall be no shinning, hacking or tripping.
4. That on catching the ball from a kick by one of the opposition side, before touching the ground, the person who has caught it may run with it.
5. If it goes beyond the boundary, it must be thrown in again by the person who touches it first.
6. If the ball is kicked behind the goal without going through the posts or over, it can be kicked off by the side to whom the goal belongs.
7. That there be no free kicks allowed.
8. That the ball when started must be kicked off the ground 30 yds. from the goal.

From the 1867-68 season Forest decided to play all its home matches under the rules of the Football Association, although away games could still be played under the local rules of the host club. 15 players per side could still be played up until 1869.

Forest is the only school to have played in the F.A. Cup, which it did for four seasons 1875-1879 (Donington School entered but did not play a game).

In 1993 the school won the inaugural Boodle And Dunthorpe Competition for Independent Schools.
