= Barbara Heslop =

New Zealand immunologist

Barbara Heslop CBE FRSNZ
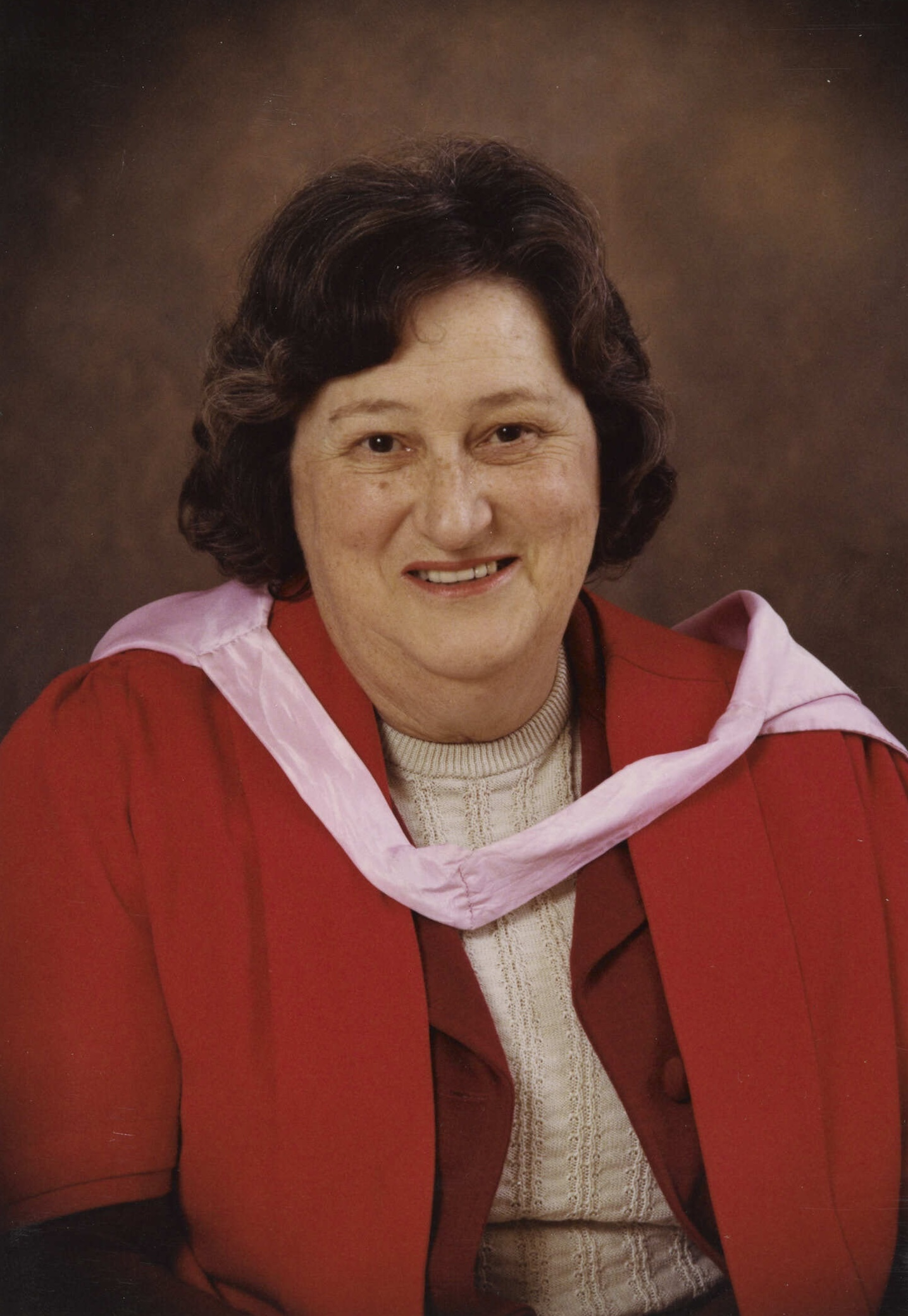
- Heslop in 1981
- Born: Barbara Farnsworth Heslop; 26 January 1925; Auckland, New Zealand
- Died: 20 December 2013 (aged 88); Dunedin, New Zealand
- Education: University of Otago
- Spouse: John Heslop (m. 1953)
- Children: 2
- Relatives: Helen Heslop (daughter)
- Scientific career
- Fields: Pathology; immunology
- Workplaces: University of Otago

Barbara Farnsworth Heslop CBE FRSNZ (née Cupit; 26 January 1925 – 20 December 2013) was a New Zealand immunologist specialising in transplantation immunology and immunogenetics.

== Biography ==
Born in Auckland, Heslop was educated at Epsom Girls' Grammar School from 1938 to 1941 and then attended the University of Otago, graduating MB ChB in 1949 and MD in 1954.

She married surgeon John Herbert Heslop, noted for his work on skin carcinogenesis. They had two daughters: Helen, a transplant scientist; and Hilary, a food specialist.

Heslop gained recognition in the medical community for both her research and her teaching, at a time when women scientists were scarce. She was made a Fellow of the Royal Australasian College of Surgeons (RACS) for services to surgical sciences in 1975. In 1990, in honour of her research achievements she was appointed a Fellow of the Royal Society of New Zealand mainly based on her publications on allogeneic lymphocyte cytotoxicity (a natural killer cell mediated phenomenon). The same year, she and her husband John Heslop were joint recipients of the Sir Louis Barnett Medal awarded by the RACS.

In the 1991 New Year Honours, Heslop was appointed a Commander of the Order of the British Empire, for services to medical education.

Heslop died in Dunedin in 2013.

In 2017, Heslop was selected as one of the Royal Society Te Apārangi's "150 women in 150 words", celebrating the contributions of women to knowledge in New Zealand.

== Heslop Medal ==
To commemorate Heslop's work and that of her husband, John Heslop, the Heslop Medal was established by the Royal Australasian College of Surgeons in 2004 to recognise and reward outstanding contributions to the Board of Basic Surgical Education and Training and its committees.

== Selected publications ==
- Heslop, Barbara F.; Zeiss, Irmgard M.; Nisbet, N. W. (1960). "Studies on transference of bone 1. A comparison of autologous and homologous bone implants with reference to osteocyte survival, osteogenesis and host reaction". The British Journal of Experimental Pathology. 41 (3): 269–287. PMC 2083263. PMID 14401480.
- Zeiss, Irmgard M.; Nisbet, N. W.; Heslop, Barbara F. (1960). "Studies on transference of bone. 2. Vascularization of autologous and homologous implants of cortical bone in rats". The British Journal of Experimental Pathology. 41 (4): 345–363. PMC 2083202. PMID 13847187.
- Nisbet, N. W.; Heslop, Barbara F.; Zeiss, Irmgard M. (1960). "Studies on transference of bone. III. Manifestations of immunological tolerance to implants of homologous cortical bone in rats". The British Journal of Experimental Pathology. 41 (5): 443–451. PMC 2082392. PMID 13729201.
- Heslop, Barbara F.; Hardy, B. E. (1971). "The distribution of ^{51}Cr-labeled syngeneic and allogeneic lymph node cells in the rat". Transplantation. 11 (2): 128–134. doi:10.1097/00007890-197102000-00004. PMID 5578737.(subscription required)
- Heslop, Barbara F. (2004). "'All about research'—looking back at the 1987 Cervical Cancer Inquiry" (PDF). The New Zealand Medical Journal. 117 (1199): 1–16. Archived from the original (PDF) on 6 March 2014. (A personal reflection on the anniversary of the Cartwright Inquiry.)
