= Fred Pelly =

English footballer (1868–1940)

Personal information
- Full name: Frederick Raymond Pelly
- Date of birth: 11 August 1868
- Place of birth: Upminster, England
- Date of death: 16 October 1940 (aged 72)
- Place of death: Upham, England
- Height: 6 ft 0 in (1.83 m)
- Position: Left back

Senior career*
Years	Team	Apps	(Gls)
1882–1886	Old Foresters		
1891–1898	Corinthian		
- Casuals

International career
1893–1894	England	3	(0)
- * Club domestic league appearances and goals

Frederick Raymond Pelly (11 August 1868 – 16 October 1940) was an English international footballer, who played as a left back.

== Early and personal life ==
Pelly was born in Upminster, later moving to Forest Rise in Walthamstow whilst still a child. As a result of his locality, Pelly attended the nearby Forest School.

Pelly was the grandson of John Pelly, who served as governor of the Hudson's Bay Company from 1822 to 1852 and Governor of the Bank of England from 1841 to 1842.

== Club career ==
"I don't mind taking a tumble or two there, but when I fell to the ground I couldn't get rid of the smell for weeks."

— Pelly remarks on Millwall Athletic's Athletic Grounds home, which sat next to the Millwall Dock.

As a result of attending Forest School, Pelly played for Old Foresters, joining the club in 1882. Pelly later captained the club, before joining Corinthian in 1891. Pelly played for Corinthian for seven years, before joining Casuals, captaining the team. Pelly also played for London FA and Essex FA representative teams, captaining the latter.

== International career ==
Pelly's first taste of international football came on 19 December 1891, starting in a 6–1 unofficial friendly win against North America at The Oval, playing in a two man defence alongside C. B. Fry. On 25 February 1893, Pelly won his first official cap for England, playing in a 6–1 win against Ireland, playing alongside Hugh Harrison in defence. The following year, Pelly would make his final two appearances for England - a 5–1 win away to Wales in March and a 2–2 draw away to Scotland in April.
