= Kweku Etrew Amua-Sekyi =

Supreme Court Judge

Supreme Court Judge
- In office 1987 – 22 December 1987

Personal details
- Born: Kweku Etrew Amua-Sekyi; 5 July 1933 Sekondi
- Died: May 17, 2007 (aged 73)
- Spouse: Georgina Hackman (m. 1967)
- Children: 3
- Education: Osei Tutu Senior High School; Forest School, Walthamstow; Dulwich College; London school of Economics; University of Poitiers
- Profession: Judge
- Known for: Chairman of the National Reconciliation Commission

Kweku Etrew Amua-Sekyi (5 July 1933 – May 17, 2007) was a Ghanaian Supreme Court Judge. He served on the bench of the Supreme Court of the Gambia and the Supreme Court of Ghana. He was the chairman for the National Reconciliation Commission that was set up through the Parliament of Ghana in 2002.

== Early life and education ==
Amua-Sekyi was born on 5 July 1933 at Sekondi in the Western Region of Ghana.

Both his father Kobina Amua-Sekyi and mother Comfort Amua-Sekyi (née Ogunro) were traditional rulers, with his father also serving as an MP under the Busia Administration. He began his primary education at Achimota Primary School from 1938 to 1945. He later proceeded to Osei Tutu Secondary School in Kumasi for his secondary education. He later left for the United Kingdom to continue his secondary education at Forest School at Snaresbrook, London.

After obtaining his Ordinary level ('O'-Level) certificate, he enrolled at Dulwich College in 1953 for his Advanced level ('A'-Level) certificate. He entered the London School of Economics, University of London where he obtained his Bachelor of Science degree in Economics and International Relations, and enrolled at the University of Poitiers, France in 1957 to acquire a diploma on French studies. In 1958, he returned to Ghana to work with the Ghana Foreign Service and after about four years of serving the Ghana Foreign Service he returned to London to read law at the Middle Temple, completing his studies in 1964. He was called to the English bar in 1965, that same year, he was also called to the Ghana Bar upon his return to Ghana.

== Career ==
Amua-Sekyi begun private legal practice in 1965. In 1968, he established his law firm, Ekuadaa Chambers in Takoradi, Western Region. He remained in private legal practice for twelve years until his appointment as justice of the High Court by the then head of state; Ignatius Kutu Acheampong in 1977.

Nine years later he was elevated to the Appeals Court bench by the then head of state Jerry John Rawlings. A year later he was appointed, Justice of the Supreme Court of Ghana but retired on 22 December 1987. He was a member of the Organization of African Unity (OAU) Administrative Tribunal in Addis Ababa and also chaired the Disciplinary Committee of the General Legal Council.

He chaired the Legal Aid Committee in 1988 and in 1994 he was appointed chairman of the Council for Law reporting. As a Justice of the Supreme Court of the Gambia, he retired in 2001. In October 2002, following the establishment of the National Reconciliation Commission, he was appointed Chairman of the commission that remained from 2002 until his task was completed in 2004.

== Personal life ==
Amua-Sekyi married Georgina Hackman, formerly a tutor at Wesley Girls' High School in Cape Coast, in 1967. They had three children. He died on 17 May 2007 at the age of 73.

== See also ==
- National Reconciliation Commission
- List of judges of the Supreme Court of Ghana
- Supreme Court of Ghana
