= John Heslop =

New Zealand surgeon and cricket administrator

John Heslop CBE
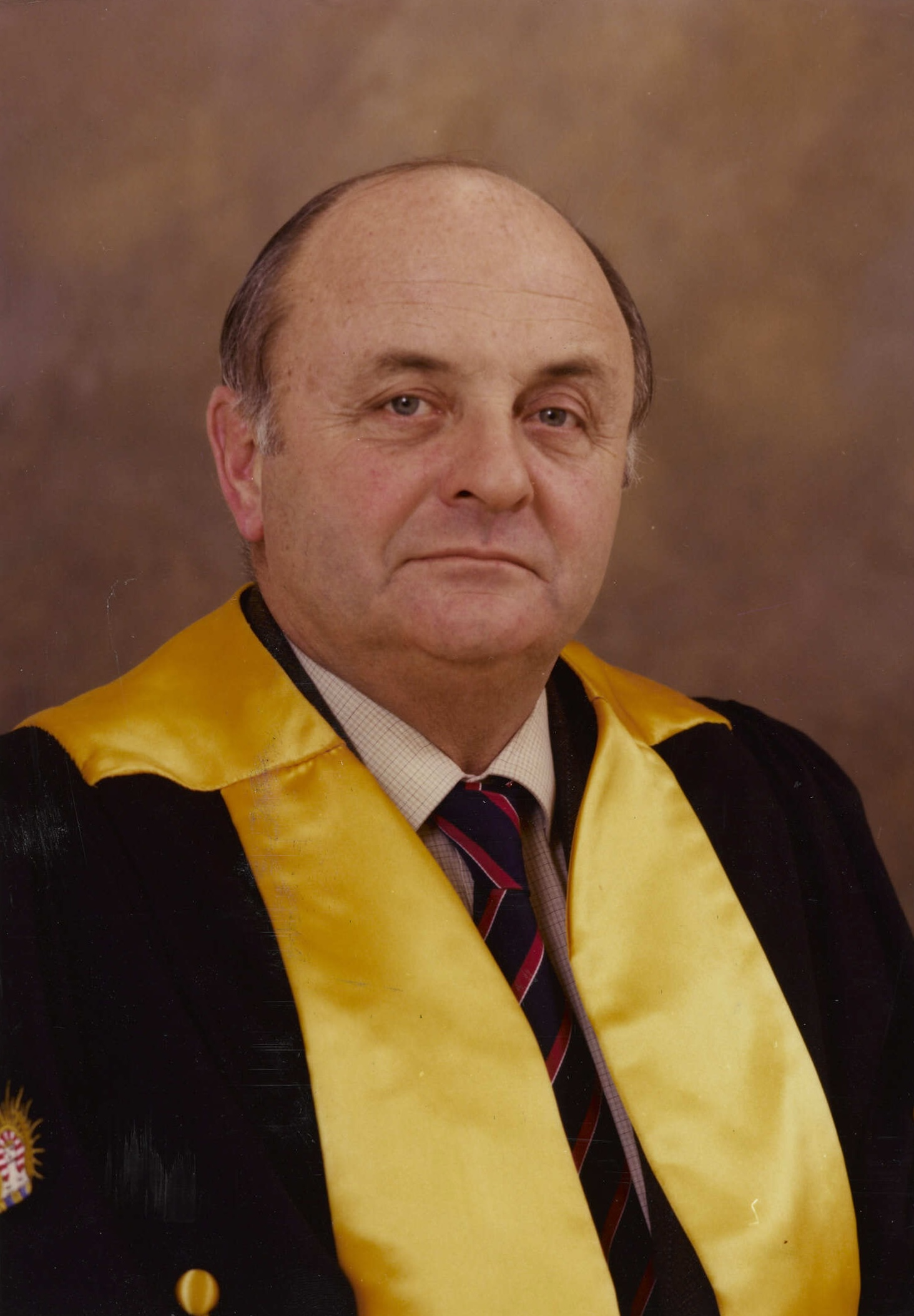
- Heslop in 1981
- Born: 21 March 1925; Dunedin, New Zealand
- Died: 21 June 2014 (aged 89); Dunedin, New Zealand
- Education: University of Otago
- Spouse: Barbara Heslop (m. 1953; died 2013)
- Children: 2
- Relatives: Helen Heslop (daughter)
- Scientific career
- Fields: Surgery
- Workplaces: University of Otago

John Herbert Heslop CBE (21 March 1925 – 21 June 2014) was a New Zealand surgeon noted for his treatment of burns. He was also active as a sports—particularly cricket—administrator, serving as president of the New Zealand Cricket Council from 1987 to 1989.

== Biography ==
Heslop attended the University of Otago, graduating MB ChB in 1950 and ChM in 1959. He was a lecturer, senior lecturer and then associate professor in the Department of Surgery at the University of Otago from 1957 to 1984.

In 1960 he was appointed surgeon-in-charge of the Dunedin Hospital burns unit, and served as president of the Australia and New Zealand Burns Association and as the New Zealand representative on the committee of the International Burn Society. For a time he was the president of the New Zealand Cancer Society and, between 1983 and 1987, he chaired the research advisory committee of the Royal Australasian College of Surgeons (RACS). He was involved in the establishment of the New Zealand Federation of Sports Medicine in 1963.

He married immunologist Barbara Farnsworth Cupit. They had two daughters: Helen, a transplant scientist; and Hilary, a food specialist.

In 1990, he and his wife Barbara Heslop were joint recipients of the Sir Louis Barnett Medal awarded by the RACS.

Heslop played cricket for the Otago University club and was later active in the administration of the sport. He served as an Otago selector between 1960 and 1966, and as president of the Otago Cricket Association from 1966 to 1968. He was a board member of the New Zealand Cricket Council for 12 years, and served as its president between 1987 and 1989. He was twice the manager of the New Zealand national cricket team: for the 1975 Cricket World Cup; and on the 1985 tour to the West Indies. He was an honorary medical officer to both the Otago Rugby Football Union and New Zealand Cricket.

In the 1996 New Year Honours, Heslop was appointed a Commander of the Order of the British Empire, for services to medicine, sport and the community.

Heslop died in Dunedin in 2014.

== Heslop Medal ==
To commemorate Heslop's work and that of his wife, Barbara Heslop, the Heslop Medal was established by the RACS in 2004 to recognise and reward outstanding contributions to the Board of Basic Surgical Education and Training and its committees.
