= Helen Heslop =

New Zealand physician-scientist

- Education: University of Otago
- Scientific career
- Fields: Immunotherapy
- Thesis: The effects of interleukin 2 on haemopoietic regeneration (1989)

Helen Elisabeth Heslop is a physician-scientist from New Zealand whose clinical interests are in hematopoietic stem cell transplants. Heslop’s research focuses on immunotherapy to treat viral infections, post transplant and hematologic malignancies. She is a professor in the Department of Medicine and Pediatrics at Baylor College of Medicine and the director of the Center for Cell and Gene Therapy at Baylor College of Medicine, Texas Children’s Hospital and Houston Methodist Hospital. She is also the Dan L. Duncan Chair and the associate director of clinical research at the Dan L. Duncan Cancer Center.

Heslop was a co-editor of the sixth edition of Hematology: Basic Principles and Practice, which is widely considered one of the best available hematology textbooks.

== Education ==
Heslop, daughter of surgeon John Herbert Heslop and immunologist Barbara Farnsworth Heslop, was raised in New Zealand. She was educated at Kaikorai Valley High School in Dunedin, before attending the University of Otago, from where she graduated MB ChB in 1980. She was a fellow in the Department of Haematology at Royal Free Hospital in London, England, where she conducted research into transplantation immunology, leading to the award of MD from Otago in 1990. She completed a postdoctoral research fellowship at St. Jude Children's Research Hospital in Memphis, Tennessee.

Heslop's first faculty appointment was as Assistant Member of the Division of Bone Marrow Transplantation in the Department of Hematology-Oncology at the St. Jude Children's Research Hospital. She became an Associate Member in 1994. She also held an appointment as Associate Professor in the Department of Pediatrics at the University of Tennessee in Memphis. Heslop joined the faculty at Baylor College of Medicine in 1997 and in 2006 was named the first Dan L. Duncan Chair for Baylor College of Medicine.

== Research ==
With Cliona Rooney, Heslop was the first to demonstrate that antigen-specific cytotoxic T cells could be used to eradicate an established malignancy. In the early 1990s, Heslop and Rooney developed methods for early diagnosis of Epstein–Barr virus induced lymphoproliferative disease. The disease is a complication that occurred in about 15 percent of unrelated or mismatched family member bone marrow transplants at that time. The doctors generated cytotoxic T lymphocytes from the bone marrow donors. Their therapeutic approach to Epstein–Barr virus induced lymphoproliferative disease has since been extended to Hodgkin disease, Non-Hodgkin lymphoma and nasopharyngeal cancer. Heslop also studies the use of third-party cytotoxic T cells to treat viral infections after transplant.

Together with other Center for Cell and Gene Therapy doctors, Heslop runs over 20 clinical trials of antigen specific and genetically modified T cells. She has extensive experience in developing and conducting transplant and cell and gene therapy studies.

Heslop directs a Lymphoma SPORE program, a program project grant from the NCI, and a Specialized Center of Research from the Leukemia & Lymphoma Society. She is the current President of the Foundation for Accreditation of Cell Therapy and a past President of the American Society of Blood and Bone Marrow Transplantation.

In 2013, she was conferred with an honorary DSc by the University of Otago.
