= Hubert Waugh =

English cricketer

Personal information
- Full name: Hubert Percy Waugh
- Born: 24 December 1898; West Ham, Essex, England
- Died: 13 December 1954 (aged 55); Dollis Hill, Middlesex, England
- Batting: Right-handed
- Bowling: Right-arm medium

Domestic team information
- Years: Team
- 1937: Minor Counties
- 1934–1939: Suffolk
- 1919–1929: Essex

Career statistics
Competition	First-class
Matches	9
Runs scored	251
Batting average	15.68
100s/50s	1/–
Top score	128
Balls bowled	318
Wickets	4
Bowling average	42.00
5 wickets in innings	–
10 wickets in match	–
Best bowling	1/6
Catches/stumpings	9/–
- Source: Cricinfo, 27 October 2011

Hubert Percy Waugh (24 December 1898 – 13 December 1954) was an English cricketer. Waugh was a right-handed batsman who bowled right-arm at medium pace. He was born at West Ham, Essex and educated at Forest School, Walthamstow.

Waugh made his first-class debut for Essex against the Australian Imperial Forces in 1919. Three further first-class appearances following in that year, but Waugh would have to wait until 1928 before his next first-class appearance for the county. He made two first-class appearances in that year, before making two final appearances against Gloucestershire in the 1929 County Championship. He made a total of eight first-class appearances for Essex, scoring a total of 213 runs at an average of 15.21, with a high score of 128. This score which came against Glamorgan in 1928 was the only time he passed fifty. After playing for Essex he appeared a number of years later for Suffolk, making his debut for the county in the 1934 Minor Counties Championship against Lincolnshire. He played Minor counties cricket for Suffolk from 1934 to 1939, making 40 appearances. He captained Suffolk for five years till World War II, scoring 1,515 runs and taking 84 wickets. While playing for Suffolk he appeared in a single first-class match for the Minor Counties against the touring New Zealanders. In this match, he scored 30 runs in the Minor Counties first-innings, before being dismissed by Alby Roberts, while in their second-innings he was dismissed for 8 by Bill Carson.

He died from cancer at Dollis Hill, Middlesex on 13 December 1954.
