= John Dennis (ornithologist) =

American ornithologist and botanist

John Value Dennis
- Born: 1915; Princess Anne, Maryland, U.S.
- Died: December 1, 2002 (aged 86–87); Princess Anne, Maryland
- Resting place: Princess Anne, Maryland
- Education: University of Wisconsin; University of Florida
- Scientific career
- Fields: Ornithology

John Value Dennis (1915/1916 – December 1, 2002) was an American ornithologist and botanist.

== Early life ==
John V. Dennis was born in 1915 in Princess Anne, Maryland to Alfred and Mary Dennis (nee Value). Alfred Dennis died when Dennis was a teenager. Mary operated a boarding house in Washington, D.C.

Dennis was an undergraduate at George Washington University. His education was interrupted by World War II. During the war, he served as a radar technician with the Flying Tigers aircraft unit in Yunnan, China.

He finished his undergraduate education at the University of Wisconsin, obtaining a degree in political science. This was followed by a master's degree in botany from the University of Florida. He started, but did not complete, a PhD in ornithology at the University of Illinois.

== Work and contributions ==
=== Botany ===
In 1976, Dennis and fellow botanist Dr. C.R. Gunn wrote the guide World Guide to Tropical Drift Seeds and Fruits. Additionally, Dennis co-authored Sea-Beans from the Tropics: A Collector's Guide to Sea-Beans With Ed Perry. While some of Dennis' work, like that on sea beans, the floatation of tropical drift seeds, are written from a more scientific perspective, Dennis' work also guided amateur gardeners and botanists, like The Wildlife Gardener, which describes how to design a garden that attracts local wildlife. Dennis' work was often through a conservation lens, such as his book The Great Cypress Swamps, where he discusses the importance and history of swampland in the United States.

=== Search for the Ivory-Billed Woodpecker ===
Dennis studied woodpeckers extensively, and is credited with creating a repellent to keep woodpeckers off telephone polls.

In particular he was interested in, and searched extensively for, the critically endangered ivory-billed woodpecker in Cuba and in old-growth forests of the southeastern United States.

In 1948, working with Davis Crompton, he traveled to the Oriente Province of Cuba and located a subspecies, called the Cuban ivory-billed woodpecker, after it had not been reported there for several years. He reported a sighting in the Big Thicket of southeast Texas in 1966, which he called his "only good look at a North American ivorybill"; he returned in 1968, recording what he believed to be the bird's call.

Many ornithologists, including James Tanner, generally regarded as the leading authority on ivory-bills, were skeptical of both the sighting and the recorded bird. His sightings formed part of the basis for the creation of the Big Thicket National Preserve.

=== Bird feeding ===
He wrote A Complete Guide to Bird Feeding (1975), a book that increased interest in bird feeding. This book was largely credited for increasing interest in bird feeding in the United States, and was reprinted in 1994.

== Personal life ==
Dennis married his wife, Mary Alice in 1945. They had two daughters, and a son.

Dennis died of a brain tumor in 2002 at his home in Princess Anne, Maryland.

== Partial list of works ==
- Dennis, J. V. (1948). "A last remnant of Ivory-billed Woodpecker in Cuba." Auk 65:497–507.
- —— (1967). "The Ivory-bill flies still." Audubon 69(6):38–45.
- —— (1975). A Complete Guide to Bird Feeding.
- —— (1988). The Great Cypress Swamp.
