= John B. Dennis =

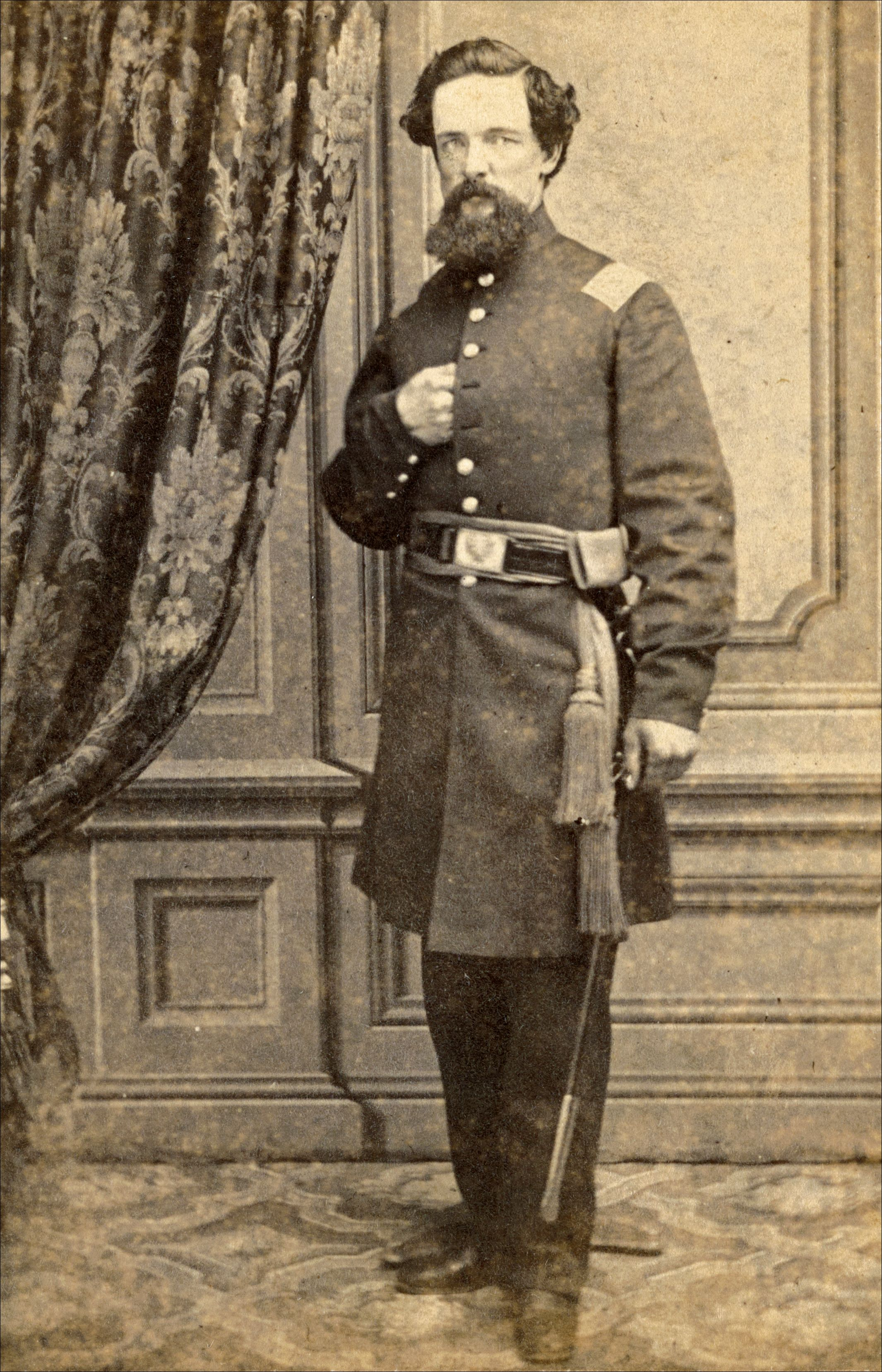
- Born: May 23, 1835
- Died: December 26, 1894 (aged 59); Melrose, Massachusetts, US
- Burial place: Forest Lawn Cemetery; Omaha, Nebraska, US
- Military career
- Allegiance: United States; Union
- Branch: United States Army; Union Army
- Rank: Major; Brevet Brigadier General
- Units: 6th Massachusetts Militia; 7th Connecticut Volunteer Infantry
- Conflicts: American Civil War

John Benjamin Dennis (May 23, 1835 – December 26, 1894) was a Union Army officer during the American Civil War who was subsequently appointed a brevet brigadier general. He was a metal worker before the war. At the beginning of the war, he served as a private with the 6th Massachusetts Militia. He later served as a captain in the 7th Connecticut Volunteer Infantry. He was severely wounded at the Battle of Pocotaligo in South Carolina. He was later captured at Bermuda Hundred, Virginia, on June 2, 1864.

After his release, he was appointed major and additional paymaster on January 25, 1865. He subsequently received appointments to the brevet ranks of lieutenant colonel and colonel to rank from March 13, 1865. He was mustered out of the volunteers on July 31, 1865. On December 8, 1868, President Andrew Johnson nominated Dennis for appointment to the grade of brevet brigadier general of volunteers, to rank from March 13, 1865, and the United States Senate confirmed the appointment on February 16, 1869.

After the war, Dennis was a lawyer and Internal Revenue Service official.

John B. Dennis died in Melrose, Massachusetts, on December 26, 1894, but was buried in Forest Lawn Cemetery, Omaha, Nebraska.

== See also ==
- List of American Civil War brevet generals (Union)
