= Jack Dennis (cricketer) =

English cricketer

Personal information
- Full name: John Newman Dennis
- Born: 4 January 1913; Leytonstone, Essex, England
- Died: 21 August 2006 (aged 93); England
- Batting: Right-handed

Domestic team information
- Years: Team
- 1934–1939: Essex

Career statistics
Competition	First-class
Matches	22
Runs scored	530
Batting average	17.66
100s/50s	–/1
Top score	53
Balls bowled	–
Wickets	–
Bowling average	–
5 wickets in innings	–
10 wickets in match	–
Best bowling	–
Catches/stumpings	13/–
- Source: Cricinfo, 24 October 2011

John Newman Dennis (4 January 1913 – 21 August 2006) was an English cricketer. Dennis was a right-handed batsman. He was born at Leytonstone, Essex. He was educated at Forest School, Walthamstow.

Dennis made his first-class debut for Essex against Glamorgan in the 1934 County Championship. A further first-class appearance came in 1936, while in the following three seasons he made a handful of appearances in each, making a total of 22 appearances between 1934 and 1939. In his 22 first-class appearances, he scored 530 runs at a batting average of 17.66, with a high score of 53. This score, which was his only first-class fifty, came against Sussex in 1937.

He died on 21 August 2006.
