= Re Akoto and 7 Others =

1961 court case in Ghana

- Court: Supreme Court of Ghana
- Full case name: Re Akoto and 7 Others
- Decided: 28 August 1961
- Citation: [1961] GLR 523

Case history
- Appealed from: High Court of Ghana
- Appealed to: Supreme Court of Ghana

Court membership
- Judges sitting: Kobina Arku Korsah; William Bedford Van Lare; Augustus Molade Akiwumi

Case opinions
- Decision by: Korsah
- Concurrence: Lare; Akiwumi

Keywords
- Rule of Law; Separation of Powers; Judicial Review; habeas corpus

The case of Re Akoto and 7 Others is a landmark decision of the Supreme Court of Ghana that challenged the legality of the Preventive Detention Act (PDA). The case centered on the arrest of Baffour Akoto, the then Chief Linguist of the Asantehene, along with seven others, who were detained under the Preventive Detention Act (PDA). Their lawyer, J. B. Danquah, petitioned the High Court for a habeas corpus order to secure their release, but the court denied the request. The case was then appealed to the Supreme Court, which ultimately ruled that the Preventive Detention Act did not violate the Constitution and that Parliament had the authority to enact such a law, even during peacetime. The key principles of the case involve the Rule of Law, Separation of Powers, and Judicial Review.

== Background ==
The Preventive Detention Act (PDA) was passed by Parliament in 1958, granting the executive branch the power to arrest and detain individuals without trial if their actions were deemed harmful to the state. Under this law, Baffour Akoto, the Chief Linguist of the Asantehene, along with seven others; Peter Alex Danso (alias Kwaku Danso), Osei Assibey Mensah, Nana Antwi Bosiako (alias John Mensah), Joseph Kojo Antwi-Kusi (alias Anane Antwi-Kusi), Benjamin Kweku Owusu, Andrew Kojo Edusei, and Halidu Kramo were arrested and detained on the 10 and 11 November 1959. Their detention was authorised by an order from the Governor-General, signed by the Minister of Interior under section 2 of the PDA. The grounds for their detention were allegations that they had encouraged acts of violence in the Ashanti and Brong-Ahafo regions and had associated with individuals advocating violence to achieve political aims. Baffour Akoto was notably a founding member of the National Liberation Movement (NLM), a political group that supported a federal system for Ghana.

The detainees sought legal recourse by filing for writs of habeas corpus ad subjiciendum in the High Court, but their application was denied. They subsequently appealed the High Court's decision to the Supreme Court.

In the case, with Baffour Akoto and his co-appellants as the petitioners, their legal representation was led by Dr. J. B. Danquah. The respondents were represented by the then Attorney General Geoffrey Bing, with A. N. E. Amissah assisting.

The Supreme Court, presided over by Chief Justice Korsah, along with Justices Van Lare and Akiwumi, was tasked on 28 August 1961, with interpreting Article 13(1) of the 1960 Republican Constitution and determining its consistency with the Preventive Detention Act of 1958, under which the appellants had been detained without trial for actions "prejudicial to the security of the State."

== Legal arguments ==
J. B. Danquah raised seven key points before the Supreme Court on behalf of the appellants:

- The High Court judge exceeded his jurisdiction by refusing the application without ordering a formal return.
- The Habeas Corpus Act 1816 (56 Geo. 3. c. 100) required the court to investigate the truth of the facts upon which the Governor-General, Kwame Nkrumah, justified the arrest order.
- The Minister of Interior, A. E. Nkumsah, who signed the order on behalf of the Governor-General, acted with malice.
- The grounds for detention did not qualify as "acts prejudicial to the security of the State."
- The Governor-General was restricted by the Criminal Procedure Code from ordering the arrest and detention of the appellants without trial, except under its provisions.
- The Preventive Detention Act, 1958, exceeded the powers granted to Parliament by the Constitution, or it violated the President's solemn declaration of fundamental principles upon taking office.
- The Preventive Detention Act, enacted during peacetime without an emergency declaration, violated the Constitution of the Republic of Ghana.

Attorney General Geoffrey Bing on the other hand defended the Preventive Detention Act, asserting that the President's declaration upon assuming office was a moral obligation without legal enforceability. He equated the Ghanaian Parliament's sovereignty to that of the UK Parliament, suggesting that Parliament had the authority to enact laws necessary for state security, including the Preventive Detention Act, even in peacetime.

== Supreme Court ruling ==
The Supreme Court dismissed the appeal, ruling as follows:

- The affidavits provided sufficient facts to determine whether the writ should be issued, and the judge was not obligated to make a formal return in every case.
- The Habeas Corpus Act 1816, though generally applicable, did not apply because the Preventive Detention Act granted full discretion to the Governor-General. The court's only concern was the legality of the order; if the order was lawful, so was the detention.
- Allegations of bad faith against high-ranking state officials required positive evidence, which was lacking in this case.
- The term "security of the state" encompassed more than just defense against foreign threats; it also included preventing internal disruptions. The Preventive Detention Act was distinct from the Criminal Code, focusing on preventing future harmful acts rather than punishing past ones.
- Article 13(1) of the Constitution imposed a moral, not legal, obligation on the President, similar to the Queen of England's Coronation Oath. The declaration did not constitute a bill of rights or create enforceable legal obligations.
- Article 20 of the Constitution affirmed Parliament's sovereignty, with legislative powers limited only by entrenched articles.
- Therefore, the Preventive Detention Act, 1958, did not violate the Constitution, and Parliament had the authority to enact such a law even in peacetime.

== Aftermath ==
Following the court's verdict, Baffour Akoto and the seven other detainees remained imprisoned until 1966 when the Nkrumah government was overthrown in a coup d'état. Although Geoffrey Bing was the Attorney General in the Nkrumah Administration, he claimed to have opposed the enactment of the Preventive Detention Act of 1958 (No. 17). Bing stated, "My argument against the Act (PDA), which had some support within the Cabinet, had no impact on the majority of its members or on Dr. Nkrumah, who supported the idea from the outset" (Bing, 1968). According to Bing, the then Minister of Information, Kofi Baako, also opposed the introduction of the PDA. However, the majority of Cabinet members, including Nkrumah himself, supported the passage of the PDA Bill. Bing reiterated his opposition to the PDA in his 1968 book, Reap the Whirlwind.

In recognition of the case's significance, the Asantehene, Otumfuo Nana Osei Tutu II, established the Re: Akoto Memorial Lectures, an annual event organised by the Ghana School of Law. This lecture series is dedicated to promoting research, fostering study, and educating the public on the evolution of Ghana's constitutional democracy and human rights.

== See also ==
- Landmark Decisions of the Supreme Court of Ghana
