= Center for Cell and Gene Therapy =

US research institute

Coordinates: 29.70988°N 95.39956°W

The Center for Cell and Gene Therapy is a translational research institute within Baylor College of Medicine, Texas Children's Hospital and Houston Methodist Hospital, all of which are located in the Texas Medical Center in Houston, Texas. The center's mission is to develop novel therapies for a range of diseases through collaboration between basic research laboratories and clinical departments. The center was founded by Dr. Malcolm K. Brenner in 1998 and includes six major parts. The current director is Dr. Helen E. Heslop, physician-scientist who specializes in translational research.

The Center for Cell and Gene Therapy conducts research into numerous diseases, including but not limited to pediatric cancers, diabetes, HIV, glioma and cardiovascular disease. The center has laboratory space in both Baylor College of Medicine and Texas Children's Hospital, and clinical units in Texas Children's and Methodist Hospitals.

The Texas Children's Hospital is home to the center's Translational Research Labs and Good Manufacturing Practice (GMP) Laboratories. The Center for Cell and Gene Therapy has the largest academic GMP facility in the world, with 8,600 square feet of Class 10,000 (ISO7) cleanroom space. The GMP Gene Vector Lab produces clinical grade vectors for use in Phase I/II trials, while the GMP Clinical Research Lab prepares patient components for clinical trials. The Gene Vector Lab was one of only three National Gene Vector Laboratories until that entity was replaced by the National Gene Vector Biorepository in 2008. The Research Lab is a member of the Production Assistance for Cell Therapies (PACT).

The Stem Cell Transplantation Program has two units. The pediatric unit has more than 16,000 square feet on the eighth floor of Texas Children's Hospital's West Tower. The 30,000-square foot adult unit is in The Methodist Hospital's Main Tower.
