= 1877–78 FA Cup =

1877–78 FA Cup (7th edition)
Tournament details
- Country: England
- Dates: 27 October 1877; 23 March 1878
- Teams: 43

Final positions
- Champions: Wanderers F.C. (5th title)
- Runners-up: Royal Engineers A.F.C.
- Semifinalists: Old Harrovians A.F.C.

Tournament statistics
- Matches played: 45
- Goals scored: 176 (3.91 per match)
- Top goal scorer(s): Robert Hedley (Royal Engineers A.F.C.); John Wylie (Wanderers F.C.) (6 goals)

The 1877–78 Football Association Challenge Cup was the seventh staging of the FA Cup, England's oldest football tournament. Forty-three teams entered, six more than the previous season, although four of the forty-three never played a match.

== Calendar ==
Round	Date	Fixtures					Clubs	New entries this round
Round	Date	Original	Plays	Replays	Walkovers	Byes	Clubs	New entries this round
First round	27 October - 1 December 1877	21	18	2	3	1	43 → 22	42
Second round	8 - 29 December 1877	11	10	0	1	0	22 → 11	1
Third round	12 January - 16 February 1878	5	4	3	0	1	11 → 6	none
Fourth round	15 February - 12 March 1878	3	3	2	0	0	6 → 3	none
Semi-finals	16 March 1878	1	1	0	0	1	3 → 2	none
Final	23 March 1878	1	1	0	0	0	2 → 1	none

== First round ==
27 October 1877	Grantham F.C.	0–2	Clapham Rovers F.C.	London Road Ground, Grantham
			Mackem; W. Taylor	Attendance: 650

27 October 1877	High Wycombe F.C.	4–0	Wood Grange F.C.	West Ham Park, West Ham, London
	Grange; Wellcombe; Unknown

27 October 1877	Maidenhead F.C.	10–0	Reading Hornets F.C.	York Road, Maidenhead
	F. Price; W.E. Lovegrove; Unknown

2 November 1877	Cambridge University A.F.C.	3–1	Southill Park F.C.	St John's College, Cambridge
	Churchill; Alfred Lyttelton		Unknown

3 November 1877	Hawks F.C.	5–2	Minerva F.C.	Anerley, London
	J.R. Fox; J. Hamilton; Pitman; Ram; Rumball		Clegg; Duthie

3 November 1877	Hendon F.C.	0–2	Great Marlow F.C.	Unconfirmed
			Flint

3 November 1877	Notts County F.C.	1–1	Sheffield F.C.	Trent Bridge, West Bridgford
	Charles Curhsam		Arthur Cursham	Attendance: 1500

3 November 1877	Oxford University A.F.C.	5–2	Hertfordshire Rangers F.C.	The Parks, Oxford
	Unknown		Unknown

3 November 1877	Pilgrims F.C.	0–0	Ramblers F.C.	Lordship Lane, Tottenham, London

7 November 1877	Darwen F.C.	3–0	Manchester A.F.C.	Barley Bank, Darwen
	Lewis; James Knowles; Unknown			Attendance: 714

7 November 1877	Reading F.C.	2–0	South Norwood F.C.	Dolphin Ground, Slough
	Charles Field; H. Wilson (o.g.)			Attendance: 700

10 November 1877	105th Regiment F.C.	0–2	Old Harrovians F.C.	Regimental Barracks, Colchester
			Herbert Bevington; Harry Betts

10 November 1877	1st Surrey Rifles F.C.	1–0	Forest School F.C.	Flodden Road, Camberwell, London
	Kirkpatrick

10 November 1877	Panthers F.C.	1–9	Wanderers F.C.	The Oval, Kennington, London
	E. Farquharson		Hubert Heron; Jarvis Kenrick; Henry Wace; John Wylie

10 November 1877	Remnants F.C.	4–0	St Stephen's F.C.	Aldin House, Slough
	Unknown

10 November 1877	Swifts F.C.	3–2	Leyton F.C.	Dolphin Ground, Slough
	William Bambridge; Short		William Rawson

10 November 1877	Upton Park F.C.	3–0	Rochester F.C.	West Ham Park, West Ham, London
	D. Hunter; J. Hunter

12 November 1877	Druids F.C.	1–0	Shropshire Wanderers F.C.	Plasmadoc Park, Ruabon, Wales
	Unknown

Barnes F.C.	w/o from	St Mark's F.C.

Old Foresters F.C.	w/o from	Old Wykehamists F.C.

Royal Engineers A.F.C.	w/o from	Highbury Union F.C.

Queen's Park F.C.	bye

=== Replays ===
9 November 1877	Ramblers F.C.	0–1	Pilgrims F.C.	Marsh Street, Walthamstow
			Redwood

1 December 1877	Sheffield F.C.	3–0	Notts County F.C.	Bramall Lane, Sheffield
	Arthur Cursham; Matthews			Referee: E. A. M. Smythe

== Second round ==
8 December 1877	Cambridge University A.F.C.	4–2	Maidenhead F.C.	Parker's Piece, Cambridge
	Jarvis; Steel; Styan; Wild		Mackie

8 December 1877	Upton Park F.C.	1–0	Reading F.C.	West Ham Park, West Ham, London
	Unknown

8 December 1877	Royal Engineers A.F.C.	6–0	Pilgrims F.C.	Chatham Lines, Chatham
	Robert Hedley; Unknown

15 December 1877	Barnes F.C.	3–1	Great Marlow F.C.	Barnes Green, Barnes, London
	Ainslie; Dorling		Unknown

15 December 1877	High Wycombe F.C.	0–9	Wanderers F.C.	The Rye, High Wycombe
			Henry Wace; Charles Wollaston; John Wylie; Charles Denton; Arthur Kinnaird; Unknown (o.g.)

15 December 1877	Oxford University A.F.C.	1–0	Old Foresters F.C.	The Parks, Oxford
	Unknown (o.g.)

22 December 1877	Old Harrovians A.F.C.	6–0	1st Surrey Rifles F.C.
	Herbert Bevington; Edward Prior; Colbeck; Hadow

22 December 1877	Clapham Rovers F.C.	4–0	Swifts F.C.	Wandsworth Common, Wandsworth, London
	Walter Buchanan; George Holden; Sedgwick

22 December 1877	Remnants F.C.	2–0	Hawks F.C.	Aldin House, Slough
	Lionel Keyser; Unknown

29 December 1877	Sheffield F.C.	1–0	Darwen F.C.	Bramall Lane, Sheffield
	Matthews

Druids F.C.	w/o from	Queen's Park F.C.

== Third round ==
12 January 1878	Wanderers F.C.	1–1	Barnes F.C.	The Oval, Kennington, London
	Charles Denton		Ainslie	Attendance: 500; Referee: Francis Marindin

19 January 1878	Upton Park F.C.	3–0	Remnants F.C.	West Ham Park, West Ham, London
	D. Hunter; J. Hunter; H. Williams

30 January 1878	Royal Engineers A.F.C.	8–0	Druids F.C.	Chatham Lines, Chatham
	Robert Hedley; Conyers Tower; Charles Haynes; Morgan Lindsay; Unknown

2 February 1878	Old Harrovians A.F.C.	2–2	Cambridge University A.F.C.	Harrow School Sports Centre, Harrow on the Hill
	Herbert Bevington; Richard Geaves		Hill; Styan

2 February 1878	Oxford University A.F.C.	3–2	Clapham Rovers F.C.	The Parks, Oxford
	Edward Heygate; Francis Otter; Edward Parry		Arthur Birkett; Stanley Rawson

Sheffield F.C.	bye

=== Replays ===
26 January 1878	Barnes F.C.	1–4	Wanderers F.C.	Barnes Green, Barnes, London
	Percy Weston		Arthur Kinnaird; Charles Wollaston; John Wylie; Unknown

9 February 1878	Cambridge University A.F.C.	2–2	Old Harrovians A.F.C.	Parker's Piece, Cambridge
	Hill; Styan		Colbeck; Harvey

16 February 1878	Old Harrovians A.F.C.	2–0	Cambridge University A.F.C.	The Oval, Kennington, London
	Lowis; Edward Prior

== Fourth round ==
15 February 1878	Royal Engineers A.F.C.	3–3	Oxford University A.F.C.	Chatham Lines, Chatham
	Unknown		Unknown

16 February 1878	Wanderers F.C.	3–0	Sheffield F.C.	The Oval, Kennington, London
	Henry Wace; John Wylie; Charles Denton			Attendance: 1000; Referee: Robert Ogilvie (Clapham Rovers F.C.)

9 March 1878	Old Harrovians A.F.C.	3–1	Upton Park F.C.	Harrow School Sports Centre, Harrow on the Hill
	Harry Betts; Colbeck		J. Hunter

=== Replays ===
27 February 1878	Oxford University A.F.C.	2–2	Royal Engineers A.F.C.	The Parks, Oxford
	Francis Otter		Frank Bond; Charles Haynes

12 March 1878	Royal Engineers A.F.C.	4–2	Oxford University A.F.C.	Chatham Lines, Chatham
	Horace Barnet; Frank Bond; Oliver Ruck; Pelham Burn		Francis Crowdy; John Elwell

== Semi-finals ==
16 March 1878	Royal Engineers A.F.C.	2–1	Old Harrovians A.F.C.	The Oval, Kennington, London
	Horace Barnet; George Mayne		Edward Prior

Wanderers F.C.	bye

== Final ==
23 March 1878

Wanderers F.C.	3–1	Royal Engineers A.F.C.
Jarvis Kenrick 5' 65'; Arthur Kinnaird 35'		William Morris 20'

The Oval, Kennington, London
Attendance: 4500
Referee: Segar Bastard (Upton Park F.C.)

== See also ==
- FA Cup
- FA Cup Final
