= 1878 FA Cup final =

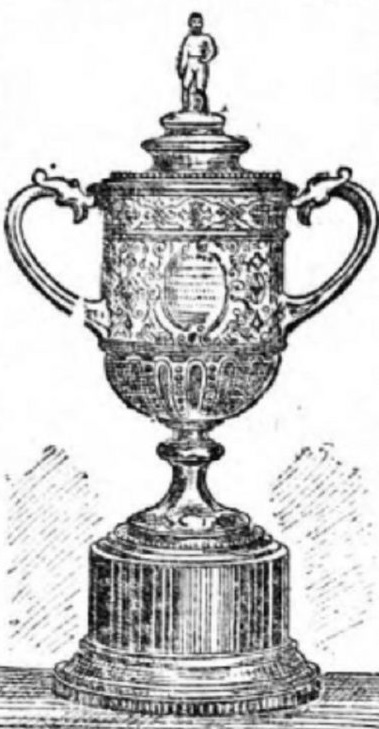
- An illustration of the FA Cup trophy awarded in 1878
- Event: 1877–78 FA Cup
Wanderers	Royal Engineers
3	1
- Date: 23 March 1878
- Venue: Kennington Oval, London
- Referee: Segar Bastard
- Attendance: 4,500

The 1878 FA Cup final was an association football match between Wanderers F.C. and Royal Engineers A.F.C. on 23 March 1878 at Kennington Oval in London. It was the seventh final of the world's oldest football competition, the Football Association Challenge Cup (commonly known in the modern era as the FA Cup). Wanderers had won the Cup in the previous two seasons and on four previous occasions in total, including the first FA Cup final in 1872, in which they defeated the Engineers. The Engineers had also won the Cup, having defeated Old Etonians in the 1875 final.

The Wanderers, who were considered firm favourites to win the Cup for the third consecutive season, took the lead after only five minutes through Jarvis Kenrick, but the Engineers quickly equalised. The Cup-holders regained their lead before half-time and added a third goal after the half-time interval to secure a 3–1 victory. Under the original rules of the competition, the Cup was retired and presented to the club on a permanent basis to mark their third consecutive win, but the Wanderers returned it to the Football Association on the condition that it never again be won outright by any club.

== Background ==
The Football Association Challenge Cup (commonly known in the modern era as the FA Cup) was the first formal competition created for the sport of association football, which had first been codified in 1863. The creation of the tournament had been proposed in 1871 by Charles W. Alcock, the secretary of the Football Association (the FA), who wrote that "it is desirable that a Challenge Cup should be established in connection with the Association, for which all clubs belonging to the Association should be invited to compete". His inspiration had been a similar competition between houses during his time as a pupil at Harrow School. The first FA Cup competition took place during the 1871–72 season and 15 clubs entered. Wanderers won the final, defeating Royal Engineers, and Alcock himself was the winning captain.

In the 1877–78 season, the Wanderers were the reigning Cup-holders, having defeated Oxford University in the 1877 final. In addition to their victory in 1872, the team had also won the Cup in 1873 and 1876. No other club had yet won the competition more than once. The Engineers had won the Cup in 1875. The members of the Wanderers club were wealthy gentlemen who had attended some of the leading English public schools, including Harrow and Eton College; the Engineers team consisted of officers from the Corps of Royal Engineers, a division of the British Army. At the time, the sport was strictly amateur and was dominated by teams from the upper classes. It was not until 1882 that a working-class team reached the FA Cup final.

== Route to the final ==
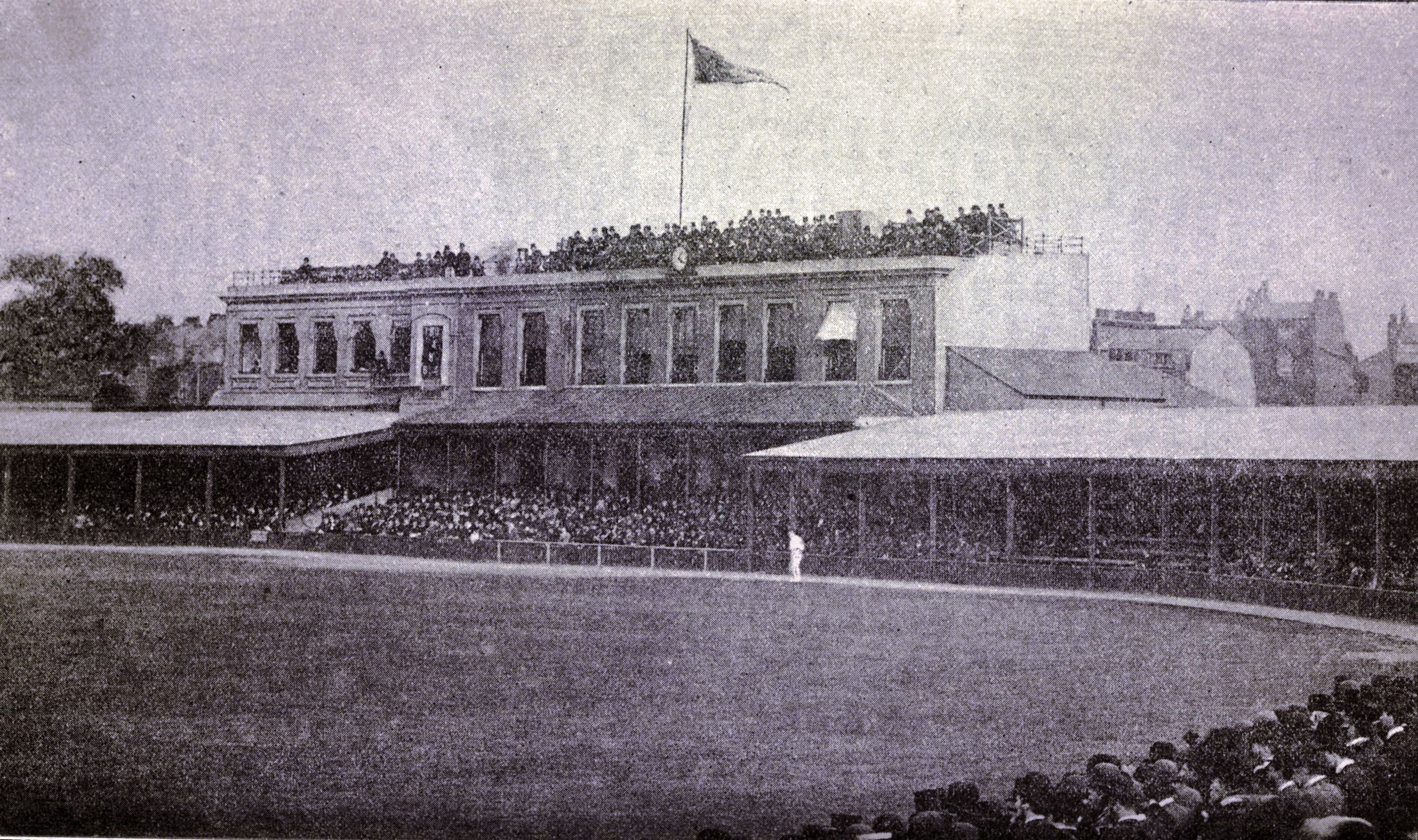
Kennington Oval (pictured in 1891) was the venue for the semi-final and final matches.

The 1877–78 FA Cup was contested by 43 clubs, all of which entered the competition at the first round stage. The Wanderers were allocated a home match against Panthers of Sturminster Newton in the first round and easily defeated their opponents 9–1, with Hubert Heron scoring four goals. In the second round they were paired with High Wycombe and again recorded a high-scoring victory, winning 9–0. The Wanderers were considered strong favourites to secure another victory when they faced Barnes in the third round, but the match ended in a 1–1 draw, necessitating a replay. Two weeks later, the Wanderers won the second match 4–1. In the quarter-finals the Wanderers defeated Sheffield 3–0 and then, with an uneven number of teams remaining in the competition, they received a bye into the final.

The Engineers' scheduled first round opponents were Union, but they withdrew from the competition, giving the Engineers a walkover victory. The "Sappers", as the Corps of Royal Engineers is traditionally nicknamed, went on to defeat Pilgrims 6–0 and Druids 8–0 in the second and third rounds respectively, with a hat-trick in both matches from Lieut. Robert Hedley. In the quarter-finals their opponents were the previous season's defeated finalists and the 1874 Cup-winners, Oxford University. The initial match finished in a 3–3 draw, and the replay also finished without a victor, ending 2–2. Finally, the Engineers emerged victorious in a second replay, winning 4–2. This set up a semi-final match against Old Harrovians, the team for former pupils of Harrow School. The match was played at Kennington Oval in south London and the Engineers reached the final by defeating the Harrovians 2–1.

== Match ==
=== Summary ===
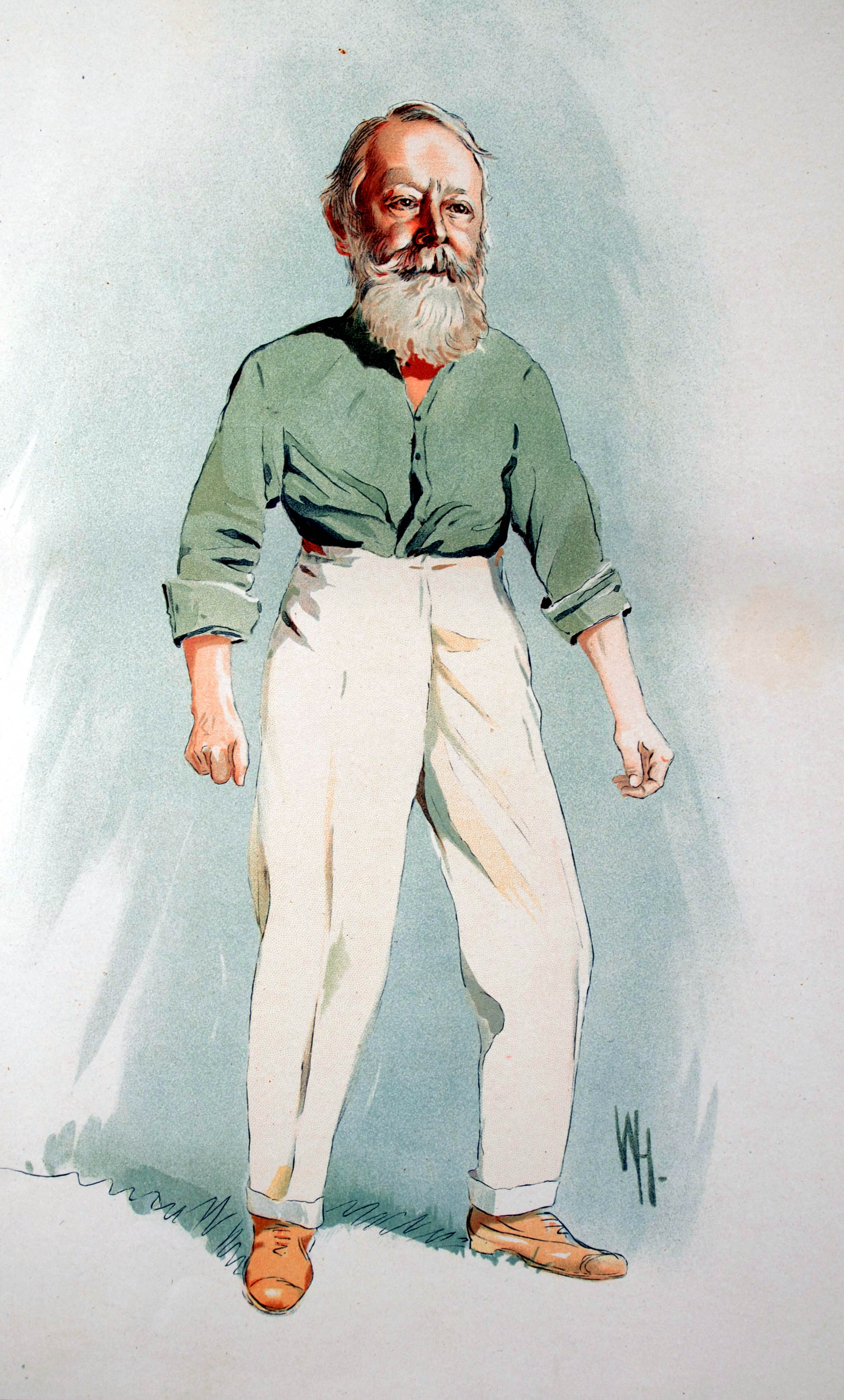
Hon. Arthur Kinnaird (illustration published in 1912) captained the Wanderers team.

Like the semi-final, the final was played at Kennington Oval. The match drew a crowd estimated at 4,500 spectators, the highest yet recorded for an FA Cup final. The referee was Segar Bastard of the Upton Park club. The umpires were C. Warner of Upton Park and B. Jarrett of Old Harrovians. Hedley was the team captain for the Engineers and Hon. Arthur Kinnaird for the Wanderers. Both teams played with two full-backs, two half-backs and six forwards. In the previous year's final, Kinnaird had been the Wanderers' goalkeeper, but on this occasion he played as a half-back; at the time the position of goalkeeper was not regarded as a specialised one and players often alternated between goalkeeping and playing in an outfield position. James Kirkpatrick played in goal for the Wanderers; having turned 37 the previous day he was the oldest player to appear in a Cup final up to that point. The only other change in the team's line-up from the previous year's final saw John Wylie replace Francis Birley. The Engineers' team did not include any players from their Cup-winning team of four years earlier, but did include Lieut. Oliver Ruck, whose brother Richard had played in that victory. The Wanderers, who were considered the firm favourites by the book-makers, won the pre-match coin toss and chose to defend the Harleyford Road end of the ground in the first half.

The Cup-holders immediately dominated the game and Kinnaird quickly had a shot on goal which was kept out by Lieut. William Morris with his head. After only five minutes Henry Wace crossed the ball from a wide position and Jarvis Kenrick kicked the ball past the Engineers' goalkeeper Lieut. Lovick Friend to give the Wanderers the lead. Immediately after falling behind, according to a report published in the Sheffield and Rotherham Independent, the Engineers "charged desperately on the opening goal" and their opponents "had rather a rough time of it". Approximately ten minutes after the opening goal, Kirkpatrick suffered a broken arm during a tussle on the goal-line, but he managed to keep the ball out of the goal and went on to play the remainder of the match despite his injury. Had he left the game, his team would not have been able to replace him as the concept of substitutes did not yet exist. In the 20th minute of the game, the Engineers' pressure paid off as they scored an equalising goal. Some modern sources state that Morris scored the goal, but contemporary newspaper reports state that Morris took a throw-in which led to a "scrimmage" (a contemporary term for a group of players all struggling to gain possession of the ball, now usually referred to as a "goalmouth scramble") in front of the Wanderers' goal, out of which the ball was forced over the goal-line, making the actual scorer of the goal unclear.

Towards the end of the first half, the Wanderers were awarded a free kick after a handball offence by the Engineers. Kinnaird took the kick, which led to a second goal for the Cup-holders. Modern sources list Kinnaird as the goalscorer, but some contemporary reports suggest that, following his free kick, another goalmouth scramble ensued in front of the Engineers' goal before the ball was forced over the line, again making the actual scorer unclear. Shortly before half-time, Charles Wollaston took a shot for the Wanderers but it went wide of the goal; at the break his team held a 2–1 lead. Shortly after the half-time interval, Hedley appeared to have brought the scores level once again, but the goal was disallowed due to an infringement of the offside rule. After around twenty minutes of the second period, Heron of Wanderers made a run down the left side of the pitch and crossed the ball into the centre; Morris missed the ball and Heron regained control of it and passed it to Kenrick, who scored his second goal of the game, giving the Wanderers a 3–1 lead. The Sheffield and Rotherham Independent report praised Heron for his performance in the second half, stating that his dribbling was "excellent". During the remainder of the game, the Engineers again made a number of attacks on the Wanderers' goal but their opponents were able to deal with them. The Sheffield and Rotherham Independent report stated that during the latter stages of the game "the only chance seemed to be of the Wanderers increasing their lead". Despite this, no further goals were scored and the final result was a 3–1 victory for Wanderers.

=== Details ===
23 March 1878

Wanderers	3–1	Royal Engineers
Kenrick 5', 65'; Kinnaird (unconfirmed) 35'		Morris (unconfirmed) 20'

Kennington Oval, London
Attendance: 4,500
Referee: Segar Bastard (Upton Park)

Wanderers	Royal Engineers

Wanderers:
GK	James Kirkpatrick
FB	Alfred Stratford
FB	William Lindsay
HB	Hon. Arthur Kinnaird (Captain)
HB	Frederick Green
FW	Charles Wollaston
FW	Hubert Heron
FW	John Wylie
FW	Henry Wace
FW	Charles Denton
FW	Jarvis Kenrick

Royal Engineers:
GK	Lieut. Lovick Friend
FB	Lieut. James Cowan
FB	Lieut. William Morris
HB	Lieut. Charles Mayne
HB	Lieut. Frederick Heath
FW	Lieut. Charles Haynes
FW	Lieut. Morgan Lindsay
FW	Lieut. Robert Hedley (Captain)
FW	Lieut. Francis Bond
FW	Lieut. Horace Barnet
FW	Lieut. Oliver Ruck

== Post-match ==
As was the norm until 1882, the winning team were not presented with the trophy at the stadium on the day of the match, but later in the year at their annual club dinner. Under the original rules of the competition, if a team won the Cup three times in succession, it would be retired and become their "absolute property". The Wanderers' committee, however, returned the Cup to the FA on the condition that the rule be removed and no other team permitted to win the Cup outright. As of 2024, the only other team to win the Cup in three successive seasons is Blackburn Rovers, who won it in 1884, 1885, and 1886. On that occasion the club was presented with a commemorative shield. The trophy which the Wanderers won in 1878 continued to be used until 1895, when it was stolen and never recovered; a new trophy of identical design was made to replace it.

Three weeks after the Cup final, the Wanderers played the winners of the 1877–78 Scottish Cup, Vale of Leven, at Kennington Oval. The match between the winners of England and Scotland's national football competitions generated significant interest, but the size of the crowd was impacted by very bad weather. In a game played in very poor conditions, the Wanderers were defeated 3–1. Neither the Wanderers or the Royal Engineers would appear in the final of the FA Cup again after 1878. Wanderers' fortunes declined rapidly, partly because many of the team's leading players opted to play instead for the clubs set up specifically for the former pupils of individual schools. The team last took part in the FA Cup in the 1879–80 season, and by the mid-1880s the Wanderers club had ceased to play matches altogether. The officers of the Royal Engineers continued to enter the FA Cup until 1883, after which the focus was instead placed on teams open to all ranks representing individual battalions within the corps; these teams took part in the FA Amateur Cup and army-specific competitions.
