= James Cowan (sport shooter) =

English soldier, footballer, and shooter

Personal information
- Full name: James Henry
- Date of birth: 28 September 1856
- Place of birth: Chiswick, London
- Date of death: 7 August 1943 (aged 86)
- Place of death: Linlithgow, Scotland
- Position: Full-back

Senior career*
Years	Team	Apps	(Gls)
1876–85	Royal Engineers		
- * Club domestic league appearances and goals

James Henry Cowan (28 September 1856 – 7 August 1943) was an Army officer, who played in the 1878 FA Cup final for the Royal Engineers A.F.C., and represented Great Britain in shooting at the 1908 Summer Olympics.

== Army career ==
Cowan was born in Chiswick, the son of a solicitor from Mid Calder, and was educated at Edinburgh Academy, Cheltenham College, and the Royal Military Academy, Sandhurst In 1875, he received the prize from the RMA for shooting in 1875, earning himself a breech-loading revolver; his fellow prize-winners included future football team-mates Charles Mayne, Horace Barnet, and Oliver Ruck. The following year, he passed out of Sandhurst with the highest mark in the year, his 40,117 marks being nearly 5,000 clear of the second student. He was recommended for - and accepted - a commission in the Royal Engineers.

He became an instructor in Fortifications at the RMA and was mentioned in dispatches for his service in the Boer War. In 1906–07, he commanded the Royal Engineers in Chatham and "rendered notable service" in the First World War as Assistant Director of Fortifications. By the time of his retirement, he had reached the rank of colonel.

== Football career ==
Although his school was not notable for association football, Cowan was chosen as a full-back soon after joining the Engineers, making his debut at the Kennington Oval in October 1876 in a defeat to the Wanderers. He made his competitive debut a fortnight later in the first round of the 1876–77 FA Cup, again at the Oval and again as a back, but this time in a victory, over the Old Harrovians.

He played in all of the Sappers' Cup ties that season and repeated the feat in 1877–78, but this time all the way to the final, one stage further than 1876–77. However, the Sappers lost 3–1 to the Wanderers in the final.

Cowan only played once in the 1878–79 FA Cup, in the second round at Oxford University; he was praised for his kicking, but the Sappers crashed 4–0. He was a regular in the 1879–80 competition and captained the side in the semi-final replay against Oxford University, but the Students once more beat the Sappers, with the only goal coming in the last ten minutes.

Cowan then stepped back from the football side, making a one-off comeback in the 1885–86 first round tie at home to the Old Foresters, but in a sign of how much the game had passed the Sappers by, the Foresters won 5–1, the second Forester goal being a deflection off Cowan.

== Shooting career ==
Cowan regularly shot for the Army at the Imperial Meeting and was captain of the Army Eights from 1908 to 1912. He also represented Scotland in the Elcho Shield on many occasions.

Cowan made his Bisley début at the age of 16 in 1872 (while still at school) and won the Spencer Cup. In 1935, he represented Cheltenham again at Bisley in the Veterans Match. His biggest individual success at Bisley was winning the Wantage Prize of £10 in 1897 for scoring 23 points on a disappearing target at 200 yards. Cowan was a former vice-president of the National Rifle Association and a member of committee of the Army Rifle Association.

Cowan took part in the Running Deer - Individual Competition at the 1908 Summer Olympics, finishing 6th in the single shot (with 21 points out of a possible 40) and 8th in the double shot (with 24 points out of a possible 80).

== Personal life ==
He married when he was based in Kent in April 1880. In the early 1920s, Cowan moved to Moffat and served on the town council from 1930 to 1933. He lived his final years in Linlithgow and died in Moffat in 1943.
