= Charles Mayne =

English soldier and footballer

Personal information
- Full name: Charles Blair Mayne
- Date of birth: 15 October 1855
- Place of birth: Madras, British India
- Date of death: 17 October 1914 (aged 59)
- Place of death: Camberley, Surrey, England
- Position: Half-back

Senior career*
Years	Team	Apps	(Gls)
1875–84	Royal Engineers		
- * Club domestic league appearances and goals

Colonel Charles Blair Mayne (15 October 1855 – 17 October 1914) was an association footballer and British Army officer who played in the 1878 FA Cup final.

== Early life ==
Mayne was born in Madras, British India, in 1855, the son of Jasper and Amelia Mayne.

He passed the examinations for the Royal Military Academy, Woolwich in 1873, scoring the 12th highest mark - his future football team-mate Charles Haynes scored the 3rd highest.

== Football career ==
He joined the Royal Engineers, which had one of the strongest football teams at the time, and made his debut for the Royal Engineers A.F.C. in a 7–0 win over Barnes at the Chatham Lines in October 1875; the match was played 10-a-side.

He was mostly a reserve player for his first two seasons of football, and did not play competitively until the 2nd round of the 1877–78 FA Cup, in a 5–0 win over Pilgrims. He had generally played as a forward, but in the third round tie against the Druids, he had a one-off appearance in goal. He had little to do as the Sappers had an easy 8–0 win, and in his next appearance - the quarter-final replay with Oxford University – he played as half-back, scoring the Sappers' equalizer in a 2–2 draw after the ball came out of a scrimmage.

He retained the position for the remaining Cup games, and scored the winner in the semi-final against the Old Harrovians with a "well-directed kick". He was considered one of the Sappers' better players in the final against the Wanderers, but ended up on the losing side, the Wanderers winning 3–1.

His posting abroad prevented him from playing in any more competitive matches until 1882–83, and he featured as half-back (alongside Richard Ruck) in the Sappers' 3–1 win over Woodford Bridge for his only Cup match that season. His final recorded match was as a full-back in the Sappers' final FA Cup tie, at Great Marlow in November 1884, which, in an indication of how football had moved on, ended 10–1 to the home side.

== Army career ==
He took part in the Second Anglo-Afghan War in 1878–80. After his active service was over, he became an army instructor; originally at the School of Military Engineering, and then becoming a professor at the Royal Military College of Canada in 1886, before returning to England to be the Assistant Inspector-General of Fortifications. He returned to India from 1897 to 1899. In February 1903 he was again appointed Assistant Inspector-General of Fortifications at Head quarters.

He also undertook duties as a lay preacher, and retired with the rank of Colonel in 1907. He was an authority on field artillery, writing books such as Infantry Fire Tactics and Infantry Weapons And Their Use In War.

== Personal life ==
He married Victoria Moore in Frontenac, Ontario, Canada, on 6 April 1893.

Mayne died on 17 October 1914, in Camberley, Surrey, leaving his estate to his widow. The couple had two sons, both of whom were killed in the First World War; Jasper Mayne (of the Royal Field Artillery) in March 1915 and Victor Charles Moore Mayne (of the South Wales Borderers) in February 1916. Their daughter Grace however lived until 1991.
