= 1907 Birthday Honours =

National awards given by King Edward VII

The 1907 Birthday Honours for the British Empire were announced on 28 June, to celebrate the birthday of Edward VII.

The recipients of honours are displayed here as they were styled before their new honour, and arranged by honour, with classes (Knight, Knight Grand Cross, etc.) and then divisions (Military, Civil, etc.) as appropriate.

== The Most Honourable Order of the Bath ==
=== Knight Grand Cross of the Order of the Bath (GCB) ===
Military Division

- General Sir George Benjamin Wolseley, K.C.B.
- General The Honourable Sir Neville Gerald Lyttelton, K.C.B., Chief of the General Staff (1st Military Member, Army Council).

Civil Division

=== Knight Commander of the Order of the Bath (KCB) ===
Military Division

- Vice-Admiral Sir Wilmot Hawksworth Fawkes, K.C.V.O.
- Vice-Admiral Reginald Friend Hannam Henderson, C.B.
- Inspector-General Herbert Mackay Ellis, Honorary Physician to The King.
- Major-General The Honourable Savage Mostyn, C.B., Colonel, The Devonshire Regiment.
- Major-General Arthur Frederick Warren, C.B., Colonel Commandant, The Rifle Brigade (The Prince Consort's Own).
- Major-General Frederick Richard Solly-Flood, C.B., Colonel, The Prince of Wales's Volunteers (South Lancashire Regiment).
- Major-General Wilsone Black, C.B.
- Major-General John Ramsay Slade, C.B., Royal Artillery.
- Colonel Alexander Brooke Morgan, C.B.
- Major-General Edmund Leach, C.B., Colonel, The Queen's Own (Royal West Kent Regiment).
- Colonel Alfred Robert Davidson Mackenzie, C.B., Indian Army.
- Major-General Matthew William Edward Gosset, C.B., Colonel, The Dorsetshire Regiment.
- Colonel Charles John Oswald FitzGerald, C.B., Indian Army.
- Major-General John Gatacre, C.B., Indian Army.
- Lieutenant-General Arthur Singleton Wynne, C.B., Military Secretary to the Secretary of State for War, and Secretary, Selection Board.
- Lieutenant-General Sir Beauchamp Duff, K.C.V.O., C.B., C.I.E., Indian Army (Colonel, 9th Gurkha Rifles), Chief of the Staff, India.
- Lieutenant-General Charles Whittingham Horsley Douglas, C.B, Adjutant-General to the Forces (2nd Military Member, Army Council).

Civil Division

- Walter Jack Howell, Esq., C.B.
- Professor Edwin Ray Lankester, LL.D., F.R.S.
- Robert Laurie Morant, Esq., C.B.
- Charles Inigo Thomas, Esq., C.B.
- Richmond Thackeray Willoughby Ritchie, Esq., C.B.

=== Companion of the Order of the Bath (CB) ===
Military Division

- Captain Herbert Goodenough King-Hall, D.S.O., R.N.
- Deputy Inspector-General Thomas Desmond Gimlette, R.N.
- Colonel Archibald Paris, R.M.A.
- Surgeon-General Francis Wollaston Trevor, Army Medical Service, Principal Medical Officer, Western Command, India.
- Major-General Sir James Willcocks, K.C.M.G., D.S.O.
- Colonel James Melville Babington, C.M.G., half-pay.
- Colonel (Brigadier-General) Richard Menteith Greenfield, Brigade Commander, India.
- Colonel (Brigadier-General) Charles Edward Bradley, Brigadier-General, 12th Brigade, Eastern Command.
- Colonel (Brigadier-General) Charles Louis Woollcombe, Brigade Commander, India.
- Colonel (Brigadier-General) Fenton John Aylmer, V.C., Brigade Commander, India.
- Lieutenant-Colonel and Brevet Colonel Charles Hogge, Indian Army.
- Colonel Walter Rupert Kenyon-Slaney, half-pay.
- Colonel Henry Charles Harford, Colonel in Charge of Infantry Records, Yorkshire Grouped Regimental District.
- Colonel Ernest Blunt, Chief Engineer, Eastern Command, India.
- Lieutenant-Colonel and Brevet Colonel Frank Montagu Rundall, D.S.O., Indian Army.
- Colonel (Brigadier-General) Bertram Reveley Mitford, D.S.O., Brigadier-General 9th Brigade, Southern Command.
- Lieutenant-Colonel and Brevet Colonel Roderick William MacLeod, Indian Army.
- Colonel Edward Hogarth Molesworth, Indian Army, Brigade Commander, India.
- Colonel George Deane Bourke, Administrative Medical Officer, Southern Command.
- Colonel Arthur Henry Bagnold, Superintendent, Building Works, Ordnance Factories.
- Colonel (Brigadier-General) Thomas D'Oyly Snow, Brigadier-General, General Staff, Eastern Command.
- Colonel Alexander Bulstrode Fenton, Indian Army, Brigade Commander, India.
- Colonel Ellis Ramsay Reid, D.S.O., Army Pay Department, Chief Accountant, Western Command.
- Lieutenant-Colonel and Brevet Colonel Lewis Montgomery Murray Hall, Indian Army, Brigade Commander, India.
- Colonel James Archibald Ferrier, D.S.O., Chief Engineer, Coast Defences, Eastern Command.
- Lieutenant-Colonel and Brevet Colonel Laurence Julius Elliott Bradshaw, Indian Army, Brigade Commander, India.
- Colonel Harry Finn, half-pay.
- Lieutenant-Colonel and Brevet Colonel Edmund Walter St. George Welchman, Indian Army.
- Colonel Thomas John O'Dell, C.M.G., assistant director of Supplies and Transport, Irish Command.
- Colonel (temporary- Major-General) Reginald Henry Mahon, Director-General of Ordnance, India.
- Lieutenant-Colonel and Brevet Colonel Alexander Hamilton Gordon, General. Staff Officer, First Grade, Headquarters of Army.
- Lieutenant-Colonel and Brevet Colonel Laurence George Drummond, M.V.O., Scots Guards.
- Colonel Francis John Davies, Assistant Quartermaster-General, Western Command.
- Colonel George Kenneth Scott-Moncrieff, C.I.E., assistant director of Fortifications and Works, Headquarters of Army.
- Colonel Charles Edward Callwell, General Staff Officer, 1st Grade, Headquarters of Army.
- Colonel George James Butcher, C.M.G., Army Ordnance Department, assistant director of Ordnance Stores, Irish Command.
- Colonel Charles Henry Beatson. Indian Medical Service.

Civil Division

- Dr. James Alfred Ewing, F.R.S.
- Engineer Rear-Admiral John Thomas Corner.
- Thomas Cave-Browne-Cave, Esq.
- The Rev. William Spotswood Green, M.A.
- Frederick Arthur Hirtzel, Esq.
- Charles Albert King, Esq.
- Arthur William Nicholson, Esq.
- Angus Sutherland, Esq.
- Captain Jocelyn Home Thomson.

The following honours were gazetted at the same time, but were described as marking the 50th anniversary of Military Operations in India, 1857

- Admiral Henry Rushworth Wratislaw.
- Rear-Admiral The Honourable Victor Alexander Montagu.
- Paymaster-in-Chief Thomas Henry Lovelace Bowling, R.N.
- General Henry Nicoll, Indian Army.
- General Harry Cortlandt Anderson, Indian Army.
- General Sir William Stirling-Hamilton, Bart., Colonel - Commandant, Royal (late Bengal) Artillery.
- Lieutenant-General John Pringle Sherriff, Indian Army, Colonel, 6th Gurkha Rifles.
- Major-General Frederick Hardy, Colonel, the York and Lancaster Regiment.
- Major-General and Honorary Lieutenant-General James John McLeod Innes, V.C., Royal (late Bengal) Engineers (Retired).
- Major-General Henry Cook.
- Surgeon-General Thomas Tarrant, K.H.P., Retired Pay, late Army Medical Staff.
- Major-General Francis Edward Archibald Chamier, C.I.E., Indian Army.
- Major-General Robert Charles Boileau Pemberton, C.S.I., Royal (late Bengal) Engineers (Retired).
- Colonel and Honorary Major-General John Edward Swindley; Retired Pay, late 15th Hussars.
- Colonel and Honorary Major-General Henry Thomas Arbuthnot, Retired Pay, late Royal Artillery.
- Colonel and Honorary Major-General Walter Tuckfield Goldsworthy, Retired Pay, late Essex Regiment.
- Colonel and Honorary Major-General Charles Stuart Lane, Indian Army (Retired).
- Colonel Charles Edward Torriano, Retired Pay, late Royal Artillery.
- Lieutenant-Colonel and Colonel Frederick Lockwood Edridge, Retired Pay, late Lancashire Fusiliers.
- Lieutenant-Colonel and Colonel Falkland George Edgeworth Warren, C.M.G., Retired Pay, late Royal Artillery.
- Deputy Surgeon-General Edward Malcolm Sinclair, Retired Pay, late Army Medical Staff.
- Colonel and Honorary Major-General Apsley Cherry-Garrard, Retired Pay, late Scottish Rifles.
- Colonel and Honorary Major-General George Balfour Traill, Royal (late Bengal) Artillery (Retired).
- Colonel and Honorary Major-General Minto Elliot, Royal (late Bengal) Artillery (Retired).
- Lieutenant-Colonel and Colonel Peter Edward Hill, Retired Pay, late Royal Artillery.
- Colonel and Honorary Major-General Arthur Kennedy Rideout, Retired Pay, late Royal Artillery.
- Deputy Surgeon-General Alfred Eteson, Indian Medical Service (Retired).
- Lieutenant-Colonel and Brevet Colonel Thomas Cadell, V.C., Indian Army.
- Colonel and Honorary Major-General John James Silverston O'Neill, Retired Pay, late Lancashire Fusiliers.
- Lieutenant-Colonel and Colonel John Greenlaw Forbes, Royal (late Bengal) Engineers (Retired).
- Lieutenant-Colonel and Colonel George Ludlow Kennedy Hewett, Indian Army (Retired).
- Lieutenant-Colonel and Brevet Colonel Percy William Powlett, C.S.I., Indian Army.
- Lieutenant-Colonel and Colonel Samuel George Huskisson, Retired Pay, late Middlesex Regiment.
- Lieutenant-Colonel and Brevet Colonel Henry John Nuthall, Indian Army (Retired).
- Lieutenant-Colonel and Colonel Edward Everett, D.S.O, Retired Pay, late Cameron Highlanders.
- Colonel William George Small, Retired Pay, late Army Pay Department.
- Lieutenant-Colonel and Honorary Colonel Edward Ham Langmore, Indian Army (Retired).

== Order of the Star of India ==
=== Knight Commander of the Order of the Star of India (KCSI) ===
- Thomas William Holderness, Esquire, C.S.I., Indian Civil Service (retired), Secretary in the Revenue and Statistics Department of the India Office.
- Lancelot Hare, Esquire, C.S.I., C.I.E., Indian Civil Service, Lieutenant-Governor of Eastern Bengal and Assam.

=== Companion of the Order of the Star of India (CSI) ===
- Raja Narendra Chand of Nadaun, Kangra District, Punjab.
- Arthur Delaval Younghusband, Esquire, Indian Civil Service, Commissioner in Sind.
- Oscar Theodore Barrow, Esquire, Indian Civil Service, Comptroller and Auditor-General.
- Henry Zouch Darrah, Esquire, Indian Civil Service, Commissioner, United Provinces.
- Colonel Howard Goad, Indian Army, Honorary Aide-de-Camp to the Viceroy, Director General, Army Remount Department.

== Order of Saint Michael and Saint George ==
=== Knight Grand Cross of the Order of St Michael and St George (GCMG) ===
- Sir William MacGregor, M.D., K.C.M.G., C.B., Governor and Commander-in-Chief of the Colony of Newfoundland.
- Major Sir Hamilton John Goold-Adams, K.C.M.G., C.B., Governor and Commander-in-Chief of the Orange River Colony.

=== Knight Commander of the Order of St Michael and St George (KCMG) ===
- Sydney Olivier, Esq., C.M.G., Captain-General and Governor-in-Chief of the Island of Jamaica.
- The Honourable Charles Fitzpatrick, Chief Justice of Canada, and Administrator of the Government in the absence of the Governor-General.
- Colonel William George Morris, late R.E., C.B., C.M.G., in recognition of services as Superintendent of the Trigonometrical Survey of the Transvaal and Orange River Colonies.
- Colonel Duncan McKenzie, C.B., C.M.G., Officer Commanding, Natal Carbineers, in recognition of services in connection with the Native Disturbances in the Colony of Natal, in 1906.
- Gerard Augustus Lowther, Esq., C.B., Envoy Extraordinary and Minister Plenipotentiary to His Imperial Majesty the Sultan of Morocco, and Consul-General in Morocco.
- Adam Samuel James Block, Esq., C.M.G., Representative of British and Dutch Bondholders on the Council of the Ottoman Debt.
- Saba Pasha, on his retirement from the post of Postmaster-General in Egypt. (Honorary)

=== Companion of the Order of St Michael and St George (CMG) ===
- James Jamieson Thorburn, Esq., Lieutenant-Governor and Colonial Secretary of the Colony of Southern Nigeria.
- The Honourable James Stewart Pitts, Member of the Executive and Legislative Councils of the Island of Newfoundland.
- Captain Robert Hamilton Anstruther, R.N., Senior Naval Officer in Newfoundland Waters.
- Harry Newton Phillips Wollaston, Esq., LL.D., I.S.O., Comptroller-General, Department of Trade and Customs of the Commonwealth of Australia.
- The Honourable John Henry, of Hobart, Tasmania; in recognition of services to the Commonwealth of Australia.
- Alfred Duclos De Celles, Esq., LL.D., General Librarian of Parliament, Dominion of Canada.
- Martin Joseph Griffin, Esq., LL.D., Parliamentary Librarian, Dominion of Canada.
- Herbert James Read, Esq., of the Colonial Office.
- William Chatham, Esq., Director of Public Works of the Colony of Hong Kong.
- Major (local Colonel) Stephen Lushington, R.A., Inspector-General of Police and Inspector of Prisons of the Colony of British Guiana, and Commandant of the British Guiana Militia.
- Lieutenant-Colonel William Frank Barker, D.S.O., Officer Commanding, South African Light Horse; in recognition of services in connection with the Native Disturbances in the Colony of Natal, in 1906.
- William Edward Armbrister, Esq., Member of the Executive Council and President of the Legislative Council of the Bahama Islands.
- Frederick James Clarke, Esq., Member of the Executive Council and Speaker of the House of Assembly of the Island of Barbados.
- Stephen Salisbury Bagge, Esq., Provincial Commissioner in the East Africa Protectorate; in recognition of services as Chief Political Officer, Nandi Field Force.
- Major (Honorary Lieutenant - Colonel) the Honourable Henry Dundas Napier, Indian Army, late Military Attache to His Majesty's Embassy at St. Petersburg.
- William Edwin Brunyate, Esq., Barrister-at-Law, Khedivial Counsellor, Ministry of Justice, Egypt.
- Tungku Mahmud bin Sultan Ahmad, the Tungku Besar of Pahang. (Honorary)
- Admiral Chikakata Tamari, Imperial Japanese Navy, late Naval Attache to the Imperial Japanese Embassy in London.(Honorary)

== Order of the Indian Empire ==
=== Knight Grand Commander of the Order of the Indian Empire (GCIE) ===
- Major His Highness Maharao Sir Umed Singh Bahadur, K.C.S.I., of Kota.

=== Knight Commander of the Order of the Indian Empire (KCIE) ===
- Nawab Mumtaz-ud-Daula Muhammad Faiyaz Ali Khan, C.S.I., of Pahasu.

=== Companion of the Order of the Indian Empire (CIE) ===
- Doctor Jean Etienne Justin Schneider, Principal Doctor of First Class, French Army, late Chief Doctor to the Shah and President of the Sanitary Council of Persia. (Honorary)
- John Stratheden Campbell, Esquire, Indian Civil Service, Commissioner of the Kumaon Division, United Provinces.
- Frederick Palmer, Esquire, Chief Engineer, Port Commissioners, Calcutta.
- Nawab Bahrain Khan, Chief of the Mazari Tribe, of the Dera Ghazi Khan District, Punjab.
- Shrimant Anand Rao Gaekwar, lately Senapati, Baroda State.
- Thomas Henry Stillingfleet Biddulph, Esquire, Accountant-General, Patiala State.
- Surgeon-Lieutenant-Colonel Warren Roland Crooke-Lawless, M.D., Coldstream Guards, Surgeon to His Excellency the Viceroy.
- Lieutenant-Colonel Alexander John Maunsel MacLaughlin, V.D., Honorary Aide-de-Camp to His Excellency the Commander-in-Chief in India and Commandant of the Surma Valley Light Horse.
- George Claudius Beresford Stirling, Esquire, Superintendent of the Northern Shan States.
- Francis St. George Manners-Smith, Esquire, Superintending Engineer for Protective Irrigation Works in Rajputana.
- Major David Melville Babington, Royal Artillery, Superintendent, Cordite Factory, Wellington.
- Chinubhai Madhavlal of Ahmedabad.
- Samuel Digby, Esquire, Secretary, Indian Section, Society of Arts.

== Royal Victorian Order ==
=== Knight Commander of the Royal Victorian Order (KCVO) ===
- Lieutenant-General Douglas Mackinnon Baillie Hamilton, Earl of Dundonald, C.V.O., C.B., Colonel, 2nd Life Guards.
- Sir Thomas George Shaughnessy, President of the Canadian Pacific Railway Company.
- Colonel Douglas Frederick Rawdon Dawson, C.V.O., C.M.G., Comptroller in the Lord Chamberlain's Department.

=== Commander of the Royal Victorian Order (CVO) ===
- Lieutenant-Colonel Sir William Hutt Curzon Wyllie, K.C.I.E., M.V.O., Political Aide-de-Camp to the Secretary of State for India.
- Sir Henry Arthur White, Solicitor to His Majesty The King.
- Sir Hugh Montagu Allan, Director of the Allan Steamship Company.
- Eustace Neville-Rolfe, Esq., M.V.O., His Majesty's Consul-General at Naples.

=== Member of the Royal Victorian Order, 4th class ===
- The Honourable John William Fortescue, Librarian to His Majesty The King at Windsor Castle.
- The Honourable Richard Charles Moreton, Marshal of the Ceremonies to His Majesty The King.
- Charles John Cleland, Esq., D.L.
- Commander St Vincent Nepean (Royal Navy, retired), Chief Inspector of Life Boats, Royal National Lifeboat Institution.

== Distinguished Service Order (DSO) ==
- Colonel Hilmer Theodore Bru-de-Wold, C.M.G., Commandant Local Forces, Natal.
- Lieutenant-Colonel and Brevet Colonel George Leuchars, C.M.G., Umvoti Mounted Rifles.

== Imperial Service Order ==
- William James David Ansell, Esq., Collector of Customs, Larnaca, Cyprus.
- James Burns, Esq., Accountant-General of the Transvaal.
- Frederick William Collier, Esq., late Postmaster-General of the Colony of British Guiana.
- Thomas William Connah, Esq., Under Secretary, Treasury Department, State of Queensland.
- Hanson Werry Fraser, Esq., Financial Department, Foreign Office.
- Charles Edward Fryer, Esq., Superintending Inspector, Board of Agriculture and Fisheries.
- John Gardiner, Esq., a Public Service Inspector of the Commonwealth of Australia.
- Richard William Harwin, Esq., Chief Accountant, Natal Government Railways.
- William Hoskins, Esq., Comptroller of Accounts and Stores, Prison Commission.
- Charles Jordan, Esq., F.R.H.S, Superintendent of St. James's, Green, and Hyde Parks and Kensington Gardens.
- John Langford, Esq., late Registrar of the Supreme Court and Curator'of Intestate and Vacant Estates, Colony of Fiji.
- John MacDonald, Esq., Collector of Inland Revenue, Edinburgh.
- Edward Hyde East Maclaverty, Esq., late Senior Collector of Revenue, Jamaica.
- Alfred Meusah, Esq., Sub-Assistant Treasurer, Gold Coast Colony.
- Charles Eustace Pillans, Esq., Horticultural Assistant, Department of Agriculture, Colony of the Cape of Good Hope.
- Edward Roberts, Esq., late Chief Assistant to Superintendent of Nautical Almanac Office.
- John Soulsby Rowell, Esq., Ex-Vice-Consul, Havre., '
- Edward Joseph Ryan, Esq., Finance Clerk, Metropolitan Police, Ireland.
- Peter Samson Esq., Marine Engineer Surveyor-in-Chief, Board of Trade.
- Alfred Reid Venning, Esq., Federal Secretary, Federated Malay States.
- John Lewis Vincent, Esq., Late Chief Clerk, Judge Advocate General's Office.
- Montague Webb, Esq., Senior Staff Clerk, Board of Education.
- H. Bantry White, Esq., M.A., Chief. Clerk, Department of Agriculture, Ireland.
- James Wilson, Esq., late Postmaster, Leeds.
