= Southill Park F.C. =

Southill Park
- Full name: Southill Park Football Club
- Nickname: the Parkites
- Founded: 1876
- Dissolved: 1879
- Ground: Leaf Lane
- Secretary: Leslie Edwards, J. Acton Southern
Home colours

Southill Park F.C. was an English association football club, originally from Hampstead in London.

== History ==
The club was founded in 1876. The club seemed to have links with players from the north and Midlands, as amongst its founding players were C.E.O. Garrard and M. E. Dovaston, who had learned the game at Derby School (Dovaston had also played for the Highbury Union F.C.), the brothers J., D., and M. Wylie, who had played for Shrewsbury School, and J. E. Denning, who had played for Shropshire Wanderers, and whose brothers were also players for Southill Park. Other players with experience included W. E. Fishbourne from the First Surrey Rifles club.

It had 20 members in its first full season, but proved to be active, taking part in 23 matches, winning 16 and only losing 1, its sole defeat coming against the Pilgrims. Its earliest recorded match was a 2–0 win over the Ramblers F.C., although a club simply called "Park", which included the original Southill Park captain Mantle in its line-up, lost at the Mosquitoes club in February.

Perhaps as a result of this promising season, the club entered the FA Cup for the first time in 1877–78. The club was drawn away in the first round to a strong Cambridge University F.C. side, and, on the St John's College grounds, the club went down to a 4–1 defeat.

The club entered the competition for the second and last time in 1878–79. The club was matched with the Old Harrovians in the first round; the match took place at the Kennington Oval and the Parkites were overmatched, the score being 8–0 to the Chequers.

The club continued until the end of the 1878–79 season, the final match being a 7–1 defeat at Upton Park F.C. in March 1879, but no more is heard of the club afterwards; M. Dovaston moved to the original Hendon club and centre-forward M. Wylie was good enough to join Wanderers.

== Colours ==
The club's colours were a white shirt, blue knickers, and red stockings.

== Grounds ==
The club originally played at Hampstead, five minutes' walk from the station, although match reports through 1877 give the location as Clapton. By 1878 it had moved to Walthamstow, its dressing room at the Rose and Crown public house in Leaf Lane.

== Notable players ==
- Clopton Lloyd-Jones, later joined Clapham Rovers with whom he scored the only goal of the 1880 FA Cup Final. He had played with Southill Park in its two FA Cup ties, captaining the side in the latter.
- John Wylie, future international and Cup winner (1878) with Wanderers; played for the club in 1876–77, scoring 6 goals in a match against Mosquitoes and 7 against St Mary's College of Peckham
