= 1877–78 in English football =

Football in England
- Season: 1877–78

Men's football
- FA Cup: Wanderers

The 1877–78 English football season was the seventh season of competitive football in England.

== Overview ==
Wanderers became the first club to win the FA Cup three times in a row after beating Royal Engineers 3–1 in this season's final. It was the fifth time they had won the competition overall. They never won it again.

== International match ==
A disastrous day for England saw them trounced by Scotland seven goals to two.

== National team ==
Date	Venue	Score	England scorers	Scotland scorers
2 March 1878	Hampden Park, Glasgow	2–7	John Wylie (Wanderers) (65 mins) & Arthur Cursham (Notts County) (75 mins)	John McDougall(3), John McGregor, William Muir MacKinnon, Henry McNeil (2)

== Honours ==
Competition	Winner
FA Cup	Wanderers (5*)
Birmingham Senior Cup	Shrewsbury (1)
Sheffield Challenge Cup	The Wednesday (2*)
Staffordshire Senior Cup	Stoke (1)

Notes = Number in parentheses is the times that club has won that honour. * indicates new record for competition. The Shrewsbury club is not associated with Shrewsbury Town F.C. but an earlier club defunct by 1881.
