= Henry Wace =

Henry Wace may refer to:

- Henry Wace (priest) (1836–1924), principal of King's College London and Dean of Canterbury
- Henry Wace (footballer) (1853–1947), Wanderers and England international footballer
