= Ramblers F.C. (England) =

English association football club

Ramblers
- Full name: Ramblers Football Club
- Founded: 1874
- Dissolved: 1879
- Ground: Marsh Street, Walthamstow
- Secretary: 1875: T. B. Fairbairns, 1876 onwards: T. Murray Ford
Home colours

Ramblers F.C. was an English association football club from London.

== History ==
The club was founded in 1874 as a spin-off of the Pilgrims side. Of the XI which started the first recorded Ramblers match, against Leyton F.C. in January 1875, 10 had played for Pilgrims in 1873–74, and, like the Pilgrims, the club limited playing membership to 60 members. At a time when a player could be a member or player of more than one club simultaneously, many of the Ramblers players also continued to play for Pilgrims. The club's most notable player was E. H. Topham, picked out by Charles Alcock as an active half-back with a sure kick, and who played for the Old Foresters in the Cup against the Pilgrims in 1881.

The club entered the FA Cup for the first time in 1875–76, and was drawn to play Maidenhead away. As Pilgrims had entered the Cup as well, players had to choose which of the two sides to represent; those who had chosen Pilgrims travelled to the tie by train with the Ramblers' select. Most of the first-choice Ramblers players decided to play for Pilgrims, and replacement players were former pupils of the Forest School of nearby Walthamstow, as they had not yet formed an old boys' club; the home side won 2–0.

In 1876–77, the dilemma of whom to represent became more acute, as Pilgrims and Ramblers were drawn together in the first round of the FA Cup. Again the better players chose to play for Pilgrims, who won 4–1. Normally, each side would nominate an umpire for the match, but the two sides were so closely linked that they agreed to ask Charles Alcock to be the sole umpire.

The same tie came out of the hat the following year, this time the Pilgrims winning in a replay at the Ramblers' ground, and again Alcock acting as sole umpire.

The club entered the FA Cup a final time in 1878–79, losing to Romford in the first round. There is no record of the club playing after the 1878–79 season, with some players reverting to the Pilgrims, although it retained membership of the Football Association until 1882.

== Colours ==
The club's colours were dark red jerseys, dark blue knickers, and dark red stockings, originally with a dark red cap. In 1877, the club replaced the dark red with maroon, although in practice this may have been the same hue.

== Ground ==
The club's first ground was at Hackney Downs, and it based itself at the Princess Alexandra Inn in Nightingale Road. From its second season it had a private ground in Walthamstow, a five minute walk from St James' railway station, and used The Chequers on Marsh Street for facilities. In 1877 it found a new ground slightly nearer to the station by the Cock Tavern.
