= Henry Wace (footballer) =

English footballer and lawyer

Personal information
- Date of birth: 21 September 1853
- Place of birth: Shrewsbury, England
- Date of death: 5 November 1947 (aged 94)
- Position: Centre-forward

Senior career*
Years	Team	Apps	(Gls)
- Cambridge University
1871–1880	Wanderers	0	(0)
	Clapham Rovers	0	(0)
	Shropshire Wanderers	0	(0)

International career
1878–1879	England	3	(0)
- * Club domestic league appearances and goals

Henry Wace (21 September 1853 – 5 November 1947) was an English amateur footballer who made three appearances for England and played for Wanderers, with whom he won the FA Cup in 1877 and 1878. By profession he was a lawyer who specialised in bankruptcy law.

== Football career ==
Wace was born in Shrewsbury, and educated at Shrewsbury School and St. John's College, Cambridge. He won blues in both association football and rugby in 1874 and 1875.

In the 1875 Football Annual, Wace was described as "a very good and dangerous 'centre' (who) plays pluckily and sticks to the ball; at times (he) gets a little too far forward".

He made his debut for Wanderers on 18 March 1871, when aged only 17, in a 2–0 victory over the Forest Club, when he played as the twelfth man. It was until the 1876–77 season, however, that he became a regular member of the side and went on to make a total of 38 appearances at centre-forward scoring 18 goals, including a hat-trick against Gitanos on 15 November 1876.

In 1876–77, Wace played in all four matches in the FA Cup, when Wanderers reached the final for the second consecutive year (and the fourth since the competition was inaugurated in 1871), where they defeated Oxford University 2–1 in extra time.

The following year, Wace again appeared in all six FA Cup matches including scoring twice in each of the victories over Panthers and High Wycombe. In the final against the Royal Engineers, Wace and the team captain Arthur Kinnaird were soon creating problems for the Engineers' defence, resulting in an early goal when Jarvis Kenrick converted "an excellent pass" from Wace. The game finished 3–1 to the Wanderers who thus claimed the cup for the fifth time in the first seven years of the competition.

Three weeks prior to the 1878 FA Cup Final, Wace was one of seven débutantes selected for the friendly international against Scotland. Although the England selectors had fielded a side that they considered capable of defeating the Scots, the home side had other ideas and scored seven goals with a hat-trick from John McDougall and two goals each from Billy MacKinnon and Henry McNeil; England replied through John Wylie and Arthur Cursham. In the aftermath of this "humiliating" defeat, it became clear that England would have to change their style of play if they were to compete with the Scottish passing game which was far more productive than the English style which relied on dribbling.

Wace retained his place for the next international against Wales at the Kennington Oval on 18 January 1879. The match was played in a blizzard and both captains agreed to play halves of only 30 minutes each. This was the first match between the two countries – Wales had previously only played three international matches, all against Scotland, including a 9–0 defeat in March 1878. England's two goals came from débutantes, Herbert Whitfeld and Thomas Sorby, with William Davies scoring for Wales. According to the football historian, Philip Gibbons, "England were surprised by the level of skill shown by the Welsh team".

For the annual match against Scotland played at the Oval on 5 April 1879, Wace retained his place and was appointed captain. Once again, the England selectors made numerous changes with eight players making their debut. Apart from Wace, only Norman Bailey and Billy Mosforth had previous international experience. By half-time the Scots had taken a 4–1 lead, but England fought back to equalise. With eight minutes remaining, the Scots had the ball in the net but the "goal" was disallowed for offside; England promptly raced upfield with Charlie Bambridge scoring on his debut, to give England their first victory over the Scots since 1873 in what was considered to be "the most exciting England and Scotland game to date".

In February 1880, Wace scored the consolation goal in a 3–1 defeat by Old Etonians thus scoring Wanderers' final goal in the FA Cup. His final appearance came on 23 October 1880; shortly afterwards, the club was disbanded.

Later, he played for Clapham Rovers and Shropshire Wanderers.

=== International appearances ===
Wace made three appearances for England as follows:

Date	Venue	Opponent	Result	Goals	Competition	Notes
2 March 1878	Hampden Park (First), Glasgow	Scotland	2–7	0	Friendly	
18 January 1879	Kennington Oval, London	Wales	2–1	0	Friendly	Possible Captain; match lasted 60 minutes
5 April 1879	Kennington Oval, London	Scotland	5–4	0	Friendly	Captain

== Professional career ==
Wace qualified as a barrister and was called to the bar in 1879. He went on to become an authority on bankruptcy law, publishing in 1904 "The Law and Practice of Bankruptcy".

== Football honours ==
Wanderers

- FA Cup winners: 1877 and 1878

== Notes ==
A.Newspaper reports of the time conflict on who was the actual captain against Wales. Three reports, The Field, The Sportsman and Football Annual give the captaincy to Arthur Cursham, whilst The Times, Athletic News and Bell's Life, give it to Wace.
