= Albemarle Swepstone =

English footballer

Personal information
- Full name: Harry Albemarle Swepstone
- Date of birth: 14 January 1859
- Place of birth: Stepney, England
- Date of death: 7 May 1907 (aged 48)
- Place of death: Gray's Inn, Holborn, London, England
- Position: Goalkeeper

Senior career*
Years	Team	Apps	(Gls)
- Clapton
- Pilgrims
- Ramblers
- Corinthian
- Swifts

International career
1880–1883	England	6	(0)
- * Club domestic league appearances and goals

Harry Albemarle Swepstone (14 January 1859 – 7 May 1907) was an English international footballer, who played as a goalkeeper.

== Career ==
Born in Stepney, Swepstone played club football for Clapton, Pilgrims, Ramblers, Corinthian and Swifts.

He earned six caps for England between 1880 and 1883. Nicknamed the 'Little Pilgrim' by the press, Swepstone has the dubious distinction of conceding 18 goals in just six international matches as England goalkeeper, despite keeping two clean sheets, after making his debut in a 5–4 defeat to Scotland at Hampden Park.

Swepstone was a founder-member of the famous amateur team Corinthian, established in 1882, and is credited as suggesting the team's name.
