= Herbert Bevington =

English footballer

Personal information
- Full name: Herbert Shelley Bevington
- Date of birth: 15 December 1852
- Place of birth: Denmark Hill, London, England
- Date of death: 9 August 1926 (aged 73)
- Place of death: Streatham, London, England
- Position: Forward

Senior career*
Years	Team	Apps	(Gls)
1871–1875	Cambridge University		
1874–1879	Clapham Rovers		
1874–1878	Harrow Chequers/Old Harrovians		
1875–1876	Wanderers		
1877–1878	South Norwood		
- * Club domestic league appearances and goals

Herbert Shelley Bevington (15 December 1852 – 9 August 1926) was an English footballer who played for Clapham Rovers in the 1879 FA Cup final.

== Early life ==
Bevington was born in Denmark Hill, the younger of two children to Henry and Mary Ann Bevington; his mother's maiden name provided his middle name. He was educated at Harrow School, an early promoter of the association game, and went up to Trinity College, Cambridge as a pensioner in Michaelmas term in 1871; he took his Bachelor of Arts in 1875 and his Master of Arts in 1878.

He showed significant athletic prowess at university, representing his college in the quarter-mile in a university meeting in February 1872 and on the cricket pitch that summer.

== Football career ==
He first played for the Cambridge University A.F.C. in 1871, with his second match being against the Wanderers at the Kennington Oval. He received a Blue for his appearances for Cambridge, although he was unable to play in the first Varsity match against Oxford University in 1874; in the 1875 match, he officiated as referee.

By the time the university entered the FA Cup for the first time, in 1873–74, he had been made captain; he gave so much for the cause in the university's first FA Cup match - against South Norwood, also at the Oval - that he was knocked flat in one run on goal, and forced to leave the pitch, but "with great pluck" returned. In the second round, the Light Blues were drawn to face Clapham Rovers, and took the more experienced side to a draw, before losing 4–1 in the replay; Bevington made the Cambridge goal by backing up fellow Trinitarian Roberts.

The meeting with the Rovers proved beneficial for both the Hybrid Club and Bevington, as for the 1874–75 he was found in the Clapham cerise and grey, as well as making the occasional appearance for the Harrow Chequers. He scored his first competitive goal in the first round of the 1875–76 FA Cup – the opener in a 3–0 win over the Panthers, played at Winchester - and apart from the 1876–77 season, in which he seems not to have played at all, remained a fixture in the side until 1878. He also made guest appearances for the Wanderers in 1875–76, and for South Norwood and the Old Harrovians in 1877–78.

He did not play in the 1878–79 FA Cup at all, other than the final, in which he missed "an easy shot" just before half-time, which proved costly as opponents Old Etonians scored the only goal just after the hour. He did, however, play in many other high-profile matches, usually as a left-sided forward, including in a friendly against Rangers at the Oval in October 1878.

The Cup final seems to have been his final match, although he continued to officiate matches as a Clapham Rovers member, and also officiated at the Rovers' athletic sports.

=== Representative football ===
He came close to representing England against Scotland twice. In 1876 he was a reserve for a match which England lost 3–0, and in 1878 he took part in an international trial match, albeit playing for the Improbables XIV against the Probables XII at the Kennington Oval. He represented the London Football Association in the "mini-international" against the Sheffield Football Association in 1876 at Bramall Lane, but the visitors were turned over 6–0, despite Bevington's "effective service".

== Post-football and personal life ==
Bevington married Seraphine Jonghmans (the daughter of a professor of music) at Holy Trinity Church in Brompton on 28 March 1883. They had a daughter (Vera) and a son (Reginald).

In common with many of the Clapham Rovers, Bevington was from the middle class. He became a partner (with his uncle Samuel) in the family firm of Bevington and Morris, a fur and leather trading company, based at Cannon Street, and his household ran an average of four servants from 1891 to 1911. By 1924 the partnership consisted of Herbert and his son Reginald.

He lived his later life in Clapham Common, but happened to be in a house in Streatham when he died, on 9 August 1926.
