= Muhammad Faiz Ali Khan =

Indian politician (1821–1894)

Nawab Sir Muhammad Faiz Ali Khan Bahadur, KCSI (26 August 1821 – 5 August 1894) was the Nawab of Pahasu, also a politician and administrator, who served as Prime Minister of Jaipur State, India.

== Early life ==
Nawab Sir Muhammad Faiz Ali Khan Khan KCSI, was a scion of the Muslim Rajput community of Lalkhani (Badgujar Rajput) lineage. He was born to Murad Ali Khan.

== Relations with the British ==
He and his father both served in the Jaipur Armed Forces and served the British well in the Indian Mutiny of 1857. He was rewarded for his loyalty with a large estate and the title of Khan Bahadur.

== Prime Minister of Jaipur State ==
He served as Prime Minister of Jaipur State in 1863 during the reign of Sawai Ram Singh II and was also given a jagir in Jaipur State for his services.

== Positions ==
He was an active member in public life and was:

- Member of the Legislative Council of the United Provinces
- Member of Governors General's Legislative Council

== Honours ==
- 1871: Companion of the Order of the Star of India and later elevated to
- 1876: Knight Commander of the Order of the Star of India.
- He was also given the titles of Khan Badaur and Mumtaz-ud-Daula.

== Estate ==
He was the jagirdar of Pahasu with the title of Nawab of Pahasu. Also held jagir in Jaipur State located at Tazami. He also held one village in the Sadabad Estate.

== Successor ==
He was succeeded by his able son Sir Muhammad Faiyaz Ali Khan, as Nawab of Pahasu.
