= William George Morris =

British army officer and footballer

Colonel Sir William George Morris KCMG, CB (12 February 1847 – 26 February 1935) was a British Army officer who served with the Royal Engineers in the 19th and early 20th centuries, observing the 1882 transit of Venus and developing an expertise in geodesic surveying. He also played football as an amateur for the Royal Engineers, appearing in the 1878 FA Cup Final.

== Family and education ==
Morris was born on 12 February 1847 at Malagaum Camp, near Kumta in the Bombay Presidency, India where his father, William John Morris (1809–1870) was a lieutenant-colonel in the Bombay Army. His mother was Georgiana née Cunningham (1824–1900).

Morris was educated at Cheltenham College, before joining the Royal Military Academy, Woolwich.

== Football career ==
Morris played football for both Cheltenham College and the Royal Military Academy, before joining the Royal Engineers in 1867. Although Morris is mentioned in a report on a match in December 1868 ("Lieut. Morris got off and dribbling the ball quite round his opponents, brought it in front of the goal and a kick from Lieut Dorward scored the first goal for the Royal Engineers" and "for the Engineers Lieut Morris ...(was) particularly conspicuous"), he was not a member of any of the regiment's teams which reached the FA Cup Finals in 1872 and 1874 and won the trophy in 1875.

By the time of the 1878 FA Cup Final, Morris was "approaching the veteran stage", being aged 31. The cup final was played at Kennington Oval on 23 March 1878, against the Wanderers, who had won the cup in the two previous seasons, with Morris selected at full-back. The Wanderers took an early lead through Jarvis Kenrick, before the Engineers gradually came back into the match. In the 20th minute, the ball went out of play close to the Wanderers' goal-line. Morris took the ensuing throw-in, delivering the ball into the goalmouth, from where it was bundled across the line for an equalising goal. Some modern sources state that Morris actually scored the goal, although contemporary newspaper reports in The Field, The Sporting Life and Bell's Life in London all state that Morris took the throw-in which led to a "scrimmage" or "bully" in front of the Wanderers' goal. Although the "Sappers" continued to put up a hard fight, they were unable to prevent the Wanderers scoring twice more, thus winning their third consecutive FA Cup with a final score of 3–1.

== Military career ==
Morris was commissioned as a lieutenant in the Royal Engineers on 10 July 1867, spending his early years training at Chatham and Aldershot. On 21 October 1871, he was sent to Mauritius, in the Indian Ocean, remaining there until 9 January 1874, during which time he met Lord Lindsay and David Gill who were preparing to observed the transit of Venus later that year, in order to obtain new data to measure the distance between the Earth and the Sun. During their brief encounter, Morris was able to build a relationship with Gill, such that he and Gill collaborated on the next mission to observe the transit eight years later, and subsequently in the survey of South Africa.

On returning to England in 1874, he entered the Staff College, graduating with honours at the beginning of 1876. In July 1877, he was appointed Assistant Instructor in Surveying at the Royal School of Military Engineering at Chatham, Kent, where he remained for five years. He was promoted to captain on 29 October 1879.

In 1882–83, he was in charge of the British expedition based in Brisbane, Queensland, Australia to study the Transit of Venus, under the overall command of David Gill. In Queensland, Morris was accompanied by Lieutenant Leonard Darwin (the son of Charles Darwin) and Cuthbert Peek (later 2nd Baronet) and Peek's assistant, Charles Grover. The party were based at Jimbour, 150 miles north-west of Brisbane, where they spent six weeks in November/December 1882. Despite observing a large number of double stars and clusters, the party failed in their mission to observe the actual transit of Venus on 7 December because of cloud cover.

On his return to London in 1883, Morris worked for two months on special duty under the Colonial Office, before being directed to lead a party to South Africa to carry out a geodetic survey (calculating the dimensions and shape of the Earth) of the Cape Colony and Natal, under the overall direction of David Gill, who was now H.M. Astronomer at the Royal Observatory at the Cape of Good Hope. Morris and his team of 15, including Lieut. Henry Laffan, the son of the late Sir Robert Laffan, arrived in Durban in June 1883, and commenced the survey by measuring a 3 km. baseline near the Umgeni River, between Pietermaritzburg and Greytown. By the end of 1883, the party had surveyed a chain of points between Newcastle and Kokstad, a distance of approximately 400 kilometres (250 mi).

Through 1884 and early 1885, the team continued their survey, connecting the chain to Pietermaritzburg and Durban, before the Natal government became concerned about the cost and slow progress of the survey. As a result Laffan and four NCOs were transferred to undertake a less costly and less accurate mapping survey, leaving Morris to continue the geodetic survey with a reduced party of assistants. By March 1886, Morris had extended his survey through the Transkei to King William's Town, where they linked up with the survey undertaken by Captain William Bailey in 1859.

During late 1886, the party was again reduced for financial reasons, leaving Morris with only five NCOs to continue the survey. By November 1887, the reduced party had managed to re-survey Bailey's chain as far as Port Elizabeth, and on to Caledon where in June 1890 they connected to the arc of the meridian surveyed by Sir Thomas Maclear in the 1840s. Morris continued the survey until field work was halted in September 1892, after which he returned to Cape Town, to write up his report, before returning to England in October 1893.

During his time in South Africa, Morris was promoted major on 31 December 1886 and to lieutenant colonel on 14 July 1893. On 3 June 1893, Morris was appointed Companion of the Order of St Michael and St George (CMG) "for services connected with the Geodetic Survey of the Colonies of the Cape of Good Hope and Natal".

In his 1896 report of the survey, David Gill included Morris's work, with this praise for Morris:

Colonel Morris' services have been such as very few men have the combined physique and capacity to render; these services have been given by him with unstinted disregard of his own comfort, and with a thoroughness and heartiness which only love of the work and a high sense of duty could inspire.

On his return to England, Morris was placed in command of the Training Battalion at Chatham, becoming assistant commander of the entire school from 1895 to July 1898. On 22 June 1897, Morris was in command of the battalion of Royal Engineers present at the procession to celebrate Queen Victoria's Diamond Jubilee for which he received the Queen Victoria Diamond Jubilee Medal. Morris was promoted to brevet colonel on 14 July 1897.

On 22 July 1898, Morris was appointed colonel on the staff of the Royal Engineers and returned to South Africa, acting as district inspector based at Cape Town during the Second Boer War. He was also Commanding Royal Engineer in the Cape Colony District. According to his obituary in The Times, Morris was frustrated during this period that "no use whatever was made of his unique knowledge of the topography of Cape Colony". Despite this, he was twice mentioned in dispatches for "special and meritorious service". During his time in Cape Town, Morris and his staff arranged for the construction of lines of blockhouses across the war zone. For his services in South Africa during the Boer war, Morris was appointed a Companion of the Order of the Bath (CB) from 29 November 1900.

After the war had ended in June 1902, Morris vacated the Cape Colony command and was placed on half-pay four months later. He again linked up with David Gill, when he was in November 1902 appointed Superintendent of the Ordnance Survey of Transvaal and Orange River Colony, with Gill acting as scientific adviser. Morris supervised the measurement of five baselines and eight geodetic chains, comprising 178 triangles. Morris retired from the army in February 1904, continuing in his post as a civilian. The fieldwork was completed in July 1906, following which Morris wrote up his reports before returning to England in early 1907. According to the Biographical Database of Southern African Science, Morris's "contribution to surveying in South Africa was extensive and of lasting value, and carried out with enthusiasm and devotion to duty".

After his death, one of Morris's assistants in South Africa, Victor Lowinger wrote:

Morris was devoted to his work and inspired all who worked under him with the values of thoroughness and accuracy. He chose his men carefully and trusted them to get on with the job, while at the same time he was always ready to resolve any difficulties that arose. He was of a very reserved nature and, though a little intolerant of human weaknesses, very just in his judgements—a man with whom one has been proud to have been associated in one of his great practical contributions to geodesy.

In the 1907 Birthday Honours, Morris was appointed Knight Commander of the Order of St Michael and St George (KCMG) "in recognition of services as Superintendent of the Trigonometrical Survey of the Transvaal and Orange River Colonies".

== Marriage and children ==
On 27 April 1871, Morris married Edith Sophia Tireman (1849–1917) at St Margaret's Church at Bowers Gifford in Essex, where the bride's father, the Revd. William Tireman was the parish priest. The wedding ceremony was conducted by The Right Reverend Thomas Claughton, Bishop of Rochester, a friend of the bride's father.

The couple had four children:

- Guy Brooke Morris (1874–1904)
- Winifred Morris (1875–1962)
- Lionel Tireman Morris (1876–1920)
- Hugh Cunningham Morris (1878–1972)

Winifred was first married to Colonel Alfred Digby Legard (1878–1939) and then to Lieut.-Colonel George Henry Addison (1876–1964), whose father, George William Addison had played football for the Royal Engineers in the 1872 and 1874 FA Cup Finals.

Following Edith's death on 7 January 1917, William Morris married Ethel Joan Warren (1866–1956), daughter of the late Mr. Robert Warren of Gosford Pines near Ottery St. Mary in Devon, at St. Gabriel's Church in Warwick Square, London on 4 July 1917.

== Retirement and death ==
On returning to the United Kingdom in 1907, Morris retired to Betws-y-Coed in North Wales, living firstly at "Fron Heulog" before settling at "Islwyn".

He died at "Islwyn" on 26 February 1935, aged 88, and was buried at St Michael's Church at Betws-y-Coed .

== Bibliography ==
- Barnes, Stuart, ed. (2009). Nationwide Football Annual 2009–2010. SportsBooks. ISBN 978-1-899807-81-9.
- Collett, Mike (2003). The Complete Record of the FA Cup. Sports Books. ISBN 1-899807-19-5.
- Gibbons, Philip (2001). Association Football in Victorian England – A History of the Game from 1863 to 1900. Upfront Publishing. ISBN 1-84426-035-6.
- Warsop, Keith (30 November 2004). The Early F.A. Cup Finals and the Southern Amateurs. Nottingham: SoccerData. ISBN 978-1899468782.
