= Segar Bastard =

English footballer (1854–1921)

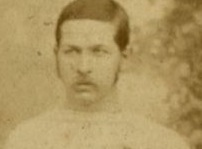

Personal information
- Full name: Segar Richard Bastard
- Date of birth: 25 January 1854
- Place of birth: Chigwell, Essex, England
- Date of death: 20 March 1921 (age 67)
- Place of death: Epsom, Surrey, England
- Positions: Outside right; forward

Senior career*
Years	Team	Apps	(Gls)
1873–1887	Upton Park		
- Trojans
- Leyton

International career
1880	England	1	(0)
- * Club domestic league appearances and goals

Segar Richard Bastard (25 January 1854 – 20 March 1921) was an English amateur association football player and referee born in Chigwell, Essex. He played football on an amateur basis for three clubs as well as playing for England once. He was also an international referee and was held in high regard throughout English football. Bastard also played county cricket for Essex County Cricket Club and Marylebone Cricket Club and was a solicitor by profession.

== Football ==
Bastard grew up in Bow, London, and played for Upton Park between 1873 and 1887. He also played for Trojans and Leyton. and occasionally played as a guest player for Corinthians. Like many of his contemporaries, Bastard was a player and a referee—unlike modern referees, who are neutral and have no playing connections. He refereed the 1878 FA Cup Final between Wanderers and Royal Engineers at The Oval. He also refereed England's first match against Wales at the same venue on 18 January 1879. In his role as a referee, Bastard was well-respected by the fans, players and his fellow referees. After refereeing the 1878 FA Cup final, he was referred to as a "knight of the whistle".

Bastard's debut as an international player came on 13 March 1880, when he played for England as an outside right against Scotland at The Oval, in which Scotland won the match 5–4. That match was his only international appearance for England. Between 1877 and 1883, Bastard was also a member of one of The Football Association's committees.

== Cricket ==
Bastard also played cricket for Essex County Cricket Club in 1881, 1882 and 1885, where he was listed on cricket scorecards as "S. R. Bastard". He made his debut for Essex against the Marylebone Cricket Club (MCC) at the Old County Ground, Brentwood, where he was out for a duck in his first batting innings and later scored the winning runs after coming in to bat at number three to be three not out after the MCC were forced to follow on. In his next match for Essex against Hertfordshire County Cricket Club at the Old County Ground in Brentwood, Bastard was again out for a duck in his first innings after being given out leg before wicket. Bastard's next match against Suffolk County Cricket Club was at Portman Road in Ipswich; he was again out for a duck in his first innings after being bowled out. This resulted in Bastard getting a king pair after he was caught out in his second innings.

After that, Bastard did not play for Essex for three years. He was recalled in 1885 to play against Northamptonshire County Cricket Club at Racecourse Ground Promenade in Northampton. Bastard was again out for a duck in his first innings but scored nine in his second innings. Bastard then became a member of the MCC. In 1886, he played his final cricket match for the MCC against his home county at the County Ground, Leyton. In his first innings, he was nine not out, and in his final innings, he was out for a duck.

== In popular culture ==
In English football culture it has been claimed that because of his name, Bastard was the inspiration behind the football chant, "Who's the bastard in the black?", which is sung to the tune of "Guide Me, O Thou Great Redeemer". The chant is usually aimed by English football fans towards football referees. It is unlikely, however, that Bastard was the inspiration for the chant; the colour of the clothing he wore while refereeing was not documented, and football chants did not include verbal aggression towards officials until the 1960s, long after Bastard had died.

== Personal life ==
Bastard was born in Chigwell to Richard Bastard and Josephine Green. His family were working class; his father was a hop merchant by trade. Bastard's family initially ran a merchants shop and drapers in Exeter called Wholesale Linen-Drapers and Hop-Merchants until 1870, when it was dissolved by mutual consent of the family members. A law firm named Segar Bastard & Company was created as a result of Bastard's family ceasing to run the drapers and merchants shop, and Bastard trained and later practised as a solicitor. One of his high-profile clients was Ashanti Goldfields Corporation. Bastard was also on the boards of a number of mining companies; he was listed as a director of Escurial Copper Mines Limited and Tarkwa Main Reef Limited, while also serving as the chairman of Black Eagle Gold Mining Company Limited and Wassan Extended Gold Mines Limited. In June 1884, Bastard married Gertrude Littlewood Garrett in West Ham; they had a daughter named Florence Garrett Bastard.

Bastard was noted for gambling; he was also a fan of horse racing and is one of the first football figures known to have owned a race horse. He died aged 67 in 1921 after a heart attack at Epsom railway station in Surrey. In his will, Bastard left £11,000 (approximately £465,600 in 2025) to his wife.
