= Muhammad Faiyaz Ali Khan =

Nawab Mumtaz-ud-Dowlah Sir Muhammad Faiyaz Ali Khan of Pahasu KCIE KCVO CSI CBE

Foreign Minister of Jaipur State
- In office 1900–1901
- Preceded by: NA
- Succeeded by: NA

Member of Legislative council of United Provinces
- In office 1898–1902

Personal details
- Born: 1851 Pahasu, Muttra District, North-Western Provinces, British India
- Died: 1922 (aged 70–71) Pahasu, United Provinces, British India

Nawab Sir Muhammad Faiyaz Ali Khan Bahadur KCIE KCVO CSI CBE (1851–1922) was a Nawab of Pahasu, a member of the Governor General's Council of the United Provinces of Agra and Oudh and Member of the Legislative council of the United Provinces.

== Early life ==
Faiyaz Ali Khan was born to Sir Muhammad Faiz Ali Khan in 1851 in a Muslim Rajput family belonging to Lalkhani branch.

He had two wives and had 3 children from his first wife and one child from 2nd wife Khan.

== Positions ==
- 1898-1902: Member of Legislative council of United Provinces
- 1898-1900: Member of Governors General's Legislative council

Khan was appointed Foreign Minister of Jaipur State Council in 1901 of Maharaja Sawai Madho Singh II (1880–1922).

In 1902, he was chosen to represent the United Provinces of Agra and Oudh at the coronation in London of King Edward VII and Queen Alexandra.

== Honours and decorations ==
- January 1903: Companion of the Order of the Star of India (CSI)
- June 1907: Knight Commander of the Order of the Indian Empire (KCIE)
- December 1911: Knight Commander of the Royal Victorian Order (KCVO)
- January 1919: Commander of the Order of the British Empire (CBE)

He was honoured with the titles of Khan Bahadur and Mumtaz-ud-Daula.

== Philanthropy ==
He was noted for his philanthropic works and had devoted a large estate for charitable purpose. He also founded an Anglo-vernacular school at Pahasu in 1899. He had donated large amount for public and charitable purposes.

He also build the Mumtaz hostel of Aligarh Muslim University. And it is named after his name only. He also served as President of Board of Trustees of Aligarh Muslim University.

== See also ==
- Pahasu
