= Pahasu =

Pahasu town
- city
- Nickname: Pahasu
- Location in Uttar Pradesh, India
- Coordinates: 28.18°N 78.05°E
- Country: India
- State: Uttar Pradesh
- District: Bulandshahr

Government
  - Type: Nagar panchayat
  - Chairperson: Tavir Ajmal
- Elevation: 187 m (614 ft)

Population (2011)
  - Total: 20,672

Languages
  - Official: Hindi, Urdu
- Time zone: UTC+5:30 (IST)
- PIN: 203396

Pahasu is a town and a nagar panchayat in Bulandshahr district in the Indian state of Uttar Pradesh.

== Geography ==
Pahasu is located at 28.18°N 78.05°E. It has an average elevation of 187 metres (613 feet).

== History ==
Pahasu was a jagir during British India owned by Nawabs belonging to Lalkhani Muslim"Pahasu" is a large Muslim feudals of Aligarh (UP)."Pahasu" in British India was represented by Old and young party in UP legislative council from years 1909 to 1919.

== Nawabs of Pahasu ==
- Mumtaz Ud Daula Nawab Sir Mohammed Faiz Ali Khan (1821–1894) of Pahasu
- Mumtaz Ud Daula Nawab Sir Mohammed Faiyaz Ali Khan (1851–1922)
- Mumtaz Ud Daula Nawab Mohammed Mukarram Ali Khan (1895–1969)

== Demographics ==
As of 2001 India census, Pahasu had a population of 17,116. Males constitute 53% of the population and females 47%. Pahasu has an average literacy rate of 48%, lower than the national average of 59.5%: male literacy is 57%, and female literacy is 38%. In Pahasu, 17% of the population is under 6 years of age
