= Robert Hedley =

English soldier and footballer

Lieut. Robert Shafto Hedley (17 January 1857 – 29 January 1884) was an English soldier and footballer. He was the captain of the Royal Engineers team that reached the final of the FA Cup in 1878, where they were defeated 3–1 by the Wanderers.

== Early life and education ==
Hedley was born in Taunton, Somerset and educated at Reading School. At Reading, he played for the school football XI from 1871 to 1873, including in a match against Reading F.C. in its inaugural season.

According to the 1871 census, he lived with his mother, Catherine, at Easby Hall, Easby, Richmond in Yorkshire.

On leaving school, he joined the Royal Military Academy, Woolwich. On 2 August 1876, he was appointed as lieutenant in the Royal Engineers.

== Football career ==
Hedley played football for the Royal Military Academy and for the Royal Engineers. A centre-forward, he was described as "a useful centre, combining considerable speed and weight with no small amount of energy", although early reports suggested that "he should study shooting at goal".

In 1878, his scoring ability helped the Royal Engineers to reach the final of the FA Cup with hat-tricks in the early rounds against the Pilgrims (won 6–0) and Druids (won 8–0). For the final, played at Kennington Oval on 23 March, Hedley was captain for the Engineers. Wanderers won the match 3–1 although early in the second half, with the score 2–1, Hedley had a "goal" disallowed due to an infringement of the offside rule.

His goal-scoring for the Engineers brought him to the attention of the England selectors who named him in the squad for the international against Scotland on 2 March 1878, but he was not available to play. He was called up again for the Scotland international the following March, but this match was postponed because of bad weather and he was again unavailable for the re-arranged match.

Hedley was a member of the Football Association committee in 1878–1879.

== Military career and death ==
Hedley was posted to Ceylon where he drowned at Trincomalee on 29 January 1884, two weeks after his 27th birthday. He was out boating and landed on a rock offshore. At some point, his boat came loose and drifted away; Hedley tried to swim back to the boat, but failed to reach it. Eventually, his body was discovered by a search party who had been sent out to look for him.
