= Charles Ashpitel Denton =

English footballer (1852–1932)

Charles Ashpitel Denton (24 October 1852 – 28 September 1932) was an English amateur footballer who twice won the FA Cup with Wanderers. In his professional life, he was a solicitor.

== Early life and education ==
Denton was born at St. Bartholomew's Vicarage in Moor Lane, Cripplegate in the City of London; his father was vicar of St. Bartholomew's Church. He was educated at Bradfield College between 1862 and 1872 before going up to Trinity College at the University of Oxford. He graduated in 1876 with a Bachelor of Arts degree.

== Football career ==
Denton was a member of the Bradfield College football XI from 1869 to 1872, being captain in his final year. He also played for Oxford University, Swifts and Wanderers and was later a member of the Casuals club.

He made his debut for the Wanderers on 13 January 1872 and then played the occasional match over the next few years. It was only in the 1876–77 season that he began to play regularly, helping the Wanderers reach the Cup Final against Oxford University. The Wanderers were victorious by a 2–1 margin after extra time.

In 1877–78, Denton was virtually ever-present making 14 appearances, scoring eight goals as Wanderers again reached the FA Cup Final, this time against the Royal Engineers. The 1878 FA Cup Final was their fifth appearance in the seven years since the tournament was inaugurated. With Denton making "some fine runs" on the left wing, the Wanderers were again victorious, thus taking the trophy for the fifth and final time.

Denton was described in the 1878 Football Annual as "a fast wing player [who] did good service for the Wanderers in some of the cup ties; not a good shot at goal". He was one of the few players to appear regularly for the Wanderers after 1878 as the club gradually declined. By the time that he played his last match in February 1880, Denton had made 41 appearances with 12 goals.

== Professional career ==
Denton qualified as a solicitor in 1880 and later became assistant secretary of the Union Bank of London. In 1891, he was appointed secretary of the London Assurance Corporation based at the Royal Exchange. He retired in 1921.

Denton was also a keen cricketer and played for Bradfield College from 1870 to 1872 and was a member of the M.C.C.

Denton died on 28 September 1932, aged 79, at the Grand Hotel, Folkestone. At the time of his death he was resident at Grosvenor Place, Westminster.

== Honours ==
Wanderers

- FA Cup: 1877, 1878
