= Trojans F.C. (1869) =

Trojans
- Full name: Trojans F.C.
- Nickname(s): the Leytonites
- Founded: 1869
- Dissolved: 1877?
- Ground: West Ham Park
- Secretary: W. F. Fearn, Joseph Warry, W. Ringrose
Home colours

Trojans was an English association club based in Leyton.

== History ==
The club gave its foundation date as 1869 although its first recorded match was a 1–0 defeat away to Leyton in January 1871. The club's members also played cricket over the summer, in which its XI proved more adept than at football.

The club had strong connections with the legal profession, first captain/secretary Fearn and Segar Bastard both being solicitors, Fearn giving the club's correspondence address as the legal department at Bishopsgate railway station.

The club entered the FA Cup on two occasions, never playing a match. In the first round in 1873–74, the club was drawn to play at Farningham, who scratched; in the second round (the last 14), the club drew the Cup holders, and Trojans decided they "were not bold enough to face the redoubtable Wanderers". In 1876–77 the club was drawn to play at Sheffield and again scratched.

The final recorded match for the club was on 24 February 1877, a 1–1 home draw against Hawks. For the 1877–78 season, some of the Trojans players joined other clubs based at West Ham Park, including Dreadnought F.C., Spartan Rovers, and Grasshoppers, and the Trojans club seems to have disbanded.

== Colours ==
The club's colours were described black and white stripes, which probably refers to the design being hoops, other than in 1875, when they were referred to as blue and white stripes.

== Ground ==
Its original ground was five minutes' walk from Leyton station, but in 1874 the club moved to West Ham Park.

== Notable players ==
- Segar Bastard, who played for the club from 1871 to 1873.
