= John Wylie (footballer, born 1854) =

English footballer

Personal information
- Full name: John George Wylie
- Date of birth: 5 October 1854
- Place of birth: Shrewsbury, England
- Date of death: 30 July 1924 (aged 69)
- Place of death: Wandsworth, England
- Position: Forward

Senior career*
Years	Team	Apps	(Gls)
- Shropshire Wanderers
- Sheffield
1875–1879	Wanderers		

International career
1878	England	1	(1)
- * Club domestic league appearances and goals

John George Wylie (5 October 1854 – 30 July 1924) was an English amateur footballer who played as a forward. He won the FA Cup with Wanderers in 1878 and played once for England in 1878. He also took part as an athlete, winning the Pentathlon at the National Olympian Games in 1879.

== Career ==
Wylie was born in Shrewsbury and was educated at Shrewsbury School between 1869 and 1872. After leaving school he moved to Sheffield where he trained as a solicitor. He qualified in 1878 after which he joined a practice in London. In 1881, he was living in Putney. He died, aged 69, in Wandsworth, London.

== Football career ==
His early football was played with Shropshire Wanderers, before moving to Sheffield where he earned representative honours for the city of Sheffield. In the 1874 match against London, he was "borrowed" by the opposition who had insufficient players available. In March 1874, he was selected for the England match against Scotland, but had to withdraw at a late stage, and was replaced by John Hawley Edwards who thus made his solitary England international appearance.

He then joined Wanderers making his first appearance for them in January 1875. He only made a significant contribution to the Wanderers in 1877-78, when he made eleven appearances, scoring nine goals, six of which came in FA Cup matches. Wanderers thus reached their third consecutive cup final, when on 23 March 1878 at the Kennington Oval, they defeated the Royal Engineers 3–1.

Three weeks before the Cup Final, Wylie (together with fellow Wanderers forwards Henry Wace and Hubert Heron) was again selected for the annual international fixture against Scotland. The game did not end happily for England as the Scots ran out 7–2 victors, although Wylie did score one of England's late consolation goals.

Simultaneous to playing with Wanderers, Wylie and two brothers were founder players in 1876 of Southill Park, which he left in 1877. With them he notably scored 6 goals against Mosquitoes in January 1877 and 7 against St Mary's College of Peckham the following month.

Wylie remained with the Wanderers until 1879, making his final appearance on 28 November. He was described by C. W. Alcock in the 1879 Football Annual as "a good centre, with pace and strength (who) should play for his side more".

== Honours ==
Wanderers

- FA Cup winner: 1878

== International goals ==
Scores and results list England's goal tally first.

#	Date	Venue	Opponent	Score	Result	Competition
1	2 March 1878	Hampden Park, Glasgow	Scotland	1–6	2–7	Friendly

== Athletic achievement ==
As a member of the Shropshire Wanderers, Wylie took part in the National Olympian Games held at Shrewsbury in 1879, when he won a cup presented for the Pentathlon event by King George I of Greece. He also came joint winner in high jump, won a heat in the quarter-mile handicap, and third in heat of 100 yards flat race, 120 yards hurdles and pole leaping.
