= Old Harrovians F.C. =

English football club, based in London

Old Harrovians
- Full name: Old Harrovian Association Football Club
- Nickname: the Blues
- Founded: 1876; 150 years ago
- Ground: Harrow School Sports Centre
- League: Arthurian League Division One
Home colours

The Old Harrovian Association Football Club, more informally known as the Old Harrovians, is a football club from London, England, for former pupils of Harrow School.

== History ==
Although occasional games had been played by sides made up exclusively of former pupils of the school, the first such recorded match taking place in 1859, the origins of the club came from the Harrow Chequers, a club formed for current and former pupils. In 1876, a new club developed solely for former pupils, making its first appearance in October 1876 against Harrow School itself. The first lineup for the Old Harrovians was: R. de C. Welch (captain), and E.E. Bowen, backs; M.P. Betts and F.D. Simpson, upper side, F.B. Howell and G. Macan, lower side, C. Colbeck, C.C. Bowley, H.F. Blaine, G. Lane, A.A. Hadow, and H. Carlisle)

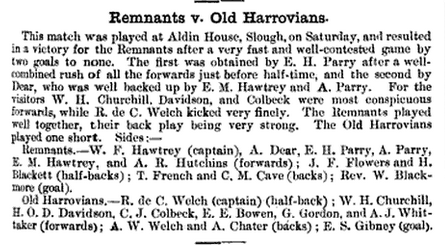
Report of October 1878 match.

Under its new guise, the team played in the FA Cup competitions regularly in the late 1870s and 1880s. Though they lost 2–1 to the Royal Engineers in the first round of the 1876–77 FA Cup, the 1877–78 FA Cup saw the team's greatest success. They defeated 105th Regiment 2–0 in the first round, and then beat 1st Surrey Rifles in the second. Following a 2–2 draw against Cambridge University in the third round, the first replay also ended 2–2, before a second replay saw Old Harrovians win 2–0 to advance to the fourth round. Of the three-match battle with Cambridge, The Athletic World commented that Cambridge "was only beaten by the 'Ex-Harrow Boys' after two drawn games, Harrow playing men who would have otherwise have played in the opposing team."

In the fourth round, they defeated Upton Park 3–1, putting them into the semi-finals and needing only to beat the Royal Engineers to face the Wanderers (who had a bye) in the final. However, they lost 2–1 in the semi-finals on 16 March 1878; the Harrovians took the lead, but, just before half-time, captain R. de C. Welch suffered an eye injury, which required him to go in goal for the remainder of the match, "weakening his side considerably"; the Sappers duly scored twice in the second half to go through. There were obviously no hard feelings between the sides, as the Sappers nominated the Old Harrovian half-back Beaumont Jarrett as its umpire for the final.

The following season saw another cup run as the team beat Southill Park 8–0 in the first round and Panthers 3–0 in the second, before losing 2–0 to Nottingham Forest in their third match.

From then onwards, the club's fortunes diminished; in the 1879–80 FA Cup they lost 2–1 to Finchley in the first round. In 1880–81, they drew with Maidenhead United in the first round, and then lost in a replay. In the 1881–82 FA Cup, they beat Olympic, a textile factory works' side, 4–2 in the first round, before a 7–1 defeat to Swifts in the second.

The club did not appear in FA Cup again until 1885–86, first talking a walkover over St James, beating Old Foresters 2–1, but were then disqualified in their third round match against Swifts - the Harrovian secretary, thinking a deep frost would make the match unplayable, did not choose an XI, but the frost melted on the morning of the match, not allowing him notice to summon a team. In the 1886–87 FA Cup, Old Westminsters defeated Old Harrovians 4–0 in the first round. In the 1887–88 FA Cup, the Old Harrovians defeated Hendon 4–2 in the first round but lost to the Old Brightonians in the second, a match which would be their last appearance in the proper rounds of the FA Cup.

In the 1888–89 season, due to the large increase in entrants, the FA Cup started to incorporate qualifying rounds. That season, the Old Harrovians defeated Rochester 4–2 in the first qualifying round, but lost 1–0 to Crusaders of Brentwood in the next match. The following season, the club lost their first qualifying match 4–2 to Norwich Thorpe, a result which was repeated in 1890–91 when they were defeated by Gravesend. The last recorded entry for the club was in 1892–93, losing to Old Wykehamists F.C. in the preliminary round.

Harrow School abolished "soccer" in 1927, which meant that the Old Harrovians disbanded in 1931, with no new players coming through. The school relaxed its stance 30 years later and the club was re-established in 1963. It is a member of the Arthurian League, which the club has won on three occasions, and it has won the Arthur Dunn Cup once.

== Colours ==
The club colours are dark blue and white, taken from the old Chequers colours, but more recently as solid dark blue shirts and shorts.

== Ground ==
The club plays on the school's playing fields.

== Honours ==
- FA Cup
  - Best performance: semi-final, 1877–78
- Arthurian League
  - Winner: 1977–78, 2003–04, 2009–10
- Arthur Dunn Cup
  - Winner: 2006–07

== See also ==
- Official site
