= 1st Surrey Rifles F.C. =

Former association football club in England

1st Surrey Rifles
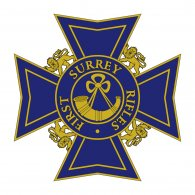
- 1st Surrey Rifles regimental badge, as sometimes found on the club's shirts
- Full name: First Surrey Rifles Football Club
- Nicknames: the Rifles, the Riflemen
- Founded: 1869
- Dissolved: 1887
- Ground: Flodden Road, Camberwell
1870–75 colours	1875–76, 1884–87 colours

1st Surrey Rifles F.C. was an amateur football club from Camberwell, open to members of the corps, who featured in the early years of the FA Cup from 1872 to 1878 and from 1885 to 1887.

== History ==
The club claimed a foundation date of 1869, and was open to all members of the corps, unlike the officer-only Royal Engineers. Its first reported match played against external opposition was a 1–0 victory against the Lausanne club at the latter's Rosemary Branch ground in 1871. At least five of the Lausanne players (Davenport, Foster, Dümmler, Dearle, and F. Maynard) were also members of the regiment, and from 1872 played for the Riflemen as the Lausanne association side disbanded.

The club's first Cup tie, in 1872–73, resulted in a 2–0 win over Upton Park, in poor weather, the second goal coming near the close of play. It lost 3–0 in the second round away at Maidenhead, all three goals coming in the second half; it was the Rifles' first-ever defeat.

The club did not win again in the competition until 1877–78, with a home win over Forest School. The only goal came after "Allport, calling on his men for a sort of infantry charge, went bodily through the ranks of his enemies, and Kirkpatrick, taking advantage of an opportunity that presented itself, made a splendid long kick, and although Littlewood tried hard to turn aside the ball with his hand, it bounded off and went under the tape." R. L. Allport, the club captain, had started the game in goal, but soon swapped out.

The club's second-round defeat to the Old Harrovians was its last in the competition for seven years, as the club went into abeyance; both Allport and John Maynard played in the club's first and last matches in the Cup. It was revived in 1884, and entered the national competition again in 1885–86. The 12–0 home defeat in the first round to Clapham Rovers (eight coming before half-time), and the 9–0 defeat in the first round the following year at home to Upton Park, demonstrated that the game had passed the club by; to add insult to injury, one of the Upton Park goals was scored by goalkeeper Evans, who had swapped with forward Inglis after the latter was injured. Although the club remained a member of the Football Association until 1887, it never played competitively again.

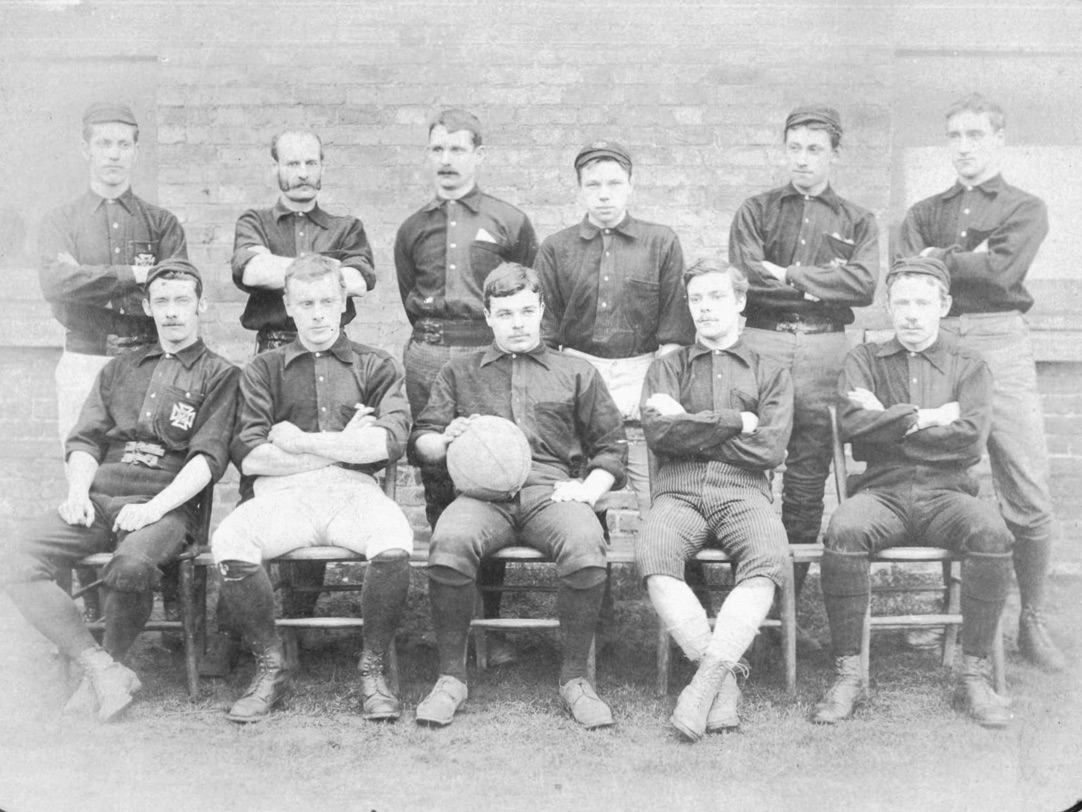
First Surrey Rifles football club, 1885–86

== Colours ==
The club's colours, according to the Charles Alcock annuals, were as follows:

- 1870–75: scarlet cap, blue jersey (with a gold bugle specified from 1872)
- 1875–76: red and black
- 1876–78: red and black cap, white shirt, white knickers, red and black stockings
- 1884–87: red and black

== Ground ==
The club originally played home games at its barracks in Brunswick Road, Camberwell. By 1877, the club was playing at Flodden Road.

== Notable players ==
- W. J. (John) Maynard, who played in the first-ever official football international and earned two caps while with the Riflemen.
