= Horace Barnet =

English soldier and footballer

Personal information
- Full name: Horace Hutton Barnet
- Date of birth: 6 March 1856
- Place of birth: Kensington, Middlesex, England
- Date of death: 29 March 1941 (aged 85)
- Place of death: Kensington, London, England
- Position: Forward

Senior career*
| Years | Team | Apps | (Gls) |
- Royal Engineers
- Corinthian

International career
| 1882 | England | 1 | (0) |
- * Club domestic league appearances and goals

Colonel Horace Hutton Barnet (6 March 1856 – 29 March 1941) was an English soldier and footballer.

== Early and personal life ==
Barnet was born on 6 March 1856 in Kensington, which was then in Middlesex. He had two younger siblings, and their father worked as an East Indian merchant. He attended Rugby College. He was married by 1891, to an Indian woman, but was widowed by 1911.

== Military career ==
He served in the military with the Royal Engineers, rising to the rank of Colonel before retiring in the 1900s. Barnet was recalled by the military during World War I.

== Football career ==
Barnet played club football for Royal Engineers and Corinthian, and was an FA Cup runner-up in 1877–78.

He earned one cap for England, against Ireland on 18 February 1882.

== Later life and death ==
He died on 29 March 1941 in Kensington, London at the age of 85.
