= Arthur Cursham =

English footballer and cricketer

Personal information
- Full name: Arthur William Cursham
- Born: 14 March 1853; Wilford, Nottingham, England
- Died: 24 December 1884 (aged 31); Florida, USA
- Batting: Right-handed
- Bowling: Right-arm slow

Domestic team information
- Years: Team
- 1876–1878: Nottinghamshire
- 1879–1880: Derbyshire
- FC debut: 28 August 1876 Notts v Yorkshire
- Last FC: 26 August 1880 Derbyshire v Kent

Career statistics
Competition	First-class
Matches	21
Runs scored	314
Batting average	8.97
100s/50s	0/1
Top score	67
Balls bowled	104
Wickets	1
Bowling average	49.00
5 wickets in innings	0
10 wickets in match	0
Best bowling	1/39
Catches/stumpings	10/–
- Source: CricketArchive, 10 August 2010

Arthur William Cursham (14 March 1853 – 24 December 1884) was an English cricketer and footballer. He played football for England and for Notts County between 1876 and 1883. He played cricket for Nottinghamshire from 1876 to 1879 and for Derbyshire from 1879 to 1880.

== Early life ==
Cursham was born in Wilford, Nottingham the son of William Cursham, solicitor and, at one time, mine owner. He attended Oakham School and became a mine manager.

== Football career ==
He played football for Notts County, between 1876 and 1883 and made his England footballing debut in March 1876 in a 3–0 home defeat at the hands of Scotland. A photograph of this team is believed to be the first ever photograph of an English team. However Cursham does not appear in the picture – it is believed he was behind the camera. He made six international footballing appearances in total, four coming against Scotland and two against Wales.

== Cricket career ==
Cursham made his County Cricket debut during the 1876 season, playing his first game for Nottinghamshire in a low-scoring victory against Yorkshire. He, along with the rest of the Nottinghamshire team, failed to impress in a match in which only one player would reach double figures in each of the first three innings, himself scoring just three runs from the middle order. Cursham, a right-handed batsman and a round-arm bowler, appeared extensively for Nottinghamshire during the 1877 and 1878 seasons, scoring a maiden career half-century against Middlesex in 1877.

Cursham moved to play briefly for Derbyshire during the 1879 season. He played regularly in the Derbyshire lower order, scoring a duck in his debut innings, though failing to break into the side as a bowler. He played for Derbyshire again in the 1880 season, retiring from the game at the age of 27.

Three years after the end of his cricketing career, Cursham played two further games for the England national football team, a victory against Wales in which he scored his second and final international goal, and a defeat against Scotland.

Cursham emigrated to the United States at the end of his footballing career, just a year after his final international footballing appearance. He died in Florida at just 31 years of age from yellow fever.

His brother Henry was also an England international footballer.
