= Pilgrims F.C. =

Pilgrims
- Full name: Pilgrims Football Club
- Founded: 1871
- Dissolved: 1887
- Ground: Hackney Downs/Tottenham/Walthamstow
1871–79 colours	1879–87 colours

Pilgrims F.C. was an English association football club based in the north of London.

== History ==
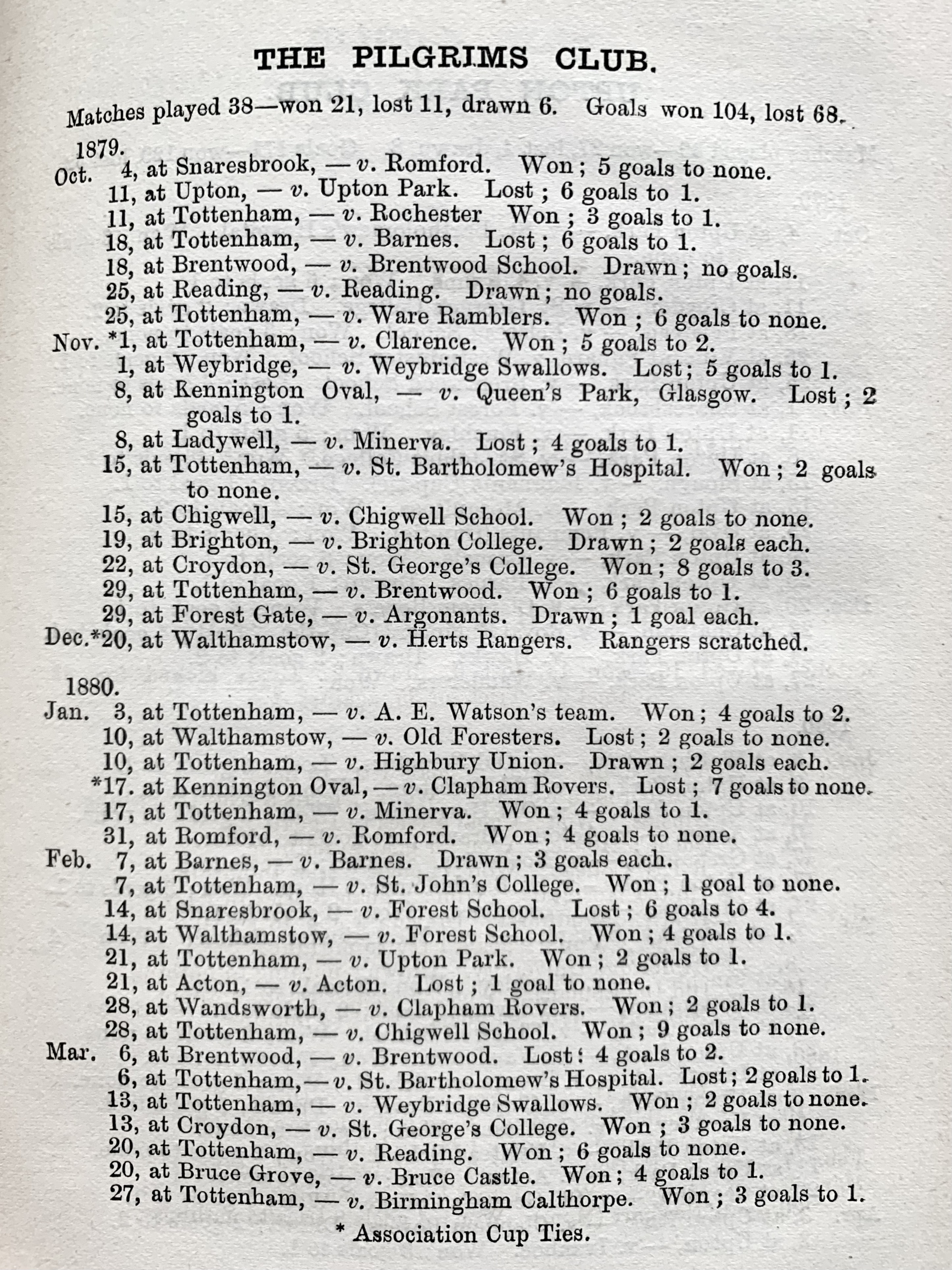
Results for the 1879–80 season, published in the 1880 Football Annual

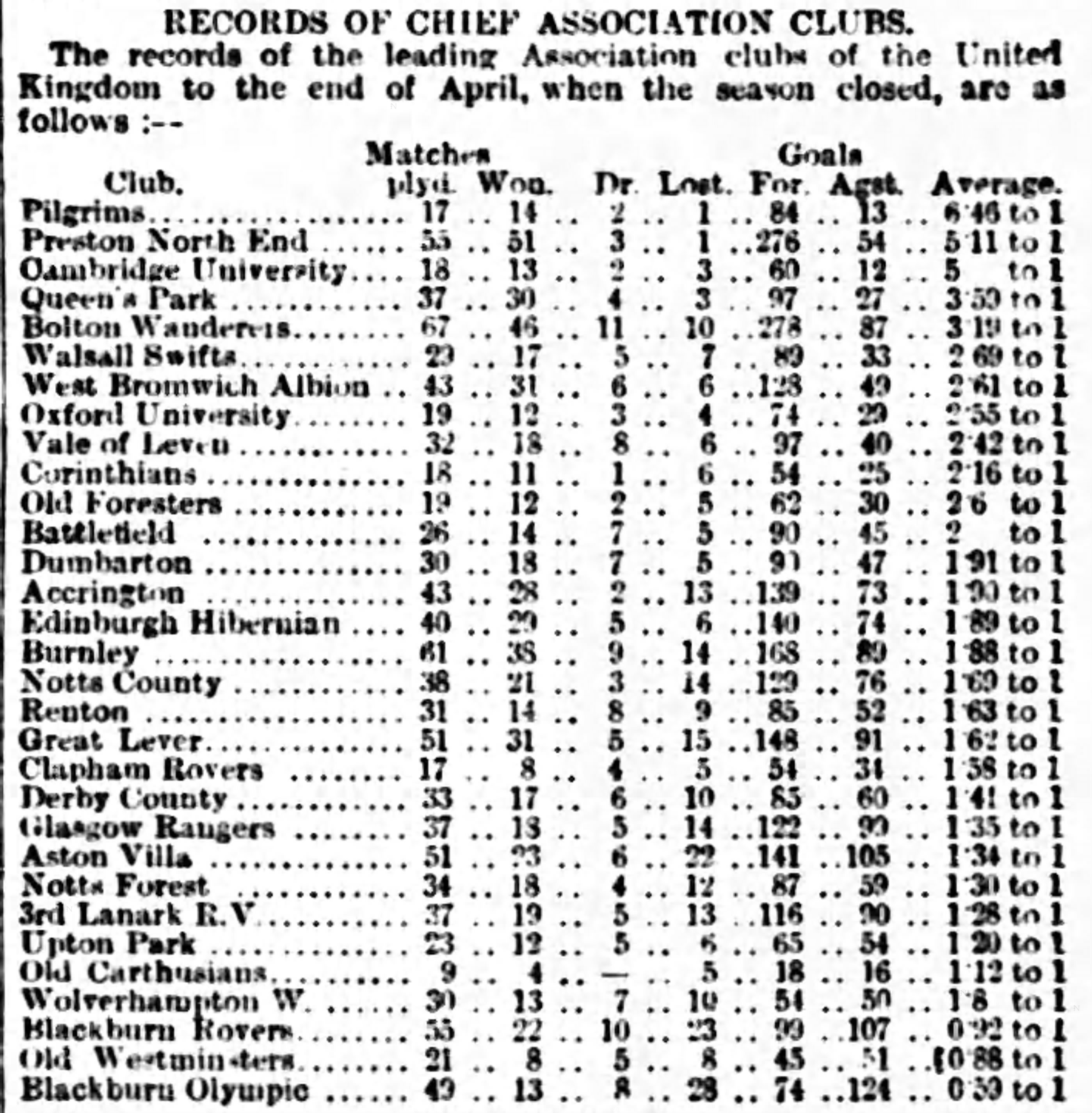
An early form table, showing the leading clubs ranked by goal average, Newcastle Daily Chronicle, 13 May 1886

The club was founded in 1871 under the name Clapton Pilgrims, changing its name to Pilgrims in 1873. The club restricted playing membership to 60 players.

The club's first known match was a 0–0 draw with Leyton on Hackney Downs. The club is known to have played five matches in its first season (against Forest F.C., Trojans, the return against Leyton, and Herts Rangers), and every one ended in a draw. After the Forest match, the Pilgrims raised the issue of clubs borrowing players from other clubs, as Pilgrims restricted its choices solely to its members.

In 1874, Pilgrims player John van Sommer was chosen as a reserve for England for the international match against Scotland. On 7 November 1874 van Sommer played in goal for the London select team in the match against the Sheffield Football Association. It was van Sommer's final match as soon after he caught rheumatic fever and died on 19 November 1874. The Sportsman's obituary stated that "the writer saw him at Sheffield displaying on behalf of London certainly the best goal‐keeping that has ever been witnessed at the Association game. Indeed, his skill on that occasion led those present to predict for him a place in the International match of the year."

The club entered the FA Cup every year from 1873–74 to 1884–85, its best outing being reaching the third round (last ten) in 1876–77, and the same stage - this time with 15 clubs still in the competition - in 1879–80. In both years, it met the eventual winners in the third round. In 1876–77 the club was drawn away to eventual winners the Wanderers, and lost 3–0, but keeping a clean sheet for 70 minutes; the Wanderers struggled so much against the "pluck" of the Pilgrims that Alfred Kinnaird had to swap out of goal to add some vigour to the attack, with his cross creating the first goal. The second occasion was far less auspicious, Clapham Rovers beating the "overmatched" Pilgrims 7–0 at the Kennington Oval.

In the 1880s the club also started to enter the London Senior Cup, reaching the semi-final in 1885–86. Again the club was unlucky to be drawn against eventual winners, this time Ashburnham Rovers, who won 3–1, the tie being held at the Kennington Oval. Its season overall however was highly successful, with 14 wins in 17 matches and a goal average of nearly 6.5 ranking the club as the strongest in southern England.

The club seems to have stopped playing regular matches after the 1886–87 season. The club's final secretary, John Henderson, undertook refereeing and umpiring activities as a member of the Pilgrims club in 1886–87, but for 1887–88 was described as being from "Morpeth Harriers, formerly Pilgrims". The last recorded fixture for the club was a win over the Forest School in December 1887.

== Records ==
- Best FA Cup performance: 3rd Round – 1876–77 and 1879–80

== Colours ==
The club's original colours were black and white “in broad bars”, black skullcap with white tassel, white knickerbockers, and black stockings. It dropped the cap in 1878 and in 1879 changed the shirts to black and white halves.

== Grounds ==
The club originally played at Hackney Downs, and used the Shakespeare inn on Downs Park Road for changing. In 1876, the club moved to Lordship Lane, Tottenham, and in 1880 the club moved to Walthamstow, a 5 minute walk from St. James Street railway station.

== Ramblers F.C. ==
In 1874, a separate club, Ramblers F.C., was set up, often using Pilgrims players, and the two clubs were described as "sister clubs". The two clubs were drawn against each other in the FA Cup twice (Pilgrims winning on both occasions) and Ramblers' players often played for both sides in the same season.

== Notable players ==
- Clopton Lloyd-Jones
- Harry Swepstone
- Andrew Watson
