= Highbury Union F.C. =

Highbury Union
- Full name: Highbury Union Football Club
- Nickname: Union
- Founded: 1873
- Dissolved: 1885
- Ground: Christ Church Field (original)
- Secretary: Henry Scruton
Home colours

Highbury Union F.C., more usually simply known as Union, was an English association football club from Islington.

== History ==
The club was founded on 14 July 1873 as a club playing both rugby football and association codes. The club continued playing both codes until at least 1877, but by 1881 was solely an association club.

Although claiming a foundation date of 1873, the club's first external association rules match seems to have taken place in October 1875, against Hornsey Rovers. The club competed in the FA Cup in 1876–77, losing 5–0 at Rochester, and scratched its entry in 1877 when drawn to face the Royal Engineers. The club also took part in 1881–82 and 1882–83, but lost in the first round both times; the first time 1–0 to Hotspur after having a goal disallowed for offside, the second time 4–1 at the powerful Swifts side, the Union's goal being a consolation near the end from Poulton.

By this time, the club was homeless, and in 1883 was reported as defunct, with its players (including captain Frank Webster) joining Romford instead. The Union name was resurrected for the 1884–85 London Senior Cup, and in the second round, the club was drawn to visit the Old Foresters. Union apparently had won at the Foresters' Snaresbrook home, but a replay was ordered at Romford after a protest about one of the Union goals. The replay was vitriolic, as the referee was "Pa" Jackson, who had made some adverse comments about the Union side. Rather than standing down as referee, he insisted on taking charge, and, after a series of controversial decisions led to the visitors winning 3–2, the home crowd mobbed Jackson, but the London Association backed their referee following a protest, and banned Union from hosting any further competitions that season.

== Colours ==
The club's colours were originally dark blue jerseys with a red Maltese cross on a white ground, red cap, and blue stockings. In 1877, these changed to chocolate and light blue, with white knickers and brown socks. In 1882 the club changed again to scarlet and black.

== Ground ==
The club's first ground was Christ Church Field, near Highbury Station, and the club used the Alwyn Castle as a changing room. By 1877 it was playing out of Victoria Park, using the Cassland Hotel for facilities. However by 1881 the club was without a ground, and was forced solely to play away matches.
