= History of Manchester United F.C. (1878–1945) =

History of an English football club

Manchester United Football Club was formed in 1878 as Newton Heath LYR Football Club by the Carriage and Wagon department of the Lancashire and Yorkshire Railway depot at Newton Heath. The team initially played games against other departments and rail companies at their home ground at North Road, but by 1888 the club had become a founding member of The Combination, a regional football league. However, following the league's dissolution before the end of its first season, Newton Heath joined the newly formed Football Alliance, which ran for three seasons before being merged with The Football League. This resulted in the club starting the 1892–93 season in the First Division, by which time it had become independent of the rail company, dropped the "LYR" from its name and moved to a new ground at Bank Street. After just two seasons, the club was relegated to the Second Division.

In January 1902, with debts of £2,670 – equivalent to £280,000 in 2025 – the club was served with a winding-up order. Captain Harry Stafford found four local businessmen – including John Henry Davies, who became club president – each willing to invest £500 in return for a direct interest in running the club. As a mark of this fresh start, on 24 April 1902, the club's name was changed to "Manchester United". Under Ernest Mangnall, who became club secretary in 1903, the team finished as Second Division runners-up in 1906 and secured promotion to the First Division, which it won in 1908 – the club's first league title. The following season began with victory in the first ever Charity Shield and ended with the club's first FA Cup trophy. Manchester United moved to a new stadium at Old Trafford in 1910, and won the First Division for the second time in 1911, but at the end of the following season, secretary Mangnall left to join Manchester City.

In 1922, three years after the resumption of football following the First World War, the club was relegated to the Second Division, where it remained until regaining promotion in 1925. Relegated again in 1931, Manchester United became a yo-yo club, achieving its all-time lowest position of 20th place in the Second Division in 1934. Following the death of John Henry Davies in October 1927, the club's finances deteriorated to the extent that Manchester United would likely have gone bankrupt had it not been for an investment of £2,000 in December 1931 by James W. Gibson, who assumed control of the club. In the 1938–39 season – the last year of football before the Second World War – the club finished 14th in the First Division. During the war, the club participated in the Wartime League and the Football League War Cup, but in 1941, Old Trafford was damaged by German bombs and would not be fully repaired until 1949.

== Early years: 1878–87 ==
In 1878 the Lancashire and Yorkshire Railway Company granted permission for the employees of its Carriage and Wagon department to start a football team, which was subsequently named Newton Heath LYR, with Frederick Attock appointed as this new club's president. LYR stood for "Lancashire & Yorkshire Railway" and was used to distinguish the team from their colleagues from the Motive Power Division, who were known as Newton Heath Loco. The team was funded by the railway company, who paid the lease on its first home ground, a field close to the railway yard on North Road. It is said that the players were "tough, diligent men who formed a powerful side"; they initially played games against other teams of railway workers, very few of which were recorded. During the 1882–83 season, the team played a total of 26 recorded friendly matches, and the following season competed in the Lancashire Cup but lost 7–2 in the first round to the reserve team of Blackburn Olympic. In 1884, Newton Heath LYR applied for the Manchester and District Challenge Cup and reached the final, which they lost 3–0 to Hurst at Whalley Range. The team never failed to score at least three goals in each of the rounds leading up to the final, including in a first round match against Eccles that had to be replayed after the Eccles management protested about Newton Heath's third goal.

Newton Heath reached the final of the Manchester and District Challenge Cup a further five times, winning all but one. Meanwhile, in 1886, the club began to expand by signing players of national reputation such as Jack Powell, who became club captain, Jack and Roger Doughty, and Tom Burke. In 1886–87 the club entered the FA Cup for the first time and were drawn away to Fleetwood Rangers in the first round; they managed to earn a 2–2 but when club captain Jack Powell refused to play a period of extra time, Fleetwood were awarded the tie. A subsequent unsuccessful protest to the Football Association led to Newton Heath LYR entering a self-imposed exile from the FA Cup, which lasted until 1889.

== League football: 1888–99 ==
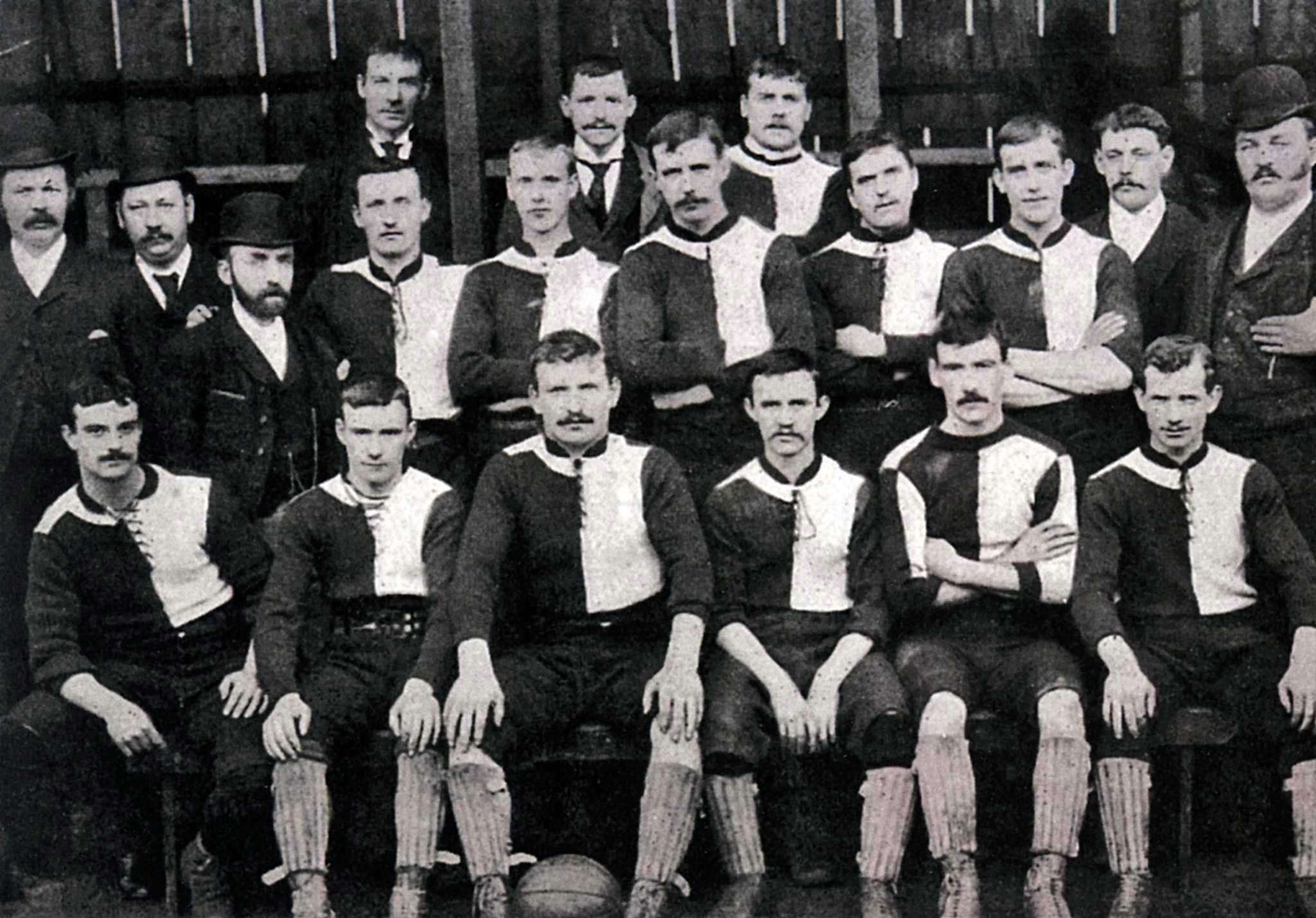
The 1892–93 Newton Heath team

In 1888, having been spurned by the newly formed the Football League, Newton Heath entered their first ever league competition, becoming founder members of The Combination. In April 1889, The Combination hit financial difficulties and was wound up before the season could be completed.

In 1890, after an unsuccessful application (they received only one vote) to join the Football League, Newton Heath and 11 other clubs not in the League formed an organisation known as the Football Alliance, in which they finished eighth in the first season. After three further applications, the club joined the Football League when it merged with the Football Alliance in 1892 and Newton Heath was elected to the First Division. In their final season in the Football Alliance, the club finished second to Nottingham Forest, who joined them in the First Division. By this time, the club had severed its formal ties with the railway company and had dropped the "LYR" from their name, although most players were still employees of the railway company. The club had also become a limited company, raising £2,000 of share capital (at £1 each) via an application form which was returned to club secretary A.H.Albut, the club's first full-time official, who also assumed managerial duties.

In their first season in the Football League, Newton Heath finished in last place and retained their First Division status by virtue of a win against Second Division champions Small Heath in a test match. In 1893, the team moved to a new ground in Bank Street, Clayton, next to a chemical plant. It was said that when Newton Heath were losing, the plant would belch out acrid fumes in a bid to affect the visiting team. The 1893–94 campaign, however, was no better, and they once again were in the play-offs against Second Division champions Liverpool. This time, Newton Heath were defeated 2–0 and were relegated to the Second Division.

On 9 March 1895, the manager of visiting Walsall Town Swifts registered an official complaint against the state of the pitch; "drab expanses of wet sand, tufted sparsely with grass". The game went ahead and Newton Heath beat Walsall Town 14–0, the largest unofficial margin of victory in the club's history, but the result was declared null and void. In 1897, the club made the play-offs but failed to make back into the First Division.

== Financial problems: 1900–02 ==
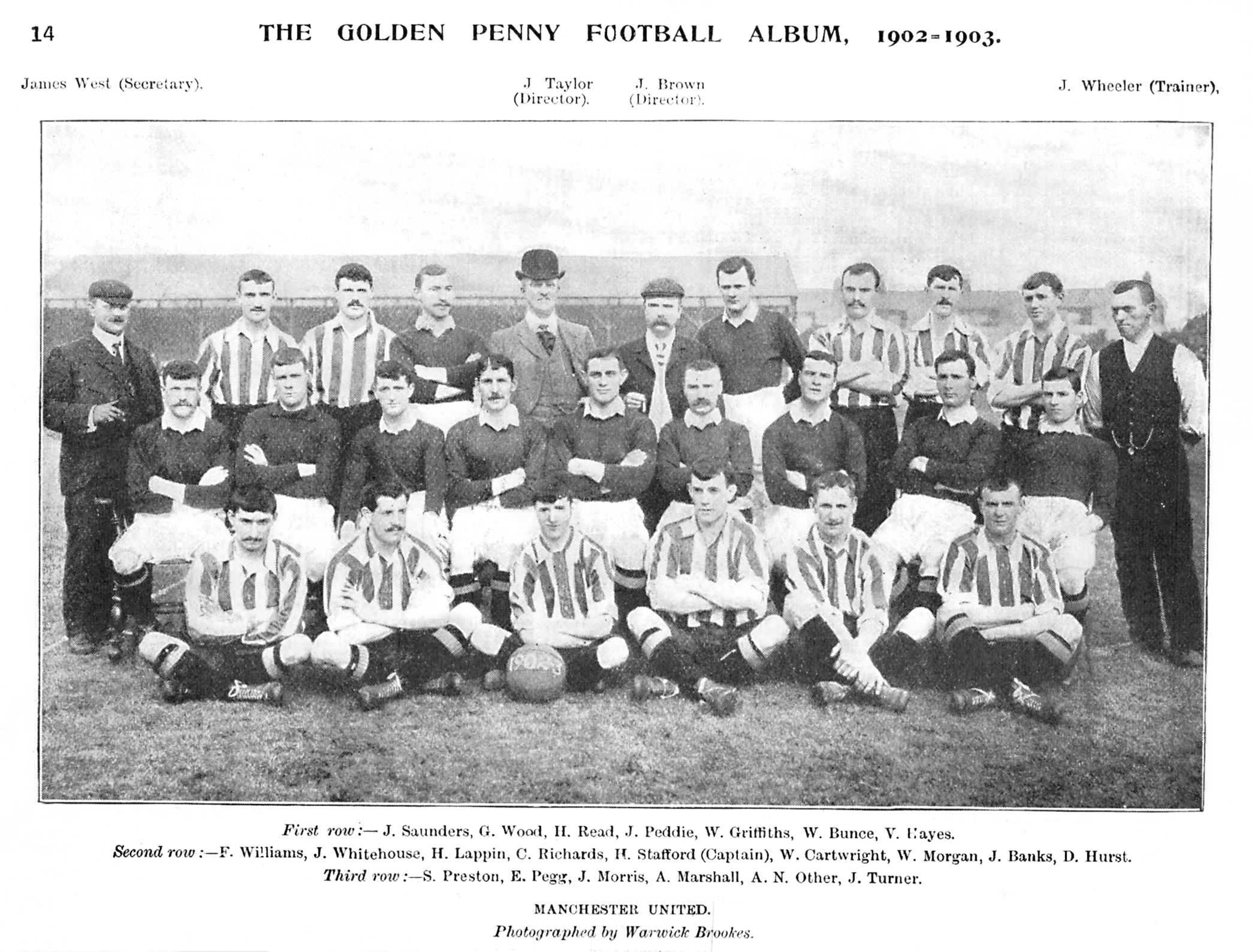
The 1902–03 Manchester United team, whose players pose wearing both home and alternate jerseys

They managed only 10th place in the 1901 season, losing more games than they won and with ticket sales flagging and debts mounting, the club decided to hold a four-day bazaar to raise money at St James Hall, Manchester. According to legend, one of the attractions was club captain Harry Stafford's St. Bernard dog, Major, who escaped with a collection tin on one of the nights after the bazaar had closed. Major then found his way to local brewer John Henry Davies, whose daughter became so smitten with it that he enquired about the origin of the tin, and in doing so saved the club.

On 9 January 1902, Club President William Healey applied to the court for a winding-up order against the club, claiming he was owed £242 17s. 10d.

On Monday, 13 January 1902, the Manchester Guardian reported:

Attention was directed to the Second League by the unusual experience of Newton Heath. The club is financially in a bad way. A winding up order to meet a debt of £242 precipitated matters last week and no arrangements could be made for playing the game fixed for Saturday. One hears that a new club will be formed out of the ashes of the old one, but this has not been decided definitely.

Newton Heath were revived in time to play their next fixture on Saturday 18 January 1902.

It was the escape and recapturing of the dog which led to the meeting between team captain Harry Stafford and Davies, heading a group of three other investors. Together, they came up with £2,000 to save the club.

John Henry Davies became the club president, and on 24 April 1902, given that the team was no longer based in Newton Heath, the new owners renamed the club Manchester United Football Club, after considering the alternative names "Manchester Celtic" and "Manchester Central". The former was considered because a significant number of the individuals who established Newton Heath were Irish immigrants who had relocated to Manchester to obtain employment in the railway industry. They also changed the team's colours to red and white.

Having been saved from liquidation by four wealthy businessmen, the club played its first season as Manchester United in 1902–03. The badly needed injection of cash, plus some new players, gave the flagging side the boost it needed. They won 15 league games, notched up 38 points, and finished fifth.

== Change of fortune: 1903–18 ==
After a bad start to the season, the club took another important step in 1903 in hiring their first real team manager, Ernest Mangnall, a charismatic publicist who knew how to work the media. Under his leadership, the team finished third in the Second Division. The following season, Manchester United set a record when they went 18 games undefeated after losing to Bolton 2–0 in September 1904 up until they lost to Lincoln City 3–0 in February 1905. During the season they finished 3rd with 53 points. Off the field the club suffered a financial setback when they were banned from selling alcohol inside the ground, although under the ownership of Davies they at least had solid financial backing.

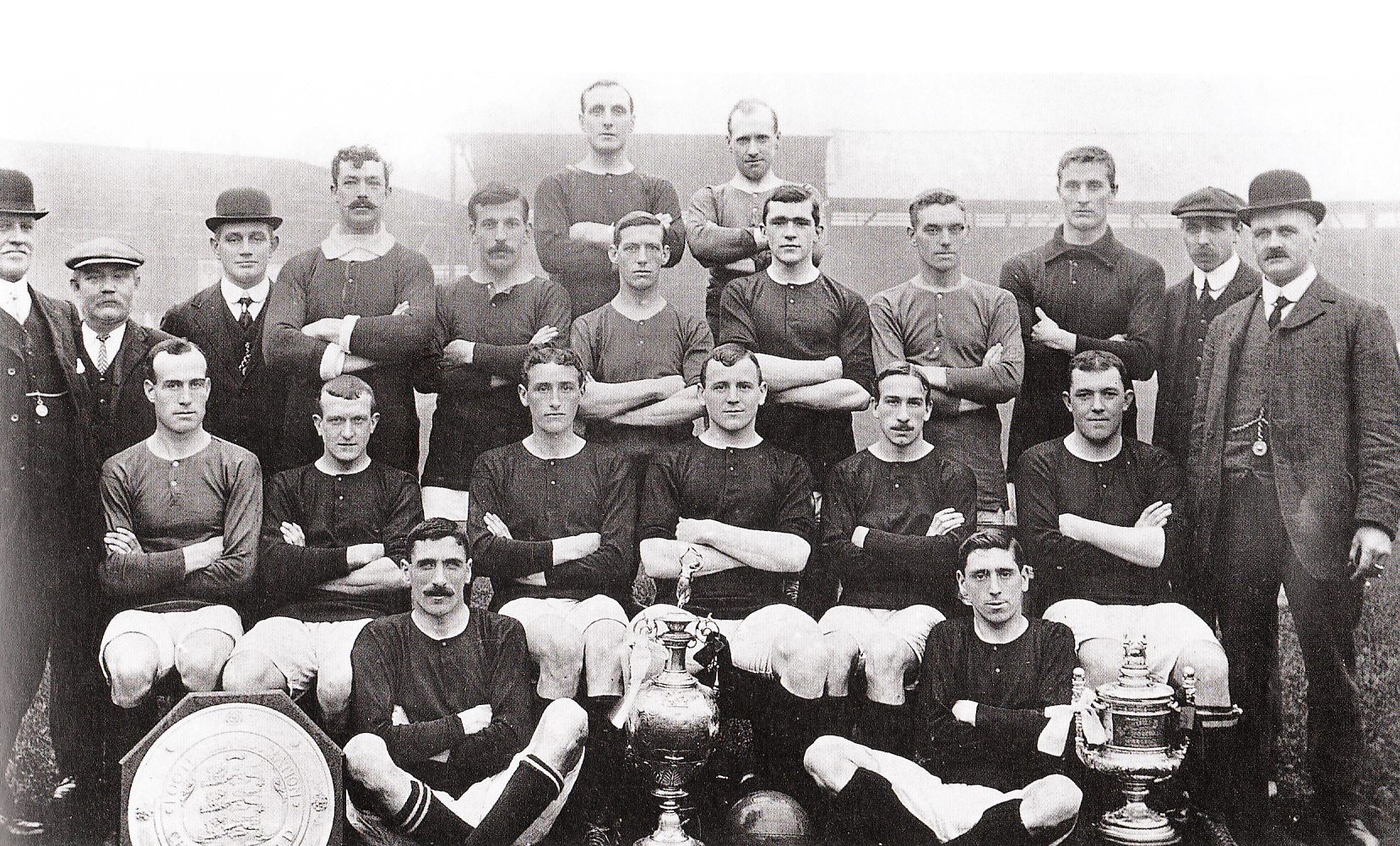
The Manchester United FC team of 1908–09 posing with their trophies won that season: FA Charity Shield, the Football League (First Division) and the FA Cup

Mangnall created United's first successful side with a series of signings, eventually winning promotion in 1906. They finished second overall and reached the quarter-finals of the FA Cup, beating holders Aston Villa (one of the most successful English teams of that era) 5–1 in the fifth round. Among these signings was Billy Meredith, a legendary winger who is regarded by many as the greatest player of that era.

Ernest Mangnall managed to sign star defender Herbert Burgess, Alec "Sandy" Turnbull, and Jimmy Bannister after a scandal hit Manchester City and forced them to sell off most of their team. It paid off, and Manchester United won their first League Championship in 1908. They even attempted to sign Australian rugby footballer, Dally Messenger, a man recognised by some to be the top footballer of any code in his day. The next year, FA Cup success would follow as they beat Bristol City in the final 1–0. Sandy Turnbull scored the only goal and Billy Meredith was named man of the match.

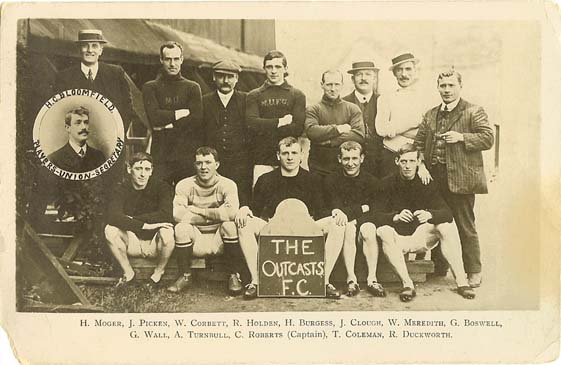
The "Outcasts F.C." at the start of the 1909–10 season

In 1908, John Henry Davies once again gave financial aid by lending £60,000, a huge sum at the time, to finalise the team's move to a new stadium at Old Trafford. They played their first game there on 19 February 1910 as Liverpool spoiled the celebrations with a 4–3 win in a close game. United finished that season fifth in the league.

Ernest Mangnall's leadership brought United to their first successful era. They would be the first winners of the Charity Shield in 1908, and the League again in 1911 pipping Aston Villa on a tense last day of the season. The historic Charity Shield victory in 1911 would be the end of this era and Mangnall would leave the next year for Manchester City.

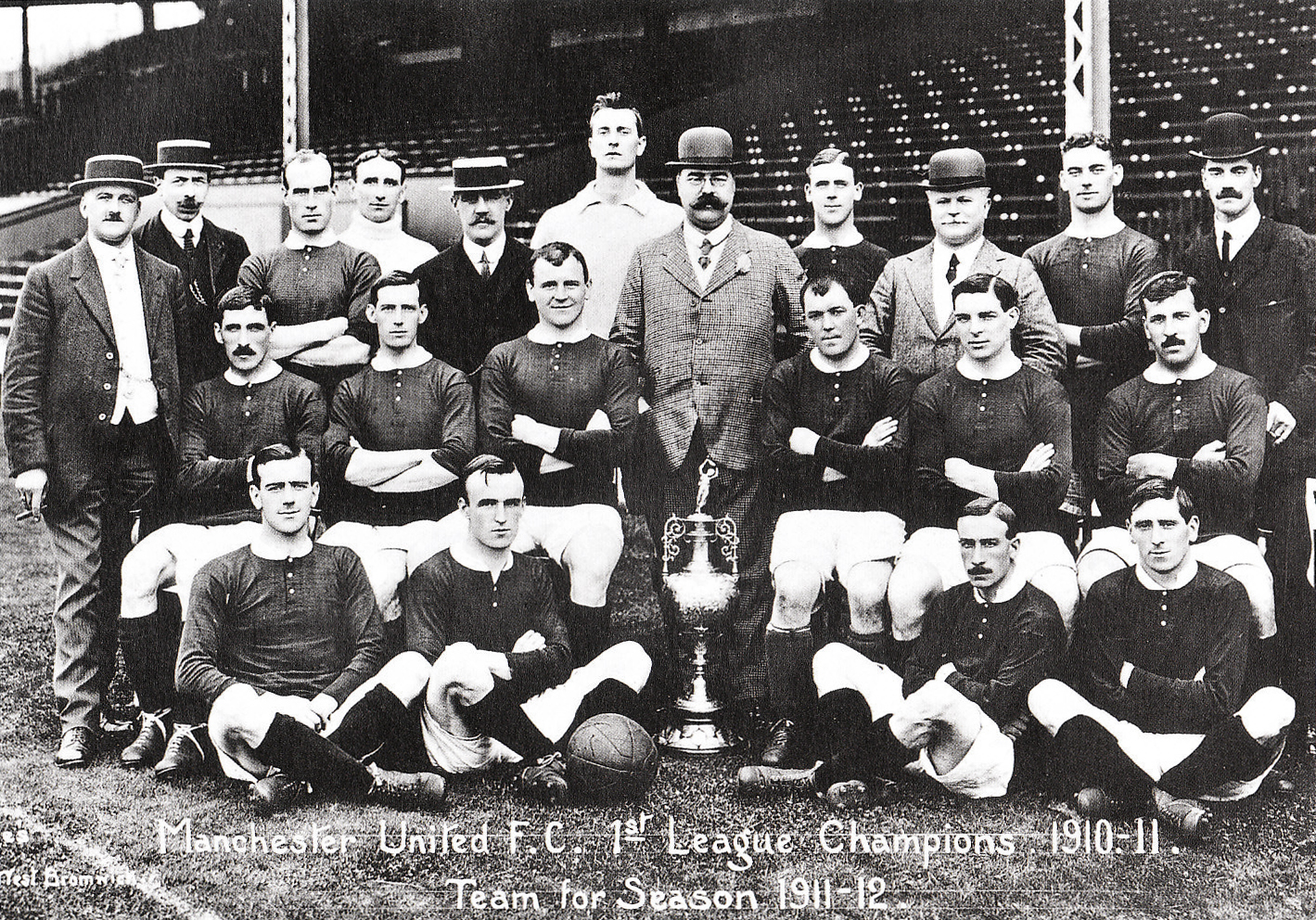
The 1911–12 Manchester United team posing with the Cup won the previous season

Manchester United players, in particular, Charlie Roberts and Billy Meredith, were instrumental in forming the Association of Football Players' and Trainers' Union (the AFPTU) (which the press called the Players' Union) in December 1907, the second attempt to unionize players. The Players Union is today the Professional Footballers' Association. When the Football Association threatened members of the Union with suspension before the start of the 1909–10 season, Manchester United players refused to relinquish their Union membership, and referred to themselves as "The Outcasts". A compromise was reached between the Football Association and the Union before the start of that season which allowed players to be Union members.

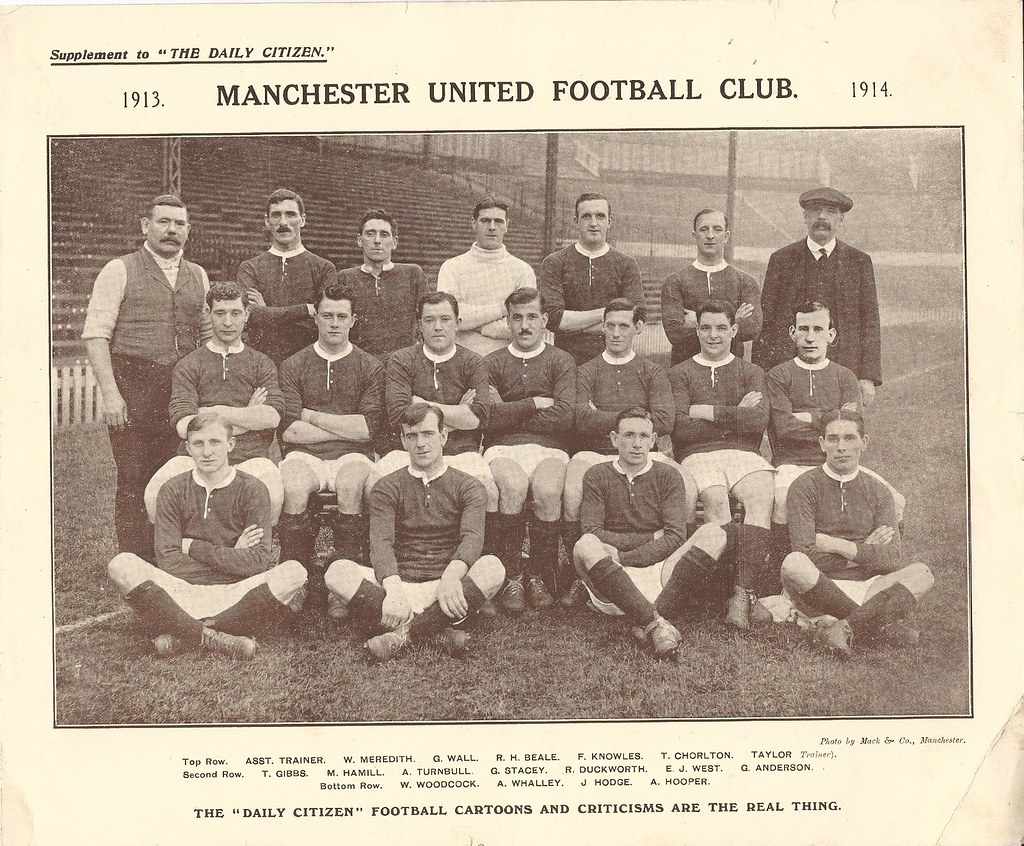
The Manchester United team at the start of the 1913–14 season – the 'Welsh Wizard', Billy Meredith, is on the left at the back.

Without Mangnall, the club stumbled to 13th place in 1912. Attendances slumped to 15,000 and the squad started to age under the leadership of J.J. Bentley. They narrowly escaped relegation in 1914–15 by one point; three of United's players were later found to have conspired with Liverpool players in fixing a United win in the match between the sides, in the 1915 British football betting scandal. The United players were found guilty of match fixing and banned for life.

The Football League was suspended at the outbreak of the First World War, during which Sandy Turnbull was killed in France. On 28 December 1914, Jack Robson was appointed as the club's first official manager; previously, the club secretary had been responsible for the majority of matters relating to the playing of the game. Mangnall's position as secretary was first filled by T.J. Wallworth, then by Bentley, under whom Robson worked. No football was played during the war, which meant that the club was not generating any revenue, but the club had to continue to pay for the running of Old Trafford, and as such the financial situation worsened. Bentley died in September 1918, two months before the end of the war and a year before the resumption of league football.

== Inter-war years: 1919–38 ==
At the end of the 1921–22 season, Manchester United were relegated to the Second Division, having won only eight games. United finally returned to the top flight under John Chapman in 1925, finishing second to Leicester City. In October 1927, John Henry Davies, who had saved the club from extinction and brought them to Old Trafford, died and was replaced by G.H. Lawton as club president. On 7 October 1926, the Football Association announced that Chapman had been suspended from "taking part in football or football management" during the 1926–27 season "For improper conduct in his position as Secretary-Manager of the Manchester United Football Club" and was replaced for the rest of the season by experienced player Lal Hilditch.

A new manager, Herbert Bamlett was installed, but the club never finished higher than 12th in 1929 and finally finishing bottom of the First Division in 1931 after starting the season losing twelve times in a row. The finances were once again in a mess, and the much criticised Herbert Bamlett resigned. Secretary Walter Crickmer was given control of the team for the next season, and was aided by chief scout Louis Rocca, largely because the club couldn't afford a new manager. The players had gone to collect their wages just before Christmas and were told there was no money available. Another financial bailout was needed. They managed to finish mid table in the Second Division in 1931–32, despite losing 7–0 at Wolverhampton Wanderers on Boxing Day 1931, but with the club's finances precarious it seemed possible that the club could go out of business.

A new investor, James W. Gibson, arrived in December 1931. He was approached by a Manchester sportswriter, Stacey Lintott. He met with the board and offered to help on condition that he became chairman and could choose his directors. They had little choice but to agree, and Gibson invested £30,000 into the club. A new manager was found, Scott Duncan, one of the new breed of managers who were retired players, now common, but an innovation in those days.

In 1934, United reached their lowest ever league position. On the final day of the season they were placed second-last in the table with their final match away against Millwall, who were one point ahead. With destiny in their own hands, they beat Millwall 2–0 and stayed in the Second Division by one point, sending their South London hosts down.

The next season saw an improvement with the side winning ten out of eleven games during October and November 1934. It seemed things were back on track and the fans started to flock back to Old Trafford as United finished fifth, just falling short of promotion. After five years in the Second Division, they finished champions in 1936 after being unbeaten in the last 19 games of the season and were promoted back to the First Division. The title was won with a 3–2 victory at Bury, where over 31,000 fans invaded the pitch to celebrate a return to the big time.

Their joy was short-lived, however, as they were relegated back to the Second Division the next season. Scott Duncan resigned, and Crickmer resumed the manager's chair. Although now £70,000 in debt, United picked themselves up and finished runners-up in 1938, returning to the First Division, with future stars such as Johnny Carey, Jack Rowley and Stan Pearson. They would stay there for 36 years; after finishing 14th the next season, World War II broke out.

== World War II: 1939–45 ==
Upon the outbreak of the Second World War in September 1939, association football was effectively frozen, and Old Trafford was requisitioned by the military to be used as a depot. Football continued to be played at the stadium, but a German bombing raid on Trafford Park on 22 December 1940 damaged the stadium to the extent that a Christmas Day fixture against Stockport County had to be switched to Stockport's ground. Football resumed at Old Trafford on 8 March 1941, but another German raid three days later destroyed much of the stadium, notably the main stand (now the South Stand), forcing the club's operations to move to Cornbrook Cold Storage, owned by United chairman James W. Gibson. After pressure from Gibson, the War Damage Commission granted Manchester United £4,800 to remove the debris and £17,478 to rebuild the stands, although rebuilding work did not resume until after the war ended in 1945. During the reconstruction of the stadium, Manchester United played their "home" games at Maine Road, the home of Manchester City, at a cost of £5,000 a year plus a percentage of the gate receipts.

== See also ==
- History of Manchester United F.C. (1945–1969)
- History of Manchester United F.C. (1969–1986)
- History of Manchester United F.C. (1986–2013)
