= 1886–87 Newton Heath LYR F.C. season =

English football club season

Newton Heath LYR F.C.
1886–87 season
- President: Frederick Attock
- Stadium: North Road Ground
- FA Cup: First Round
- Manchester Cup: Runners-up
Home colours

The 1886–87 season was the first season in which Newton Heath LYR F.C. – now known as Manchester United F.C. – took part in a major football competition. The club had previously entered the Lancashire Cup and the Manchester and District Challenge Cup, but this season was the first in which they competed in the FA Cup. However, their cup run was short-lived as they drew with Fleetwood Rangers in the first round, but were disqualified when they refused to play extra time.

The club also entered the Manchester and District Challenge Cup for the third season in a row, but lost 2–1 to West Manchester in the final, after having beaten Hooley Hill, Gorton Association and Gorton Villa 7–0, 11–1 and 8–0 respectively in the early rounds and Ten Acres 1–0 in the semi-final.

== FA Cup ==
The 1886–87 FA Cup was Newton Heath's first foray into a major competitive football tournament. They were drawn away to Fleetwood Rangers in the first round, and played out a close encounter that finished in a 2–2 draw; both of the Heathens' goals were scored by Jack Doughty. The referee had turned up to the match expecting to play a period of extra time if the match had finished in a draw, but Newton Heath's captain, Jack Powell, refused. Fleetwood complained about the incident to the FA, who then awarded Rangers the tie. Newton Heath then went into a self-imposed exile from the FA Cup, not entering again until 1889.

Date	Round	Opponents	H / A	Result F–A	Scorers	Attendance
30 October 1886	Round 1	Fleetwood Rangers	A	2–2	J. Doughty (2)	2,000

== Manchester and District Challenge Cup ==
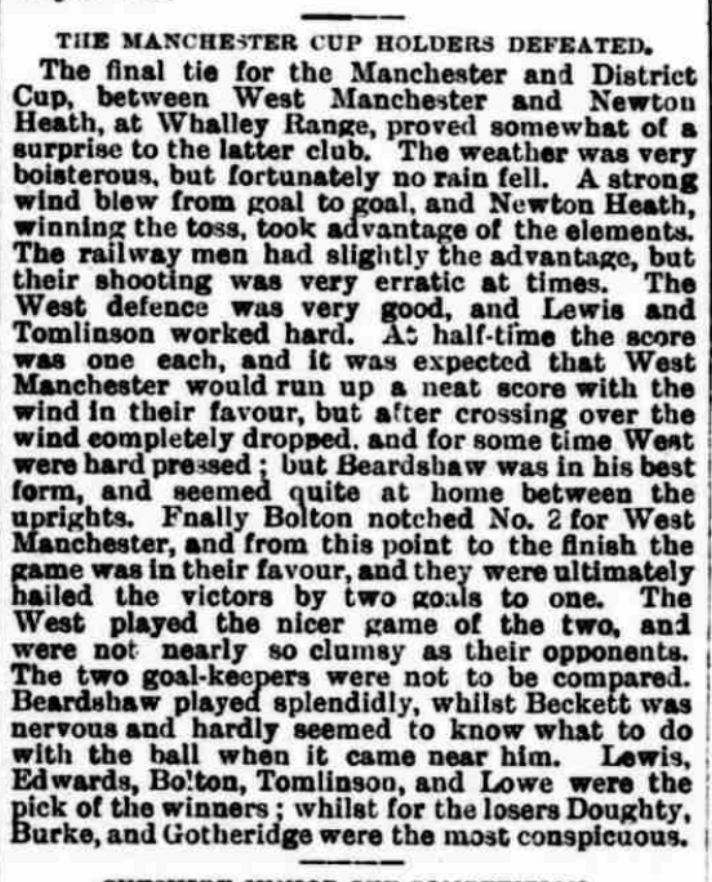
Report on the 1887 Manchester Senior Cup Final, Athletic News

The Heathens' third consecutive entry into the Manchester and District Challenge Cup also saw them reach the final for a third time in a row. The opening three rounds saw Newton Heath sweep aside all challengers, beating Hooley Hill 7–0 in the first round – two goals coming from James Gotheridge – followed by an 11–1 win and an 8–0 win over Gorton Association and Gorton Villa respectively.

The semi-final was the first time the club played away from home in the competition, and also put them up against Ten Acres in a sterner test than in the previous rounds. The Heathens eventually scraped through with a 1–0 win, the winner scored by Roger Doughty. As in the seasons before, the final was played at Whalley Range in central Manchester. However, a second title in three years was not to be for Newton Heath, as they capitulated by a score of two goals to one against the unfancied West Manchester.

Date	Round	Opponents	H / A	Result F–A	Scorers	Attendance
12 February 1887	Round 1	Hooley Hill	H	7–0	E. Davies, Whatmough, Burke, Gotheridge (2), Unknown (2)	
19 February 1887	Round 2	Gorton Association	H	11–1	E. Davies (2), Whatmough, Burke, Wright, J. Davies (2), Gotheridge, J. Doughty, Bates, Own goal	
19 March 1887	Round 3	Gorton Villa	H	8–0	J. Doughty (3), Wright, Bates, Gotheridge, H. Davies	6,000
2 April 1887	Semi-final	Ten Acres	Hurst	1–0	R. Doughty	7,000
23 April 1887	Final	West Manchester	Whalley Range	1–2	Gotheridge	4,000
