= 1887–88 Newton Heath LYR F.C. season =

English football club season

Newton Heath LYR F.C.
1887–88 season
- President: Frederick Attock
- Stadium: North Road Ground
- Manchester Cup: Winners
Home colours

The 1887–88 season was Newton Heath LYR's final season before entering into league football. They only entered one competitive cup competition during the season, the Manchester and District Challenge Cup. They won the tournament, beating Denton 7–1 in the final at Whalley Range. This is the first season in which the club are recorded as wearing red and white.

== Manchester and District Challenge Cup ==
Newton Heath LYR entered the Manchester and District Challenge Cup for the fourth time in 1887–88. Having reached the final in each of their three previous entries, they made it a fourth consecutive final appearance this season. They started their campaign in the Second Round away to Hooley Hill in March 1888, beating them 7–0. The semi-final against Hurst was played on neutral ground in Denton. It was a tougher match than the previous round, as proven by the 2–0 scoreline, with the Doughty brothers, Jack and Roger, getting a goal apiece.

As with the previous three seasons, the final was played at Whalley Range in south Manchester. Newton Heath's opponents in the final were Denton, who proved to be no contest, as Newton Heath won the match 7–1 to make it two Manchester Cup titles in four years. Both Doughtys scored in the final, as they both had done in the two previous rounds, with Jack getting a hat-trick and Roger a brace. The other two goals were scored by Joe Davies and Tom Burke.

Date	Round	Opponents	H / A	Result F–A	Scorers	Attendance
17 March 1888	Round 2	Hooley Hill	A	7–0	Burke, J. Doughty, R. Doughty (2), 3 unknown	
14 April 1888	Semi-final	Hurst	Denton	2–0	R. Doughty, J. Doughty	3,000
23 April 1888	Final	Denton	Whalley Range	7–1	J. Davies, Burke, J. Doughty (3), R. Doughty (2)	8,000
