= 1888–89 Newton Heath LYR F.C. season =

English football club season

Newton Heath LYR F.C.
1888–89 season
- President: Frederick Attock
- Stadium: North Road Ground
- The Combination: 1st
- Manchester Cup: Winners
- Top goalscorer: League: Jack Doughty (6); Roger Doughty (6); All: Jack Doughty (12)
- Highest home attendance: 4,000 vs Bootle (26 January 1889)
- Lowest home attendance: 2,000 vs Ardwick (16 March 1889)
Home colours

The 1888–89 season was Newton Heath's first season of league football, having become a founder member of the Combination in the summer of 1888. The Combination was created as an alternative to the Football League, but its first season was never completed and the league folded in April 1889. This was unfortunate for Newton Heath, as they were considered to have the best record in the league at the time.

As well as taking part in league football for the first time, the Heathens also made their traditional entry to the Manchester and District Challenge Cup. They had reached the final in each of their four previous entries, and the 1888–89 season was to be no different. Newton Heath took on Hooley Hill in the final at Whalley Range, beating them 7–0 to win the competition for the third time.

== The Combination ==
Date	Opponents	H / A	Result F–A	Scorers	Attendance
22 September 1888	Darwen	H	4–3	J. Doughty (2), R. Doughty, Gale	3,000
13 October 1888	Derby Midland	A	1–1	Walton	1,800
20 October 1888	Leek	H	4–1	R. Doughty (2), Gotheridge (2)	3,000
3 November 1888	Leek	A	5–0	J. Doughty (3), R. Doughty, Tait	
10 November 1888	Burslem Port Vale	A	1–1	J. Davies	
24 November 1888	Halliwell	H	2–0	R. Doughty, Tait	3,000
1 December 1888	Bootle	A	1–0	Powell	
5 January 1889	Darwen	A	0–3		
19 January 1889	Burslem Port Vale	H	3–0	G. Owen, Gale, Burke	3,000
26 January 1889	Bootle	H	4–0	R. Doughty, J. Doughty, J. Davies, Tait	4,000
2 March 1889	Derby Midland	H	2–0	Tait, Gotheridge	
30 March 1889	South Shore	H	0–1		3,000

Pos	Team	Pld	W	D	L	GF	GA	GAv	Pts
1	Newton Heath LYR	12	8	2	2	27	13	2.077	18

== Manchester and District Challenge Cup ==
Date	Round	Opponents	H / A	Result F–A	Scorers	Attendance
15 December 1888	Round 1	West Manchester	A	2–1	J. Doughty, R. Doughty	5,000
16 March 1889	Round 2	Ardwick	H	4–1	Owen, J. Doughty, Gotheridge (2)	2,000
6 April 1889	Semi-final	Manchester Welsh	Hullard Hall	2–1	Owen, J. Doughty	1,500
27 April 1889	Final	Hooley Hill	Whalley Range	7–0	Gale (2), J. Doughty (3), R. Doughty, Gotheridge	4,000

== Lancashire Junior Cup ==
Date	Round	Opponents	H / A	Result F–A	Scorers	Attendance
13 October 1888	Round 1	Denton		Bye		
3 November 1888	Round 2	Bury	A	0–4		
