= 1884–85 Newton Heath LYR F.C. season =

English football club season

Newton Heath LYR F.C.
1884–85 season
- President: Frederick Attock
- Stadium: North Road Ground
- Lancashire Cup: Second Round
- Manchester Cup: Runners-up
Home colours

The 1884–85 season was Newton Heath LYR's second season of competitive football. Having entered the Lancashire Cup for the first time the previous year, they reached the Second Round this time around. However, it was to be the last time that the club entered a senior team in the competition until 1889.

The Heathens also entered a team in the Manchester and District Challenge Cup for the first time in 1885, and found much more success than in the Lancashire Cup; they reached the final at the first attempt, where they lost 3–0 to Hurst. Apart from the final, the team scored three goals or more in every round of the competition.

== Lancashire Cup ==
The Heathens' first entry into the Lancashire Cup had seen them drawn against Blackburn Olympic, who beat them comfortably despite playing their reserve team. The 1884–85 tournament paired Newton Heath with Haydock Temperance, to be played at North Road. The match was won 4–0 and set up a clash with Baxenden the following month. However, Baxenden proved to be tougher opposition than Haydock and beat the Heathens 4–1.

Date	Round	Opponents	H / A	Result F–A	Scorers	Attendance
20 September 1884	Round 1	Haydock Temperance	H	4–0	Unknown	
25 October 1884	Round 2	Baxenden	A	1–4	Unknown	

== Manchester and District Senior Cup ==
The 1884–85 Manchester Cup was Newton Heath's first foray into that competition. The competition was geared towards teams in and around the Manchester area, a narrower focus than the Lancashire Cup, thus limiting the number of quality teams that Newton Heath would come up against. Therefore, although it displayed less ambition from the club, it also provided them with a more likely chance of silverware.

Their first opposition in the competition was Eccles, whom they beat 3–2 at North Road on 31 January 1885. However, Eccles appealed against the result, claiming that Newton Heath's third goal was invalid and should not have stood. The match was replayed two weeks later at Henrietta Street, Old Trafford, home of the Manchester Association club. This time, Newton Heath won the match 3–0, putting the result beyond doubt.

In the second round, the Heathens were pitted against the favourites for the cup, Manchester. However, despite being the home team and their status as favourites, Manchester were unable to compete with Newton Heath, who ran out 3–0 winners. The Railwaymen racked up another four goals in the semi-final against the team representing Dalton Hall of Owens College (which later become the Victoria University of Manchester), winning 4–3 to put them into their first ever final. Their opponents in the final, played at Whalley Range in south Manchester, were Hurst. The Heathens went into the game with high hopes, coming off the back of some high-scoring games in the earlier rounds, but ultimately lost 3–0.

Date	Round	Opponents	H / A	Result F–A	Scorers	Attendance
31 January 1885	Round 1	Eccles	H	3–2 (Note: Result annulled due to a disputed goal.)	Unknown	400
14 February 1885	Round 1 Replay	Eccles	N	3–0	T. Davies, Blears, Gotheridge	
7 March 1885	Round 2	Manchester Association	A	3–0	T. Davies, Jordan, Blears	
18 April 1885	Semi-finals	Dalton Hall Owens Col.	Hurst	4–3 (a.e.t.)	Howles, T. Davies (2), Earp	3,000
25 April 1885	Final	Hurst	Whalley Range	0–3		3,500
