= 1885–86 Newton Heath LYR F.C. season =

English football club season

Newton Heath LYR F.C.
1885–86 season
- President: Frederick Attock
- Stadium: North Road Ground
- Manchester Cup: Winners
Home colours

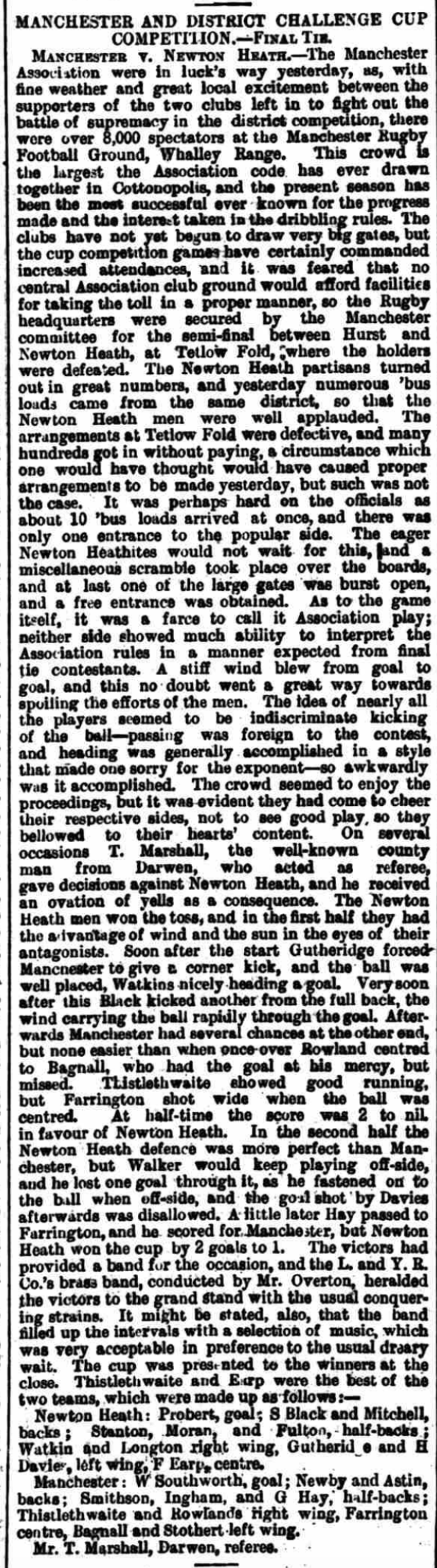
Report on the 1885–86 Manchester Senior Cup Final, The Umpire

The 1885–86 season was Newton Heath LYR's third season of competitive football. The only competition that the club entered their first team in this season was the Manchester Cup, a competition in which they had reached the final at the first attempt the previous season. It was a case of "second time lucky" for the Heathens, as they went one better in the 1886 competition, beating Manchester 2–1 in the final to claim the first trophy in the club's history.

The Lancashire Cup, which the club had entered and been soundly beaten in both of the two previous seasons, split into "Senior" and "Junior" competitions in 1885. Believing that the club's status was better suited to the Junior competition, the Heathens entered their reserve team for the 1885–86 season.

== Manchester and District Challenge Cup ==
After reaching the final of the Manchester Cup in 1884–85, the team would have been determined to go one better in 1885–86. Like the previous season, they were drawn at home to Eccles in the first round. Goals from Gotheridge and Watkins secured a 2–0 win for the Heathens and passage to the Second Round. Only the results of the Second and Third Round matches remain, with Newton Heath beating Gorton Villa 5–0 in the Second Round and Thornham 10–0 in the Third.

This set up a semi-final with Hurst to be played on a neutral venue in Salford. Gotheridge and Watkins were again on the scoresheet, Watkins getting a brace in a 3–1 win. As in the previous season, the final of the competition was played at Whalley Range, where Newton Heath were to play against Manchester Association F.C. A strong wind and the incline of the pitch aided Newton Heath in the first half, and they went into half-time 2–0 up, goals coming from Watkins and Sam Black. There was a certain amount of controversy about Watkins' goal, the Manchester Association players believing not only that Davies was offside before striking the original shot, but also that Watkins had diverted the ball into the net with his hand. Despite the Manchester Association appeals, the goal stood. Farrington scored a consolation goal for Manchester Association in the second half, but Newton Heath managed to hang on for the win, the first trophy in their history.

Date	Round	Opponents	H / A	Result F–A	Scorers	Attendance
19 December 1885	Round 1	Eccles	H	2–0	Gotheridge, Watkins	500
23 January 1886	Round 2	Gorton Villa	H	5–0	Unknown	"large"
13 February 1886	Round 3	Thornham	H	10–0	Unknown	1,800
13 March 1886	Semi-finals	Hurst	Salford	3–1	Gotheridge, Watkins (2)	6,000
3 April 1886	Final	Manchester Association	Whalley Range	2–1	Black, Watkins	8,000
