= Manchester United F.C. league record by opponent =

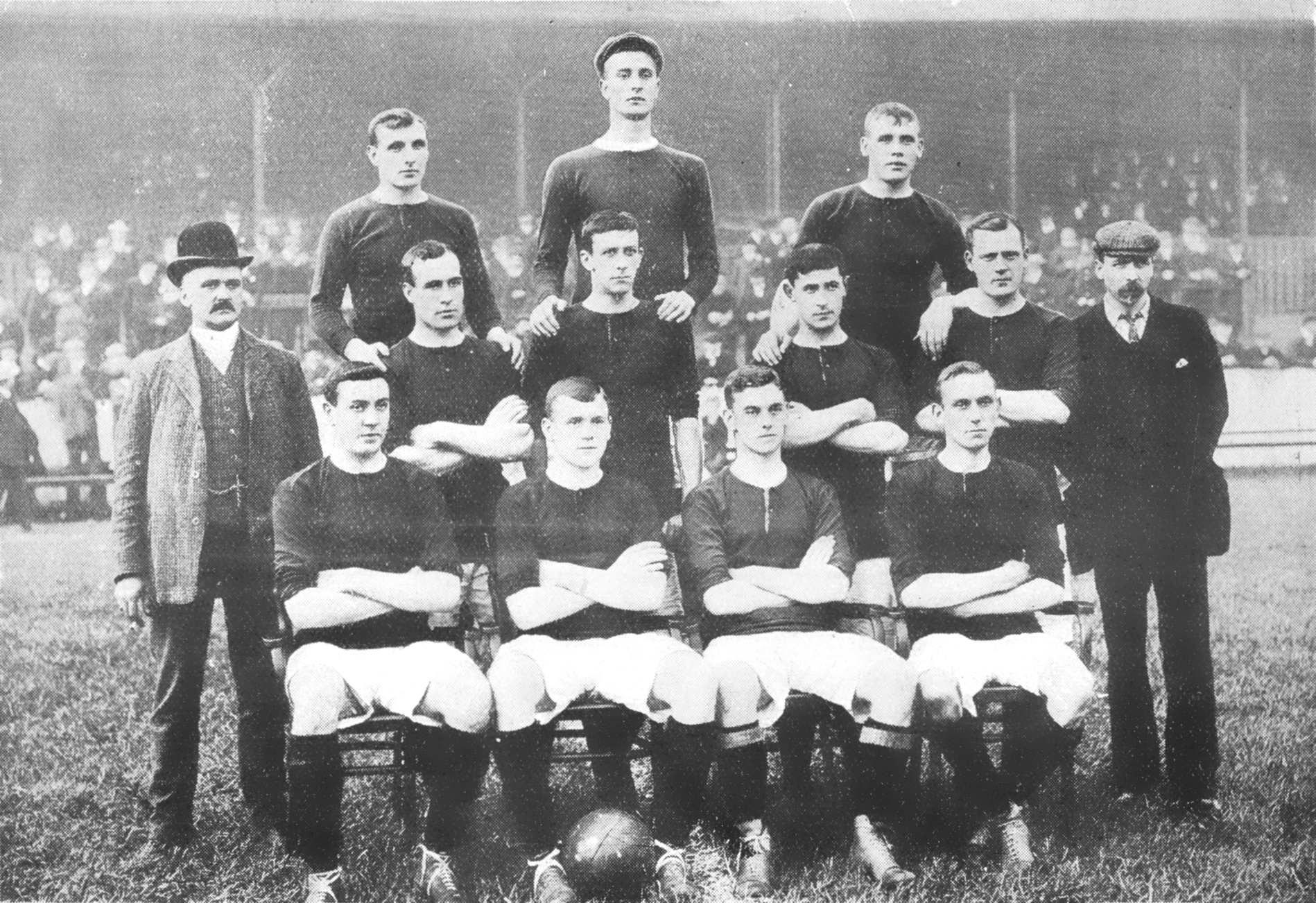
The Manchester United team at the start of the 1905–06 season, in which they were runners-up in the Second Division

Manchester United Football Club is an English association football club based in Old Trafford, Greater Manchester, that competes in the Premier League. Founded as Newton Heath LYR Football Club in 1878, the club changed its name to Manchester United in 1902. During the 1889–90 season, Manchester United joined the Football Alliance. The team was elected to The Football League in 1892, where the club remained until 1992, when the League's First Division was replaced as the top level of English football by the Premier League.

Manchester United's first team has competed in a number of nationally contested leagues, and its record against each club faced in these competitions is listed below. In total, Red Devils had 88 different league opponents.

The team that Manchester United has met most in league competition is Arsenal, against whom they have contested 214 league matches (as of the end of the 2025–26 season). In those games United have suffered 78 league defeats, which represents the most they have lost against any club, as well as conceded 301 goals – also club record. Manchester United have won more league matches (93) and scored more league goals (327) against Aston Villa than they have against any other club. Out of the 168 league matches between Manchester United and Chelsea, 54 have been drawn (32.1%) – more than with any other club.

== Key ==
- The records include the results of matches played in the Football Alliance (from 1889 to 1892), The Football League (from 1892 to 1992) and the Premier League (since 1992). Wartime matches are regarded as unofficial and are excluded, as are matches from the abandoned 1888–89 and 1939–40 seasons. Test Matches are not included.
- For the sake of simplicity, present-day names are used throughout: for example, results against Ardwick, Small Heath and Woolwich Arsenal are integrated into the records against Manchester City, Birmingham City and Arsenal, respectively.
- † Teams with this background and symbol in the "Club" column are competing in the 2026–27 Premier League alongside Manchester United.
- ‡ Clubs with this background and symbol in the "Club" column are defunct.
- Pld = matches played; W = matches won; D = matches drawn; L = matches lost; GF = Goals for; GA = Goals against; GD = Goal difference; Win% = percentage of total matches won

== All-time league records ==
As of 24 May 2026.

Manchester United league record by opponent
Club	Home				Away				Total								Ref(s)
Club	Pld	W	D	L	Pld	W	D	L	Pld	W	D	L	GF	GA	GD	Win%	Ref(s)
Accrington ‡	1	0	1	0	1	0	1	0	2	0	2	0	5	5	0	Win%	0.00
Arsenal †	107	59	30	18	107	27	20	60	214	86	50	78	319	301	18	40.19	(Note: Record against Woolwich Arsenal included.)
Aston Villa †	90	61	17	12	90	32	24	34	180	93	41	46	327	230	97	51.67	
Barnsley	16	13	2	1	16	6	7	3	32	19	9	4	64	21	43	59.38	
Birmingham City	47	30	8	9	47	13	19	15	94	43	27	24	138	101	37	45.74	(Note: Record against Small Heath included; record against Birmingham included.)
Birmingham St George's ‡	3	2	0	1	3	1	0	2	6	3	0	3	11	16	–5	50.00	
Blackburn Rovers	49	28	11	10	49	17	14	18	98	45	25	28	183	140	43	45.92	
Blackpool	41	27	8	6	41	18	9	14	82	45	17	20	156	98	58	54.88	
Bolton Wanderers	59	33	10	16	59	19	15	25	118	52	25	41	192	156	36	44.07	
Bootle ‡	3	3	0	0	3	0	1	2	6	3	1	2	11	11	0	50.00	
Bournemouth †	9	5	2	2	9	4	3	2	18	9	5	4	35	25	10	50.00	
Bradford City	23	15	6	2	23	7	7	9	46	22	13	11	78	37	41	47.83	
Bradford Park Avenue	9	5	0	4	9	3	1	5	18	8	1	9	30	36	–6	44.44	
Brentford †	10	7	1	2	10	3	2	5	20	10	3	7	37	35	2	50.00	
Brighton & Hove Albion †	13	9	1	3	13	6	1	6	26	15	2	9	43	30	13	56.00	
Bristol City	17	9	3	5	17	5	7	5	34	14	10	10	47	39	8	41.18	
Bristol Rovers	1	1	0	0	1	0	1	0	2	1	1	0	3	1	2	50.00	
Burnley	61	35	12	14	61	23	11	27	122	58	23	41	212	173	39	47.54	
Burton Swifts ‡	7	4	3	0	7	3	1	3	14	7	4	3	36	21	15	50.00	
Burton United ‡	6	5	1	0	6	3	2	1	12	8	3	1	29	10	19	66.67	
Burton Wanderers ‡	3	1	1	1	3	1	0	2	6	2	1	3	8	10	–2	33.33	
Bury ‡	19	9	2	8	19	10	5	4	38	19	7	12	58	46	12	50.00	
Cardiff City	15	6	6	3	15	9	2	4	30	15	8	7	59	42	17	50.00	
Charlton Athletic	28	20	5	3	28	15	6	7	56	35	11	10	113	59	54	62.50	
Chelsea †	84	35	30	19	84	32	24	28	168	67	54	47	265	204	61	39.88	
Chesterfield	10	10	0	0	10	3	1	6	20	13	1	6	41	22	19	65.00	(Note: Record against Chesterfield Town included.)
Coventry City †	37	23	8	6	37	16	8	13	74	39	16	19	124	70	54	52.70	
Crewe Alexandra	5	4	0	1	5	4	1	0	10	8	1	1	32	11	21	80.00	
Crystal Palace †	29	20	3	6	29	14	9	6	58	34	12	12	95	54	41	58.62	
Darwen ‡	8	6	1	1	8	2	2	4	16	8	3	5	35	22	13	50.00	
Derby County	45	24	10	11	45	12	17	16	90	36	27	27	157	136	21	40.00	
Doncaster Rovers	4	3	1	0	4	1	2	1	8	4	3	1	19	6	13	50.00	
Everton †	97	55	25	17	97	32	22	43	194	87	47	60	303	267	36	44.85	
Fulham †	40	32	5	3	40	18	12	10	80	50	17	13	158	85	73	62.50	
Gainsborough Trinity	10	8	2	0	10	5	3	2	20	13	5	2	36	14	22	65.00	
Glossop North End	7	6	1	0	7	5	1	1	14	11	2	1	34	10	24	78.57	(Note: Record against Glossop included.)
Grimsby Town	21	13	3	5	21	4	5	12	42	17	8	17	73	80	–7	40.48	
Huddersfield Town	23	13	9	1	23	7	7	9	46	20	16	10	85	64	21	43.48	
Hull City †	13	11	2	0	13	6	3	4	26	17	5	4	52	24	28	65.38	
Ipswich Town †	26	17	4	5	26	8	6	12	52	25	10	17	84	64	19	48.08	
Leeds City ‡	1	0	0	1	1	1	0	0	2	1	0	1	3	4	–1	50.00	
Leeds United †	50	23	18	9	50	18	17	15	100	41	35	24	148	108	40	41.00	
Leicester City	66	44	15	7	66	23	16	27	132	67	31	34	263	172	91	50.76	(Note: Record against Leicester Fosse included.)
Leyton Orient	6	3	3	0	6	3	1	2	12	6	4	2	18	8	10	50.00	(Note: Record against Clapton Orient included; record against Orient included.)
Lincoln City	15	11	3	1	15	4	1	10	30	15	4	11	62	42	20	50.00	
Liverpool †	93	45	29	19	93	26	23	43	186	71	53	62	251	255	–4	38.17	
Loughborough ‡	5	5	0	0	5	2	2	1	10	7	2	1	29	7	22	70.00	
Long Eaton Rangers ‡	1	1	0	0	1	1	0	0	2	2	0	0	6	1	5	100.00	
Luton Town	20	19	0	1	20	10	7	3	40	29	7	4	91	27	64	72.50	
Manchester City †	87	36	28	23	87	32	25	30	174	68	53	53	243	244	–1	39.08	(Note: Record against Ardwick included.)
Middlesbrough	52	31	10	11	52	22	12	18	104	53	22	29	186	152	34	50.96	
Millwall	6	5	1	0	6	3	2	1	12	8	3	1	28	7	21	66.67	
Nelson	1	0	0	1	1	1	0	0	2	1	0	1	2	1	1	50.00	
New Brighton Tower ‡	3	2	0	1	3	2	0	1	6	4	0	2	11	6	5	66.67	
Newcastle United †	86	53	22	11	86	31	19	36	172	84	41	47	322	246	76	48.84	
Northampton Town	1	1	0	0	1	0	1	0	2	1	1	0	7	3	4	50.00	
Norwich City	31	21	6	4	31	17	6	8	62	38	12	12	110	51	59	61.29	
Nottingham Forest †	52	31	11	10	52	17	13	22	104	48	24	32	192	140	52	46.15	
Notts County	24	11	9	4	24	9	5	10	48	20	14	14	74	60	14	41.67	
Oldham Athletic	18	11	3	4	18	6	6	6	36	17	9	10	74	45	29	47.22	
Oxford United	4	4	0	0	4	2	0	2	8	6	0	2	18	7	11	75.00	
Plymouth Argyle	6	4	1	1	6	2	1	3	12	6	2	4	20	20	0	50.00	
Port Vale	18	16	1	1	18	5	4	9	36	21	5	10	76	37	39	58.33	(Note: Record against Burslem Port Vale included.)
Portsmouth	29	20	3	6	29	8	10	11	58	28	13	17	91	60	31	48.28	
Preston North End	33	15	11	7	33	11	9	13	66	26	20	20	107	90	17	39.39	
Queens Park Rangers	22	18	3	1	22	10	7	5	44	28	10	6	82	42	40	63.64	
Reading	3	2	1	0	3	2	1	0	6	4	2	0	11	6	5	66.67	
Rotherham Town ‡	2	2	0	0	2	1	0	1	4	3	0	1	10	6	4	75.00	
Rotherham County ‡	1	1	0	0	1	0	1	0	2	1	1	0	4	1	3	50.00	
Sheffield United	47	29	6	12	47	15	10	22	94	44	16	34	161	135	26	46.81	
Sheffield Wednesday	59	37	15	7	59	15	12	32	118	52	27	39	197	161	36	44.07	(Note: Record against The Wednesday included.)
South Shields ‡	3	2	1	0	3	2	0	1	6	4	1	1	10	3	7	66.67	
Southampton	57	35	13	9	57	23	18	16	114	58	31	25	199	125	74	50.88	
Stockport County	9	7	2	0	9	2	0	7	18	9	2	7	29	18	11	50.00	
Stoke City	45	26	14	5	45	13	15	17	90	39	29	22	145	106	39	43.33	(Note: Record against Stoke included.)
Sunderland †	65	39	14	12	65	22	16	27	130	61	30	39	222	183	39	46.92	
Sunderland Albion ‡	2	1	0	1	2	0	0	2	4	1	0	3	6	10	–4	25.00	
Swansea City	15	11	3	1	15	4	3	8	30	15	6	9	51	32	19	50.00	(Note: Record against Swansea Town included.)
Swindon Town	1	1	0	0	1	0	1	0	2	1	1	0	6	4	2	50.00	
Tottenham Hotspur †	89	59	15	15	89	28	31	30	178	87	46	45	285	228	57	48.88	
Walsall	9	7	2	0	9	3	3	3	18	10	5	3	46	19	27	55.56	(Note: Record against Walsall Town Swifts included.)
Watford	14	11	3	0	14	7	2	5	28	18	5	5	49	29	20	64.29	
West Bromwich Albion	63	33	16	14	63	22	14	27	126	55	30	41	225	184	41	43.65	
West Ham United	70	47	10	13	70	18	21	31	140	65	31	44	249	174	77	46.43	
Wigan Athletic	8	8	0	0	8	7	0	1	16	15	0	1	50	5	45	93.75	
Wimbledon ‡	14	9	3	2	14	7	4	3	28	16	7	5	51	26	25	57.14	
Wolverhampton Wanderers	52	33	8	11	52	17	10	25	104	50	18	36	172	144	28	48.08	
York City	1	1	0	0	1	1	0	0	2	2	0	0	3	1	2	100.00	

== Overall record ==
As of match played on 24 May 2026

Manchester United F.C. overall league record by competition
Competition	Home				Away				Total							Win%	Ref(s)
Competition	Pld	W	D	L	Pld	W	D	L	Pld	W	D	L	GF	GA	GD	Win%	Ref(s)
Premier League	652	447	122	83	652	328	167	157	1,304	775	289	240	2,413	1,271	1,142	59.43	
Football League First Division	1,370	758	339	273	1,370	404	365	601	2,740	1,162	704	874	4,523	3,875	648	42.41	
Football League Second Division	408	278	71	59	408	128	97	183	816	406	168	242	1,433	966	467	49.75	
Football Alliance	33	19	7	7	33	9	5	19	66	28	12	26	146	132	14	42.42	
Total	2,463	1,502	539	422	2,463	869	634	960	4,926	2,371	1,173	1,382	8,515	6,244	2,271	48.13	
