= Edmund Lester =

English footballer

Personal information
- Position: Centre forward

Senior career*
Years	Team	Apps	(Gls)
18??–1898	Fleetwood Rangers		
1898–1899	Burnley	1	(0)
- * Club domestic league appearances and goals

Edmund Lester was an English professional footballer who played as a centre forward. He played for Lancashire League club Fleetwood Rangers before moving to Football League First Division side Burnley in March 1898. He played his only senior match for Burnley on 1 April 1899 in the 1–0 defeat away at Sheffield Wednesday. Lester left the club in May 1899, and his whereabouts thereafter are untraced.
