= 1883–84 Newton Heath LYR F.C. season =

English football club season

Newton Heath LYR F.C.
1883–84 season
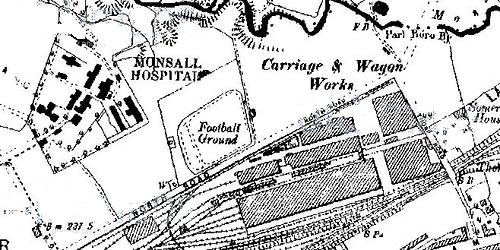
- Map showing the North Road football grounds in Clayton
- President: Frederick Attock
- Stadium: North Road Ground
- Lancashire Cup: First round
Home colours

The 1883–84 season was the first season in which Newton Heath Lancashire and Yorkshire Railway F.C. competed in a senior competitive football competition, having spent the first five years of their existence playing friendly matches against local clubs. The club entered the Lancashire Cup in October 1883, but were knocked out in the first round by Blackburn Olympic's reserve team.

== Lancashire Cup ==
For their first ever competitive match, Newton Heath were drawn at home to Blackburn Olympic in the first round of the Lancashire Cup. The opposition had won the FA Cup the previous season, beating Old Etonians in the final. However, they did not seem to be taking Newton Heath seriously, sending only their reserve team for the match, which was played on 27 October 1883. This gave the Heathens every chance of progressing to the next round, and indeed they were only 2–1 down at half-time. They then equalised shortly after the break, but were then hit by a barrage of goals, eventually losing the tie 7–2.

It is assumed that Newton Heath's North Road ground had become an enclosed structure by this point, as the club charged an entry fee of 3d. for entry.

Date	Round	Opponents	H / A	Result F–A	Scorers	Attendance
27 October 1883	Round 1	Blackburn Olympic	H	2–7	Unknown	

== Friendlies ==
Date	Opponents	H / A	Result F–A	Scorers	Attendance
6 October 1883	Astley Bridge 'A'	H	0–1	Unknown	
13 October 1883	Haughton Dale	H	2–2	Unknown	
20 October 1883	St. Helen's	A	3–2	Unknown	
1 December 1883	Manchester Arcadians	H	4–0	Unknown	
8 December 1883	Earlestown	A	0–8	Unknown	
5 January 1884	Bootle Wanderers	H	6–0	Unknown	
12 January 1884	Bentfield	A	1–1	Unknown	
19 January 1884	St. Helen's	H	3–1	Unknown	
26 January 1884	Haughton Dale	A	1–0 (Note: Match played 15 minutes each way.)	Unknown	
30 January 1884	St. Helen's	H	3–1	Latham, Morris, unknown	
2 February 1884	Greenheys	H	1–0	Unknown	
9 February 1884	Bootle Wanderers	A	1–1	Unknown	
23 February 1884	Blackburn Olympic XI	H	0–0	Unknown	
1 March 1884	Hurst Brook Olympic	A	1–3 (Note: Match abandoned after 30 minutes after the ball went in the river.)	own goal	
8 March 1884	Manchester Arcadians	A	4–0	Unknown	
15 March 1884	Astley Bridge Reserves	A	0–0	Unknown	
29 March 1884	Greenheys	A	1–5	Black	
