= William Gyves =

English footballer

Personal information
- Date of birth: July 1867
- Place of birth: Manchester, England
- Date of death: Unknown
- Position: Goalkeeper

Senior career*
Years	Team	Apps	(Gls)
1890–1891	Newton Heath LYR	0	(0)
Total		0	(0)
- * Club domestic league appearances and goals

William Gyves (born July 1867) was an English footballer. Born in Manchester, he played as a goalkeeper for Newton Heath LYR. He made his debut in an FA Cup second qualifying round match against Bootle on 25 October 1890; the first team had agreed to play in a friendly against Darwen the same day, so both sides agreed to use their reserve teams. Later in the season, he made another first-team appearance in the third round of the Manchester Senior Cup, a 2–2 draw at home to Hurst on 14 February 1891.
