= Hulme Athenaeum F.C. =

English association football club

Hulme Athenaeum
- Full name: Hulme Athenaeum Football Club
- Founded: 1863
- Dissolved: 1874
- Ground: Hullard Hall, Trafford
- Hon. Secretary: John Nall, Charles Barton
Home colours

Hulme Athenaeum F.C. was an English association football club from Manchester.

== History ==
The club was based at the Hulme Athenaeum, a clubhouse founded in 1860 by William Thackeray Marriott in order to improve the health of the working classes in the district. Members of the institution started the football club in November 1863 and bookkeeper John Nall became the club secretary, a post he held until 1870, by which time the club had 45 members. Within two years of its founding, the club was attracting members from Sale and Bowdon.

Unusually, the club did not charge members a joining fee, and had a 1 shilling nominal annual membership fee, which could be reduced in certain circumstances. The club was the first association football club in Manchester, and sometimes played under Sheffield rules. The club was associated with other sporting activities, and an early club captain, James Warrington, claimed tohave joined "for the sake of the gymnasium". Warrington was a gas rental collector, demonstrating that the club membership was working-class, whereas other clubs were based on public school backgrounds; in Manchester, ex-public school pupils played rugby football.

The club played every Saturday for its first five seasons, mostly games within the membership because of the lack of external opposition. The first match against external opposition was a 2–0 win over Longsight in November 1865, played in Belle Vue, and with 15 per side. Its last recorded game was to Sheffield rules, against regular opponents Garrick in January 1872.

The club folded in around 1873–4, perhaps because of a lack of external opposition; other than Sale, which only briefly played association football, and which the club only played twice (in 1866 and 1867), the only other association club in Lancashire by then was Turton F.C., founded in 1871. Many members joined Manchester Association F.C. on the latter's establishment in 1875.

== Colours ==
The club played in white, with blue trimmings.

== Ground ==
The club originally played at Hullard Hall, a quarter of a mile from Old Trafford railway station. Its final ground was on Moss Side.
