= Birch F.C. =

Defunct English football club

Birch
- Full name: Birch Football Club
- Founded: c. 1870
- Dissolved: 1890s
- Ground: Longsight Cricket Club

Birch F.C. was an English rugby and association football club from Rusholme, founded in around 1870 as a club playing originally just the association code.

== History ==
By 1878, the club mostly played rugby only, but in April 1878 played a friendly against Queen's Park because "it has lately been practising the dribbling as well as the Rugby game", due to a former Queen's Park player (James Strang) joining the club. The club entered the FA Cup the next season, but scratched when drawn at home to Darwen.

In October 1878, the association part of the club broke away to form Manchester Wanderers while the Birch club joined the Rugby Football Union. In 1881 Birch was a founder member of the Lancashire County Rugby Football Union.

The club ceased to exist in the 1890s.

== Ground ==
The club played at the Longsight Cricket Ground.

== Notable players ==
Thomas Slaney, the first Stoke City manager, guested for the team against Queen's Park.
