= Jack Powell (footballer, born 1860) =

Welsh footballer

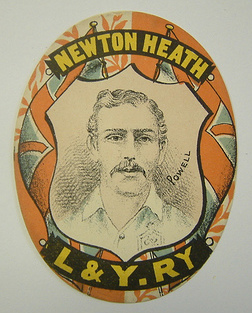

Personal information
- Date of birth: 25 March 1860
- Place of birth: Ffrwd, Wales
- Date of death: 16 March 1947 (aged 86)
- Place of death: Wrexham, Wales
- Height: 6 ft 2 in (1.88 m)
- Position: Full-back

Senior career*
Years	Team	Apps	(Gls)
1879–1883	Druids		
1883–1885	Bolton Wanderers		
1886–1891	Newton Heath	214	(49)

International career
1878–1888	Wales	15	(0)
- * Club domestic league appearances and goals

John Powell (25 March 1860 – 16 March 1947) was a Welsh footballer who played as a full-back for Newton Heath in the late 1880s.

Born in Ffrwd, near Wrexham, Powell began his football career with Druids in 1879, with whom he won the Welsh Cup three times and reached the final twice more. In October 1883, he joined Bolton Wanderers, becoming the first Welsh player to move to England in pursuit of a professional football career; however, professionalism was not legalised until July 1885, and he had to leave the club after 21 months. After moving to Manchester to become a fitter with the Lancashire and Yorkshire Railway at their carriage and wagon works in Newton Heath, he joined the company's football team and played in their first major competitive fixture, an FA Cup First round tie away to Fleetwood Rangers on 30 October 1886; the match finished in a 2–2 draw, but Newton Heath were eliminated after refusing to play extra time.

Powell quickly became the club's first-choice right-back and was made club captain in 1887. He played in all but one match in Newton Heath's first season of organised league football in 1888–89, when they were awarded The Combination title despite not all the teams having completed their fixture schedules. The following year, Newton Heath's first season in the Football Alliance, Powell and his fellow full-back John Mitchell switched sides, with Powell taking over at left-back. However, it proved to be Powell's last full season with the club, as he only played four more games in 1890–91, his final competitive appearance coming in the FA Cup second round qualifying defeat to Bootle Reserves on 25 October 1890. He was replaced as captain by George Evans, before retiring at the end of the season.

Over the span of his career, Powell made 15 appearances for Wales, five of them while with Newton Heath.

After his retirement from football, Powell continued to work for the Lancashire and Yorkshire Railway before becoming a pub licensee in Manchester and later Wrexham.
