= Harry Stafford =

English footballer

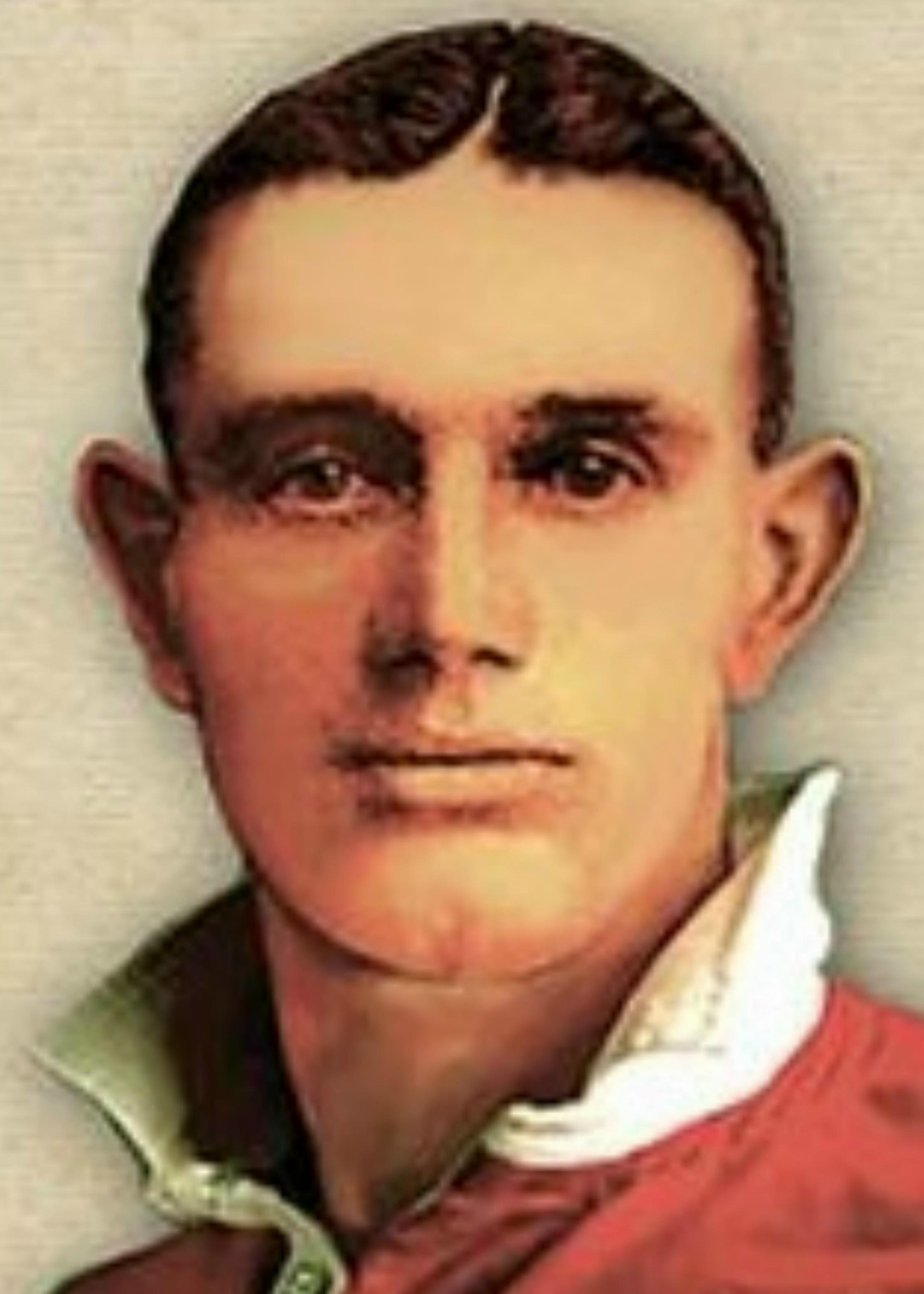

Personal information
- Date of birth: 29 November 1869
- Place of birth: Crewe, England
- Date of death: 24 October 1940 (aged 70)
- Place of death: Montreal, Canada
- Position: Defender

Senior career*
Years	Team	Apps	(Gls)
1890–1896	Crewe Alexandra	89	(2)
1896–1903	Newton Heath / Manchester United	184	(0)
Total		273	(2)
- * Club domestic league appearances and goals

Harry Stafford (1869–1940) was an English footballer who played a principal role in the formation of Manchester United Football Club. Born in Crewe, Cheshire, Stafford became a locomotive boilermaker employed by the London & North Western Railway (LNWR) at the expansive Crewe Works.

== With Crewe Alexandra ==
After some impressive displays for the Crewe Alexandra Hornets team, Stafford made his first-team debut on 22 September 1890, in a Football Alliance game against Birmingham St George's at Nantwich Road. He would go on to make over 150 appearances for the Railwaymen and become captain of the Cheshire county team. As a Crewe Alexandra player he won Cheshire Senior Cup winners medals in 1891–92 and 1892–93.

Beside his football career, Stafford was a capable athlete who ran various distances from the 100 yards to the half-mile. He was also an exceptional hurdler and represented the Crewe Alexandra Athletic Club for several years until turning professional with Newton Heath disqualified him from competing in amateur athletics.

== With Newton Heath ==
Stafford made his Heathens league debut in a 4–0 home win over Darwen on 3 April 1896 and immediately became the club's first-choice right-back. The following year he turned professional and was named club captain after Caesar Jenkyns was sold to Walsall. In 1900 he left the LNWR to become landlord of the Bridge House Inn, in Wrexham, North Wales.

In 1901 The Heathens were struggling financially and at the end of February held a four-day fundraising bazaar at the St James's Hall on Manchester's Oxford Street. After the show ended Stafford's dog, a St. Bernard he called The Major, went missing and by way of a restaurant manager named John Robert Thomas, came into the possession of the wealthy brewery owner John Henry Davies. Stafford was reunited with Major through a Lost & Found advert in the Manchester Evening News and refused a generous offer from Davies to buy the dog for his daughter. Despite this, J.H. Davies realised that the Newton Heath skipper was a popular character in North Manchester and in July 1901 Stafford became landlord of one of Davies's establishments, the Bridge Inn, in Ancoats.

On 6 March 1901 Newton Heath played New Brighton at Bank Street in Harry Stafford's five-year benefit match. The match was an evening kick-off and, fifty years before floodlights, was to be illuminated by Wells Lights, contraptions that generated gas from tar-oil. The ball had been gilded to make it more visible but unfortunately it was a particularly wet and windy night and the lights kept blowing out. As fast as they were re-lit others were extinguished and the match was abandoned after fifteen minutes.

== Birth of Manchester United ==
In January 1902, Newton Heath were served with a winding up order with debts in excess of £2,600 and despite the best efforts of Stafford, his team-mates and supporters, the club seemed doomed. The Heathens captain arranged a meeting with J.H. Davies and using Major as bait, got him involved with the club. In March 1902 Stafford took to the stage at the New Islington Hall during a supporters meeting and announced that himself and five local businessmen would each pledge £200 to save the club. A new committee was formed with J.H. Davies as president and his daughter Elsie was gifted a St Bernard dog for her twelfth birthday.

On 26 April 1902 Stafford captained Newton Heath in their last ever game, a 2–1 win in the Manchester Senior Cup final against Manchester City at Hyde Road. It was his only winners medal in his time at Bank Street. On the same day the club announced the change of name to Manchester United Football Club.

Harry Stafford and secretary James West were put in charge of football affairs making Stafford in effect club captain/manager/director. This meant that as a board member he would have no option but to revert to amateur status.

On 7 February 1903 Stafford became the first Manchester United player to be sent off, in an FA Cup tie against Liverpool at Bank Street. The following month he made his final first-team appearance for Manchester United in a home game versus Lincoln City.

== After retirement from football ==
In December 1904 Harry Stafford and James West were each suspended by the FA for two and a half years, after pleading guilty to making illegal payments to players and failing to keep the club's books in order. Stafford resigned his seat on the board and became landlord of the Imperial Hotel on Manchester's Piccadilly approach; a public house that in December 1907 hosted the birth of the footballers union the AFPU, the forerunner of today's PFA. After his ban he continued to act as a scout for the club and is recognised as the club's first 'fixer'.

After United's FA Cup win in 1909, Stafford left Manchester and MUFC minutes for 19 September 1911 state that he was awarded £50 by the club to assist with his emigration to Australia. The following month he sailed for Boston, Massachusetts on the SS Devonian, before travelling to Schenectady in NY State, where he began work as a boilermaker at the American Locomotive Company.

In 1917 Stafford moved to Quebec after obtaining the position of boiler inspector at the Montreal Locomotive Works but during the Great Depression lost his job and struggled financially throughout most of the 1930s. On 24 October 1940, contrary to reports that he had made a fortune as a hotelier, Harry Stafford died penniless at home on Erie Street, Montreal. His remains are interred in an unmarked grave in Mount Royal Cemetery, plot number G 733-L.

== Senior career ==
Year	Teams	FL2	FAC	FAll	FAA	CSC	LSC	MSC	Total
1890–1896	Crewe Alexandra	89 (2)	21(1)	35	3	10	–	–	158 (3)
1896–1903	Newton Heath / Manchester United	184	17 (1)	–	–	–	11	9	221 (1)

1903 – 1904 Stafford played in one Birmingham & District League game for Crewe Alexandra v Druids of Ruabon before announcing his retirement as a player.

FL2 = Football League Division 2. FAC = FA Cup. FAll – Football Alliance. FAA = FA Amateur Cup. CSC = Cheshire Senior Cup. LSC = Lancashire Senior Cup. MSC = Manchester Senior Cup. Goals scored in brackets.

Sporting positions
Preceded by Caesar Jenkyns	Newton Heath/Manchester United captain 1897–1903	Succeeded by John Willie Sutcliffe
