= Mossley F.C. =

Association football club in Northern Ireland

Mossley
- Full name: Mossley Football Club
- Founded: 1949
- Ground: Mossley Recreation Grounds
- League: Premier Division

Mossley Football Club, formerly Mossley Young Men, is a Northern Irish, intermediate football club playing in Premier Division of the Northern Amateur Football League. The club is based in Newtownabbey, County Antrim, and was formed in 1949. The club plays in the Irish Cup.
