= West Manchester F.C. =

Defunct football club in England

West Manchester
- Full name: West Manchester Football Club
- Nickname: The West
- Founded: 1884
- Dissolved: 1897
- Ground: Hullard Hall, Brooks's Bar
Original colours	1890–97 colours

The West Manchester Football Club was an English association club based in Trafford, west of Manchester.

== History ==
The club was founded in 1884, out of a bicycle club that was based at Brooks's Bar. The club was a founder member of the Manchester Football Association. The club's first reported match was a 3–3 draw against Haughton Dale in October 1884.

=== Manchester Senior Cup success ===
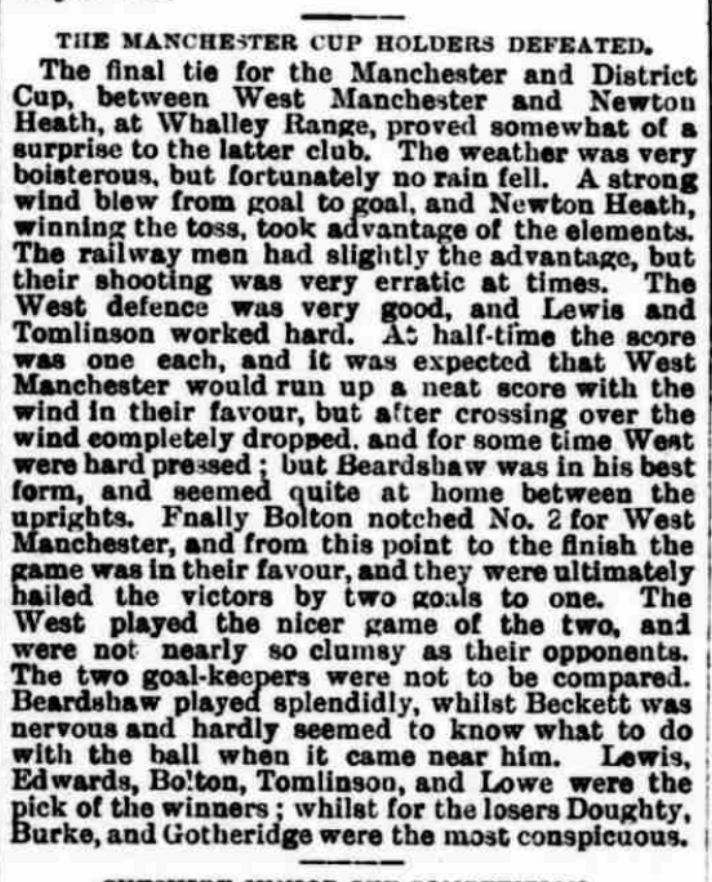
1886–87 Manchester Senior Cup Final, West Manchester 2–1 Newton Heath, Athletic News, 26 April 1887

In 1887 the club won the Manchester Senior Cup. The club twice had to replay ties which it had won. In the First Round, West Manchester beat Denton F.C. 2–0, in extra time, before 5000 spectators at their Brooks's Bar ground. A replay was ordered (because West Manchester had originally refused to play extra-time) at Pendleton Olympic and this time they won 3–0.

In the second round, the club beat Manchester F.C. 5–2, but was disqualified because some of its players did not meet residency requirements; on appeal, the Manchester FA ordered a replay. Manchester F.C. refused to participate, so West Manchester went through to the Quarter Final, beating Stalybridge St George's 14–0.

West Manchester then beat Hurst 2–0 in the Semi-Final, the result considered "a bit of a fluke", before coming from behind to beat Newton Heath 2–1 in the Final with goals from Tomlinson and Bolton, in what was both considered a surprise and against the run of play.

=== FA Cup and Lancashire League ===
The following season the club entered the FA Cup for the first time, drawn away to Fleetwood Rangers in the First Round. At 3pm, the time of the scheduled kick-off, the club had not arrived, so Fleetwood kicked off, scored, and claimed the tie. West Manchester arrived at 4pm and Fleetwood Rangers agreed to play, but only under protest as they had already claimed the tie. The point was moot as Rangers came from behind to win 4–1. The club suffered a blow late in the season, after protests and counter-protests in relation to a quarter-final Lancashire Junior Cup tie with fierce rival Denton, which West had won 5–2 in a replay at Denton, the upshot being both clubs were disqualified, and West's J. Lowe suspended for not fulfilling the local residency requirement - the sole consolation for West was that the Lancashire FA ordered Denton to pay half of the replay gate money (£52) to West, which Denton was claiming as "stand money".

West Manchester made only one appearance in the main draw of the FA Cup competition. In the 1888–89 FA Cup qualifying rounds, the club appeared to have caused a major shock, by beating Bolton Wanderers (albeit their reserve side) in the Second Round; the match had ended 0–0, but the referee ordered the clubs to play 30 minutes of extra time. However it was called off because of darkness after 24 mins, with West Manchester 1–0 up. Bolton protested, chiefly on the grounds that the reason for the match not finishing was due to West Manchester's late arrival, and the FA ordered a replay at Bolton. At the second time of asking, Bolton Wanderers won 9–0, although this time West Manchester had also sent their Reserve side, then known as the "Swifts", as like the Wanderers, the first XI was engaged in league action.

When the Football League, the Combination, and the Football Alliance all started, West Manchester did not apply to join any of them, unlike rival clubs Newton Heath and Ardwick. As both clubs were accepted into national competitions, West Manchester focussed on the regional game, and joined the Lancashire League. The club rarely finished in the top half and with the focus on the national game, playing in a regional league as a professional club proved impossible. In its final season (1896–97) the club struggled to field a team - and in the final match with Stockport County, West Manchester could only field 10 men.

After one final friendly match, post to the club secretary was being returned as unclaimed, and the club was de facto defunct.

== Colours ==
The club originally played in white. At the start of the 1888–89 season the club adopted black and white vertically striped shirts, and by 1890–91 it had adopted red and white stripes, retaining the plain white as a change jersey.

== Ground ==
The club played at the Hullard Hall ground, at Brooks's Bar in the Old Trafford area of Manchester for its entire existence.
