= Manchester Association F.C. =

Defunct football club in England

Manchester
- Full name: Manchester Association Football Club
- Founded: 1875
- Dissolved: 1888
- Ground: Hullard Hall
Manchester Association colours	Manchester Wanderers colours

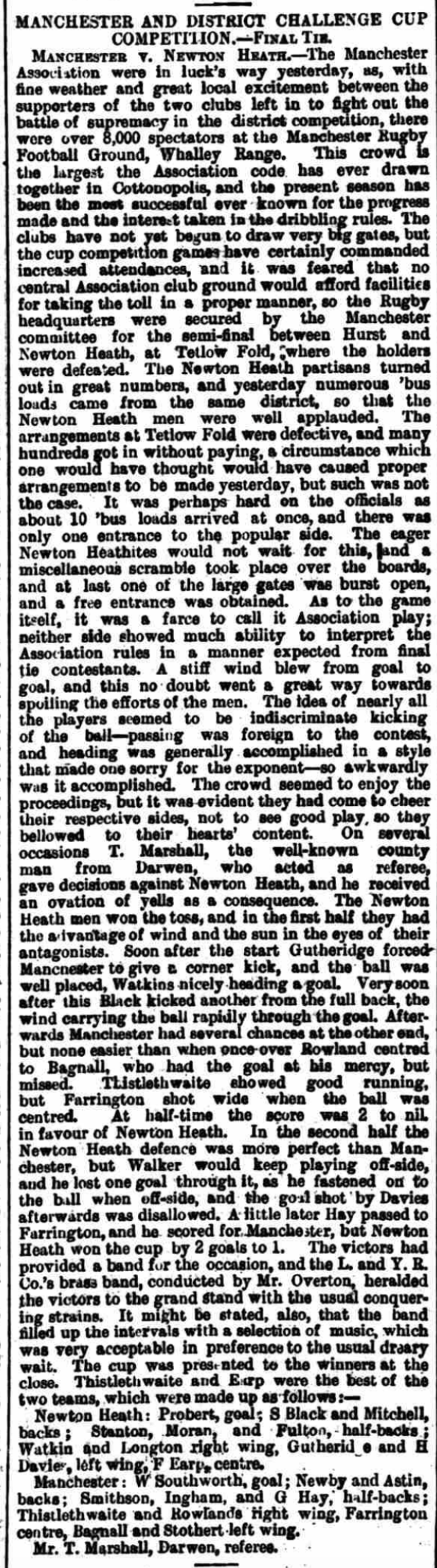
1885–86 Manchester Senior Cup Final, Newton Heath 2–1 Manchester Association, The Umpire, 4 April 1886

Manchester Association Football Club was an English association football club from Eccles, Lancashire, founded in 1875 in order to revive the association game in Manchester.

== History ==
The instigator of the club was a former Nottingham Forest player, Fitzroy Norris, and the new club included a number of men who had been active with the former Hulme Athenaeum club. The first practice session took place in November 1875 and its first match was against students at Liverpool University in January 1876.

The club first entered the FA Cup in 1877–78, losing at Darwen by a score of 3–0 or 4–1; Manchester had started the match with only nine men, and two goals in the match were disputed, but, given the result was not in doubt, the clubs did not submit a request to the Football Association for arbitration.

=== Manchester Wanderers ===
In October 1878, Birch F.C. split its footballing section from its rugby football section, and the football side started playing under the name Manchester Wanderers at Brooks's Bar in Whalley Range. Under its new guise, the club took part in the first Lancashire Senior Cup, and won through to the fourth round stage (owing to the lopsided nature of the draw, made up of 5 clubs). At that stage however the club was drawn to visit the competition favourites, Darwen; it took the lead in the tie, thanks to a Brindle own goal, but Darwen soon took control, and won 11–1, the home side having two goals disallowed. Goalkeeper Massey was "repeatedly cheered for his capital play".

In 1879, Association and Wanderers merged, playing under the Manchester Wanderers name at Brooks's Bar until 1882, when the club reverted to Manchester Association.

The Manchester Wanderers name was revived in 1891 and this team eventually folded in 1903.

=== Post-merger ===
In 1883–84, the club beat Stoke in the first round of the FA Cup, thanks to an early example of man-marking; full-back Walker and half-back Sumner "appearing to have received special instructions to look after" the Stoke forward Ted Wilson, who had starred for Cambridge University, and the two centre-forwards Newby and Bassett "had orders to keep Johnson [Stoke centre-forward] as quiet as possible". In the second round, Manchester became the first English club to play a Cup tie in Scotland, when drawn away to Queen's Park. However, in front of nearly 3,000 spectators, the club went down to a 15–0 defeat, seven goals coming in the first half-an-hour. McCallum in the Queen's Park goal did not touch the ball with his hands; nevertheless the teams dined together after the match. It was the club's last FA Cup appearance; as most clubs turned professional, the Association remained amateur and "gentlemanly".

The club was a founder member of the Manchester Football Association and reached the final of the Manchester Cup in 1885–86, losing to Newton Heath L&YR. It continued into 1887–88, but lost 11–0 at home to Blackburn Rovers in the first round of the Lancashire Senior Cup in October, watched by a large number of spectators.

The club resigned from the Manchester FA in 1887, following a series of protests and counter-protests in relation to the Manchester Senior Cup by and against West Manchester, and that seems to have taken the heart out of the club. The last recorded match for the club was a 7–3 home defeat to the Blackburn Bohemians in April 1888;

== Colours ==
The club's original colours were scarlet and black hoops, bought from a Deansgate outfitter. By 1876 they had changed to blue and French grey "harlequin" pattern (quarters) shirts, with white shorts and blue stockings.

In 1880, when playing under the name Manchester Wanderers, the club wore white, and in 1884 adopted Oxford and Cambridge blue jerseys, but by 1887 at the latest the club was wearing blue and white quartered shirts and white shorts.

== Ground ==
The club originally played at a ground near Eccles railway station, but in 1877–78 moved to Brooks's Bar. From September 1884 they played at a new purpose-built ground, known as Hullard Hall, just off Chester Road. The ground had four stands and a pavilion and was later taken over by West Manchester.

== Notable players ==
- R. G. Barlow, who kept goal for the club in the early 1880s.
- Richard Turner, who left the club for Bolton Association in 1883, and who won the FA Cup with Blackburn Rovers in 1885
