= James Gotheridge =

English footballer

Personal information
- Date of birth: 1863
- Place of birth: Derby, England
- Date of death: Unknown
- Position: Outside left

Senior career*
Years	Team	Apps	(Gls)
1884–1889	Newton Heath	14	(3)
1889–????	West Manchester		
- * Club domestic league appearances and goals

James Gotheridge (born 1863) was an English footballer who played as a left winger for Newton Heath in the late 1880s. He signed for the Heathens as a 21-year-old in 1884 but made only 37 competitive appearances for the club. In October 1889, Gotheridge was suspended by the Football Association for three months for an incident during a match against Walsall Town Swifts. He played one more match for the club before being transferred to West Manchester.
