= Jack Doughty =

English-born Welsh footballer

Personal information
- Full name: John Doughty
- Date of birth: October 1865
- Place of birth: Bilston, Staffordshire, England
- Date of death: April 1937 (aged 71)
- Place of death: Manchester, England
- Position: Forward

Senior career*
Years	Team	Apps	(Gls)
1882–1886	Druids		
1886–1892	Newton Heath	39	(17)
1892–?	Hyde		
- Fairfield
- Manchester Welsh

International career
1886–1890	Wales	8	(6)
- * Club domestic league appearances and goals

John Doughty (October 1865 – April 1937) was a Welsh footballer who played as a forward. Born in Bilston, Staffordshire, to an Irish father and a Welsh mother, Doughty started his football career with Druids before joining Newton Heath in June 1886. He was in the Heathens team that first joined the Football Alliance in the 1889–90 season, and made his debut on 30 October 1886 against Fleetwood Rangers in the FA Cup. He left Newton Heath in 1891.

Doughty made his debut for the Wales national team in 1886, in a match against Scotland. He scored four goals in one match for Wales in a game against Ireland national football team in March 1888, a match in which his brother Roger, also a Newton Heath player, scored two goals. In total, Doughty only played eight times for Wales.

== See also ==
- List of Wales international footballers born outside Wales
