= Tom Burke (footballer, born 1862) =

Welsh footballer (1863–1914)

Personal information
- Full name: Thomas Burke
- Date of birth: 1863
- Place of birth: Wrexham, Denbighshire, Wales
- Date of death: February 1914 (aged 50–51)
- Place of death: Prestwich, Lancashire, England
- Position: Wing half

Senior career*
| Years | Team | Apps | (Gls) |
| ?–1882 | Wrexham Grosvenor | | |
| 1882–1884 | Wrexham February | | |
| 1884–? | Wrexham Olympic | | |
| ?–1886 | Liverpool Cambrian | | |
| 1886–1890 | Newton Heath LYR | 0 | (0) |
| 1890–1891 | Wrexham Victoria | | |

International career
| 1883–1888 | Wales | 8 | (1) |
- Denbighshire
- * Club domestic league appearances and goals

Thomas Burke (1863–1914) was a Welsh international footballer who played for Wrexham Olympic and Newton Heath LYR. Burke won a total of eight caps for Wales, playing at half-back.

Burke began his career with Wrexham Grosvenor, but moved on to Wrexham February and Wrexham Olympic before making a transfer to Liverpool Cambrians. From there, he was signed by Newton Heath in 1886. The club's parent company, the Lancashire and Yorkshire Railway, was able to employ Burke as a painter – as was his trade – at the nearby Carriage and Wagon Works, from which the club had been born. In his first season at Newton Heath, Burke played mostly at left-half, but switched to right-half by the following season, and even played at centre-half or inside-right on occasion.

When Burke's time at Newton Heath came to an end, after making 29 appearances for the Heathens, he moved back to Wrexham to play for Wrexham Victoria.

He died in 1914 at the age of 50 as a result of lead poisoning.
