= Roger Doughty =

Welsh footballer

Personal information
- Full name: Roger Doughty
- Date of birth: 1868
- Place of birth: Cannock Chase, Staffordshire, England
- Date of death: 19 December 1914 (aged 45–46)
- Place of death: Manchester, England
- Positions: Outside left; right-back

Senior career*
Years	Team	Apps	(Gls)
- Druids
	Newton Heath L&YR	66	(10)
- Fairfield
- West Manchester
	Newton Heath	0	(0)

International career
1888	Wales	2	(2)
- * Club domestic league appearances and goals

Roger Doughty (1868 – 19 December 1914) was a Welsh footballer who played as an outside left for Druids before joining Newton Heath in June 1886. He was part of the Heathens' team that joined the Football Alliance in 1889, but left in 1892. He returned for one season in 1896–97.

Although he was born in Cannock Chase, Staffordshire, to an Irish father and a Welsh mother, Doughty played for the Welsh national team. He made his debut in a match against Ireland in March 1888, a match in which his brother Jack also played. Wales won the match 11–0, with the Doughty brothers scoring six of the goals between them; Roger scored two of the goals, Jack scored four.

He died in Manchester on 19 December 1914.

== See also ==
- List of Wales international footballers born outside Wales
