= Denton F.C. =

Denton
- Full name: Denton Football Club
- Nickname: the Hatters
- Founded: 1880
- Dissolved: 1916
- Ground: Chapel House Ground
19th century colours	20th century colours

Denton F.C. was an English association football club from Denton, east Manchester.

== History ==
Although the club claimed a formation date of 1880, the first recorded match is from the 1883–84 season, a 5–1 defeat to fellow Mancunian club Greenheys.

=== FA Cup entries ===
The club first entered the FA Cup in 1887–88, the last season before the introduction of qualifying rounds. Denton was drawn to play South Shore but could not use two of its best players because they had not met the residency requirements for that year's competition. Rather than play with a weakened side, on the day of the tie, Denton scratched, and played the match as a friendly instead, South Shore winning 2–1.

Denton only entered the competition twice more, in 1889–90 and 1890–91, both times losing to Gorton Villa in the first qualifying round.

=== The Combination ===
In 1890, the club was a founder member of the second incarnation of the Combination, a league that operated as a regional third-tier competition, after the Football League and Football Alliance. In its first season, Denton came 5th out of 9. However, in 1891–92, Denton finished bottom, with only 2 wins in 22 matches, and were "rejected" from the competition.

=== Lower league football ===
The club had more success at a lower level. In 1905–06 the Hatters won the Manchester League, but decided not to apply to join the next higher tier, the Lancashire Combination.

In 1906–07, the club won the Manchester Junior Cup and the Healy Charity Cup, but suffered a loss of £20. The club was showing some ambition by signing more players, including former Glossop player Barlow, and at the end of 1908–09 finally applied to join the Lancashire Combination. The Hatters in fact remained in the Manchester League for 1909–10 and only joined the Combination in 1910–11. However the move was not a success, the club only twice finishing in the top half, and the club did not re-emerge after World War 1. Its last appearance was in the wartime Lancashire League Southern Division in 1915–16; the club finished bottom with 6 points.

== Colours ==
The earliest club colours were described as red and white, probably referring to the shirts and shorts rather than a pattern. By 1902 the club was wearing chocolate and blue stripes and by 1911–12 plain blue, which in 1913 it changed to red and black stripes.

== Ground ==
The club played at the Chapel House Ground at Chapel Green, near the Chapel House Hotel.
