= Manchester Senior Cup =

Manchester FA Senior Cup
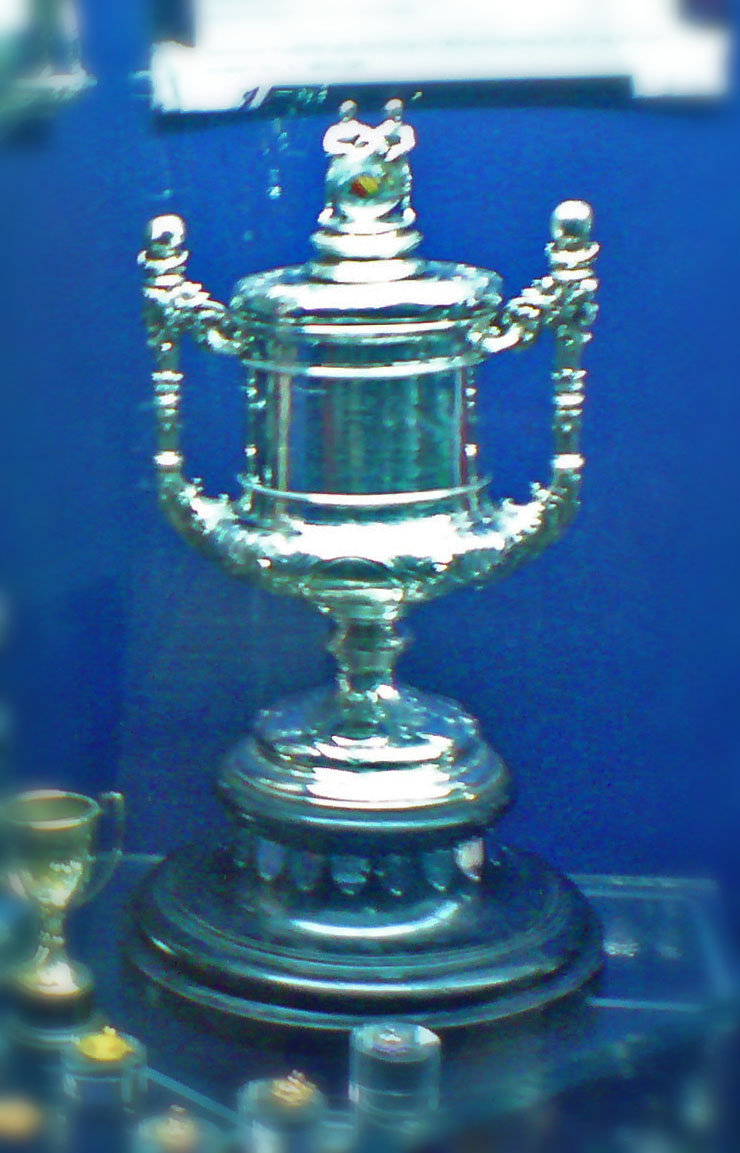
- The Manchester Senior Cup.
- Founded: 1885
- Region: Greater Manchester
- Teams: Various
- Current champions: Bolton Wanderers U21; 2014/15 (10th title)
- Most championships: Manchester United (33 titles)
- Website: Manchester FA

The Manchester FA Senior Cup (originally known as the Manchester and District Challenge Cup, later the Manchester Cup) is an annual football tournament held between the clubs of the Manchester Football Association which was first played in 1885; the first winners were Hurst who beat Newton Heath LYR in the final. As of 2025, the competition has been on hiatus since the 2015/16 season was abandoned due to the Final not being able to be arranged.

== Organisation ==
The competition featured the major professional clubs of the Manchester area — Manchester United (as Newton Heath LYR until 1892 and Newton Heath until 1902), Manchester City (as well as Ardwick until 1894), Bolton Wanderers, Bury, Oldham Athletic, and Stockport County — until 1970, after which only non-league clubs entered. The Senior Cup was not held from 1979 to 1998, but was reintroduced as a reserve team tournament for the six professional clubs, typically in round-robin format with a final usually held at the end of the season in early May.

The overall winners table is as follows

Team	Wins	Notes
Manchester United	33	including 4 as Newton Heath LYR and 2 as Newton Heath
Manchester City	13	plus two shared with Bury
Bury	12	plus two shared with Manchester City
Bolton Wanderers	10	
Oldham Athletic	9	
Stockport County	4	
Droylsden	3	
Ardwick	2	
Mossley	2	
Hurst	1	the original Hurst club
West Manchester	1	
Crewe Alexandra	1	
Wigan Borough	1	
Hyde United	1	
Ashton United	1	
Dukinfield Town	1	

In 2021, a medal from the competition won by Newton Heath's Tommy Fitzsimmons in 1893, believed to be the oldest such item relating to Manchester United to have been offered for sale, was auctioned for £24,000.

== Finals ==
This section lists every final of the competition played since the first final in 1885 where known; including the winners, the runners-up, and the result.

=== Key ===
Match went to a replay
Shared trophy
Final was played over 2 legs

=== 1884-1915 ===
Season	Winner	Result	Runner-up	Date	Venue	Attendance	Notes
1884–85	Hurst	3–0	Newton Heath LYR	Saturday 25 April 1885	Whalley Range (Manchester FC Rugby)	around 3500	This is the original Hurst club that folded in 1892. The 2nd half was delayed due to heavy rainfall. HT 0-0
1885–86	Newton Heath LYR	2–1	Manchester Association	Saturday 3 April 1886	Whalley Range (Manchester FC Rugby)	around 8000	The largest crowd ever for association football in Manchester at the time. HT 2-0
1886–87	West Manchester	2–1	Newton Heath LYR	Saturday 23 April 1887	Whalley Range (Manchester FC Rugby)	around 4000	HT 1-1
1887–88	Newton Heath LYR	7–1	Denton	Saturday 28 April 1888	Whalley Range (Manchester FC Rugby)	around 8000	
1888–89	Newton Heath LYR	7–0	Hooley Hill	Saturday 27 April 1889	Whalley Range (Manchester FC Rugby)	around 4000	
1889–90	Newton Heath LYR	5–2	Royton	Saturday 3 May 1890	Hullard Hall (West Manchester FC)	around 2000	
1890–91	Ardwick	1–0	Newton Heath LYR	Saturday 18 April 1891	Hullard Hall (West Manchester FC)	around 10000	
1891–92	Ardwick	4–1	Bolton Wanderers	Saturdaty 23 April 1892	North Road (Newton Heath LYR)	around 7000	
1892–93	Newton Heath	2–1	Bolton Wanderers	Saturday 15 April 1893	Hyde Road (Ardwick AFC)	around 8000	
1893–94	Bury	4–2	Heywood Central	Saturday 7 April 1894	Hyde Road (Ardwick AFC)	around 5000	HT 0-2
1894–95	Bolton Wanderers	0–0	Bury	Saturday 30 March 1895	Bank Street (Newton Heath FC)	around 7000	
	Bolton Wanderers	REPLAY; 3–2	Bury	Monday 8 April 1895	Hyde Road (Manchester City FC)	around 4000	
1895–96	Bury	2–1	Manchester City	Saturday 11 April 1896	Bank Street (Newton Heath FC)	around 12000	
1896–97	Bury	3–1	Bolton Wanderers	Saturday 3 April 1897	Hyde Road (Manchester City FC)	around 10000	The Official History of Bury FC book reports that this game finished 3-0
1897–98	Stockport County	VOID; 0–4	Manchester City	Saturday 9 April 1898	Fallowfield Stadium (Manchester Athletics Club)	around 25000	The tie was voided and re-played due to Manchester City fielding an ineligible player (Douglas).
	Stockport County	2–1	Manchester City	Monday 18 April 1898	Bank Street (Newton Heath FC)		Gate receipts for both ties combined £464 12s 11d
1898–99	Stockport County	2–2	Bury	Wednesday 12 April 1899	Hyde Road (Manchester City FC)	around 2000	
	Stockport County	REPLAY; 2–1	Bury	Saturday 29 April 1899	Bank Street (Newton Heath FC)	around 3000	
1899–00	Bury	2–0	Bolton Wanderers	Wednesday 4 April 1900	Hyde Road (Manchester City FC)	around 4000	
1900–01	Manchester City	4–0	Newton Heath	Monday 29 April 1901	Hyde Road (Manchester City FC)	around 5000	
1901–02	Newton Heath	2–1	Manchester City	Saturday 26 April 1902	Hyde Road (Manchester City FC)	between 10000 and 15000	This was the last match for Newton Heath before they renamed to Manchester United
1902–03	Bury	2-2; AET	Manchester City	Wednesday 29 April 1903	Bank Street (Manchester United FC)	around 15000	Both teams were declared joint winners with both receiving gold medals. It was agreed until the following September, when the game may have been re-played. However, it was not and so both were officially joint winners. Gate receipts £444 3s 6d.
1903–04	Bury	0–0	Manchester City	Saturday 30 April 1904	Hyde Road (Manchester City FC)	around 18000	
	Bury	REPLAY; POSTPONED	Manchester City	Monday 17 October 1904	Bank Street (Manchester United FC)		Postponed due to Manchester City being banned from playing additional games for a month
	Bury	REPLAY; POSTPONED	Manchester City	Monday 28 November 1904	Bank Street (Manchester United FC)		Postponed due to fog
	Bury	REPLAY; 4-2; ABANDONED	Manchester City	Monday 5 December 1904	Bank Street (Manchester United FC)	around 3000	HT 3-0. Abandoned on 84 mins due to darkness. Although the victory was stated as morally Bury's, the result did not stand and no further replay was arranged. Hence the Cup was again shared between the two clubs The Official History of Bury FC book incorrectly states that the game was abandoned at 4-0 with the result allowed to stand
1904–05	Bury	3–1	Manchester United	Saturday 29 April 1905	Hyde Road (Manchester City FC)	around 5000	HT 1-0. The Official History of Bury FC book incorrectly states that the game was at Gigg Lane
1905–06	Bolton Wanderers	3–0	Bury	Monday 30 April 1906	Bank Street (Manchester United FC)	around 2500	
1906–07	Manchester City	2–0	Stockport County	Monday 29 April 1907	Hyde Road (Manchester City FC)	around 10000	
1907–08	Manchester United	1–0	Bury	Thursday 30 April 1908	Hyde Road (Manchester City FC)	around 3000	
1908–09	Bolton Wanderers	POSTPONED	Stockport County	Monday 26 April 1909	Hyde Road (Manchester City FC)		
	Bolton Wanderers	3–0	Stockport County	Thursday 29 April 1909	Hyde Road (Manchester City FC)	"poor"	
1909–10	Manchester United	2–0	Stockport County	Wednesday 20 April 1910	Old Trafford (Manchester United FC)	800	
1910–11	Manchester City	3–1	Manchester United	Weednesday 14 December 1910	Hyde Road (Manchester City FC)	around 6000	
1911–12	Manchester United	0–0	Rochdale	Wednesday 27 March 1912	Hyde Road (Manchester City FC)		
	Manchester United	REPLAY; 1–1	Rochdale	Tuesday 30 April 1912	Boundary Park (Oldham Athletic AFC)	around 5000	KO 6.00pm
	Manchester United	REPLAY-2; 5–0	Rochdale	Tuesday 17 September 1912	Gigg Lane (Bury FC)	around 2000	
1912–13	Manchester United	4–1	Bolton Wanderers	Monday 21 April 1913	Hyde Road (Manchester City FC)	around 3000	
1913–14	Oldham Athletic	1–0	Hurst	Tuesday 21 April 1914	Bower Fold (Stalybridge Centic FC)	between 6000 and 7000	Had been originally due to be played at Manchester City's Hyde Road
1914–15	Stockport County	4–3; AET	Rochdale	Saturday 1 May 1915	Hyde Road (Manchester City FC)		After 90 mins was 1-1

The competition was not held between 1915 and 1919 due to World War I

=== 1919-1939 ===
Season	Winner	Result	Runner-up	Date	Venue	Attendance	Notes
1919–20	Manchester United	1-0	Oldham Athletic	Monday 10 May 1920	Hyde Road (Manchester City FC)		
1920–21	Bolton Wanderers	2-0	Manchester United	Wednesday 11 May 1921	Burnden Park (Bolton Wanderers FC)	"record crowd"	Gate receipts £819
1921–22	Bolton Wanderers	3-1	Eccles United	Saturday 20 May 1922	Old Trafford (Manchester United FC)		HT 2-1
1922–23	Stockport County	2–0	Stalybridge Celtic	Monday 7 May 1923	Hyde Road (Manchester City FC)		
1923–24	Manchester United	3-0	Manchester City	Saturday 10 May 1924	Old Trafford (Manchester United FC)	around 16000	Both teams played a weak side, practically reserve XIs
1924–25	Bury	1-0	Manchester City	Saturday 9 May 1925	Old Trafford (Manchester United FC)	around 15000	
1925–26	Manchester United	2-0	Manchester City	Saturday 8 May 1926	Maine Road (Manchester City FC)	around 5000	
1926–27	Crewe Alexandra	2-1	Manchester United	Saturday 14th May 1927	Maine Road (Manchester City FC)	around 6000	
1927–28	Manchester City	4-2	Manchester United	Wednesday 9 May 1928	Maine Road (Manchester City FC)		
1928–29	Manchester City	2-0	Bolton Wanderers	Saturday 11 May 1929	Maine Road (Manchester City FC)		
1929–30	Wigan Borough	3-2; AET	Manchester City	Wednesday 7 May 1930	Maine Road (Manchester City FC)	2600	Score at 90 mins was 2-2. Manchester City were effectively their reserves as they fielded their Central League side
1930–31	Manchester United	5-1	Bury	Saturday 9 May 1931	Maine Road (Manchester City FC)	4948	HT 1-1
1931–32	Manchester City	1-0	Oldham Athletic	Saturday 14 May 1932	Boundary Park (Oldham Athletic AFC)		
1932–33	Manchester City	2-1	Manchester United	Monday 15 May 1933	Hyde Road (Manchester City FC)		
1933–34	Manchester United	1-0	Manchester City	Monday 7 May 1934	Old Trafford (Manchester United FC)		
1934–35	Bury	2-1	Manchester United	Saturday 11 May 1935	Maine Road (Manchester City)		
1935–36	Manchester United	5-1	Oldham Athletic	Saturday 9 May 1936	Old Trafford (Manchester United FC)		
1936–37	Manchester United	1-0; AET	Bury	Saturday 8 May 1937	Old Trafford (Manchester United FC)	"meagre"	Score at 90 mins was 2-2
1937–38	Bolton Wanderers	2-1	Manchester United	Saturday 14 May 1938	Old Trafford (Manchester United FC)		Manchester United also fielded a team in the Lancashire Senior Cup Final on the same day
1938–39	Manchester United	4-1	Oldham Athletic	Saturday 13 May 1939	Old Trafford (Manchester United FC)		

The competition was not held between 1939 and 1946 due to World War II

=== 1946-1958 ===
Season	Winner	Result	Runner-up	Date	Venue	Attendance	Notes
1946–47	Competition abandoned						It was not possible to complete all the rounds within the recognised playing season. Due to bad winter weather, the FA extended the season, but banned any more midweek games. This meant that the Manchester FA decided to cancel the Senior Cup just before the scheduled 1st Round matches in March 1947
1947–48	Manchester United	3-1	Bolton Wanderers	Wednesday 5 May 1948	Burnden Park (Bolton Wanderers FC)		
1948–49	Manchester City	2-1	Bury	Saturday 14 May 1949	Burnden Park (Bolton Wanderers FC)	2919	
1949–50	Oldham Athletic	2-1	Manchester City	Monday 8 May 1950	Boundary Park (Oldham Athletic AFC)		
1950–51	Bury	2-1	Oldham Athletic	Monday 7 May 1951	Boundary Park (Oldham Athletic AFC)	4600	
1951–52	Bury	2-1	Bolton Wanderers	Saturday 10 May 1952	Gigg Lane (Bury FC)	5828	HT 1-0
1952–53	Oldham Athletic	3-1	Bolton Wanderers	Monday 4 May 1953	Boundary Park (Oldham Athletic AFC)		
1953–54	Bolton Wanderers	1-0	Manchester United	Monday 26 April 1954	Old Trafford (Manchester United FC)		
1954–55	Manchester United	5-0	Oldham Athletic	Wednesday 26 October 1955	The Cliff (Manchester United FC training ground)		
1955–56	Competition abandoned						Manchester United and Bolton Wanderers had reached the final, but as the semi-finals were not concluded until 30th April, and both teams were set for tour games in May, there was no time to schedule the Final
1956–57	Manchester United	6-1	Oldham Athletic	Friday 10 May 1957	Boundary Park (Oldham Athletic AFC)		
1957–58	Oldham Athletic	1-0	Manchester City	Monday 5 May 1958	Boundary Park (Oldham Athletic AFC)		

In 1958, the five Senior clubs currently involved met together to put forward a proposal that the format of the Manchester Senior Cup should be changed. The proposal was that two of the five senior clubs involved (Manchester United, Manchester City, Bolton Wanderers, Bury and Oldham Athletic) should, in sequence, play in the competition as a one-off Final. The teams would choose their first teams and charge first team prices. The format was approved by the full (Manchester County FA) Council and the Football Association gave its approval

=== 1958-1964 ===
Season	Winner	Result	Runner-up	Date	Venue	Attendance	Notes
1958–59	Manchester United	4-0	Manchester City	Monday 13 April 1959	Old Trafford (Manchester United FC)	23509	
1959–60	Bury	5-1	Oldham Athletic	Tuesday 15 March 1960	Gigg Lane (Bury FC)	2555	HT 2-0
1960–61	Bolton Wanderers	POSTPONED	Manchester United	Wednesday 26 April 1961	Old Trafford (Manchester United FC)		Postponed due to a waterlogged pitch
	Bolton Wanderers	1-0	Manchester United	Monday 13 November 1961	Old Trafford (Manchester United FC)	5710	HT 0-0
1961–62	Bury	1-0	Manchester City	Tuesday 27 March 1962	Gigg Lane (Bury FC)	5397	HT 0-0
1962–63	Bolton Wanderers	3-1	Oldham Athletic	Monday 20 May 1963	Boundary Park (Oldham Athletic FC)		
1963–64	Manchester United	5-3	Manchester City	Thursday 7 May 1964	Maine Road (Manchester City FC)	36434	It doubled as a Charity match organised by the Variety Club of Great Britain for the Duke of Edinburgh Trophy, raising around £20,000 for underprivileged children's charities. Attendance included the Duke of Edinburgh. Denis Law scored a hat-trick

In 1964, Bolton Wanderers, Manchester City and Manchester United declined to compete in future competitions, instead making a payment in lieu. This means that all finals now were to be between Oldham Athletic and Bury.

=== 1964-1965 ===
Season	Winner	Result	Runner-up	Date	Venue	Attendance	Notes
1964–65	Oldham Athletic	2-0	Bury	Tuesday 6 April 1965	Boundary Park (Oldham Athletic AFC)	1827	HT 2-0

It was decided that for 1965-66 and 1966-67 not to hold the Manchester Senior Cup match, following problems with the staging of the competition. The fixture resumed for 1967-68

=== 1967-1970 ===
Season	Winner	Result	Runner-up	Date	Venue	Attendance	Notes
1967–68	Bury	3-1	Oldham Athletic	Tuesday 3 April 1968	Gigg Lane (Bury FC)	1751	HT 1-1
1968–69	Oldham Athletic	2-0	Bury	Friday 2 May 1969	Boundary Park (Oldham Athletic AFC)	709	HT 0-0
1969–70	Oldham Athletic	4-1	Bury	Tuesday 28 April 1970	Boundary Park (Oldham Athletic AFC)		HT 2-1

The Manchester FA relaunched the competition in 1970 and senior non-league sides then played in it.

=== 1970-1979 ===
Season	Winner	Result	Runner-up	Date	Venue	Attendance	Notes
1970–71	Dukinfield Town	LEG-1; 2-0	Mossley	Monday 24 May 1971	National Park (Dukinfield Town FC)		Dukinfield Town were sharing Curzon Ashton's National Park at the time
	Dukinfield Town	LEG-2; 3-2; AGG 5-2	Mossley	Wednesday 26 May 1971	Seel Park (Mossley AFC)		
1971–72	Mossley	LEG-1; 2-0	Droylsden	Wednesday 10 May 1972	Butcher's Arms (Droylsden FC)		
	Mossley	LEG-2; 0-1; AGG 2-1	Droylsden	Saturday 13 May 1972	Seel Park (Mossley AFC)		
1972–73	Droylsden	p1-1	Radcliffe Borough	Friday 11 May 1973	Butcher's Arms (Droylsden FC)		Droylsden won 5–3 on Penalties - no extra time was played. HT score was 0-1
1973–74	Oldham Athletic reserves	p0-0	Droylsden	Thursday 2 May 1974	Butcher's Arms (Droylsden FC)		KO 7.30pm. Oldham Athletic reserves won 4-2 on Penalties - no extra time was played
1974–75	Hyde United	p0-0 AET	Oldham Athletic reserves	Tuesday 6 May 1975	UNKNOWN		Hyde United won 3–1 on Penalties
1975–76	Droylsden	LEG-1; 4-1	Ashton United	Monday 10 May 1976	Hurst Cross (Ashton United FC)		
	Droylsden	LEG-2; 2-1; AGG 6-2	Ashton United	Friday 14 May 1976	Butcher's Arms (Droylsden FC)		Some sources incorrectly report Ashton United as the winners
1976–77	Mossley	LEG-1; 5-0	Droylsden	Friday 8 April 1977	Butcher's Arms (Droylsden FC)		
	Mossley	LEG-2; 7-3; AGG 12-3	Droylsden	Monday 2 May 1977	Seel Park (Mossley AFC)		
1977–78	Ashton United	LEG-1; 0-1	Hyde United	Monday 10 April 1978	Ewen Fields (Hyde United FC)		
	Ashton United	LEG-2; 2-0; AGG 2-1	Hyde United	Monday 24 April 1978	Hurst Cross (Ashton United FC)		
1978–79	Droylsden	LEG-1; 1-1	Mossley	Thursday 17 May 1979	Butcher's Arms (Droylsden FC)		
	Droylsden	LEG-2; 3-0; AGG 4-1	Mossley	Thursday 24 May 1979	Seel Park (Mossley AFC)		

In 1979 the competition was put on hiatus until it was relaunched in 1998 as a reserve competition for the senior professional sides

=== 1998-2016 ===
Season	Winner	Result	Runner-up	Date	Venue	Attendance	Notes
1998–99	Manchester United reserves	3-0	Oldham Athletic reserves	Thursday 13 May 1999	Boundary Park (Oldham Athletic AFC)	around 1000	HT 0-0. Scorers: David Healy, Luke Chadwick and Mark Wilson
1999–00	Manchester United reserves	2-0	Oldham Athletic reserves	Tuesday 2 May 2000	Boundary Park (Oldham Athletic AFC)		HT 1-0
2000–01	Manchester City reserves	4-1	Manchester United reserves	Friday 11 May 2001	Old Trafford (Manchester United FC)	3132	
2001–02	Oldham Athletic reserves	3-2	Manchester City reserves	Monday 22 April 2002	Boundary Park (Oldham Athletic AFC)	1080	Had originally been planned for Hyde United's Ewen Fields. HT 1-0
2002–03	Oldham Athletic reserves	2-0	Manchester City reserves	Thursday 15 May 2003	Boundary Park (Oldham Athletic AFC)		HT 2-0
2003–04	Manchester United reserves	3-1	Manchester City reserves	Tuesday 11 May 2004	Old Trafford (Manchester United FC)	3484	HT 2-1
2004–05	Manchester City reserves	3-2	Manchester United reserves	Monday 9 May 2005	City of Manchester Stadium (Manchester City FC)	4783	
2005–06	Manchester United reserves	3-2	Oldham Athletic reserves	Tuesday 25 April 2006	Boundary Park (Oldham Athletic AFC)		
2006–07	Manchester City reserves	3-1	Manchester United reserves	Tuesday 8 May 2007	Old Trafford (Manchester United FC)		
2007–08	Manchester United reserves	2-0	Bolton Wanderers reserves	Mon 12 May 2008	Old Trafford (Manchester United FC)		
2008–09	Manchester United reserves	1-0	Bolton Wanderers reserves	Tuesday 12 May 2009	Reebok Stadium (Bolton Wanderers FC)		HT 1-0
2009–10	Manchester City reserves	1-0	Bolton Wanderers reserves	Thursday 6 May 2010	Reebok Stadium (Bolton Wanderers FC)		
2010–11	Manchester United reserves	3-1	Bolton Wanderers reserves	Monday 16 May 2011	Old Trafford (Manchester United FC)	450	
2011–12	Manchester United reserves	2-0	Manchester City reserves	Thursday 17 May 2012	Etihad Stadium (Manchester City FC)	5157	
2012–13	Manchester United reserves	AWARDED	Bolton Wanderers reserves	NOT PLAYED	N/A		The competition was abandoned mid-way through the group stages due to fixture congestion. Manchester United were awarded the title and Bolton Wanderers runners-up due to their record in the group stages at that point
2013–14	Manchester United reserves	4-1	Manchester City reserves	Thursday 7 August 2014	Ewen Fields (Hyde United FC)	3261	James Wilson scored all 4 goals for Manchester United reserves
2014–15	Bolton Wanderers U21	1-0	Manchester City U21	Sunday 30 August 2015	Academy Stadium (Manchester City EDS)	750	HT 1-0
2015–16	Competition abandoned						All fixtures up to and including the Semi-Finals had been played, but the Final between Manchester United U21 and Manchester City U21 was to have been played at the Academy Stadium, Manchester. However, the fixture was not arranged and subsequently the competition was therefore abandoned

No Manchester Senior Cup matches have been played since the 2016 abandoned competition, and therefore as of 2025, is currently on hiatus. As of 2026, the Manchester FA is looking at possibilities for a relaunch of the competition within the next couple of seasons
