= Fleetwood Rangers F.C. =

Football club in Fleetwood, England

Fleetwood Rangers
- Full name: Fleetwood Rangers Football Club
- Nicknames: the Rangers, the Amber & Blacks, the Copseites
- Founded: 1883
- Dissolved: 1899
- Ground: Copse Ground
- Secretary: W. M. Blackhurst
Home colours

Fleetwood Rangers F.C. were an English association football club from Fleetwood on the Fylde Coast of Lancashire.

== History ==
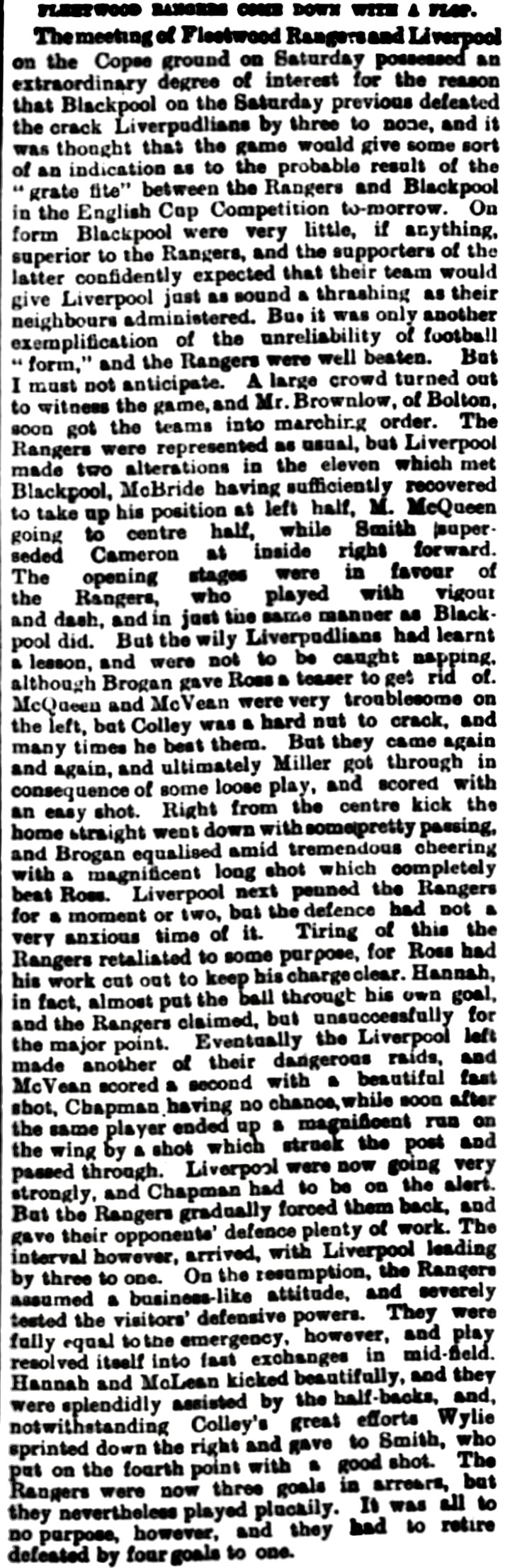
1892–93 Lancashire League, Fleetwood Rangers 1–4 Liverpool, Fleetwood Chronicle, 18 November 1892

The club was founded in 1883 and played at the Copse ground. The club got off to the perfect start, scoring in the first minute of its first match (at Wrea Green F.C.); however the club lost 3–1.

The club entered the Lancashire Senior Cup for the first time in 1884–85, but was "completely overpowed" by Great Harwood in its first tie and lost 8–0. For 1885–86, the club stepped back into the Junior Cup, winning its first round tie against Halliwell Jubilee 3–2, before an encouraging crowd of 1,000. The crowd increased to 1,500 for the second round tie against Read F.C., the Rangers again winning, this time thanks to a winner in a five-minute extra-time period. The club was eliminated by eventual runners-up Darwen Rovers in the quarter-finals, despite a protest; nevertheless the Rangers hosted the final, won by Bell's Temperance of Accrington.

=== FA Cup ===
The club however was obviously improving, to the extent that in 1886–87 it entered the FA Cup, and had a walkover in the first round after opponents Newton Heath turned up with a number of ineligible players, scratched from the competition there and then, but agreed to play a friendly for the spectators and to avoid any claims for expenses. In the second round the Rangers were drawn to play Scottish side Partick Thistle, in a match held at Inchview. 300 supporters turned up to Blackpool station to wish the side well, but they were hammered 7–0.

Nevertheless, the club had obviously made an impression on Partick as the club was one of the stops of Scottish clubs touring northern England; the Rangers beat the Jags 5–2 in a return match, but lost 3–0 to Kilmarnock.

The following season, the club was drawn at home to West Manchester; at 3pm, the time of the scheduled kick-off, the Manchester club had not arrived, so Fleetwood kicked off, scored, and claimed the tie. West Manchester arrived at 4pm and the Rangers agreed to play, but only under protest as they had already claimed the tie. The point was moot as Rangers came from behind to win 4–1. The club however lacked its injured captain Butcher for the second round tie with Higher Walton and went out 3–1.

The following season the Football Association introduced qualifying rounds and the Rangers never made the first round proper again. Indeed, drawn at home to Blackburn Olympic in the 1888–99 qualifiers, the club scratched.

=== Lancashire League and Combination ===
In 1889, the club joined the Lancashire League, and although it struggled at first, by 1891–92 it was regularly near the top. In 1892–93 its first match was at home to the new club of Liverpool, losing 4–1, the referee not allowing a Rangers claim for a goal after the ball was cleared from behind the goal-line. However, after a disastrous 1896–97 season, it failed to be re-elected to the League, and instead joined the Lancashire Combination, but it found the going no easier; after the 1898–99 season, which saw the club finish bottom of the league, it did not seek re-election, and disbanded; the final recorded match was a 5–1 defeat to Leyland. The old players got together for one final match at the Copse - a charity affair against a Volunteer eleven, which the Rangers won 7–0.

== Colours ==
The club's colours are listed as amber, black, and white, which refers to amber and black striped shirts and white shorts.

== Ground ==
The club played at the Copse Ground.

== Notable players ==
- Tom Pratt, forward, who later played for Preston North End and Tottenham Hotspur
