= North Road, Manchester =

Football stadium and cricket field in Newton Heath, Manchester, England

North Road
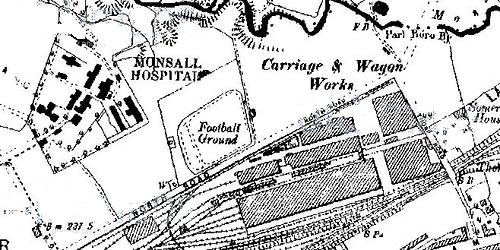
- Interactive map of North Road
- Location: Newton Heath, Manchester, England
- Coordinates: 53°30′13″N 2°11′56″W
- Owner: Manchester Cathedral
- Capacity: ~15,000
- Surface: Grass

Tenant
- Newton Heath (1878–1893)

North Road was a football and cricket ground in Newton Heath, Manchester, England. It was the first home of Manchester United Football Club – then known as Newton Heath Lancashire & Yorkshire Railway Football Club – from its foundation in 1878 until 1893, when the club moved to a new ground at Bank Street, Clayton.

Initially the ground consisted only of the pitch, around which an estimated 12,000 spectators could congregate. The addition of stands in 1891 increased the capacity to about 15,000. The football club signed its first professional players in 1886 and began to break from its sponsoring railway company, but without the company's financial support it was unable to afford the rent on the ground and was evicted.

== History ==
=== Early years ===
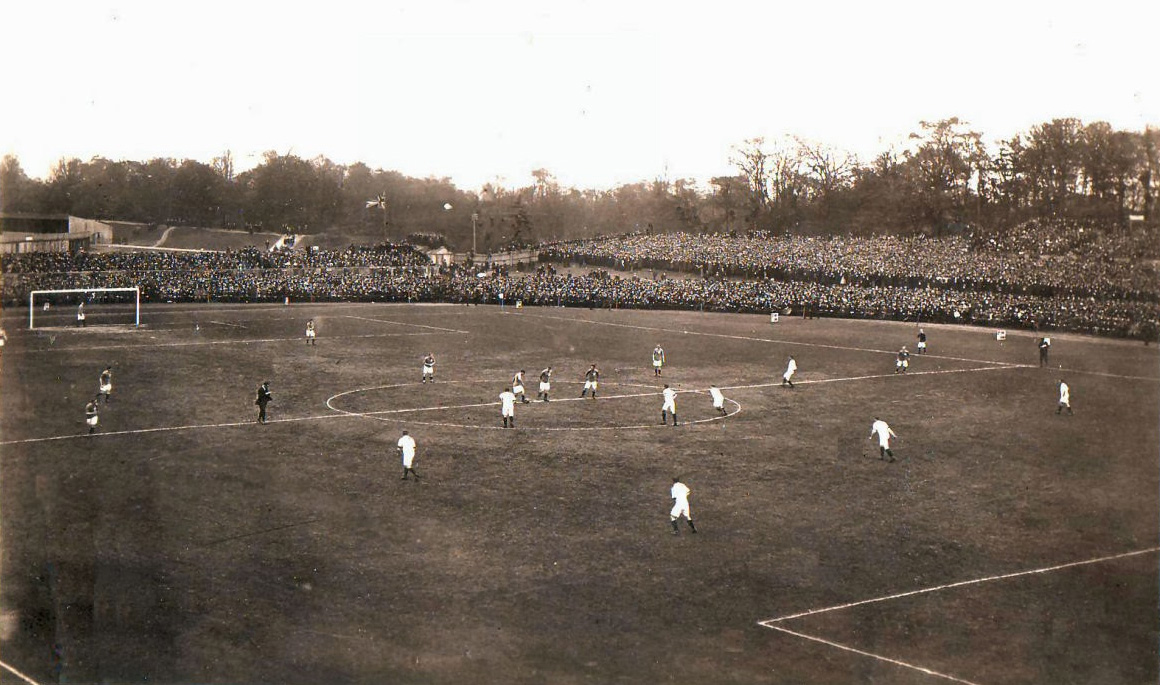
North Road was the home of Newton Heath LYR FC (later named Manchester United) from their founding in 1878 to 1893.

Following the foundation of Newton Heath LYR F.C., at the request of the employees of the Lancashire and Yorkshire Railway (LYR) company's Carriage and Wagon Works, the club needed a pitch to play on. The chosen site was owned by the Manchester Cathedral authorities, but although conveniently sited next to the wagon works it was a "bumpy, stony patch in summer, [and] a muddy, heavy swamp in the rainy months". The railway company agreed to pay a nominal rent to the authorities and to lease the ground to the football club. As it was next to the railway line operated by the LYR, the ground was often clouded in a thick mist of steam from passing trains. Players had to get changed in The Three Crowns public house, a few hundred yards away on Oldham Road, as there were no facilities nearby. There may have been some kind of refreshment offered to supporters at the eastern end of the site.

The first recorded matches at the ground took place in 1880, two years after the club's formation, most of them friendlies. The first competitive match held at North Road was a Lancashire Cup first round match against Blackburn Olympic's reserve team, played on 27 October 1883, which Newton Heath lost 7–2. Details of the attendance have been lost, but it is assumed that the ground must have been enclosed by then, as an entry fee of 3d (about £1 as of 2025) was charged for the match. Football became a professional sport in England in 1885, and Newton Heath signed their first professional players in the summer of 1886. The club's income was insufficient to cover its wage bill, and so the 3d admission charge was extended to all matches played at North Road, later rising to 6d.

=== Expansion and eviction ===
The ground originally had a capacity of about 12,000, but club officials decided that was not enough to give them any hope of joining the Football League. Some expansion took place in 1887, but in 1891 Newton Heath used what little financial reserves they had to purchase two grandstands, each able to hold 1,000 spectators. However, this transaction put the club at odds with the railway company, who refused to contribute any finance to the deal. The two organisations began to drift apart from then onwards, and in 1892 the club attempted to raise £2,000 in share capital to pay off the debts incurred by the expansion of the ground.

The split also led the railway company to stop paying the rent due on the ground to the cathedral, who at about the same time decided to increase the rent. Under increasing financial pressure, especially as the cathedral authorities felt it inappropriate for the club to charge admission to the ground, an eviction notice was served on the club in June 1893. The club's management had been searching for a new stadium since the first eviction attempt in May the previous year, and they were able to move to a new ground on Bank Street, three miles away in Clayton. It proved impossible though to take the two grandstands to the new ground, and they were sold for £100.

=== Present ===
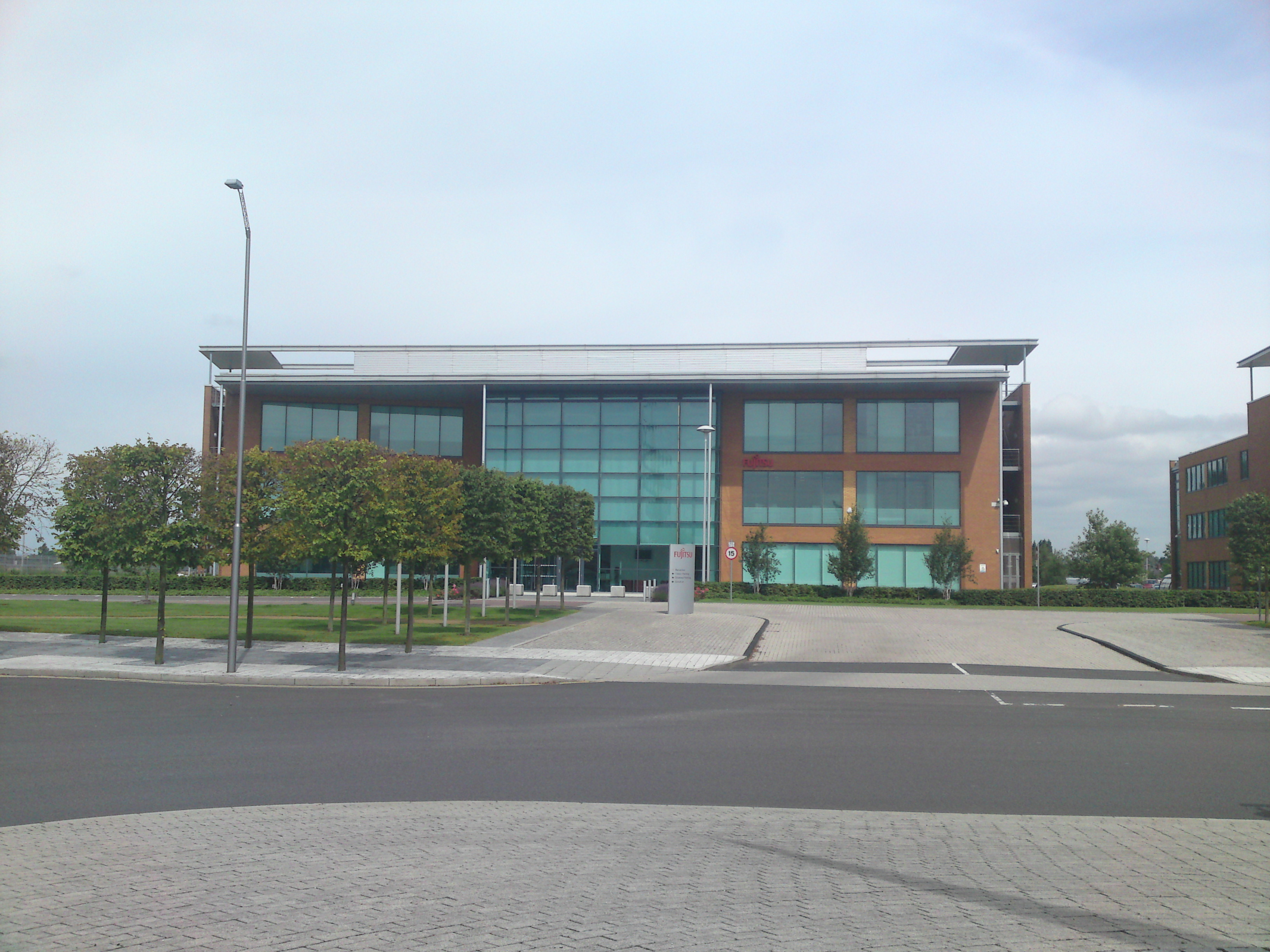
The Fujitsu offices occupying the North Road site as of 2009

The stadium no longer exists, and North Road has been renamed Northampton Road. After a spell serving as playing fields for locals, Moston Brook High School was opened on the site. A red plaque was attached to one of the school's walls, marking the location of the old stadium, The original circular plaque was saved from the rubble and subsequent fire and now resides in nearby Moston. Following the school's closure in August 2000, the site was chosen by the Northwest Regional Development Agency (NWDA) as the location of the North Manchester Business Park in 2002.

== Other uses ==
Newton Heath LYR Football Club was also founded as a cricket club, and the North Road ground was used by both branches of the club. However, the cricket and football seasons often overlapped, causing conflicts between the two sports. The ground was barely adequate for football, despite the best efforts of groundsmen Charlie and Ned Massey, but its use in the winter made it even less suitable for cricket in the summer.

== Records ==
Although attendance figures were not recorded for many of the earliest matches at North Road, the highest recorded attendance at the ground was approximately 15,000 for a First Division match against Sunderland on 4 March 1893. A similar attendance was also recorded for a friendly match against Gorton Villa on 5 September 1889. A record-low league attendance of approximately 1,000 was recorded for Football Alliance matches against Walsall Town Swifts and Birmingham City on 21 April 1890 and 13 December 1890 respectively. However, an attendance of 400 was recorded for a Manchester Cup match against Eccles on 31 January 1885.

The earliest recorded four-figure attendance at the ground was 3,000 for a friendly with West Gorton (St. Mark's) on 12 November 1881. This was the first recorded meeting of the two rivals that eventually became Manchester United and Manchester City.
