= Frederick Attock =

British railway engineer with historic football links

- Born: 10 February 1846; Liverpool, England
- Died: 21 May 1902 (aged 56); Windermere
- Engineering career
- Discipline: Railway engineering
- Projects: L&YR Carriages
- Significant design: Axleboxes

Frederick Attock (10 February 1846 – 21 May 1902) was Carriage Superintendent of the Lancashire and Yorkshire Railway (L&YR) and the first president of Newton Heath L&YR F.C., the club that later became Manchester United F.C.

== Biography ==
Attock was born in Liverpool in 1846. His father George moved to take up a new post in the Carriage and Wagon works of the Eastern Counties Railway (ECR) at Stratford, Essex seemingly at some point in or before 1846. George, his wife Hephzibah and surviving children Martin, Mary Curtis, George and Frederick moved to 1 Angel Place, Leyton Road, near the Works. Elizabeth, Phoebe Ann and Caroline were born between 1847 and 1851 though Caroline died about aged two. (Note: Martin, Mary Curtis and George (junior) were baptised in Preston and their surname recorded as "Atock", others took the surname "Attock". George had actually been born "Atock" but was recorded as "Attock" on his marriage to Hephzibah.) Martin Atock, some 10 years older than Frederick, entered the employ of the ECR about 1848 and left to Ireland in 1861 in to take up positions of locomotive superintendent firstly at the Waterford and Limerick Railway and subsequently at the Midland Great Western Railway.

=== Eastern Counties Railway ===
George (junior) joined the ECR aged 14 in 1850. Frederick was apprenticed to his father in 1860, just before the ECR merged with smaller companies to become the Great Eastern Railway (GER) in 1862. George retired from ill-health as Carriage and Wagon Superintendent of the GER in 1874 after 29 years of service, with Frederick taking his role and being responsible for about 2,000 carriages, 11,000 wagons, 600 road vans and 1,150 men.

=== Lancashire and Yorkshire Railway ===
during your Superintendency they have always received your most hearty support in all matters in which their interests were involved & they most sincerely place on record their high appreciation of your urbanity and kindness in all matters affecting their welfare; while at the same time your obligations to the Company".

— Staff of the Carriage and Wagon Department on Attock's resignation through ill–health

In February 1877 Frederick was appointed as Carriage and Wagon Superintendent of the L&YR in February 1877 located at the new Newton Heath site. Attock seen the new works produce its first carriages in the summer of 1877.

The bogie coach shown at the 1866 Liverpool exhibition won Attock much acclaim. Attock next presented a 6-wheeled invalid coach with an open interior for wheelchairs and bed at the Royal Jubilee Exhibition in Manchester the following year.

Attock apparently been on the opposite side of a family rift with Martin, but with the help of Hephzibah there was a reconciliation in 1891.

Attock became ill in the 1895 and resigned in October. He was given awarded a gratuity of £500 in recognition of the L&YR's use of his many patents over the years. The staff of the Wagon and carriage department also raised a collection of £400.00.

==== Newton Heath FC ====
Attock is also noted, perhaps more widely, for his association with Manchester United F.C. via its origins in Newton Heath FC. Newton Heath L&YR Football Club was established in 1878 by members of the dining room committee at the carriage and wagon works, and Attock was appointed as the club's president soon after. It is understood Attock used his connections to enable the club to appoint some notable vice-presidents: Arthur Balfour MP (who later became Prime Minister of the United Kingdom from 1902 to 1905); Charles Ernest Schwann MP; James Majoron MP; and the editor of the Manchester Guardian, Charles Prestwich Scott. The patronage of the LYR at Newton Heath which was within the wherewithall of Attock to bestow (Note: The note from the staff of the Carriage and Wagon Department seem to indicate he was prepared to be generally helpful to the staff in various matters provided it was possibly to justify within the context of his responsibilities to the LYR.) was of some advantage to the club as it grew in the 1880s: players other clubs from outside the local area, notably Wales, seem to be attracted by the fact the club its own ground and prospects of job LYR; both provision via the LYR. While the patronage of the LYR was beneficial there were other clubs that better funded by wealthier patrons and the increasing professionalisation and organisation in the 1880s placed demands on the club. Tensions seem to have arisen to a head approaching 1892 with the club severing all connections with the LYR and becoming a limited company. The club set up its offices at the Shears Hotel on Oldham Road, before moving to new premises at 33 Oldham Road in 1892. Attock was replaced as club president by T. Connolly in 1891.

=== Family ===
Attock's son, Frederick William Attock, also worked at the Lancashire & Yorkshire Railway and rose to become Outside Locomotive Superintendent in 1912. Grandson Martin Oldacres Attock was born in 1909 to George Henry and went on to have a career with English Electric including commissioning British Rail Class D3/6, Ceylon Government Railway Class S1 and British Rail Class D16/1 amongst many other projects.
