= 1891–92 FA Cup qualifying rounds =

Tournament details
- Country: England; Wales

This was the fourth season where the FA Cup, or the Football Association Challenge Cup, used a series of qualifying rounds in order to determine qualifiers for the actual Cup competition itself.

See 1891–92 FA Cup for details of the rounds from the first round onwards.

== First qualifying round ==
Home team (tier)	Score	Away team (tier)
Saturday 3 October 1891
Fairfield	3–1	South Shore
Darlington	3–0	Port Clarence
Bury	3–1	Witton
Matlock	4–2	Beeston
Reading	2–1	Newbury
Shankhouse	w–w	Birtley
Folkestone	3–3	Old St Mark's
Maidenhead	0–5	Watford Rovers
Old Etonians	6–1	Hunts County
Rochester	1–2	Millwall Athletic
Staveley	3–0	Notts Olympic
Grimsby Town	3–0	Long Eaton Rangers
Macclesfield Town	4–2	Newtown
Old Westminsters	5–1	Ipswich Town
Newark	3–1	Eckington Works
Casuals	3–2	Clapton
Lincoln City	3–2	Doncaster Rovers
Higher Walton	4–5	Blackpool
Burslem Port Vale	2–4	Burton Wanderers
Luton Town	4–3	Swindon Town
Gainsborough Trinity	3–0	Grantham
Attercliffe	1–2	Rotherham Town
London Caledonians	4–2	Chesham
Newton Heath	5–1	Ardwick
Scarborough	4–1	West Hartlepool N.E.R.
Boston	5–3	Sheffield
Whitburn	3–2	Sunderland Olympic
Heywood Central	w–w	Mossbay Exchange
Nantwich	3–0	Chester St Oswalds
Gorton Villa	6–1	Leek
Walsall Town Swifts	7–2	Wednesbury Old Athletic

Home team (tier)	Score	Away team (tier)
Thorpe	1–3	Old Wykehamists
Norwich CEYMS	1–9	Marlow
Gateshead NER	7–2	Ashington
Bishop Auckland	4–3	Southwick
Darlington St Augustines	3–4	South Bank
Clifton Association	5–0	Poole
Leicester Fosse	2–6	Small Heath
Hednesford Town	1–2	Brierley Hill Alliance
Middlesbrough Ironopolis	w–w	Hurworth
Rhosllanerchrugog	0–1	Chester
Ilford	0–1	Chatham
Mansfield Town	3–0	Riddings
Grantham Rovers	w–w	Sheffield Heeley
Warmley	1–4	Southampton St Mary's
Wolverton	w–w	Swifts
Hereford	w–w	Kettering
Spennymoor	4–3	Whitby
Tow Law	1–5	Newcastle East End
Prescot	1–7	Crewe Alexandra
1st Highland Light Infantry	7–0	Maidstone
Old Cranleighans	2–3	Gravesend
Crouch End	6–2	Ashford United
Royton	6–3	Halliwell
Somerset Rovers	6–3	Bristol St George
Barrow	1–3	Fleetwood Rangers
Tranmere Rovers	1–5	Northwich Victoria
Greenhalgh's	1–5	Heanor Town
Heywood	6–0	North Meols
Replays
Saturday 10 October 1891
Old St Mark's	4–2	Folkestone

== Second qualifying round ==
Home team (tier)	Score	Away team (tier)
Saturday 24 October 1891
Blackpool	4–2	Fleetwood Rangers
Chester	2–4	Wrexham
Darlington	13–1	Scarborough
South Bank	2–4	Stockton
Old Wykehamists	0–5	Marlow
Old Carthusians	4–6	Old Etonians
Grimsby Town	10–0	Boston
Northwich Victoria	9–0	Liverpool Stanley
South Shore	8–1	Halliwell
Rotherham Town	5–1	Kilnhurst
Derby Junction	1–2	Newark
Luton Town	3–0	Windsor Phoenix
Burton Wanderers	1–1	Small Heath
Gainsborough Trinity	4–0	Grantham Rovers
Newcastle West End	1–3	Newcastle East End
London Caledonians	2–1	Watford Rovers
Newton Heath	w–w	Heywood
Old St Mark's	1–5	Casuals
Whitburn	4–10	Gateshead NER
Heywood Central	1–2	Bury
Nantwich	3–4	Macclesfield Town
Gorton Villa	2–3	Crewe Alexandra

Home team (tier)	Score	Away team (tier)
Walsall Town Swifts	2–4	Burton Swifts
Loughborough	7–0	Hereford
Sheffield United	4–1	Lincoln City
Heanor Town	2–1	Staveley
Bishop Auckland	4–2	Rendel
Millwall Athletic	3–4	1st Highland Light Infantry
Clifton	8–5	Somerset Rovers
Middlesbrough Ironopolis	7–0	Whitby
Gravesend	0–8	Old Brightonians
Mansfield Town	4–0	Matlock
Wolverton	0–4	Old Westminsters
Rothwell	1–1	Leeds Albion
Buxton	6–0	Gedling Grove
Crouch End	0–4	Chatham
Willington Athletic	2–2	Shankhouse
Stourbridge	0–2	Brierley Hill Alliance
Southampton St Mary's	7–0	Reading
Bedminster	w–w	93rd Highland Regiment
Replays
Saturday 31 October 1891
Small Heath	2–1	Burton Wanderers
Leeds Albion	2–0	Rothwell
Shankhouse	4–1	Willington Athletic

== Third qualifying round ==
Home team (tier)	Score	Away team (tier)
Saturday 14 November 1891
Darlington	w–w	Leeds Albion
Bury	5–5	Blackpool
Old Etonians	2–3	London Caledonians
Chatham	3–2	Old Brightonians
Grimsby Town	1–2	Sheffield United
Northwich Victoria	5–0	Macclesfield Town
South Shore	0–2	Newton Heath
Old Westminsters	6–1	Marlow
Crewe Alexandra	3–1	Wrexham
Newark	0–0	Heanor Town
Gainsborough Trinity	4–1	Rotherham Town
Newcastle East End	3–2	Shankhouse
Small Heath	4–2	Burton Swifts
Bishop Auckland	3–1	Gateshead NER
Clifton	8–2	Reading

Home team (tier)	Score	Away team (tier)
Middlesbrough Ironopolis	1–1	Stockton
Mansfield Town	0–0	Buxton
Brierley Hill Alliance	7–0	Loughborough
1st Highland Light Infantry	1–4	Casuals
Bedminster	1-4	Luton Town
Replays
Saturday 21 November 1891
Stockton	1–1	Middlesbrough Ironopolis
Heanor Town	6–1	Newark
Mansfield Town	2–2	Buxton
Wednesday 25 November 1891
Blackpool	4–3	Bury
2nd replays
Saturday 28 November 1891
Stockton	2–5	Middlesbrough Ironopolis

== Fourth qualifying round ==
Home team (tier)	Score	Away team (tier)
Saturday 5 December 1891
Darlington	0–3	Middlesbrough Ironopolis
Casuals	1–2	Chatham
Newton Heath	3–4	Blackpool
Newcastle East End	7–0	Bishop Auckland
Small Heath	6–2	Brierley Hill Alliance
Sheffield United	1–0	Gainsborough Trinity
Clifton	0–3	Luton Town
Mansfield Town	2–4	Heanor Town

Home team (tier)	Score	Away team (tier)
Saturday 12 December 1891
London Caledonians	2–2	Old Westminsters
Saturday 19 December 1891
Crewe Alexandra	1–2	Northwich Victoria
Replays
Saturday 19 December 1891
London Caledonians	0–2	Old Westminsters
Saturday 29 December 1891
Crewe Alexandra	6–2	Northwich Victoria
