= 2nd Scots Guards F.C. =

Military association football club in England

- Full name: 2nd Scots Guards Football Club
- Nickname: The Scots
- Founded: 1888
- Ground: Varies per stationing
Home colours

The 2nd Scots Guards Football Club, also known as the 2nd Battalion Scots Guards, was an association football club formed out of soldiers belonging to the Scots Guards.

== History ==
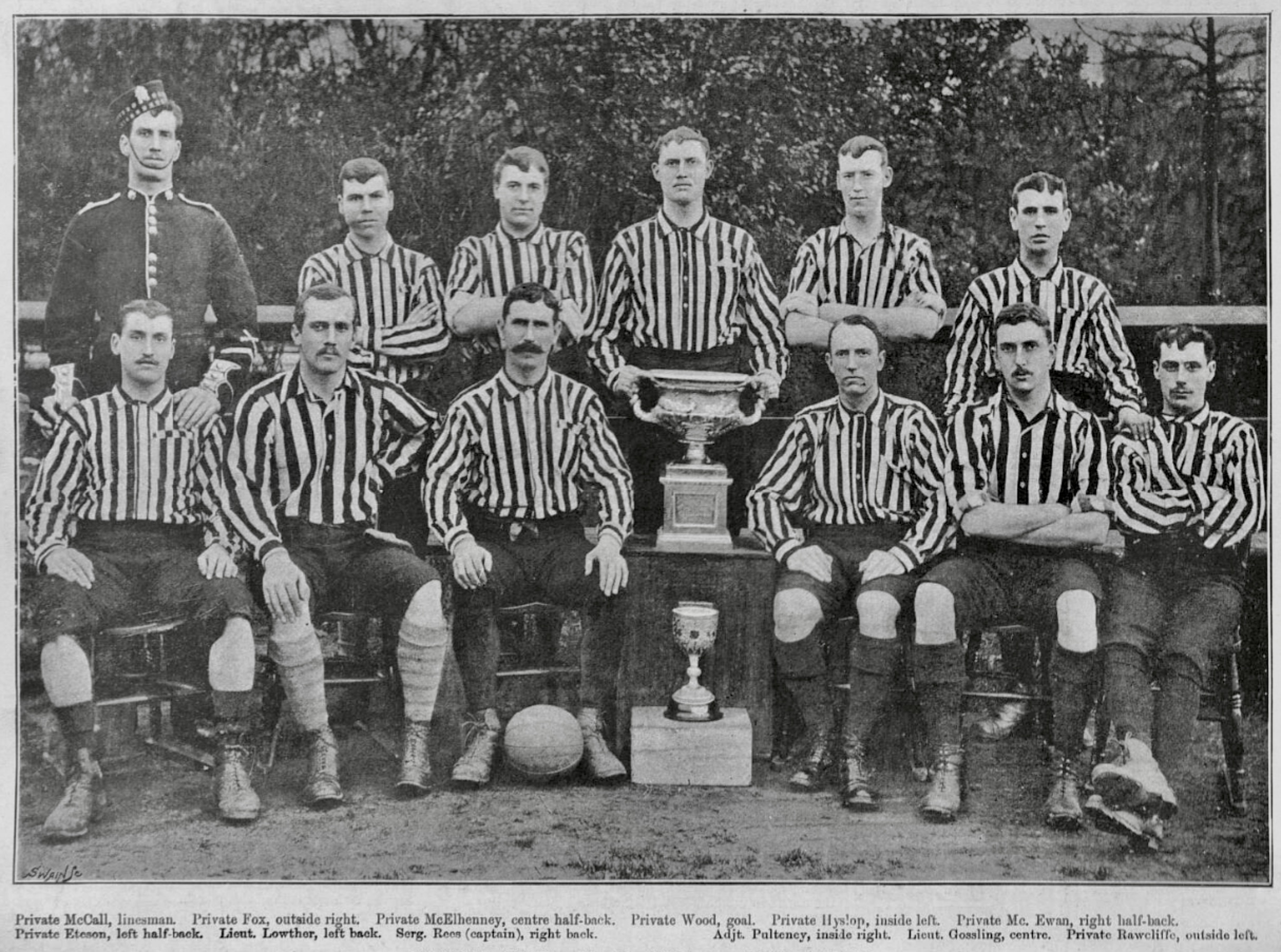
2nd Scots Guards F.C. with the Army Association and Henesey Cups, Illustrated Sporting and Dramatic News, 26 December 1891

The club was formed in 1888, when stationed at Pirbright; its first attempt at the Army Cup, in 1889–90, saw the club reach the final at the Kennington Oval, but the Battalion went down 3–1 to the Black Watch in extra-time, the "superb" goal-keeping of the Guards' Wood "robbing [the Black Watch] of a more substantial verdict".

A draw at the start of the 1890–91 season against the 93rd Highland Regiment, which would later win through the qualifying rounds of the FA Cup, suggested that the Battalion could be successful outside the Army game, and, after moving to Windsor, Berkshire late in 1890, it finished the season by reaching the final of the Berks & Bucks Senior Cup and the Berkshire Charity Cup, only to lose heavily in both finals - 5–1 to Windsor Phoenix in the former, 4–1 to Reading in the latter. It however won the Henesey Cup (arranged by Uxbridge F.C. for clubs in the area) with a 3–0 win over Southall in the final, Even more importantly, it won the Army Cup for the first time, beating the 93rd Highlanders 2–0 before a crowd of 6,000 at the Kennington Oval. Much of the credit again was given to the "almost miraculous goal keeping of Wood", who kept out "shot after shot".

In 1891–92, the club retained both the Henesey Trophy and the Army Cup. The Army final was played at the Lyric Club ground in Barnes, after the Boat Race, and the 2nd Scots Guards beat the 1st Scots Guards 2–1, with a Hyslop goal at the end of extra time. The two sides met again in the Middlesex Senior Cup final at Millwall the same season, and the 2nd won again, coming from 1–0 down to win 4–2, M'Elhenney scoring a hat-trick.

The Battalion won the Middlesex Cup again in 1892–93 and 1894–95. It also seemed to have won the competition in 1897–98 after beating Brentford 3–2 in the final, but the match was re-played at Kensal Rise after a protest about player eligibility, and this time Brentford reversed the score, winning in extra-time after the 90 minutes ended 2–2.

Its best run in the FA Cup came in 1893–94, when it reached the fourth qualifying round; en route it recorded a 10–0 win over Croydon Park and edged its army rivals of the 1st Highland Light Infantry. At that stage it lost to Royal Arsenal, at home, after extra time; the Scots were unlucky as they had to play most of the second half, and all of extra-time, one man short, as Gosling went off injured just after scoring an equalizer. During the season, the club was one of those involved in setting up a second division to the Southern Football League, but withdrew from consideration in April, being replaced by Southampton St Mary's.

The following season it entered the FA Amateur Cup for the first time, and, having made it through qualifying, lost 2–1 at Ipswich Town in a first round replay, the winning goal being a freak deflection in extra-time. The club did not enter the competition again until 1913–14, when it reached the third qualifying round stage, and it never returned to the competition.

As the game became more professional, the club retreated from the front rank of matches. It took part in the 1904–05 Hampshire Senior Cup, losing in the second round to the Army Service Corps, and participated in the Middlesex Football League until the First World War, but afterwards mostly played within a military environment. By that time it had won the Household Brigade Cup twice and Metropolitan Thursday Shield once, and been runner-up in the Middlesex League and Middlesex Mid-week Cup. After the war the side briefly played in a low-key amateur league in south London, but otherwise was confined to military football.

== Colours ==
The club wore black and white striped shirts, black shorts, and black socks.

== Ground ==
The club's home ground depended on where it was stationed. It is known to have hosted matches at the following:

- 1890–92: Windsor Great Park
- 1892–93: Wimbledon
- 1893–95: Tufnell Park
- (1895–97: deployed to Dublin, did not take part in English football)
- 1898–99: Balloon Meadow, Windsor
- (1899–1902: deployed in the Boer War)
- 1904–05: Aldershot
- 1909–10: Windsor
- 1913–14: Heathfield Meadow, Gunnersbury Lane, Acton
- 1919–21: Wimbledon

== Notable players ==
- Tommy Hyslop, who played for the Battalion from 1890 to 1892, and scored in both of the Army Cup wins.
- W. S. Gosling, who also scored in both of the Army Cup triumphs.
