= Loftus F.C. =

Association football club from Northumberland, England (1877–1905)

Loftus
- Full name: Loftus Football Club
- Founded: 1877
- Dissolved: 1905
- Ground: West Loftus
Home colours

Loftus Football Club was an association football club from Loftus, North Yorkshire, England, active in the 19th century.

== History ==
The club was founded in 1877, its first activity being a match between club members. The club joined the Cleveland Football Association in 1881 and recorded a notable scalp in 1885 by beating Middlesbrough 2–0 in a friendly before 400 spectators.

Loftus was a founder of the Cleveland Amateur League in 1891, and finished 4th out of the 8 clubs in its first season. In 1892–93 the club entered the FA Cup for the only time, reaching the third qualifying round, the equivalent of the first round today, albeit after only playing one match - a 3–2 win at Port Clarence. The match had an unfortunate incident when Loftus' A. Russell was injured off the pitch, allegedly by Port's Brown in retaliation for bad language; Russell had to be taken to hospital semi-comatose, but on enquiry the incident was put down to Russell having eaten before the match. In the third round, Loftus was drawn to visit Stockton, which was almost certainly going to result in a heavy defeat. Loftus instead accepted a consideration to scratch, which allowed Stockton to play a more lucrative friendly against Darlington - who had similarly persuaded Hurworth to cede.

From the 1893–94 season the club concentrated its national efforts on the new FA Amateur Cup, which it entered until 1898–99. The only time it won more than one tie in the competition came in 1895–96, when wins over Darlington St Augustine's and Hull Albany put the club in the final qualifying round, but it went down 5–4 at Hunslet, Loftus coming from 4–1 down to bring the scores level, only to concede an 88th-minute penalty for a disputed handball.

Loftus won the Cleveland Amateur League once, in 1894–95, and in 1897 was a founder member of the Northern League's second division, but left in 1900 after three inconsequential seasons. It joined the more local and lower cost Cleveland Alliance from the 1900–01 season, which steadied the financial ship and reduced the club's seasonal losses to a manageable £3.

However the club suffered two devastating blows in short order. On 15 February 1901, the club secretary, William L. Brown, was killed when trying to prop up a loose roof in a Skinningrove mine, and the roof collapsed on him. On 2 March 1903, his replacement as secretary, Thomas Parkin, was also killed in an almost identical accident. these two tragedies removed the motive force from the club, and, willing to step up to the secretary role full time, players drifted away from the club. By the start of the 1905–06 season the club simply had no players remaining, and ceased to exist.

== Colours ==
The club wore black and white jerseys with white knickerbockers. Its change shirt was white.

== Ground ==
The club's first ground was the Liverton Mines Recreation Ground. In 1883 the club moved near to brickyard in West Loftus, on a field owned by Thomas Eaton. It was simply known as the Football Field or Mr Eaton's Field, and remained the club's ground for the rest of its existence, other than a brief period in the mid-1880s when it played on a pitch on Lord Zetland's estate.
