= City Ramblers F.C. =

Football club from London, England

City Ramblers
- Full name: City Ramblers Football Club
- Founded: 1881
- Dissolved: 1896
- Ground: Silver Street, Edmonton, London
- President: Sam Larkin
to 1890 colours	from 1890 colours

City Ramblers F.C. was an amateur association football club, notionally based in the City of London, but which played at a number of grounds around Greater London.

== History ==
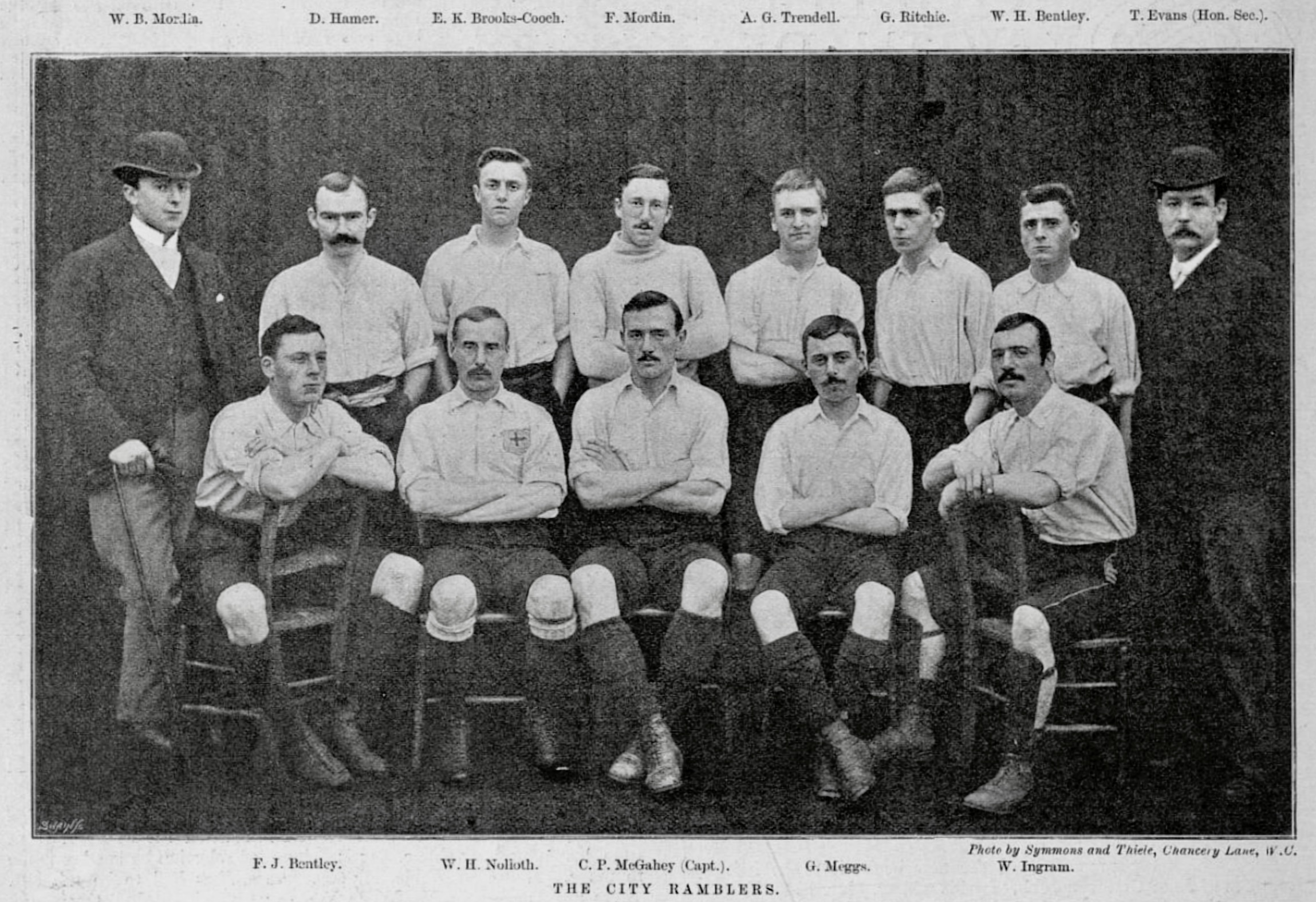
City Ramblers F.C., The Sketch, 3 October 1894

The club was formed in 1881, out of a cricket club which had existed the previous decade, originally under the name of The City Cricket Club.

Through the 1880s, the club played at a low-key level, as the game outside London turned more professional; the club's most senior appearances were in the London Senior Cup but it did not get past the second round.

At the start of the 1890–91 season, the club amalgamated with the Old St Paul's club, taking the Ramblers' name but the St Paul's colours. The club effectively inherited the Old St Paul's place in the FA Cup so entered the qualifying rounds for the first time, and, after its scheduled opponents from the Crystal Palace School of Engineers admitted it had entered by accident and scratched, was humbled 8–0 by the Old Carthusians in the second.

One of the earliest matches for the new merged club, at Marlow in September, was acrimonious, the Marlow board resolving never to play the Ramblers again, "in consequence of the disgraceful behaviour of J. W. Meggs", who was the brother of the Ramblers' new club secretary Charles. Meggs was suspended for 3 months for using "filthy and disgusting language".

From 1891, London clubs such as Woolwich Arsenal and Millwall Rovers started to turn professional, and the Ramblers were left behind. The club did not enter the Cup in 1891–92, but in 1892–93 gained its first win in the competition, beating Old Cranleighans 5–1 in the first round; the professionals of Woolwich Arsenal scored double figures against the Ramblers in the second. Even at the FA Amateur Cup level the club struggled - it lost 6–1 at Tottenham Hotspur in the second round in 1894–95.

The players did however finish the 1893–94 season with an unexpected set of medals; as Smethwick Carriage Works scratched from the final of the Wolverton Charity Cup, the Ramblers stepped up to play a friendly for the benefit of the local charity, and, in gratitude, the charity voted to award the runner-up medals to the Ramblers players. It was a consolation after the death of Sam Larkin, the club's long-running President, the previous month; Larkin had been one of the leading tenants of the Billingsgate Fish Market.

The last season for the club was 1895–96, in which it lost 1–0 to Maidenhead in the first qualifying round of the FA Cup (despite Maidenhead starting with 9 men because of a train problem), and finished the season losing to Wolverton in the semi-final of the Wolverton Charity Cup - both sides were reduced to 10 men due to sendings-off for foul play. It had had its best run in the London Senior Cup, reaching the last 16, and losing 4–2 at Ealing Association.

There was a curious aftermath for the club, as in 1906 a fraudster, purporting to represent the City Ramblers Football Club, sent letters requesting charity for a widow of a deceased player; one of the contributors was Arthur Balfour. The fraudster - one Alfred Whale of Harringay - was sentenced to 3 months' hard labour.

== Colours ==
The club originally played in chocolate and white before adopting the St Paul's school colours of white shirts.

== Ground ==
The club had something of a nomadic existence, playing at the following:

- 1881–84: Victoria Park, Dulwich
- 1884–90: Spotted Dog, Upton Park
- 1890–94: Silver Street, Edmonton
- 1894–95: Hermit Road, Canning Town
- 1895–96: Ponders End Athletic Ground, adjoining Ponders End railway station.

== Notable players ==
- Charlie McGahey, more famous as a cricketer, but who played for the Ramblers from 1891 to 1896.
