= 1890–91 FA Cup qualifying rounds =

Tournament details
- Country: England; Ireland; Wales

This was the third season where the FA Cup, or the Football Association Challenge Cup, used a series of qualifying rounds in order to determine qualifiers for the actual Cup competition itself and the first season that a preliminary round was used.

See 1890–91 FA Cup for details of the rounds from the first round onwards.

== Preliminary round ==
Home team (tier)	Score	Away team (tier)
Saturday 27 September 1890
Crusaders	5–0	Rochester

== First qualifying round ==
Home team (tier)	Score	Away team (tier)
Saturday 4 October 1890
93rd Highland Regiment	7–0	Luton Town
Ardwick	12–0	Liverpool Stanley
Bishop Auckland	3–0	Rendel
Boston	2–2	Eckington Works
Carlisle	1–6	Bootle
Chatham	1–2	Crusaders
Chesham	1–2	Watford Rovers
Chester St Oswalds	0–6	Chester
City Ramblers	W–W	Crystal Palace School of Engineering
Clifton	1–7	Wednesbury Old Athletic
Cliftonville	4–3	Macclesfield Town
Clinton	3–7	Jardines
Darlington St Augustine's	3–2	Barnard Castle Athletic
Darlington West End	3–2	Darlington St Hilda's
Derby Junction	0–1	Sheffield United
Derby Midland	2–3	Loughborough
Ecclesfield	8–2	Grimsby Town
Elswick Rangers	2–5	Newcastle West End
Folkestone	2–1	Old Wykehamists
Gainsborough Trinity	1–3	Lincoln City
Gateshead N.E.R.	2–8	Sunderland Albion
Gorton Villa	4–1	Denton
Gravesend	4–1	Old Harrovians
Hunts County	3–1	Norwich CEYMS
Stockton	14–0	Hurworth
Ipswich Town	2–0	Reading
Kidderminster	4–1	Bath City
Langley Green Victoria	5–0	Kettering Town
Leicester Fosse	0–4	Burton Wanderers
Long Eaton Rangers	W–W	Heeley
Matlock Town	W–W	Leys Recreation

Home team (tier)	Score	Away team (tier)
Middlesbrough	11–0	Scarborough
Millwall Athletic	2–3	Ilford
Morpeth Harriers	0–2	Whitburn
Nantwich	5–4	Linfield Athletic
Newark	4–0	Notts Olympic
Newton Heath	2–0	Higher Walton
Northwich Victoria	3–2	Chirk
Old Brightonians	3–4	Old Carthusians
Old Etonians	4–1	Swifts
Old St Mark's	2–3	London Caledonians
Oldbury Town	3–1	Wellington St George's
Over Wanderers	2–3	Druids
Port Clarence	4–1	Whitby
Rhosllanerchrugog	W–W	Shrewsbury Town
Rotherham Swifts	5–2	Attercliffe
Rotherham Town	13–0	Sheffield
Shankhouse	5–4	Birtley
Small Heath	8–0	Hednesford Town
Southwick	6–0	Bishop Auckland Church Institute
Staveley	19–0	Walkley
Swindon Town	9–0	Maidenhead
Warmley	0–12	Walsall Town Swifts
Warwick County	1–3	Burslem Port Vale
Windsor Phoenix Athletic	6–1	Schorne College
Witton	1–4	Heywood Central
Wolverton	0–4	Marlow
Workington	W–W	Clitheroe
Replays
Saturday 18 October 1890
Shankhouse	5–1	Birtley

== Second qualifying round ==
Home team (tier)	Score	Away team (tier)
Saturday 25 October 1890
93rd Highland Regiment	3–2	Watford Rovers
Belper Town	4–2	Leeds Albion
Bishop Auckland	1–2	Newcastle East End
Bootle	1–0	Newton Heath
Burslem Port Vale	2–3	Walsall Town Swifts
Burton Swifts	2–1	Sheffield United
Chester	2–0	Northwich Victoria
City Ramblers	0–8	Old Carthusians
Cliftonville	W–W	Rhosllanerchrugog
Crusaders	6–1	Folkestone
Darlington	W–W	Darlington West End
Darlington St Augustine's	1–4	Middlesbrough
Doncaster Rovers	4–5	Kilnhurst
Ecclesfield	W–W	Grantham Rovers
Heywood Central	9–0	Gorton Villa
Ilford	2–0	Gravesend
Kidderminster	4–0	Oldbury Town
Langley Green Victoria	2–1	Great Bridge Unity
Halliwell	W–W	Ardwick
Leek	2–0	Druids
Lincoln City	9–0	Boston
London Caledonians	6–3	Old Etonians

Home team (tier)	Score	Away team (tier)
Long Eaton Rangers	7–3	Heanor Town
Loughborough	8–1	Burton Wanderers
Mansfield Town	0–4	Staveley
Matlock Town	1–0	Derby St Luke
Newark (Disqualified)	3–1	Beeston
Newcastle West End	8–1	Southwick
Thorpe	0–4	Ipswich Town
Owlerton	1–4	Rotherham Town
Rotherham Swifts	3–4	Jardines
Shankhouse	2–0	Ashington
South Bank	7–2	Port Clarence
South Shore	10–0	Workington
Stockton	1–2	Middlesbrough Ironopolis
Sunderland Albion	W–W	Whitburn
Swindon Town	2–0	Marlow
Windsor Phoenix Athletic	1–2	Hunts County
Wrexham	2–3	Nantwich
Wednesbury Old Athletic	0–2	Small Heath (disqualified)
Replays
Saturday 11 November 1890
Great Bridge Unity	4–2	Langley Green Victoria

== Third qualifying round ==
Home team (tier)	Score	Away team (tier)
Saturday 15 November 1890
93rd Highland Regiment	6–0	Swindon Town
Belper Town	2–6	Loughborough
Great Bridge Unity	1–0	Kidderminster
Halliwell	4–3	Bootle
Heywood Central	5–0	South Shore
Ilford	0–7	Crusaders
Ipswich Town	5–2	Hunts County
Leek	1–2	Cliftonville
Lincoln City	3–0	Ecclesfield
London Caledonians	2–0	Old Carthusians

Home team (tier)	Score	Away team (tier)
Long Eaton Rangers	4–1	Jardines
Middlesbrough	2–0	Darlington
Middlesbrough Ironopolis	6–1	South Bank
Nantwich	4–5	Chester
Newcastle East End	5–0	Shankhouse
Newcastle West End	0–3	Sunderland Albion
Rotherham Town	6–1	Beeston
Sheffield United	3–0	Matlock Town
Staveley	6–2	Kilnhurst
Walsall Town Swifts	5–3	Wednesbury Old Athletic F.C.

== Fourth qualifying round ==
Home team (tier)	Score	Away team (tier)
Saturday 12 December 1890
Chester	W–W	Cliftonville
Crusaders	4–2	London Caledonians
Halliwell	2–1	Heywood Central
Ipswich Town	1–4	93rd Highland Regiment
Kidderminster	3–0	Walsall Town Swifts
Lincoln City	4–1	Staveley
Long Eaton Rangers	2–1	Rotherham Town

Home team (tier)	Score	Away team (tier)
Middlesbrough Ironopolis	6–0	Darlington
Newcastle East End	2–2	Sunderland Albion
Sheffield United	6–1	Loughborough
Replays
Saturday 20 December 1890
Middlesbrough Ironopolis	3–0	Darlington
Newcastle East End	0–2	Sunderland Albion
