= John Lavery (footballer, born 1877) =

English footballer

Personal information
- Date of birth: 1877
- Position: Winger

Youth career
- Hammersmith Catholic Training College

Senior career*
Years	Team	Apps	(Gls)
1897	Gateshead NER		
1897	Sunderland	1	(0)
1897–1898	Gateshead NER		
1898–1899	Burton Swifts	30	(8)
1899–1???	Hebburn Argyle		
- * Club domestic league appearances and goals

John Lavery (1877 – after 1898) was an English professional footballer who played as a winger for Sunderland.
