= 1890–91 FA Cup =

Tournament details
- Country: England; Scotland; Wales; Ireland

Final positions
- Champions: Blackburn Rovers (5th title)
- Runners-up: Notts County

The 1890–91 FA Cup was the 20th edition of the world's oldest association football knockout competition, the Football Association Challenge Cup, or FA Cup.

== Qualifying rounds ==
Advancing from the qualifying rounds were Chester, Halliwell, Middlesbrough Ironopolis, Sunderland Albion, Sheffield United, Long Eaton Rangers, Lincoln City, Kidderminster, Crusaders (based in Leyton) and the team from the 93rd Highland Regiment, which was stationed in Aldershot at this time. Middlesbrough Ironopolis, Kidderminster and the 93rd Highland Regiment were featuring at this stage for the first time, with the Highlanders having gone on what is now considered the first giant-killing run through the FA Cup qualifying rounds. The military team defeated future Premier League members Luton Town (at Dunstable Road), Watford, Swindon Town and Ipswich Town (at Portman Road) to secure their place in the competition proper.

In order to bring the number of teams up to 32, a further 10 non-League clubs entered the competition in the first round proper. Stoke was exempted to this stage despite having been voted out of the Football League at that year's Annual General Meeting, while Clapton, Nottingham Forest, Darwen, Crewe Alexandra, Casuals, The Wednesday, Old Westminsters, Birmingham St George's and Royal Arsenal received byes.

For information on all matches played from the preliminary round to the fourth qualifying round, see 1890–91 FA Cup qualifying rounds.

== First round proper ==
Home club	Score	Away club	Date
Chester	1–0	Lincoln City	17 January 1891
Clapton	0–14	Nottingham Forest	17 January 1891
Darwen	3–1 Match void	Kidderminster	17 January 1891
Burnley	4–2	Crewe Alexandra	17 January 1891
Stoke	3–0	Preston North End	17 January 1891
Aston Villa	13–1	Casuals	17 January 1891
The Wednesday	12–0	Halliwell	17 January 1891
Accrington	2–2	Bolton Wanderers	17 January 1891
Long Eaton Rangers	1–2	Wolverhampton Wanderers	17 January 1891
West Bromwich Albion	Walkover	Old Westminsters	17 January 1891
Sunderland	1–0	Everton	17 January 1891
Crusaders	0–2	Birmingham St George's	17 January 1891
Sunderland Albion	2–0	93rd Highland Regiment	17 January 1891
Sheffield United	1–9	Notts County	17 January 1891
Royal Arsenal	1–2	Derby County	17 January 1891
Middlesbrough Ironopolis	1–2 Match void	Blackburn Rovers	17 January 1891

=== Replays ===
Home club	Score	Away club	Date
Darwen	13–0	Kidderminster	24 January 1891
Accrington	5–1	Bolton Wanderers	24 January 1891
Middlesbrough Ironopolis	0–3	Blackburn Rovers	24 January 1891

== Second round proper ==
Home club	Score	Away club	Date
Darwen	0–2	Sunderland	31 January 1891
Stoke	3–0	Aston Villa	31 January 1891
Notts County	2–1	Burnley	31 January 1891
Blackburn Rovers	7–0	Chester	31 January 1891
Accrington	2–3	Wolverhampton Wanderers	31 January 1891
Derby County	2–3	The Wednesday	31 January 1891
Sunderland Albion	1–1	Nottingham Forest	31 January 1891
Birmingham St George's	0–3	West Bromwich Albion	31 January 1891

=== Replays ===
Home club	Score	Away club	Date
Nottingham Forest	3–3	Sunderland Albion	7 February 1891
Nottingham Forest	5–0	Sunderland Albion	11 February 1891

== Third round proper ==
Home club	Score	Away club	Date
Notts County	1–0	Stoke	14 February 1891
Blackburn Rovers	2–0	Wolverhampton Wanderers	14 February 1891
The Wednesday	0–2	West Bromwich Albion	14 February 1891
Sunderland	4–0	Nottingham Forest	14 February 1891

== Semi finals ==
	Score		Date	Venue
Notts County	3–3	Sunderland	28 February 1891	
Blackburn Rovers	3–2	West Bromwich Albion	28 February 1891	Victoria Ground

=== Replay ===
Home club	Score	Away club	Date
Sunderland	0–2	Notts County	11 March 1891

== Final ==
Home club	Score	Away club	Date
Blackburn Rovers	3–1	Notts County	21 March 1891
