= Old Cranleighans =

Old Cranleighans may refer to:

- former pupils of Cranleigh School
- Old Cranleighans F.C.
