= Leeds Albion F.C. =

Former association football club in England

Leeds Albion
- Full name: Leeds Albion Association Football Club
- Founded: 1888
- Dissolved: 1892
- Ground: Cardigan Fields
- Hon. President: Mr A. Greenwood, J.P.
- Secretary: J. Morfitt, Alex. Hutchinson

Leeds Albion A.F.C. was an association football club from Leeds in Yorkshire, active in the late 19th century.

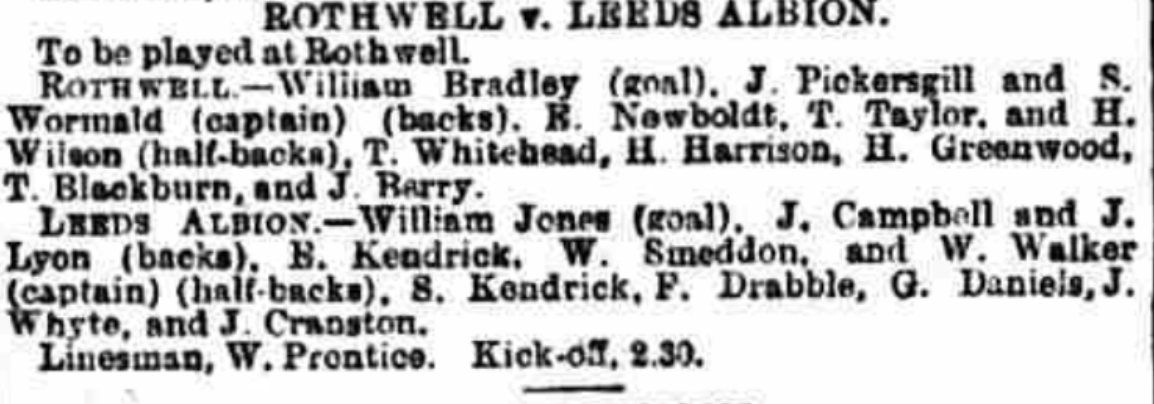
1891–92 FA Cup second qualifying round, Rothwell v Leeds Albion, provisional starting XIs, Sporting Life, 24 October 1891

== History ==
The club was founded in February 1888, at a time when the state of rugby football in Leeds was at a low ebb, and there was hope that the association code "will supplant that of the Rugby in Yorkshire". The club's first match had to wait until the 1888–89 season, and was a 3–1 win at Harrogate, Walker scoring the first Albion goal.

In 1890–91, the club was the first from the city to enter the FA Cup, playing its first match at Belper Town in the second qualifying round; the home side came from 2–0 down to win 4–2, in extra time. Albion also reached the semi-final of the East Riding Senior Cup, losing 2–1 at Scarborough.

The Albion entered the 1891–92 FA Cup, and gained its first win in the competition in a second round replay win over Rothwell. However the association code had met with almost total indifference, with some Leeds papers not even mentioning the Cup match while focussing in depth on rugby fixtures, and the attendance at the tie was a mere 1,000. as against 10,000 at Huddersfield and 5,000 for a rugby league game at nearby Wortley. Albion accepted an inducement from Darlington to scratch from the third round, allowing Darlington to play a more lucrative friendly with Middlesbrough instead. Albion does not seem to have played beyond February 1892, at least one player (Campbell) turning to the rugby league code.

== Ground ==
The club played at the Cardigan Fields, the same ground as the Leeds Albion Cricket Club, and the home of Leeds St John's until 1889. The ground was taken over in September 1892 by the Burley rugby club.
