= Schorne College F.C. =

Defunct football club in England

Schorne College
- Full name: Schorne College (Past & Present) F.C.
- Nickname(s): the Schornians, the Collegians
- Founded: 1883
- Dissolved: 1907
- Ground: Manor Field
- Secretary: M. C. Clare, A. H. James, E. B. T. Bond
colours

Schorne College F.C., more formally (and originally) known as Schorne College (Past & Present), was an association football team made up of current and former pupils of Schorne College in North Marston, Buckinghamshire.

== History ==
Although the club gave its foundation date as 1887, it was playing football by 1883 at the latest. The club first came to note in December 1886, when it startled the football world by beating Marlow - the result was particularly remarkable as Marlow fielded 8 of the XI which had reached the third round of the FA Cup. Six of the side in its first few seasons were the sons of the school's headmaster, Dr Samuel James, who was the parish rector.

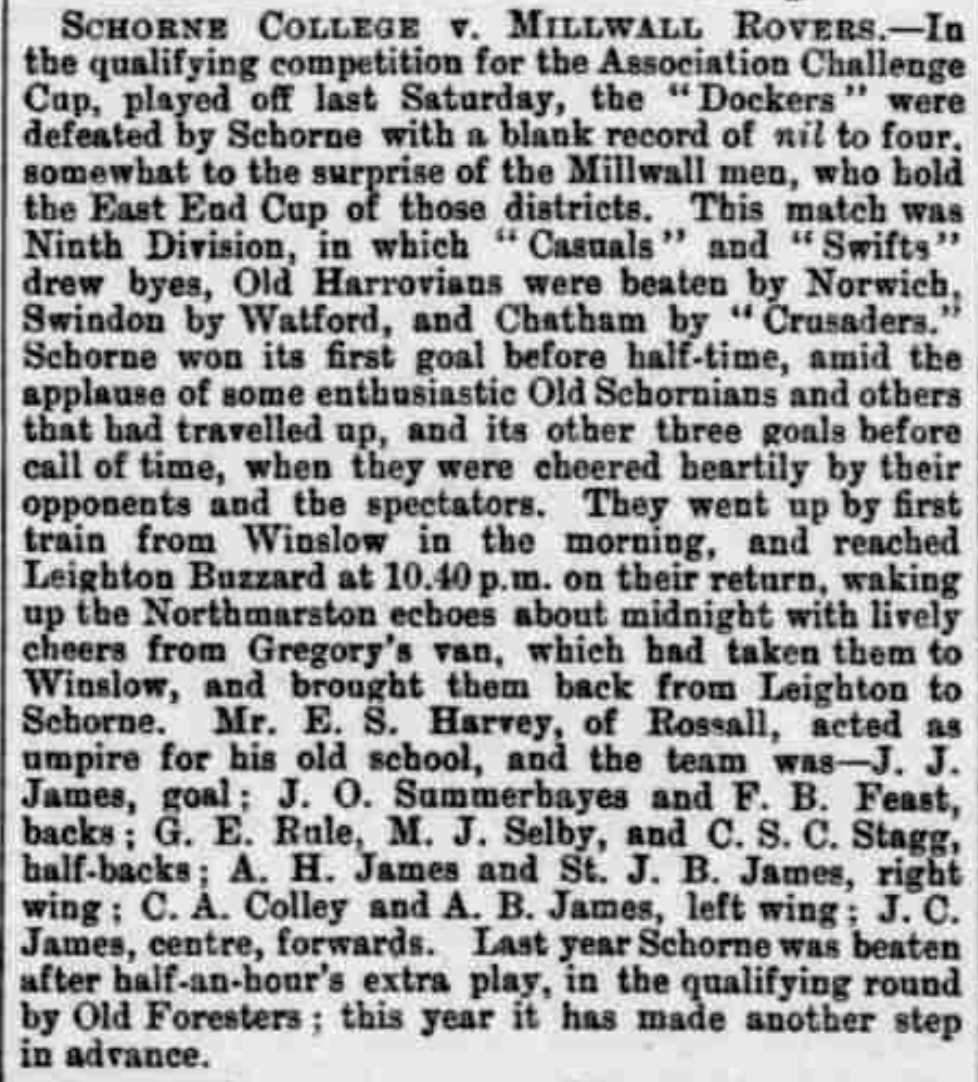
1889–90 FA Cup 1st qualifying round, Millwall 0–4 Schorne College, Bucks Herald, 12 October 1889

The club entered the Berks & Bucks Senior Cup for the first time in 1887–88, but scratched when drawn to visit Theale. Undaunted, the club entered the local cup and the national competition in 1888–89. The first qualifying round tie in the FA Cup against Old Foresters, at Snaresbrook, pointed up one issue with relying on school pupils - the scores were 2–2 after 90 minutes, but, in the optional extra-time period which the sides agreed, several of the Collegians went down with cramp, and the Foresters scored three further goals without reply.

The club was luckier in the local competition; drawn at home to Windsor, it offered to switch the tie to Aylesbury to assist the "wearers of the light blue and chocolate" in their travel, but Windsor was still forced to scratch. The Schornians lost 6–1 at home to Wolverton L. & N. W. in the second round.

The club's best win in competitive football came in the 1889–90 FA Cup qualifying rounds, by beating Millwall Athletic 4–0, away from home. The second round tie with Watford Rovers was played at the Vale of Aylesbury Cricket Ground, and the Schornians were doubly unlucky - one player had already been claimed by Swifts, and another got on the train to Oxford by mistake, and only turned up at Aylesbury when the match was over. Even so, the Schornians, 7 of whom were pupils at the college, were 1–0 ahead at the break thanks to a goal from J. J. James, but the side suffered even more bad luck, as the wind picked up in the second half when it was to the Rovers' backs, and the Watford side scored twice in the last quarter of an hour to go through.

The same season, the club recorded a remarkable 6–6 draw in the first round of the Berks & Bucks Senior Cup against Chesham (also at the Vale of Aylesbury ground), but lost in the replay.

The club was handicapped in competitions by losing its pupils over the Christmas and New Year break, at a time when the local cup was at the second round stage - Schorne duly scratched from the Berks & Bucks competition from 1890–91 to 1893–94 as a result. Indeed, the club was rarely able to bring a first XI together; it only played 3 times in the first half of 1890, losing all three matches. One of these matches was in the 1890–91 FA Cup qualifying rounds - a 6–1 defeat at Windsor Phoenix, the scores being 1–1 at half-time, but the Schornians conceding five playing into the wind in the second half.

With the various Jameses mostly going up to Oxford, the side withdrew from senior football, with the old boys mostly playing for the North Marston village side. The school was still playing football at a reportable level until the 1906–07 season. However the number of pupils had been shrinking - by 1909 it was down to 3 - and the college closed for good in 1910.

== Colours ==
The club wore black and white shirts.

== Ground ==
The club played most matches on Manor Field, near the college, but for Cup matches, which required an enclosure for which admission could be charged, the club used the Vale of Aylesbury Cricket Ground, on New Road in Aylesbury.
