= Windsor Phoenix F.C. =

Former association football club in England

Windsor Phœnix F.C.
- Full name: Windsor Phœnix Football Club
- Founded: 1881
- Dissolved: 1892
- Ground: Balloon Meadow
Home colours

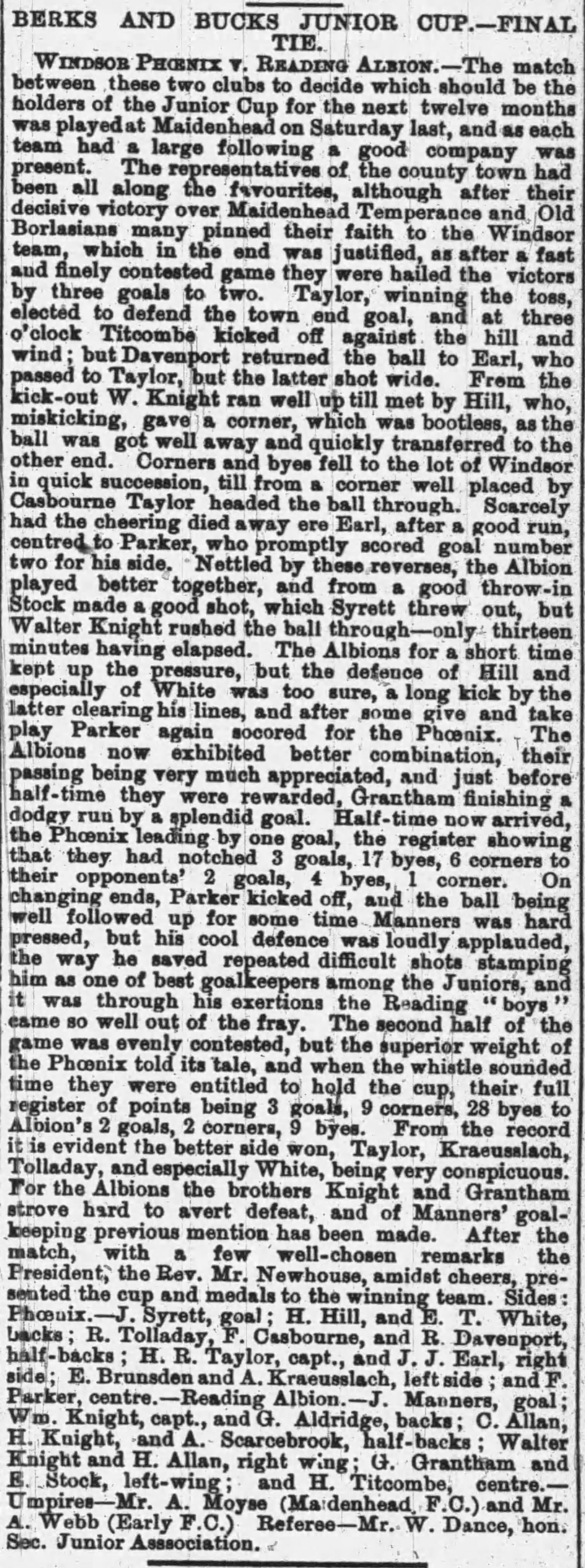
1887–88 Berks and Bucks Junior Cup final, Windsor Phoenix 3–2 Reading Albion, Bucks Free Press, 16 March 1888

Windsor Phoenix Football Club was an association football club from Windsor, Berkshire, active in the late Victorian era.

== History ==
The Windsor Phoenix Athletic Club was formed in 1881, and it started to play association football against other sides in earnest in 1883; the club was therefore sometimes called Windsor Phoenix Athletic. The club had some high profile patronage - after the Rev. S. Hawtrey died in 1886, he was replaced as vice-president by Viscount Curzon MP.

Its earliest competitive football came in the Berks & Bucks Junior Cup - a defeat at Maidenhead Norfolkians in the first round in 1886 being considered a considerable shock - and the club's first success came in the competition in the 1887–88 season, upsetting competition favourites Reading Albion with a 3–2 win at Maidenhead, all of the goals coming in the first half. The club also won the Henesey Trophy, a competition arranged by Uxbridge, in 1889–90, 500 people seeing the club beat Colnbrook 4–0 in the final.

Phœnix entered the FA Cup for the first time in the 1890–91 FA Cup qualifying rounds, and started with an impressive 6–1 win over Schorne College at Clewer, scoring five in the second half without reply. The club lost its second round match at home to Hunts County, but finished the season with its greatest triumph, winning the Berks & Bucks Senior Cup for the only time, hammering the 2nd Scots Guards at Maidenhead.

However its 1891–92 season was far less successful; the club entered 5 Cup competitions, and exited in the first round in four of them, the exception being the Senior, in which the club reached the semi-final. A pointer to the future came at Easter 1892, when Phoenix accepted players from other clubs under the name Windsor United for a series of exhibition matches, and, following a meeting in July 1892, the Phoenix and Windsor St Albans clubs agreed to merge permanently, into a side to be known as Windsor & Eton Football Club; Windsor & Eton Victoria was also represented at the meeting, but (for the moment) declined the invitation. Phoenix had already accepted a place in the Southern Alliance, which the new club took up, and the name Windsor Phoenix was revived for a junior club in the late 1890s.

== Colours ==
The club colours were dark and light blue.

== Ground ==
The club originally played in the Home Park, Windsor. When required to have enclosed accommodation, it moved to the Balloon Meadow, in Clewer, and used the Swan Hotel as facilities.
