= Barrow A.F.C. (1889) =

Association football club active in the late 19th century

- Full name: Barrow Association Football Club
- Nicknames: the Amber and Blacks, the Shipyard Men
- Founded: 1889
- Dissolved: 1893
- Ground: Parade Ground
Home colours

Barrow Association Football Club was an association football club from Barrow-in-Furness, then in Lancashire, active in the late 19th century.

== History ==
The club was founded in 1889; it was the third senior club in the town, after the short-lived Barrow Rangers and Barrow-in-Furness clubs from the early 1880s.

The club entered the FA Cup for the first time in 1891–92, losing 3–1 at home to Fleetwood Rangers in the first qualifying round, unable to recover after conceding two early goals. It brought in several players from Scotland for the 1892–93 season, and beat Fairfield 4–1 at home in the first FA Cup qualifying round that season, its goals being an own goal, a free-kick from Saddington, and two from Peacock "banged through in fine style". In the second qualifying round it lost to Rossendale, handicapped by three men having had to work a night shift before the tie and two others having to walk 2 miles from station to ground, as the only cab in Rossendale was being used for a funeral; it had started the season with a friendly defeat at the new Liverpool Football Club.

The club was elected to the Lancashire League before the 1893–94 season, but the extra expense, coupled with "the state of trade in Barrow", proved crippling; the club resigned from the League on 20 November 1893, having lost all 7 of its fixtures, scoring 1 goal (in a 5–1 defeat at Fleetwood Rangers) but conceding 36. Rather than its fixtures being expunged, its record was taken over by North-east Lancashire League side Bacup, who managed to earn 9 points from the remaining 15 fixtures, albeit not enough to lift the combined effort from the foot of the table. The season had also seen the club's sole fixture in the Lancashire Senior Cup, which had been a similar disaster, the club losing 10–0 at West Manchester.

Shorn of its best players, the club did try to continue, but a 4–1 defeat at Skerton at the end of 1893 seems to have been the final game of any note.

== Colours ==
The club wore amber and black striped shirts, with black "pants".

== Ground ==
The club played at the Parade Ground in Abbey Road, near Ramsden Square. It originally used the Adelphi Hotel for correspondence. Its highest recorded crowd was 2,000 for the Fleetwood Cup tie in 1891.
