= Royton A.F.C. =

Defunct association football club from Lancashire

- Full name: Royton Association Football Club
- Founded: 1886
- Dissolved: 1894
- Ground: Middleton Road
- Secretary: W. Wood
Home colours

Royton A.F.C. was an association football club from Royton, Lancashire, active in the 19th century.

== History ==
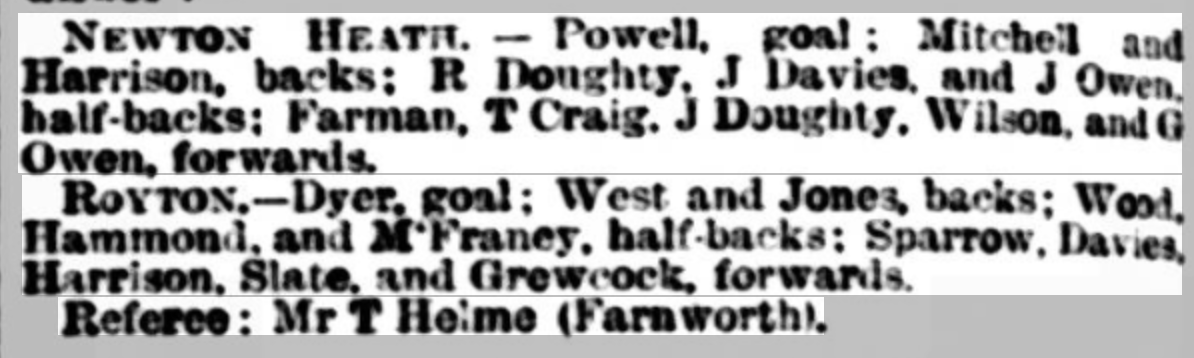
Line-ups for the 1889–90 Manchester Senior Cup Final, Newton Heath v Royton, Athletic News, 5 May 1890

The first football club with the Royton name was a rugby union club which dissolved in 1885. The earliest reference to the association club is from the 1886–87 season.

Its first success of any note was reaching the Manchester & District Cup final in 1889–90, against Newton Heath at Hullard Hall. The Royton following, which made up a majority of the 4,000 crowd, were optimistic of success, and after going behind early, Royton took a 2–1 lead through a goal by Slate and a scrimmage which forced the ball home. By half-time however the scores were level, and the Heathens scored two early second-half goals, running out 5–2 winners.

The club was a founder member of the Lancashire Combination in 1891–92, and finished third in the first season. It also entered the 1891–92 FA Cup qualifying rounds for its only tilt at the national competition, and beat fellow Combination side Halliwell 6–3 at home at the first stage, aided by Halliwell's full-back Flitcroft having to retire from the match early on due to an injury. However, Halliwell played the tie under protest, as it had measured the ground as being 15 yards too short and 8 yards too narrow, and, together with Royton admitting that a linesman was a member of the Royton club, the Football Association awarded the tie to the visitors.

In the 1892–93 Combination Royton dropped to 7th out of 11 clubs. However, ten games into the 1893–94 season, the club was bottom, with 1 win and 9 defeats, and having scored 10 goals while conceding 62. This does not include the club's final match, on 2 December 1893, at home to Preston North End Reserves, which kicked off in semi-darkness at 4.10pm due to the visitors' late arrival, and was abandoned after 25 minutes, the North Enders already two goals to the good. By the middle of January 1894, the club was noted as having "become defunct".

== Colours ==
The club played in black and white vertical stripes.

== Ground ==
The club's ground was off the Middleton Road.
