= Hunts County F.C. =

Defunct association football club in Huntingdonshire

Hunts County
- Full name: Hunts County Football Club
- Founded: 1887
- Dissolved: 1894
- Ground: Hinchingbrooke Park
- President: Edward Montagu, 8th Earl of Sandwich
- Secretary: A. K. Bower

Hunts County F.C., sometimes referred to as Huntingtdon County, was an association football club from the County of Huntingdonshire, active in the 19th century.

== History ==
Teams for the Ipswich Town v Hunts County FA Cup tie in 1890–91, Suffolk Chronicle 22 November 1890

The club was formed on 15 September 1887, at a meeting of local players the George Hotel in Huntingdon, with half-back A. K. Bower elected as captain and club secretary. The aim was to form a representative Huntingdonshire Football Association side to face other county associations, and to take part in competitions made up of the best county players, given none of the local sides were of the required standards. The weakness of the county as compared with others is that, as a representative side, the club won one, and lost four, of its five matches in 1889–90.

County entered the FA Cup qualifying rounds for the first time in 1890–91, and made it through to the third stage (equivalent of the second round proper today), with a 3–1 win at home to Norwich C.E.Y.M.S. (before 500 spectators) and a win at Windsor Phoenix. The club's run came to an end at Ipswich Town; the home side started a man short, as Francis Peecock was detained on some business, and County took advantage by taking an early lead, Frank Goodliff heading home a rebound from his own shot. Ipswich equalized just before the break and early in the second half Hunts took advantage of a free-kick for hands to scrimmage the ball home for a 2–1 lead. However Hunts were forced on the defensive for the rest of the match, ultimately going down 5–2.

The club never again won a national Cup tie. In the qualifying rounds the following season, it was hammered in its first tie 6–1 against the Old Etonians at the Essex County Ground in Leyton; the County side was not particularly representative, neither first choice goalkeeper Brackenbury or second choice Dexter being available, and the County goal was a late consolation from Sargeant. In the 1892–93 FA Cup qualifying rounds, the club was fancied to beat the moribund Swifts at home, but instead went down 3–2, the game notable for not having a half-time break in order to allow the Swifts to catch a train back to London.

In 1893–94, Hunts eschewed the FA Cup for the FA Amateur Cup, and in its only tie it was on the receiving end of a 12–1 shellacking from Rushden.

The club had more or less ceased operations by 1894, with no gate receipts from the preceding season, and even the association failed to put up the Fellowes Cup for competition in 1893–94. Despite committee optimism in September 1894, the Hunts County F.C. did not take part in club competition again.

== Ground ==
The club played at Hinchingbrooke Park, granted by club president Edward Montagu, 8th Earl of Sandwich.
