= Heywood Central F.C. =

Heywood Central
- Full name: Heywood Central Football Club
- Nickname: Central
- Founded: 1887
- Dissolved: January 1896
- Ground: Phoenix Ground (also known as Bamford Road)
Home colours

Heywood Central F.C. was a short-lived association football club from the town of Heywood in Lancashire.

== History ==
The club was formed in 1887 following a merger between two local clubs, Heywood Rovers and Heywood Olympic. It entered the 1887–88 FA Cup, for the first time (as well as the Lancashire Junior Cup). When arriving at FA Cup first round opponents Higher Walton, the club decided to scratch, and play the fixture as a friendly instead, which Higher Walton won 8–1.

The Junior Cup competition was more the club's level, and there was obvious support for the club, as over 4,000 made it to the Phoenix ground for the third round victory over Bury. The club lost in the semi-final to Blackpool 2–0; the match was played at Preston North End's Deepdale ground and Blackpool brought around 1,500 fans, Central around 600.

=== FA Cup ===
After its abortive first FA Cup entry, the club entered again in 1888–89, but lost in the first qualifying round to Astley Bridge. In 1890–91, the club gained both its first win in the competition, 4–1 at Witton in the first qualifying round, and its biggest win in the competition, 9–0 against Gorton Villa in the second qualifying round. The club however never made it to the first round proper, falling at the final hurdle in 1890–91 to Halliwell. Central protested on the grounds that one of the umpires had been a member of the Halliwell club, but Halliwell proved that the umpire had only been a member of the Halliwell Cricket Club, which had no links with the football club, and the Football Association dismissed the appeal.

=== Lancashire League ===
In 1889-90, the club was a founder member of the Lancashire League, alongside town rivals Heywood. The club was initially successful, finishing third in its first two seasons. The club also entered the Lancashire Senior Cup from 1891–92 to 1894–95 but never got past the first round.

The club lost £100 over the 1890–91 season, with Heywood losing £70, and in the summer of 1891 there were discussions as to amalgamating Heywood and Central. Despite misgivings that club rivalries could make such an agreement impossible, a "merger" was agreed on 1 December 1891, although it was in substance a takeover of Heywood by Central, as the resulting club retained the Central name and played at the Central ground.

Despite this merger, the increase in professionalism, the augmentation of the Football League, and the marginalization of the Lancashire League all contributed to a financial crisis for the club. In December 1893 the club was forced to release "three of their most expensive men". The result was the club dropped from mid-table in the Lancashire League in 1892-93 to bottom but one in 1893–94 and bottom in 1894–95.

The club therefore resigned from the league at the end of the season and the liquidation of the club was announced in January 1896. The club had debts of £550, and offered creditors a dividend of 1s 6d in the £, or a 7.5% return.

In 1900, the Hooley Bridge club changed its name to Heywood Central, but it had no link with the original club.

== Colours ==
The club's colours originally were red and white "quarters", which, in modern vocabulary, refers to halves. At the start of the 1893–94 the club changed to blue and white jerseys.

== Ground ==
The club played at the Phoenix Athletic Ground on Bamford Road.

== Notable players ==
- Tommy Crawshaw, future England international, left the club in 1894
- Jimmy Crabtree, future England international, played for the club in 1891-92
