= 1st Highland Light Infantry F.C. =

Former association football club

1st Highland Light Infantry
- Full name: 1st Battalion Highland Light Infantry F.C.
- Nicknames: the Jocks, the Highlanders
- Founded: 1881?
- Dissolved: 1959?
- Ground: varied per stationing
Home colours

The 1st Battalion Highland Light Infantry F.C., usually referred to as the 1st Highland Light Infantry or 1st H.L.I., was an association football club formed out of the infantry regiment of the same name.

== History ==
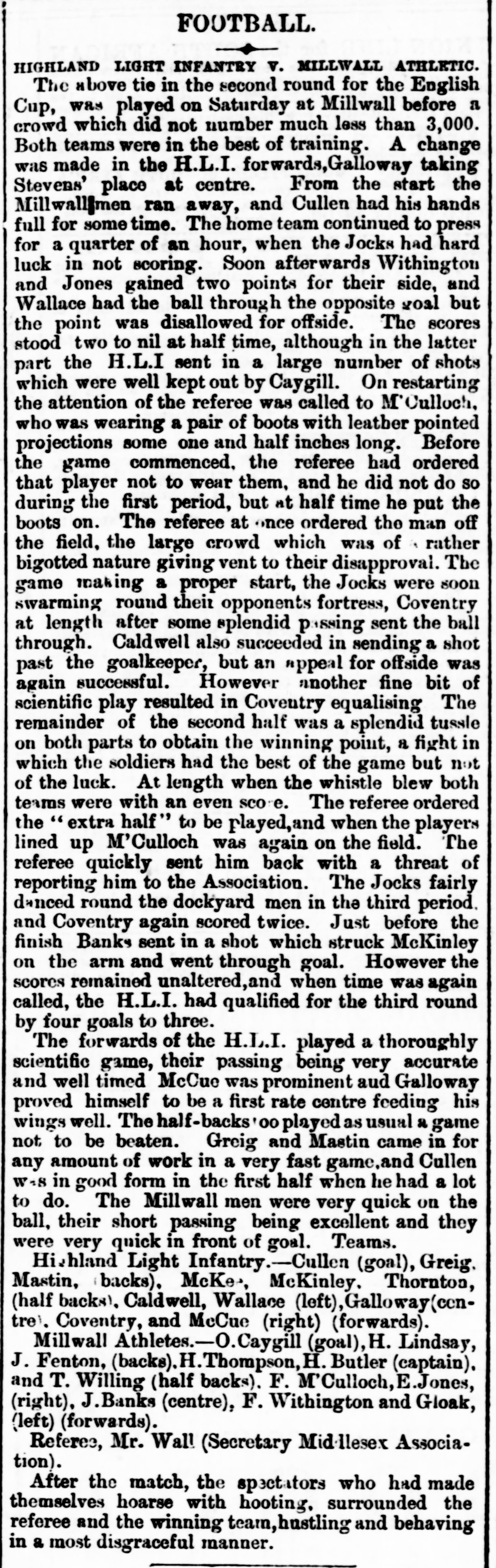
1891–92 FA Cup 2nd qualifying round, Millwall Athletic 3–4 1st Highland Light Infantry, Dover Express, 30 October 1891

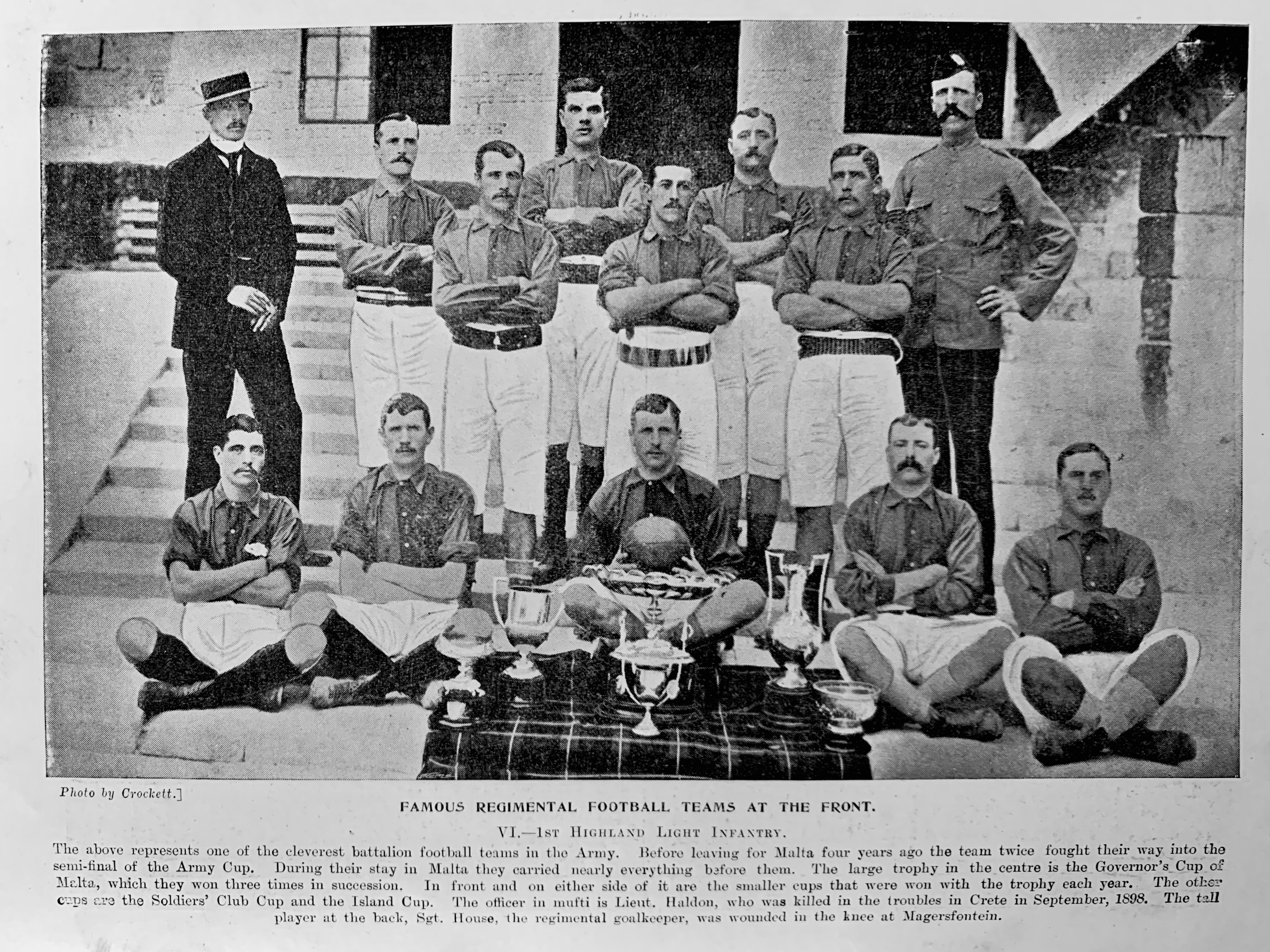
1897–98 1st Highland Light Infantry FC, with trophies won while stationed in Malta

The club appears to have been active soon after the foundation of the battalion in 1881, and in 1885, when stationed in Belfast, considered entering the Irish Cup. Especially in its early days, the side was referred to as the 71st Highlanders, the 1st Battalion having formed out of the 71st Regiment.

In 1891, the club reached the final of the Chatham and Rochester Charity Cup. Before the 1891–92 season, the club joined the Football Association, and entered the FA Cup qualifying rounds. It continued to enter the competition until 1894–95, three times reaching the third qualifying round, at which stage there were 40 clubs left in the competition. The club's most notable scalp was Millwall Athletic in the second qualifying round in 1891–92, coming from 2–0 down to level the score 2–2 after 90 minutes, and winning 4–3 in the then-permitted extra-time period, all four goals being scored by Coventry. The FA threw out a Millwall protest against the referee ordering an Athletic player from the pitch for wearing illegal boots.

The XI's greatest honour came later in the 1891–92 season, when it won the Kent Senior Cup for the only time, hammering Gravesend 11–0 in the final, at Chatham, left-winger Caldwell scoring 5 of the goals; the reserve XI had also won the Junior Cup earlier in the season, a record only previously achieved by Royal Arsenal. The club also beat St Bernards, then a leading Scottish side, at Aldershot in a friendly in November 1892.

The club entered the FA Amateur Cup in 1894–95 and 1899–1900, albeit it never seems to have played a tie, twice winning through rounds walkover and then in turn scratching, the last time due to the battalion being posted to South Africa.

In 1893–94 and 1894–95, the club reached the semi-final of the Army Football Association Cup, and it won the Aldershot Divisional FA Cup on its first instalment in 1894–95. After the regiment was posted to Malta in 1896, the football side won the Governor's Cup three times, Soldiers' Club Cup, and Island Cup, all by 1900.

The battalion largely served abroad until the end of the First World War and only appeared once more in senior football. This was in the 1949–50 season, when it took part in the Highland Football League, but the Highlanders finished bottom, with only 3 wins in 30 games. The following season the battalion was sent to Colchester and afterwards seems only to have played Army football until the battalion's merger with the Royal Scots Fusiliers in 1959 to form the Royal Highland Fusiliers.

== Colours ==
The club wore halved shirts, probably in the regimental colours of scarlet and green, with white shorts.

== Ground ==
The club's ground depended on where the battalion was based. In 1890–91 and 1891–92 it was based at the Shaft Barracks in Dover, but, due to lack of on-barracks facilities, had to use any available ground, such as the Dover Cricket Ground or Crabble Meadows, for competitive fixtures. Before the 1892–93 season the battalion moved to Stanhope Lines in Aldershot and in 1895, despite hopes of moving to Colchester, the 1st was sent to Malta, preventing it from taking part in English football.

The club played its last season in senior football, in 1949–50, at Fort George near Inverness.

== Notable figures ==
The club's secretary in the 1890s was Captain the Hon. Henry Anson, third son of Thomas Anson, 2nd Earl of Lichfield.
