= St Ann's Ground =

Cricket ground in Barnes, England

Coordinates: 51.4757°N 0.2473°W

Ground information
- Location: Barnes, Surrey
- Establishment: 1889 (first recorded match)

Team information
Lyric Club	(1890)
- As of 28 August 2010; Source: Ground profile

St Ann's Ground was a cricket ground at Barnes, Surrey (now in the London Borough of Richmond upon Thames). In 1889 the Lyric Club played the Marylebone Cricket Club in a non first-class match. The only first-class match held at the ground came in 1890 when the Lyric Club played the touring Australians, which the Lyric Club won by 96 runs. The final important match at the ground, in 1892, was between the Lyric Club and the Marylebone Cricket Club. The ground was located within the grounds of St Ann's House, which in the early 1900s it was built over. The approximate location of the house today would be near Lyric Road and St Ann's Road, which are near the River Thames.
