= Hurworth F.C. =

Defunct English football club (1881–1900)

Hurworth
- Full name: Hurworth Football Club
- Nickname: the Hurworthians
- Founded: 1881
- Dissolved: 1900
- Ground: Bay Horse
- Secretary: 1883: J. Whewell; 1891–93: G. Kirby
colours

Hurworth Football Club was an association football club from Hurworth-on-Tees, near Darlington, England, active in the 19th century.

== History ==
The club was founded in 1881, one of its prime movers being the Rev. W. Deane. Relying solely on local talent, the club first came to notice in beating Gateshead Association in reaching the quarter-final of the Durham Senior Cup in 1889–90.

Notwithstanding that this run ended with an 8–0 defeat at home to Cup holders Darlington St Augustine's, the club joined the Football Association in 1890 and entered the 1890–91 FA Cup qualifying rounds, being drawn at home to Stockton for its debut tie. Stockton paid Hurworth £11 to switch the tie to Stockton, and hammered the Hurworthites by 14 goals to 0, 11 of the goals coming in the second half, when Stockton had the wind in its favour; even so the goalkeeping of Crowe earned praise, the blame for the defeat being put on the "worse than useless" half-backs.

The club recovered enough to reach the third qualifying round in 1892–93, the equivalent of the first round today, surviving a protest from railway side West Hartlepool N.E.R. in relation to its first qualifying round victory. Paired with Darlington, the club was facing a likely heavy defeat, and instead accepted a consideration to scratch, which allowed Darlington to play a more lucrative friendly against Stockton - which had similarly persuaded Loftus F.C. to cede its tie.

The club's last national cup tie was a 4–1 home defeat to Leadgate Park in the first of the 1893–94 FA Cup qualifying rounds, albeit the result was considered harsh on the Hurworthians, who had had most of the play.

The club played out its final years in the Darlington & District League; it had arranged fixtures for the 1900–01 season, but by October had disbanded.

== Colours ==
The club's colours were blue and white.

== Ground ==
The club's ground was at the Bay Horse inn.
