= Whitburn F.C. (England) =

Whitburn
- Full name: Whitburn Football Club
- Nickname: the Village Team
- Founded: 1882
- Dissolved: 1932
- Ground: Seabank
- President: Sir Hedworth Williamson, Bart.
- Secretary: T. K. Dobson (1880s-90s)
Home colours

Whitburn F.C. was an English association club based in Whitburn, near Sunderland, then in County Durham.

== History ==
The club was founded in September 1882, "at a meeting held at Mr Tinkler's". One of the club's founders, Alfred Grundy, who played in goal for the club, was the first secretary of the Durham County Football Association.

The club's earliest prominence came when it reached the semi-final of the Durham Senior Cup in 1886–87 and was only narrowly beaten by Sunderland at the latter's Newcastle Road ground; captain Dobson gave the village side a first-minute lead, and, after going 3–1 down, Whitburn brought the score back to 3–3, and had a goal disallowed for offside, before two late goals - one a deflection - put the favourites into the final. The next season, the club entered the FA Cup for the first time, and was drawn at home to Middlesbrough. Whitburn switched the tie, but was doubly disappointed, as bad weather kept the crowd down to 500, thus negating the supposed income advantage, and Whitburn went down 4–0.

It continued to enter the newly instituted qualifying rounds until 1891–92, never winning through to the first round proper again. Its final tie was a remarkable match in the second qualifying round, losing 10–4 to Gateshead N.E.R. in a match that was level at 4–4 after 90 minutes, but the Railwaymen ran riot in extra-time (available as an option to clubs at the time).

As professionalism dominated, Whitburn stayed resolutely amateur, but had some success on a local level. It played in the North-Eastern league in 1889–90, although the league petered out before completion, with the club close behind leaders Morpeth Harriers when the competition faded away. The club thereupon became one of the founder members of the Northern Football Alliance in July 1890, but after finishing in the bottom two in 1892–93 it was not re-elected.

In May 1894, the club was elected to the Wearside League, a competition which the club remained in until its demise. The club's reserves won the Sunderland Junior League in 1894–95, and the first team won the Wearside League for the only time in 1896–97.

The club long suffered from financial instability. It came close to disbanding in 1922 when only 2 people turned up to its annual general meeting, and finally did so in June 1932, owing to a mix of debt (in its final season, the club took a loss of £13, against income of £65) and uncertainty about its ground. A new Whitburn club started up in 1949, which lasted until the 1970s.

== Colours ==
The club wore amber and black stripes with white shorts.

== Ground ==
The club's first ground was on the Seabank, and it originally used the Jolly Sailor public house for its facilities. It moved to a new ground, between Lizard Lane and Bryers Street, in 1887, its first game there being a 12–1 win over Hebburn on 1 October; the new ground never seems to have had a more specific name than "the Whitburn ground".

== Notable players ==
- Jimmy Seed, who played for Whitburn before the First World War.
- William Stephenson, who left the club for Hull City in 1907.
- Jimmy Hugall, goalkeeper sold to Clapton Orient in 1910.
