= Uxbridge F.C. =

Association football club in England

Coordinates: 51°30′51″N 0°27′28″W

Uxbridge
- Full name: Uxbridge Football Club
- Nickname: The Reds
- Founded: 3 February 1871; 155 years ago
- Ground: Honeycroft, Yiewsley
- Capacity: 3,770
- Chairman: Mark Bantock
- Manager: Danny Edwards
- League: Southern League Premier Division South
- 2025–26: Southern League Premier Division South, 9th of 22
Home colours	Away colours

Uxbridge Football Club is a football club representing Uxbridge, based in Yiewsley, in the London Borough of Hillingdon, England. They were established in 1871 and are one of the oldest clubs in the South of England. They were founding members of the Southern League Division Two in 1894 and are currently members of the Southern League Premier Division South. The club is affiliated to the Middlesex County Football Association and play at Honeycroft.

== History ==
=== Early years ===
Uxbridge Football Club was founded on 3 February 1871 in an inaugural meeting attended by the Rev. T. S. Shepherd and local men, Hubert Heron, Frank Heron, P. Aldworth, F. J. Smith, R. T. Smith, W. M. Gardiner, W. Fassnidge, E. White, and P. White. At the meeting Mr. William Mansfield Gardiner was appointed president and a committee of four elected to manage the club. It was agreed that the established rules of the club be those of the 'Football Association of London', the subscriptions would be fixed at 2s. 6d. per annum and 'that the uniform of the club consist of a white jersey with light blue Maltese cross and a light blue velvet scull cap with silver tassel'.

The team started by playing friendly return games. Four nearby towns had formed clubs in the months before Uxbridge F.C. had been established. Windsor Home Park had been formed in September 1870, Maidenhead in October 1870, Marlow on the 22 November 1870 and the Swifts club of Slough in the new year of 1871. Uxbridge's first game was not recorded but was likely to have been played against Marlow on Uxbridge Common as the return game at Marlow took place on 8 April 1871. Other recorded return games in 1871 and early 1872 were played against Windsor Home Park, Maidenhead and Southall. The game against Southall on 21 October 1871 would be that club's first recorded game.

Uxbridge Football Club's first games:
February or March 1871 Marlow Home
8 April 1871 Marlow Away
18 October 1871 Windsor Home Park Home
21 October 1871 Southall Away
25 November 1871 Maidenhead Away
2 December 1871 Windsor Home Park Away
20 January 1872 Southall Home
10 February 1872 Maidenhead Home

Uxbridge's first captain was Reginald T. Smith who served until 2 September 1873, when Hubert Heron was appointed captain and hon. secretary at the club's annual general meeting (AGM). By this time, Hubert Heron had gained a full international cap as a forward for England in the 2nd annual game against Scotland on 8 March 1873. As Uxbridge captain, he would gain a further cap at the 3rd annual game on 7 March 1874.

From the start of the club some Uxbridge players would also play for Windsor Home Park and Swifts. However, the F.A. Cup competition which was initiated in the 1871–72 season had a rule (rule 3) which stated that 'no individual shall be allowed to play for more than one competing Club'. In the 1872–73 FA Cup Uxbridge players Hubert Heron, his brother Frank Heron, G. Turner and club president William Mansfield Gardiner played for Windsor Home Park in their three competition ties against Reigate Priory, South Norwood and Maidenhead.They were joined by Uxbridge captain Reginald T. Smith for the South Norwood and Maidenhead ties.

All with the exception of Reginald T. Smith represented Uxbridge when the club made its FA Cup debut in the 1873–74 competition which resulted in a 3–0 first round win over Gitanos at Uxbridge Common on 28 October 1873. In the second round tie on 26 November 1873, they faced eventual finalists the Royal Engineers on Uxbridge Common which ended in a 2–1 defeat.

In the following season, at a club committee meeting on 19 October 1874, Hubert Heron advised he would be playing for Wanderers in the forthcoming 1874–75 FA Cup competition. The issue was compounded when G. Turner and Hubert Heron's brothers Frank and Henry elected to play for Swifts in their FA Cup 1st-round game against Old Etonians on 5 November 1874. The consequence of the loss of players was Uxbridge having to scratch their FA Cup 1st-round game against Windsor Home Park which was to have taken place on 7 November 1874.

The withdrawal from the 1874–75 F.A. Cup with Uxbridge's best players wishing to play for other teams would lead to the club being disbanded for five years. At a general meeting of members at the Railway Hotel in Uxbridge on 18 November 1874, it was decided that the club should be dissolved, '...brought about, not from any want of funds, but owing to disagreements amongst members, occasioned chiefly by the club being unable to engage in the contest for the Association Challenge Cup, in consequence of a few of the members preferring to play for neighbouring clubs, rather than cast their lot with Uxbridge.' Writing of the club's dissolution a week later the Maidenhead Advertiser stated; 'This is much to be regretted, as the club was one of the strongest out of London, and was looked upon as likely to stand a good outside chance for the Association cup ; but we understand that the Captain deserted his club to play for one of the London teams, and thereby obliged the rest of the members to come to the unpleasant conclusion they did.' Hubert Heron would go on to receive an F.A. Cup winners medal three times with Wanderers in 1876, 1877, and 1878.

By 18 November 1874, the Uxbridge Crescents Football Club had been formed. A match against Misbourne House of Chalfont took place that afternoon on Uxbridge Common. A game against junior club Swallows F.C. on Uxbridge Common was played on 7 January 1875 ending in a 1–0 defeat. On 5 January 1876 a 1–0 win was recorded against Windsor Grosvenor also on Uxbridge Common. In the 1876–77 season games are recorded against senior clubs Maidenhead and Windsor Home Park. After this period, only two Crescents games are recorded before 1883, a local derby on 12 November 1881 against Uxbridge Caxtonians on Uxbridge Common, and also on Uxbridge Common a game against Padcroft College on 11 November 1882.

An attempt to revive Uxbridge F.C. was made by William Mansfield Gardiner in October 1876, but the undertaking failed to proceed at that time. The club was reformed for the 1879–80 season with three recorded matches being played in November 1879. The first game was played at Amersham F.C. on 12 November 1879 resulting in a 4–1 win for Uxbridge. This was followed by a game at Slough Rangers on 22 November 1879 ending in a 3–1 defeat. Another away game took place on 29 November 1879 against Watford United resulting in a 1–1 draw. The return game against Amersham took place at Uxbridge on 7 February 1880 ending in a 1–0 win for Uxbridge. On 18 February 1880, Uxbridge played Padcroft at the college grounds in Yiewsley culminating in a 2–1 win.

Uxbridge's opening game of the 1880–81 season took place on 27 October 1880 on Uxbridge Common against Slough Rangers resulting in a 2–1 defeat. Other return games that season were played against Acton, Amersham, Chesham, Colnbrook, Eton Albion, Etonians, Marlow, Watford United, Windsor Grosvenor and Windsor Home Park. At their AGM on 29 April 1881 chaired by president William Mansfield Gardiner, it was stated that in the 1880–81 season, the club had won 12 out of 22 matches with 5 drawn and 5 lost. It was decided that the club should rejoin the Football Association.

At the club's AGM on 23 August 1883, it was announce by Captain and Hon. Secretary Mr. W. A. Hancock, that Uxbridge had played 18 games in the 1882–83 season, 14 of which they had won with one of the others resulting in a tie. It was stated that the club had over 50 members, the majority of whom played and that the club would be entering the Association Challenge Cup for the forthcoming season. In the 1883–84 FA Cup first round, Uxbridge played Rochester at home on 3 November 1883 but lost 2–1. At the club's AGM on 21 August 1884, Mr. Hancock reported that in the 1883–84 season the club had played 26 games of which they had won 14, six were drawn and six lost.

Uxbridge played their first home game of the 1884–85 season on 25 October 1884 against Colnbrook at their new ground, Mr S. W. Light's Field, winning the game 2–0. In the 1884–85 FA Cup first round on 8 November 1884 the club were drawn at home against Hotspur F.C. They were watched by 500-600 spectators, but were defeated 3–1. In the 1885–86 FA Cup they again lost in the first round, this time 5–0 to Old Wykehamists F.C. at Home Park in Windsor on 31 October 1885.

On 22 August 1885, the West Middlesex Football Association was established with both Uxbridge F.C. and Uxbridge Crescents becoming members. Uxbridge F.C. committee's decision to join the association was approved at the club's AGM on 8 September 1885. A West Middlesex Association challenge cup competition was inaugurated for the 1885–86 season.

One of the West Middlesex Cup semi-final ties was played between Uxbridge F.C. and Uxbridge Crescents on 13 February 1886. The game took place at Mr. S. W. Light's field in the presence of between four and five hundred spectators. The Crescents went ahead just before half-time with Uxbridge's goalkeeper, S. W. Light, being beaten by a shot into the top corner of the goal by Crescent's H. Blunden. After changing ends, Uxbridge equalized with a goal by C. Heron. A determined second half followed with each team striving to gain the upper hand. Nearing the end of the game Crescent's centre, W. Drinkwater hit a long shot which looked like it was going over but struck the underside of the bar, winning the contest for Crescents 2–1. In the final tie on 20 March 1886, Uxbridge Crescents won the Challenge cup by defeating Acton 4–1 at Southall's ground.

=== Amalgamation ===
Since the 1883–84 season, the Uxbridge Crescents club had been growing significantly with games being played against senior teams in the area such as Southall, Hanwell, Burnham, Hounslow as well as Uxbridge F.C. themselves. On 14 August 1886, a letter to the editor of the Buckinghamshire Advertiser written on behalf of members of Uxbridge F.C. set out the reasons for a possible amalgamation with Uxbridge Crescents and proposed a committee of three members from each club to discuss the matter. Negotiations were carried out by committees of the two clubs. After membership approval, a joint General Meeting was held at Uxbridge Town Hall on 26 August 1886 to give notice of the amalgamation and to elect officers for the forthcoming season. A formal resolution was passed deciding that the name of the Uxbridge Crescents should be retained as an alteration of name would necessitate them relinquishing their claim to the 1885-86 West Middlesex Cup.

The amalgamation saw the club adopt red shirts which are still the colours worn today, and the nickname "The Reds" first used. The first game of the combined club took place on Mr. S. W. Light's Field against Maidenhead on 2 October 1886, ending in a 3–2 defeat. On 12 March 1887, the club reached the final of the 1886–87 season West Middlesex Cup competition facing Southall at their home ground, but were defeated 1–0. The 1886–87 season also saw a change of home ground for Uxbridge from Mr. S. W. Light's Field to the tenancy of Mr. Johnson's Field. At the club's AGM on 25 August 1887 it was unanimously decided for the club's name to be changed to the "Uxbridge Football Club".

Uxbridge reached the final of the West Middlesex Challenge Cup again in the 1887–88 season but lost 4–2 to Chiswick Park F.C., watched by 800 spectators at Yiewsley's ground in West Drayton on 11 February 1888. The first trophy won by the amalgamated team was the Henesey Challenge Cup on 16 March 1889 when they defeated Colnbrook 6–0 at Mr. Johnson's Field in front of 800-1000 spectators. (The Henesey Challenge Cup competition took place from the 1888–89 to the 1892–93 season. It was organized by Uxbridge F.C. and was open to clubs located within 10 miles of Uxbridge Market House.) The following Saturday, 23 March 1889, they defeated Colnbrook again; this time 1–0 in the final of the West Middlesex Cup at the Dolphin ground, Slough.

After returning to Mr. S.W. Light's Field for the 1889–90 season, the club moved to Colne Farm for the 1890–91 season, opening there with a 4–3 win against Slough on 27 September 1890. They would continue their success in the West Middlesex Cup with three consecutive titles in the 1890s. On 11 April 1891, they defeated Hounslow 3–2 at Southall. On 26 March 1892, they defeated Harrow Athletic 3–2 also at Southall and on 15 April 1893 they defeated Southall 3–0 at Yiewsley. On 19 April 1893, Uxbridge won the Henesey Challenge Cup for the second time, defeating the 2nd Scots Guards 2–1 at Colne Farm watched by over 1500 spectators.

Having been finalists in 1891 and 1893, Uxbridge won the Middlesex Senior Cup for the first time on 7 April 1894, defeating the 3rd Grenadier Guards 2–0 in the final in front of 4,000 spectators at Southall. In the 1894–95 season the club became founder members of Division Two of the Southern League and finished fourth in their first four seasons. They would win the Middlesex Senior Cup for the second time on 25 April 1896, when they defeated Southall 3–2 after a reply at Hanwell watched by close to 5,000 spectators. In the 1897–98 season, they reached the final of the FA Amateur Cup, losing to Middlesbrough 2–0 at Crystal Palace.

However, in the 1898–99 season, Uxbridge finish next to bottom of the league. Dwindling attendances resulted in the club facing financial difficulties. The club committee made the decision to withdraw from the Second Division of the Southern League and enter the new Middlesex Amateur League. At a special general meeting of members convened on 5 June 1899 to discuss the club's financial position the hon. treasurer Mr. C. Hutson advised that the club was in debt by £128. The chairman Mr. Edmund Stevens stated that there had been a significant increase in the number of strong clubs in the South of England and professionalism had come in which had robbed small country clubs of good players. At a vote the actions of the committee in withdrawing the club from the Southern League was unanimously endorsed. By the 1899–00 season the majority of the players who made up the team in the 1898–99 season had deserted the club. Uxbridge played their first game in the Middlesex League on 7 October 1899 away at West Hampstead who inflicted a 11–0 defeat. The club finished the season bottom of the Middlesex league. An invitation made to Hillingdon F.C. to amalgamate the two clubs was unanimously refused at a special general meeting of Hillingdon club members on 9 July 1900.

On 14 August 1900 Mr. A. H. Murray appeared before Uxbridge County Court as Uxbridge's Honorary Secretary (hon. sec.). He was being sued by a Mr. William Hancox for the sum of £6 18s for 'break hire' in connection with the Uxbridge Football Club. Mr. Murray stated the club was a few pounds in debt, which they hoped to pay, but were unable to do so at present. His Honour Judge Sir Alfred G. Marten Q.C. said that he did not see that Mr. Murray was liable, and he would adjourn the case until October, in order to enable the club to try and make some arrangement. On 21 August 1900 a special general meeting of Uxbridge club members took place at the Chequers Hotel in Uxbridge. It was stated by hon. treasurer Mr. C. Hutson that the club's debt had reached approximately £140 but with donations it now stood at £75 19s 10d. The Hon. Sec. Mr. A. H. Murray observed that judging from the number of members there that evening, it did not seem that members wished to carry on another year. With Uxbridge's Managing Committee seeing no way out of its financial difficulties chairman Mr. B. T. Gales very reluctantly moved that steps were taken to wind up the club. The club was wound up with a debt after further donations standing at £64.

=== Restart ===
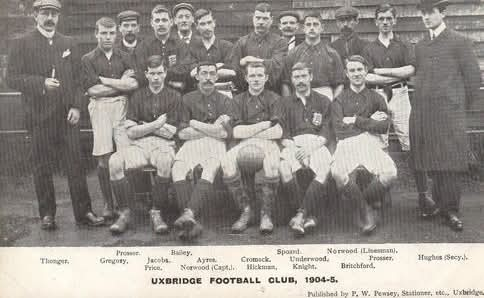
The Uxbridge Football Club team and supporting club members of the 1904–05 season

After much fund raising in the local community by 19 April 1902 Uxbridge's debt stood at £27. By this time each creditor had been paid 10s in the £. After a final push for donations the club was cleared of its debts. On 16 August 1902 a letter to the editor of the Middlesex & Buckinghamshire Advertiser written by Hon. Sec. A. H. Murray announced that the committee of the club 'having at last freed themselves from all the outstanding liabilities, have decided to make another attempt to run a football team for Uxbridge.' On 21 August 1902 a special general meeting was held at the George Hotel in Uxbridge to restart the club. The first game took place at Colne Farm on 13 September 1902 with a friendly against Yiewsley watched by 100 spectators which ended with a 5–2 win. Uxbridge joined the West Middlesex League and finished the 1902–3 season as runners-up to Hounslow. In the 1904–5 season, they moved grounds to Hillingdon House Park opening the season there on 3 September 1904 with a 7–1 win against Middlesex Wanderers. In this season, they joined the new Great Western Suburban League and remained there until The Great War. Their best league finish was as runners-up to Brentford Reserves in the 1910–11 season. During this time, Uxbridge won the Middlesex Charity Cup twice. On 18 April 1908, they won the trophy for the first time by defeating Shepherd's Bush 2–0 in a replay at Southall watched by 600-700 spectators. Having been finalists in the 1908–09 and 1910–11 seasons, they would win the competition again in the 1912–13 season defeating Hampstead Town 2–1 at Staines on 12 April 1913.

After the First World War, Uxbridge moved to the Cottage Ground in Cowley playing their first game there on 22 March 1919 against Yiewsley in front of 400 spectators. The club joined the Athenian League in the 1919–20 season as Uxbridge Town. However, they finished second from bottom and were relegated to the Great Western Suburban League. In the 1922–23 season, Uxbridge moved grounds to Lodge Farm, New Denham. Their first game at the ground was on 9 September 1922 against Windsor & Eton, winning 2–1. Uxbridge only played at Lodge Farm for one season. At their AGM on 4 July 1923, it was announced the club had secured the use of the RAF Uxbridge Stadium for the 1923–24 season. 1,200 spectators watched their opening game there on 1 September 1923 gaining a 4–1 win against Cowley F.C. The club returned to the Athenian League in the 1924–25 season. In the 1934–35 season, Uxbridge won the Middlesex Charity Cup for the third time by defeating Finchley 4–3 at Wealdstone on 11 May 1935. In the 1936–37 season, they failed to be re-elected to the Athenian League after finishing bottom of the league twice. The club then moved to Division One of the Spartan League as Uxbridge F.C. and finished top of the league. However, they were denied the championship, as it was discovered the club had played an ineligible player, so they finished third when six points were deducted. The club then joined the Premier Division of the London League in the 1938–39 season.

With the outbreak of the Second World War, Uxbridge joined the newly established Great Western Combination League in October 1939. By 1939, the club had played at nine home grounds since its establishment in 1871 and had been playing at the RAF Uxbridge stadium since 1923. With the coming of the war, the team had to play at other grounds while RAF Uxbridge conducted its historic role in the defence of the United Kingdom. For the 1939–40 season, Uxbridge accepted Yiewsley F.C.'s offer of a ground share at their Evelyn's Stadium in Colham Green. The 1940–41 season saw Uxbridge Council's Parks Committee provide the club with a ground at Park Road in Uxbridge. The club played their first game at Park Road on 2 November 1940 against Wycombe Redfords F.C. which ended in a 1–1 draw. However, vandalism and theft which took place at the club's facilities there in June 1941 made playing at the ground untenable, requiring Uxbridge to return to Evelyn's stadium for the 1941–42 season, although after January 1942, poor pitch conditions at Evelyn's restricted its use. In this season, the club won the Great Western Combination Subsidiary Cup, defeating league champions Oxford City over two legs. Having beaten City 1–0 at Oxford, Uxbridge won the 'home' tie 2–1 at Wycombe Wanderers ground on 30 May 1942. In the 1942–43 season, the club finished league runners-up to the Grenadier Guards. From the 1943–44 season, Uxbridge played with no official home ground with all 'home' games being played at opposition's grounds or played at neutral grounds.

=== Post-war years ===
After the Second World War, the club joined the London League Western Division in the 1945–46 season, finishing runners-up to Edgware Town. Uxbridge returned to the R.A.F. Uxbridge stadium after six years on 11 May 1946 with a 3–0 win in a friendly game against Twickenham. In the 1946–47 season, the club joined the Corinthian League, opening with a 2–1 defeat at home against Eastbourne on 31 August 1946. However, issues with the lease of their home ground had arisen. At the club's annual meeting on 23 July 1947, President of the club Mr W.S.Try reported that owing to preparations for the 1948 Olympic Games, the RAF stadium would not be always available in the future and next season they would have to pay an increased price for each match there. A new home for Uxbridge was needed and on 17 September 1947 a large house called "Honeycroft" with 4.5 acres of land in Cleveland Road, Cowley was bought at auction on behalf of the club for £5,800 by Mr Try. The new ground was named after the house, which became the club's main facility. The first home game at Honeycroft was against Yiewsley in the F.A Cup on 4 September 1948 which was watched by 2,000-3,000 spectators and resulted in a 1–1 draw after extra time. After defeating Yiewsley 3–0 in a second reply and Wycombe Wanderers 4–3 in the next round, 3,700 spectators at Honeycroft would watch Uxbridge defeat Southall 1–0 in the F.A. Cup first qualifying round on 2 October 1948. Uxbridge would end their first season at Honeycroft as Corinthian League 1948–49 runners-up to Walton & Hersham.

In the 1950–51 season, Uxbridge won two trophies in consecutive weekends. On 5 May 1951, they defeated Maidenhead 2–0 at Maidstone to win the Corinthian Memorial Shield. A week later, on 12 May 1951, they won the Middlesex Senior Cup for the first time since 1896. Having been finalists previously in 1914, 1927, and 1935, they defeated Hayes 2–1 at Southall. Uxbridge would be finalists in the Corinthian Memorial Shield competition on two further occasions. On 25 April 1953, they won the shield for a second time by defeating Hounslow 3–2 at Slough. However, in the 1954–55 season, replayed final at Honeycroft on 27 August 1955 they were defeated 2–0 by Yiewsley. In the 1959–60 season, Uxbridge won their only league title to date when they became champions of the Corinthian League. The club remained in the Corinthian league, until the end of the 1962–63 season, when as a result of a restructuring of non-league football the league was disbanded, and were placed in Division one of the Athenian League. At the end of the 1966–67 season, the club was relegated to Division Two, which led to the club facing financial difficulties again. The club was reduced to only holding a one-third share of their Cleveland Road ground and were again required to start looking for a new home. There was hope that a new ground would be built at Hillingdon House Farm with the support of Hillingdon Council but deteriorating economic conditions meant the plans were shelved.

Uxbridge gained national prominence in 1976 when they met the England side on two occasions as part of the national team's warm-up to their World Cup qualifying games against Finland that year. On 10 June 1976 Uxbridge lost 6–0 to England in a 60-minute game at Barnet in preparation for the away game in Helsinki on 13 June 1976. On 10 October 1976 Uxbridge played a full-strength England team at Wembley Stadium to aid the team's readiness for the home game against the Finns on 13 October 1976. The score: England 8 Uxbridge 0. The games had been arranged by former Uxbridge secretary Alan Odell who was the FA's International Secretary and England Manager Don Revie's personal assistant. The 1976–77 season would be Uxbridge's last in the second division of the Athenian League as a consequence of the league contracting from two divisions to one at the start of the 1977–78 season

In the summer of 1978, the club left Cleveland Road and moved to its current ground in Horton Road, Yiewsley, also calling the new ground "Honeycroft". The 7.8 acre freehold site was bought at a cost of over £120,000. This was funded by the sale of the club's share in the company that owned the Cleveland Road ground. The first game at Horton Road took place on 26 August 1978 against Marlow resulting in a 2–1 win. The club spent over £170,000 on ground improvements and a 1–1 draw with an Arsenal XI on 12 November 1981 saw the official opening of the ground's first floodlights. The 1981–82 season saw the club finish third in the Athenian League and achieve election into the Isthmian League after second placed Edgware were adjudged to have inadequate facilities. In this season Uxbridge won the Middlesex Charity Cup for the first time in 47 years with a 2–1 win against Hendon at Honeycroft on 11 May 1982. However there was defeat to Banstead Athletic in the replayed final of the Athenian League Cup held on 19 May 1982 at Leyton-Wingate's ground. In the 1984–85 season, the club finished second in the Isthmian League Division Two South and gained promotion to Division One. The first season in Division One saw the team finishing in 7th place and reaching the 1st Round proper of the FA Trophy. They were also finalists in the Isthmian League Cup on 5 May 1986 losing 3–1 to Premier League Champions Sutton United watched by 1,052 spectators at Imber Court. Throughout this period of the late 1960s to late 1980s, the club was managed by Ron Clack. He was followed by Peter Marshall for one season and Michael Harvey for three seasons.

=== Recent history ===
June 1992 saw George Talbot take to the helm as manager. He had joined Uxbridge as coach in August 1991 after being manager at Harefield . His first success in his 14-year tenure was winning the London Challenge Cup in 1994, when, after despatching Southall, Leyton Orient (at Brisbane Road) and Football Conference sides Dagenham & Redbridge and Welling United, the club collected their first major trophy for 12 years. Three years later the London Challenge Cup was lifted again following victories over Collier Row & Romford, St. Albans City, Barking and Leyton Pennant by 1–0 in a final replay after a 3–3 draw at Fulham's Craven Cottage ground. A year later, in 1998, the club reached the London Challenge Cup Final again and also the final of the Middlesex Senior Cup, losing to Boreham Wood and Enfield respectively.

1999 saw another appearance in the final of the London Challenge Cup, this time, the club losing to Dulwich Hamlet after extra time at Charlton Athletic's ground, and a year later the club made their fourth consecutive appearance in the London Challenge Cup Final, and this time the "Reds" gained their revenge over Dulwich Hamlet, with a 5–4 win on penalties following a 2–2 draw at Dagenham & Redbridge. 2001 saw the club lose their stranglehold on the London Challenge Cup but they were victorious in the Middlesex Senior Cup for the first time in 50 years as they defeated Isthmian Premier neighbours Harrow Borough 3–0 at Honeycroft.

Uxbridge remained in the Isthmian League Division One until the 2002–03 season when the division was split and the club was allocated to Division One North. In the 2003–04 season, the club reached the final of the Middlesex Senior Cup again. They met holders Hendon on 8 May 2004 at Yeading F.C.'s ground but were defeated 3–1 after extra time. In the 2004–05 season, the club moved from the Isthmian league to the Southern league, in the Eastern Division. Their debut in the new league saw them finish in fourth place and a play-off competition for the final promotion place, which Uxbridge lost in the final on penalties at Maldon Town. Before the 2005–06 season, the club installed a new floodlighting system (up to Football Conference standard). However, a lower than expected 14th position in the league that season resulted in the departure of George Talbot.

Former Uxbridge player and Northwood manager Tony Choules was appointed as George Talbot's successor for the 2006–07 season. Under his stewardship, the club reached the Southern League Division One South & West Play-off final in the 2007–08 season, where they lost to Oxford City 1–0. The club switched to Division One Central in the Southern League at the start of the 2010–11 season. There was success in cup competition with the club winning back to back Middlesex Charity Cup's in 2013 and 2014. In the 2018–2019 season, the club joined the Isthmian League Division One South Central.

After thirteen years in charge of the club, Choules stepped aside in May 2019 after winning the Middlesex Charity Cup that season. His replacement was former Chalfont St Peter boss Danny Edwards. He continued the club's success in the Middlesex Charity Cup in the 2021–22 season with a 2–0 victory over Hanwell Town and the trophy was won for the ninth time in the 2023–24 season when North Greenford United were defeated 2–1 in the final at Bedfont.

In the 2024–25 season, Uxbridge finished second in the Isthmian League South Central Division and were promoted to reach step 3 of the football pyramid for the first time in their history after defeating Hanworth Villa 2–1 in the play-off final at Honeycroft on 4 May 2025.

In the 2025–26 season Uxbridge played in Southern League Premier South Division and ended the season in ninth place. The Middlesex Charity Cup was won for the tenth time with a 4–2 victory over Broadfields United at Bedfont on 7 May 2026.

=== League history 1894–95 to 1945–46 ===
Season	League	Division
1894–95 to 1897–98	Southern League	Division 2
1898–99	Southern League	Division 2 London
1899–00	Middlesex League	
1900–01 to 1901–02	Club dissolved due to debt	
1902–03	West Middlesex League	
1903–04	No league membership	
1904–05 to 1913–14	Great Western Suburban League	
1914–15 to 1918–19	First World War	
1919–20*	Athenian League	
1920–21 to 1923–24*	Great Western Suburban League	
1924–25 to 1936–37*	Athenian League	
1937–38	Spartan League	Division 1
1938–39	London League	Premier Division
1939–40 to 1944–45	Great Western Combination League	
1945–46	London League	Western Division
* As Uxbridge Town		

For the 1946–47 season onwards, see Uxbridge at the Football Club History Database

== Ground ==
Uxbridge play their games at Honeycroft, Horton Road, Yiewsley. It has a capacity of 3,770 with 353 seats. The ground used to be the sports and social club of the Drayton Controls company (Drayreg). Uxbridge named the ground "Honeycroft" after their former home in Cowley. It has been designated as a 'C' Grade stadium. In 2023, Honeycroft underwent an extensive redevelopment including the installation of a 3G pitch.

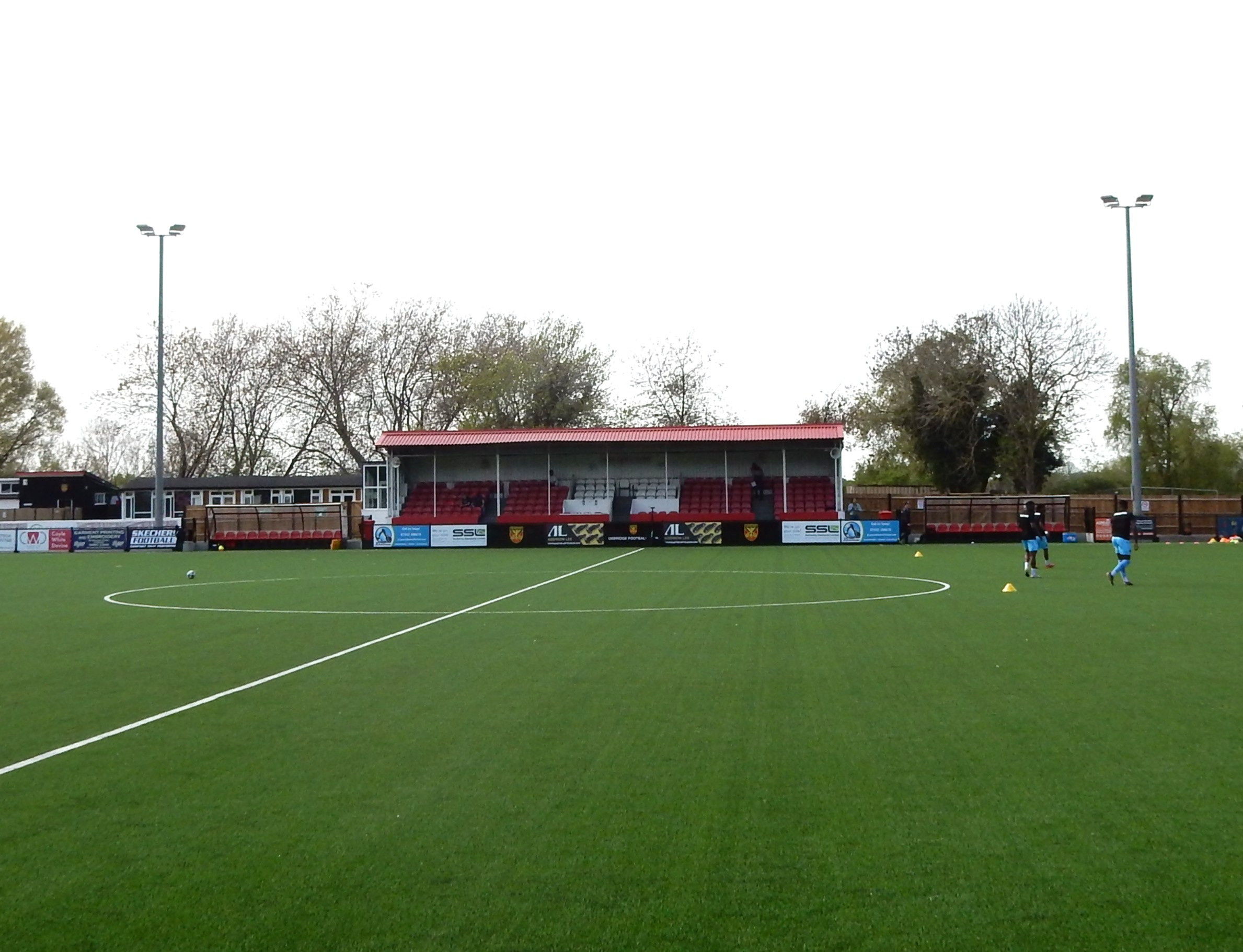

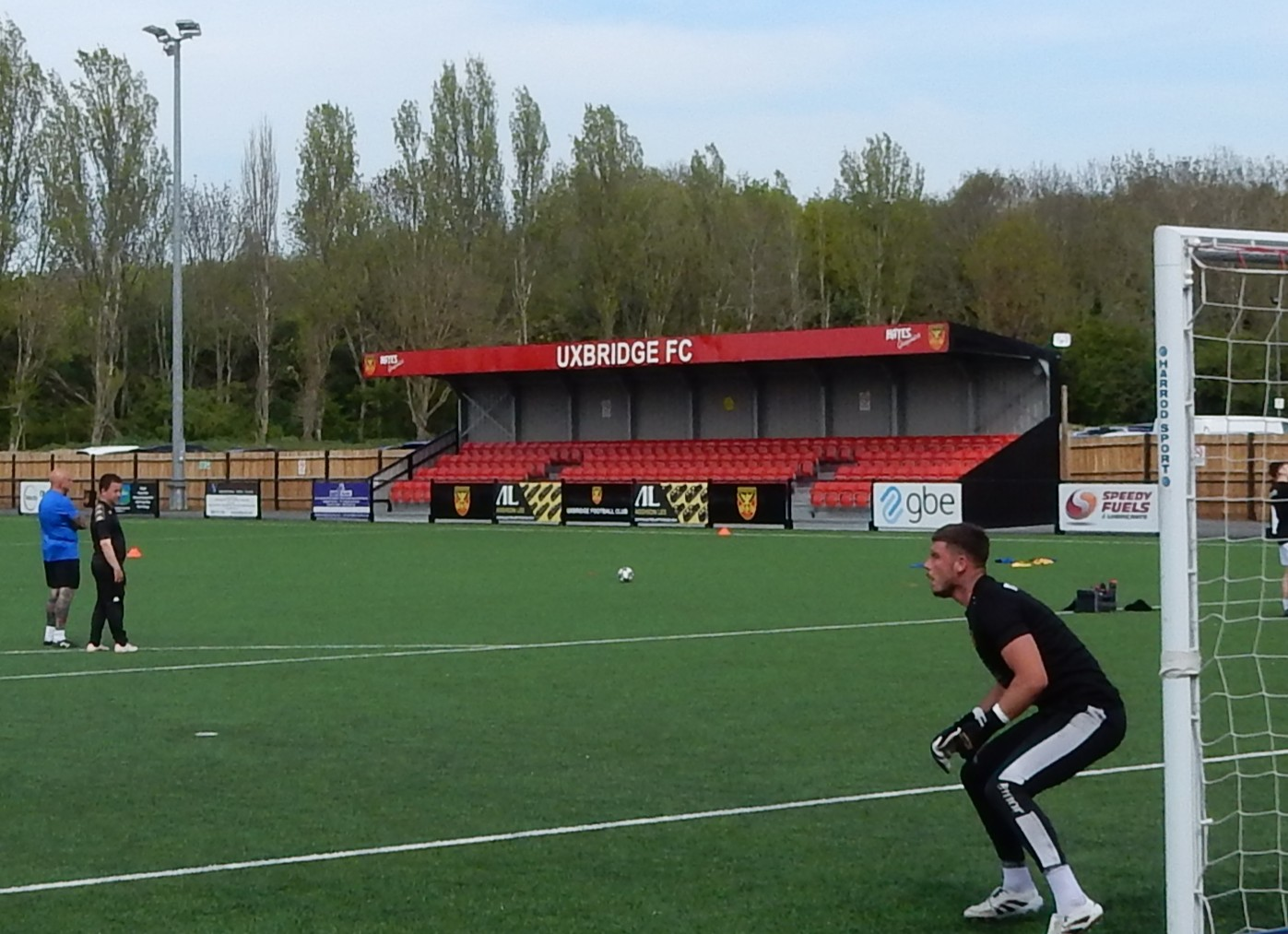

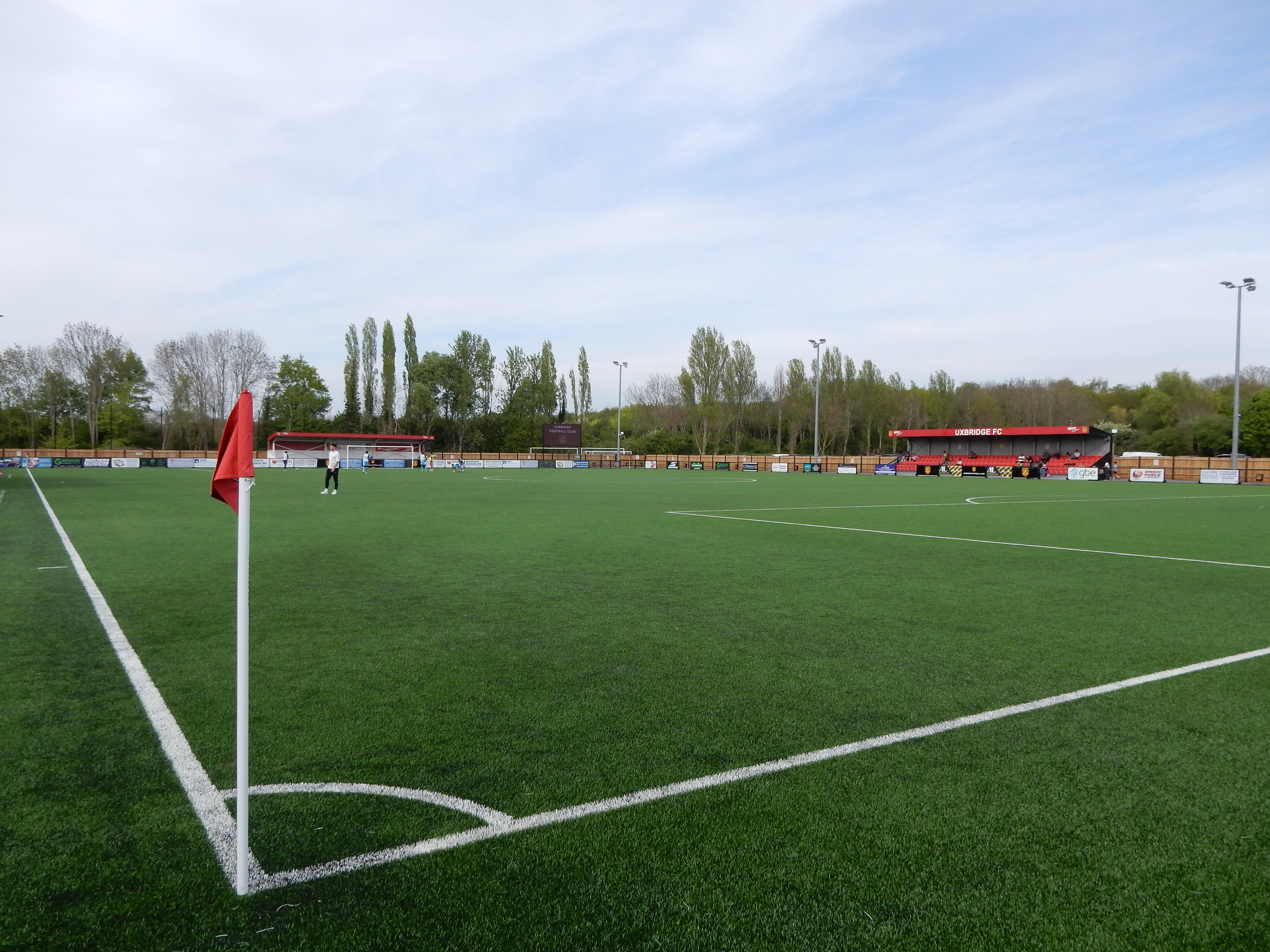

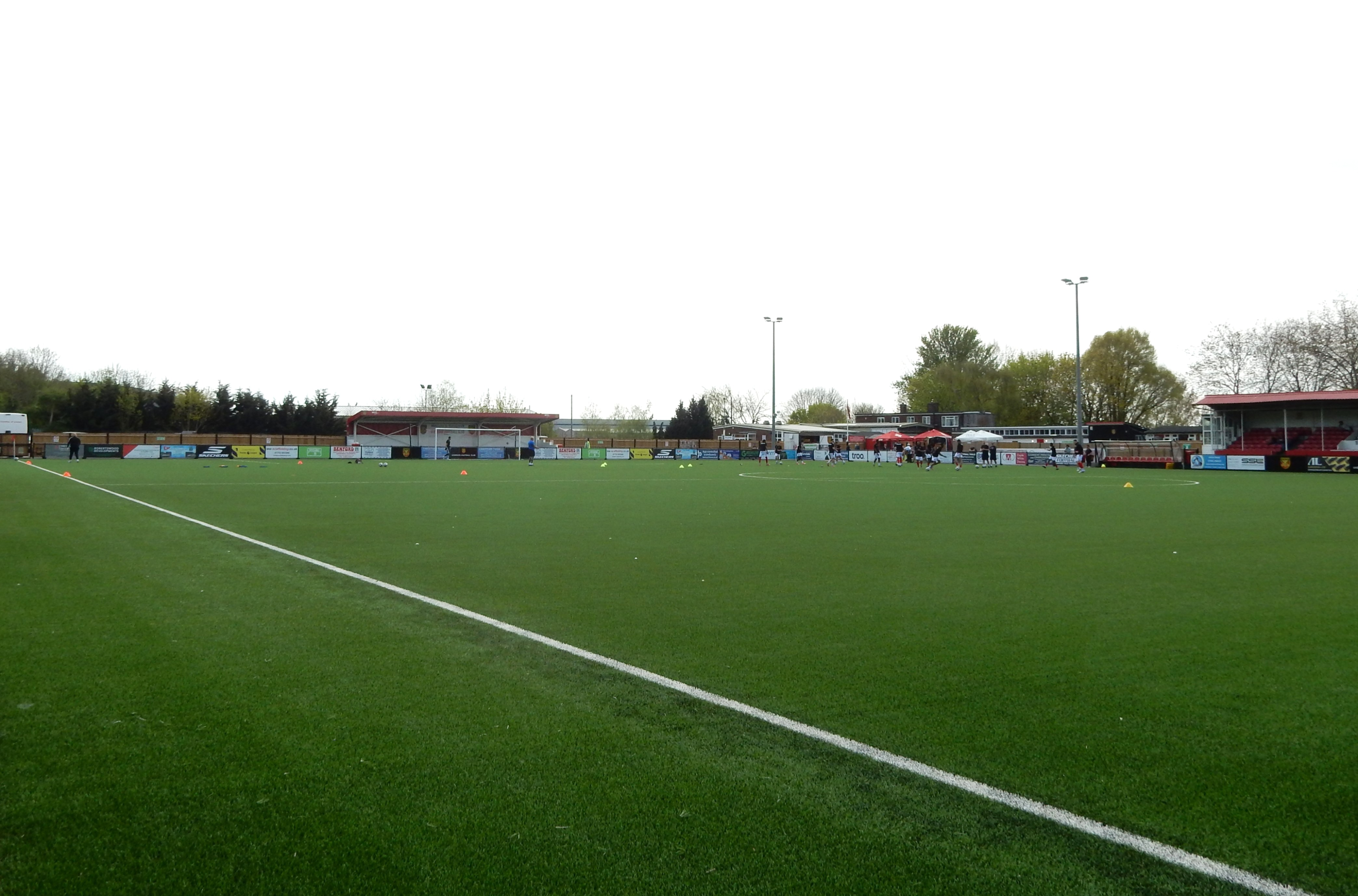

=== Ground history ===
1871–72 to 1873–74 - Uxbridge F.C. play home games on Uxbridge Common.

1874–75 - Uxbridge F.C.'s only home game of the 1874–75 season before being dissolved on the 18 November 1874 is played on the Uxbridge Cricket Club ground against Harrow Chequers on 10 October 1874.

1874–75 to 1878–79 - Uxbridge Crescents play home games on Uxbridge Common.

1879–80 to 1883–84 - Uxbridge Crescents and the reformed Uxbridge F.C. club play home games on Uxbridge Common.

1884–85 to 1885–86 - Mr Light's Meadow/Field and Uxbridge Common. Uxbridge F.C. play home games at Mr S. W. Light's Field. The ground is thought to be close to where the Rockingham Recreation Ground is today as reference is made to the 'Waterworks end'. Uxbridge Water Works stood where the Rushes Mead cul-de-sac is today, on the north-west side of the park. Uxbridge Crescents continue to play on Uxbridge Common but from 1885 some games are played at Mr. Light's Field.

1886–87 - The amalgamated team is called Uxbridge Crescents for one season. On 2 and 9 October 1886, home games are recorded as being played at Mr. S. W. Light's Field. At the club's AGM on 25 August 1887 reference is made to the club having had the tenancy of Mr. Johnson's Field in the 1886–87 season.

1887–88 to 1888–89 - Tenancy of Mr. Johnson's Field. Reference is made to the 'Gas Works goal'. Uxbridge Gas Works was situated off Cowley Mill Road, where the Uxbridge Royal Mail sorting office and Uxbridge Trade Park is today. The 1887–88 ground rental of £5 is doubled to £10 for the 1888–89 season.

1889–90 - 'Uxbridge Football Club ground' - reference made to the 'Waterworks goal.' This would indicate a return to Mr. S. W. Light's Field for one season.

1890–91 to 1899–1900 - Colne Farm ground, Uxbridge Moor The Colne Farm ground was renowned for its heavy soil. It was situated between two arms of the River Colne, next to Upper Colham Mill. Today this is the location of the Riverside Way Industrial Estate.

1900–01 to 1901–02 - Club dissolved due to debt.

1902–03 to 1903–04 - Colne Farm ground, Uxbridge Moor.

1904–05 to 1914–15 - Hillingdon House Park ground.

1915–16 to 1917–18 - First World War.

1918–19 to 1921–22 - The Cottage ground (Mr. H. Richardson's Meadow), Cowley Road, Cowley.

1922–23 - Lodge Farm ground, Denham (now Oxford) Road, New Denham.

1923–24 to 1938–39 - RAF Uxbridge Central Sports Ground.

1939–40 - Yiewsley F.C.'s Evelyns Stadium, Colham Green.

1940–41 - Park Road ground, Uxbridge.

1941–42 - Yiewsley F.C.'s Evelyn's Stadium, Colham Green. On 31 January 1942, in the game against the R.A.F (N.W.), Evelyn's pitch is described as a mud quagmire. The game against Oxford City on 6 February 1942 was cancelled with the Evelyn's pitch deemed unfit to play. Later games are mostly played at away or neutral grounds.

1942–43 - Six games played at Evelyn's Stadium. Other ‘home’ games played at Southall's Western Road ground and Hounslow's Denbigh Road ground or played at opposition's ground.

1943–44 to 1945–46 - No home ground - All competitive 'home' games played at opposition's grounds or played at neutral grounds e.g., Windsor and Eton's Stag Meadow ground. Friendly games against Hounslow and an Army XI played at Rockingham Recreation ground.

1946–47 to 1947–48 - RAF Uxbridge Central Sports Ground.

1948–49 to 1977–78 - Honeycroft, Cleveland Road, Cowley. After Uxbridge left the ground in 1978, the site was developed into a housing estate consisting of dwellings on Ratcliffe Close, Sargeant Close and Cleveland Road.

1978–79 to Present - Honeycroft, Horton Road, Yiewsley.

== Club committee ==
Position	Staff
President	Derek Marshall
Chairman / Treasurer	Mark Bantock
Vice Chairman	Steve Kennedy
Secretary	Colin Finch
Commercial Manager	Chris Stanborough
Safeguarding Manager / Club Operations	Lorraine Kennedy
Club Historian / Fans Liaison	Michael Bodman
Matchday Staff	Michael Burrell
Media Manager	Rachel Sharp
Website Manager / Programme Editor	Richard Russell

Last updated: 29 August 2026.
Source: https://www.uxbridgefc.com/programmes-26-27

== Team management ==
Position	Staff
Manager	Danny Edwards
Assistant Manager	Sean Kelleher
1st Team Coach	John Carroll
1st Team Coach	Fred Cummings
1st Team Player/Coach	Alan Massey
1st Team Goalkeeping Coach	Shaka Mughal
1st Team Head of Medical / Physiotherapist	Shannon O’Mahony
1st Team Head of Performance	Amie-Jane Crampton
Logistics Manager	Colin Finch
Videographer	Ki Turner

Last updated: 13 September 2026.
Source: https://www.uxbridgefc.com/programmes-26-27

== Current squad ==
As of 31 October 2026

Note: Flags indicate national team as defined under FIFA eligibility rules; some limited exceptions apply. Players may hold more than one non-FIFA nationality.

Pos.	Nation	Player
GK	ENG	Kacper Orlowski
GK	ENG	Gio Clarke
GK	ENG	Sam Morris
DF	ENG	Josh Gidaree (on loan from Wycombe Wanderers)
DF	ENG	Olumide Akinode
DF	ENG	Jack Burchall
DF	ENG	Charlie Stallard
DF	ENG	Ciaran Martin
DF	ENG	Alan Massey
DF	ENG	Calum Duffy
MF	ENG	Elijah Anthony
MF	ENG	Cole Brown
MF	ENG	Eddie Allsop
MF	ENG	Brian Nelson
MF	ENG	Owen James

Pos.	Nation	Player
MF	ENG	Liam Prior-Tack
MF	ENG	Ollie McCoy
MF	ENG	Sam Deadfield (captain)
MF	ENG	Troy Perez-Duah
MF	ENG	Massimo Giamattei
MF	FRA	Luis Le Palh
MF	IRL	Toby Nnadozie
MF	ENG	Gabe George
FW	ENG	Trevan Robinson
FW	ENG	George Moore
FW	ENG	Francis Amartey
FW	ENG	Joseph Lawal
FW	ENG	Jake Coomes
FW	ENG	Micah Anthony
FW	ENG	George Winser

== Honours ==
=== League honours ===
- Isthmian League South Central :
  - Runners-up and Promotion Play Off Winners: 2024–25
- Isthmian League Division Two South :
  - Runners-up: 1984–85
- Corinthian League:
  - Champions: 1959–60
  - Runners-up: 1948–49
- London League (Western Division):
  - Runners-up: 1945–46
- Great Western Combination League:
  - Runners-up: 1942–43
- Great Western Suburban League:
  - Runners-up: 1910–11
- West Middlesex League:
  - Runners-up: 1902–03

=== Cup honours ===
- F.A. Amateur Cup:
  - Runners-up (1): 1897–98
- Middlesex Senior Cup:
  - Winners (4): 1893–94, 1895–96, 1950–51, 2000–01
  - Runners-up (8): 1890–91, 1892–93, 1913–14, 1926–27, 1934–35, 1954–55, 1997–98, 2003–04
- London Challenge Cup:
  - Winners (3): 1993–94, 1996–97, 1999–2000
  - Runners-up (2): 1997–98, 1998–99
- Middlesex Charity Cup:
  - Winners (10): 1907–08, 1912–13, 1934–35, 1981–82, 2012–13, 2013–14, 2018–19, 2021–22, 2023–24, 2025–26
  - Runners-up (9): 1908–09, 1910–11, 1913–14, 1924–25, 1969–70, 1976–77, 1982–83, 1985–86, 2009–10
- Corinthian League Memorial Shield:
  - Winners (2): 1950–51, 1952–53
  - Runners-up (1): 1954–55
- Isthmian League (AC Delco) Cup:
  - Runners-up (1): 1985–86
- Athenian League Cup:
  - Runners-up (1): 1981–82
- Middlesex George Ruffell Memorial Shield:
  - Runners-up (1): 2000–01
- Great Western Combination Subsidiary Cup:
  - Winners (1): 1941–42
- West Middlesex Challenge Cup:
  - Winners (5): 1885–86 (Ux.Cres.), 1888–89, 1890–91, 1891–92, 1892–93
  - Runners-up (2): 1886–87, 1887–88
- Henesey Challenge Cup :
  - Winners (2): 1888–89, 1892–93

== Records ==
- Best league performance: 9th in Southern League Premier South, 2025–26.
- Best FA Cup performance: Second round, 1873–74.
- Best FA Amateur Cup performance: Final, 1897–98.
- Best FA Trophy performance: Third round, 2021–22, 2022–23, 2026–27.
- Best FA Vase performance: Fourth round, 1983–84.
- Record attendances:
  - Honeycroft Cowley: 3,700 vs Southall, F.A. Cup first qualifying round, 2 October 1948.
  - Honeycroft Yiewsley: 1535 vs Hanworth Villa, Isthmian League South Central 2024–25 play-off final, 4 May 2025.
  - Colne Farm: 1,500 vs 2nd Scots Guards, Henesey Challenge Cup Final Tie, 19 April 1893.
- Most appearances: Roger Nicholls, 1,054
- Most goals: Phil Duff, 153
