= Old Cranleighans F.C. =

Old Cranleighans
- Full name: Old Cranleighans Football Club
- Founded: 1886 (revived 2023)
- Dissolved: 1919
- Ground: Catford Bridge
Original colours

Old Cranleighans F.C. is an amateur association football club, based in London, for the former pupils of Cranleigh School.

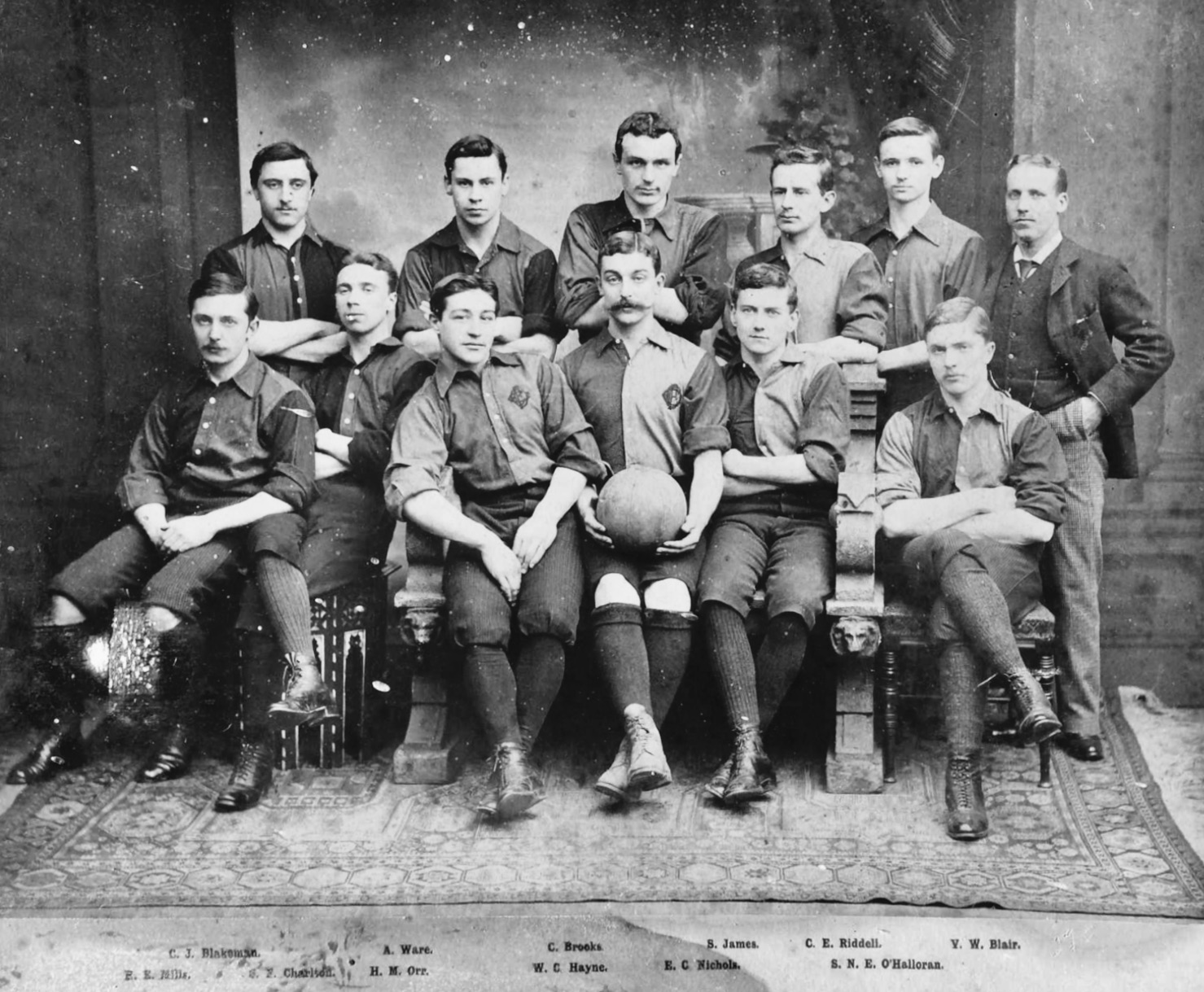
Old Cranleighans Football Club, 1887–88

== History ==
The football club was founded in 1886, by former pupil Henry Casswell, who had founded the original Old Cranleighan sporting club in 1882.

The club entered the FA Cup qualifying rounds twice, in 1891–92 and 1892–93, but lost in the first round both times - despite being at home to Gravesend in the former year, the majority of the (small) crowd had come with the visitors. It was a regular entrant of the FA Amateur Cup and the Arthur Dunn Cup, reaching the semi-final of the latter in 1911–12.

The club also undertook a tour of France in 1909, its results including a win over US Boulogne.

The school switched to rugby union during the First World War, which meant that, at the end of the war, there were not sufficient association footballers of the right quality to re-form the football club, many joining the Old Cranleighan rugby club instead.

=== Revival ===
The club was revived in 2023, its first match being a 2–1 win over a revival of Barnes F.C. in December.

== Colours ==
The club's colours were dark blue and orange.

== Ground ==
The club played at Catford Bridge in south London.
