= Gateshead N.E.R. F.C. =

Gateshead N.E.R.
- Full name: Gateshead North Eastern Railway Works F.C.
- Nickname(s): the Railwaymen
- Founded: 1888
- Dissolved: 1903
- Ground: Park Lane
Home colours

Gateshead N.E.R. F.C. was an English association club based in Gateshead, then in County Durham.

== History ==
The club was founded in 1888 as a works side of the North Eastern Railway. It was a founder member of the Northern Football Alliance, in which it played until resigning in 1903.

It was a regular entrant to the FA Cup qualifying rounds until 1902–03, but never reached the first round proper. It reached the third qualifying round in 1891–92, thanks to its two biggest Cup wins, 7–2 over Ashington and 10–4 at Whitburn; the Whitburn result was all the more remarkable as the match finished 4–4 after 90 minutes, and Gateshead scored six times in the optional 30 minutes extra-time. The Railwaymen took the lead at Bishop Auckland in the third round, but went down 3–1.

Although in May 1903 the club was involved in setting up a revived Tyneside Alliance league, the club was wound up the following month.

== Colours ==
The club originally played in black and white, changed to black and red by 1894, and to red and white by 1902.

== Ground ==
The club's ground was at Park Lane, and it originally used the Ellison Arms for facilities.
