= 93rd Highland Regiment F.C. =

Former association football club in Scotland

93rd Highland Regiment
- Full name: 93rd Highland Regiment Football Club
- Nicknames: the Highlanders, the Kilties
- Founded: 1872
- Dissolved: 2005?
- Ground: varied according to stationing
Home colours

93rd Highland Regiment F.C. was a British football club, formed from the 93rd Sutherland Highlanders Regiment of Foot. The club played at a senior level in England, Scotland, and India, depending on where it was stationed; it is the only club to have played in both the FA Cup and the Highland Football League, doing so 20 years apart.

== History ==
=== English football ===
The regiment had been playing a form of football as early as 1851, but as an organised club, it was founded in 1872; originally as a rugby football club, when the regiment was called the 93rd Sutherland Highlanders, and its home ground depended on where the regiment was based. The club's first success came by winning the first Army Cup in 1888–89, beating the South Staffordshire Regiment side 2–0 in the final at the Kennington Oval, Fleming scoring both goals in the second half. The victory was assisted by the Staffs' goalkeeper Jinks being ordered from the field for rough play. By this time the media occasionally referred to the club by its more formal title of the 2nd Argyll and Sutherland Highlanders (93rd Foot).

Its best achievement in football came in 1890–91, when the regiment was based in Aldershot and entered the FA Cup. The club won through the qualifying rounds - beating four future Football League clubs (Luton Town, Watford, Swindon Town, and Ipswich Town) - to reach the first round proper, or the last 32. Drawn away to Sunderland Albion the regiment narrowly lost 2–0, in front of a crowd of 2,000. The Highlanders had been accompanied to the match by the regimental pipers and the two teams dined together after the match at the Empress Hotel in Sunderland. Goalkeeper Robertson - a replacement for the injured Urquhart - impressed the home side so much that he signed for Albion for 1891–92. The club also reached the Army Cup Final again, and was favoured to beat the 2nd Scots Guards; however the Guards won 2–0, before a crowd of 6,000 at the Kennington Oval, despite the 93rd dominating the game - "had goalkeepers been changed there is little doubt the winners would have been badly beaten, so great a disparity was there in the actual play between the two teams".

However, the Highlanders were unable to follow up their exploits the following season, as the regiment was sent to India in October 1891.

=== Scottish football ===
The club continued football in India, but now calling itself after the "new" regiment title, the 1st Argyll and Sutherland Highlanders; it lost 3–1 in the final of the Indian army tournament to the King's Own Scottish Borderers. A club from the 1st Argyll and Bute Artillery Volunteers, a company in the Volunteer movement based in Dunoon, was also in existence by now.

In 1893, the regiment returned to Edinburgh, and the football side entered the Scottish football system. It was a member of the Scottish Football Association in 1893–94, 1897–98, and from 1909–10 to 1911–12. It entered the Scottish Cup and Scottish Qualifying Cup in those seasons, plus the relevant regional competition; the East of Scotland Shield in 1892–93 and 1893–94, and the Stirlingshire Cup from 1908 to 1912.

Football had moved on enough to make the club uncompetitive against non-army sides; it lost every one of its Qualifying Cup ties, and it only won once each in the regional competitions. Its only win in the East of Scotland Cup was a 6–1 victory over Portobello of Edinburgh in the first round in September 1893, but, in the 1908–09 Stirlingshire Cup, it caused a major shock in beating King's Park 3–0, despite missing a penalty.

=== Local leagues ===
Between 1912 and 1914, when the battalion was based in Fort George, the club played in the Highland League, finishing 7th in 1912–13 and 8th in 1913–14, both times out of nine clubs. When stationed in Edinburgh in 1930, the club had an unexpected further opportunity in a league, as the Cameron Highlanders were re-assigned after playing four games in the Edinburgh & District League, and the Argylls were invited to take over the fixture list; however it lost all seven of its matches, and, self-admittedly overmatched, did not take part again.

== Colours ==
The club wore the following colours:

- 1870s: blue jerseys with a yellow St Andrew's cross on the left breast.
- 1893–95: black and yellow
- 1897–98: scarlet jerseys with yellow collar
- 1909–10: dark blue shirts with white collar, and shield bearing the letters "D. A. and S. H." (the D standing for depot)
- 1910–12: dark green shirts with white collar

== Ground ==
The club's ground was dependent on where the company was stationed. Its locations as a senior club were:

- 1872–73: Aldershot
- 1873–74: Woolwich
- 1890–91: Aldershot
- 1891–93: Simla
- 1893–95: Edinburgh
- 1897–98: Maryhill Barracks, Glasgow
- 1909–12: Stirling Castle
- 1912–14: Fort George

== Records ==
FA Cup:

- Best FA Cup performance: 1st round – 1890–91

Army FA Challenge Cup:

- Winners: 1888–89, 1897–98
- Runners-up: 1890–91

== Notable players ==
On 10 October 1891, Southampton St. Mary's played an exhibition match against the Regiment at the County Ground, Southampton which the Regiment won 2–0. The St. Mary's management were so impressed by Jock Fleming and Sandy McMillan that they immediately signed them both in order that they might play in the Saints' forthcoming FA Cup match with Reading.
