= Port Clarence F.C. =

Association football club from the 1880s and 1890s

Port Clarence
- Full name: Port Clarence Football Club
- Nicknames: Port, the Clarencites, the Saltworkers
- Founded: 1881
- Dissolved: 1894
- Ground: Haverton Hill
- Secretary: Peter Huntington
colours

Port Clarence Football Club was a 19th century association football club from Port Clarence, near Middlesbrough, then in Yorkshire.

== History ==
The first reference to the club is of it playing in the Durham Senior Cup in January 1882, beating the Friends club 7–0. Its earliest performance of note was reaching the Cleveland Charity Cup final in 1887–88; it lost to Middlesbrough in the final, at the latter's Linthorpe Road ground, but, as the pitch was under water in some parts, the game was re-played at the same venue two weeks later, Middlesbrough again winning.

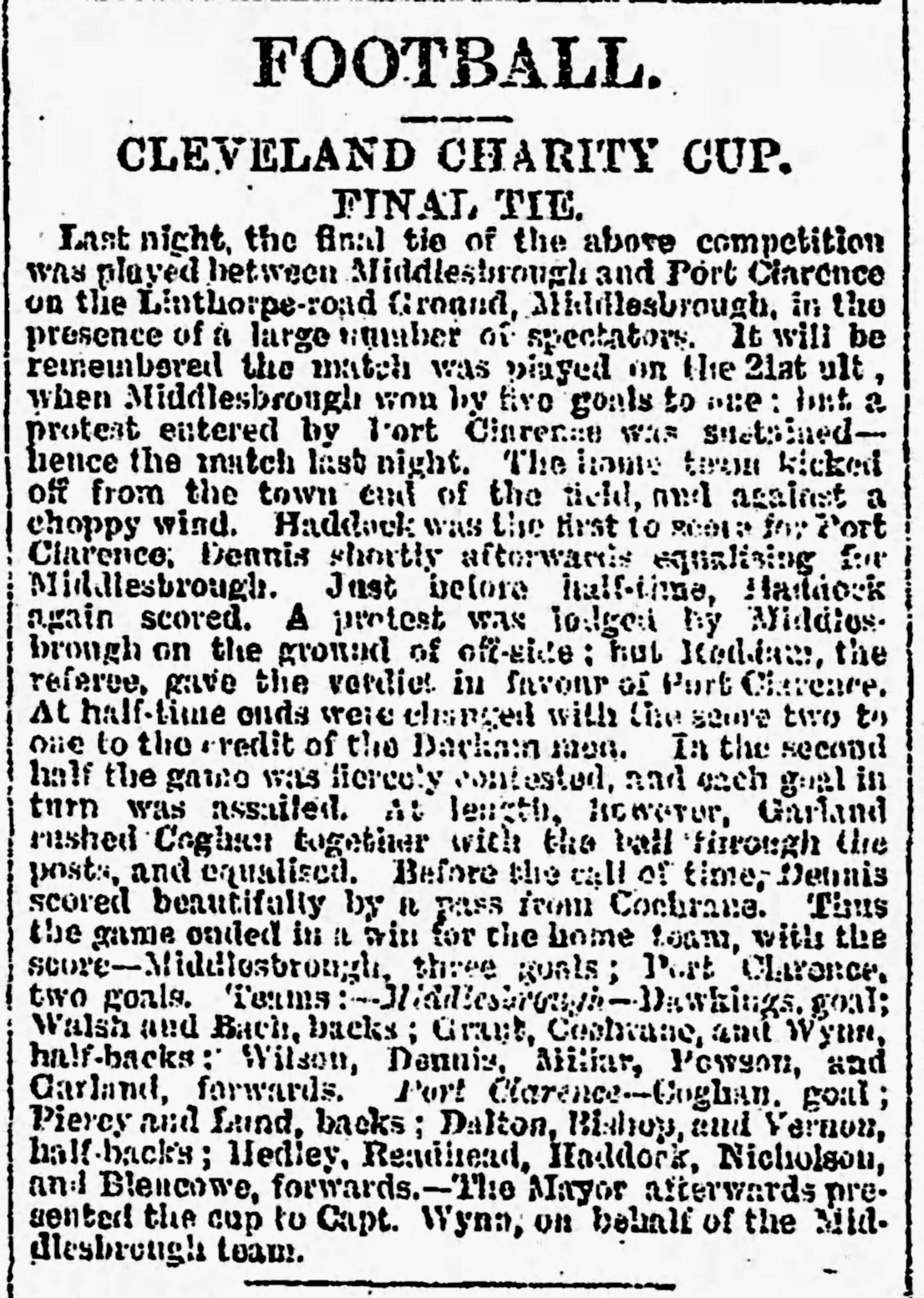
1887–88 Cleveland Charity Cup final, Middlesbrough 3–2 Port Clarence, Northern Echo, 3 May 1888

The club lost 3–0 in the semi-final of the Cleveland Cup in 1886–87 to Darlington St Augustines, and 5–0 at the same stage in 1887–88 at home to Middlesbrough. In the latter season, the Clarenceites lost in the fourth round of the Durham Senior Cup to Darlington, but in confusing and controversial circumstances; a snowstorm rendered the original tie unplayable, but the Cleveland FA tried to bar the Port Clarence side from attending the replay, which Darlington won 5–1. Port protested that the replay was in worse conditions (the pitch was covered in snow with depths of up to ten inches, and the touchlines were invisible) but the protest was dismissed. In consequence the Port secretary, Peter Huntington, resigned from the Durham FA committee. The outcome was considered an injustice, with even Charles W. Alcock supporting Clarence on the issue.

The club reached the semi-final of the Cleveland Cup again in 1888–89, but the Durham F.A. arranged the tie with Birtley at Sunderland A.F.C.'s Newcastle Road ground on 9 March, when Port had a long-arranged fixture with Newcastle East End; faced with expulsion from the competition, Port turned up to Newcastle Road with a second XI, but found that Sunderland was hosting a friendly instead. Secretary Huntington took the opportunity to act as referee. The Durham F.A. announced that it had allowed Sunderland to host a friendly as Port had given notice of scratching from the competition but had sent a late telegram suggesting the tie would go ahead without formal notice from the Clarencites. Huntingdon appealed to the Football Association, which sympathized, but could not interfere as the Durham F.A.'s action did not amount to misconduct.

The club had also entered the 1888–89 FA Cup qualifying rounds, its first bow in the national competition, but lost 3–1 to East End in the first round. It entered the competition until 1892–93, but its only win came in the first qualifying round in 1890–91, 4–1 over Whitby, at home in front of a crowd of 4–500. In the second round it lost at South Bank; the club had the consolation of reaching the Cleveland Cup final that season - albeit now restricted only to amateur sides - but going down 2–0 to Middlesbrough Swifts (the Middlesbrough nursery side) at Stockton.

The club was a founder member of the North East Counties League in 1889–90, but the league petered out before completion, with the club in fourth place (out of ten clubs) in April, but having games in hand on every other club, winning 7 out of 11 matches. In 1891, Port was a founder member of a less geographically ambitious competition, the Teesside Football League, finishing bottom but one in its first two seasons. In 1893–94 it rose to third out of 9 clubs. Despite this improvement, the club did not continue into 1894–95; its final recorded first-class game is from April 1894, and the club's final action was a triumphant one, winning the low-key Middlesbrough F.C. Medal Competition at the end of the season. Its disappearance was confirmed when it did not send a representative to the Teesside Football League's annual general meeting in July 1894. The Port Clarence name has since been revived for different clubs on occasion.

== Colours ==
The club wore "uniformly white jerseys".

== Ground ==
The club's ground was known as the Haverton Hill Ground, and was just to the west of Port Clarence itself. It was considered remote and hard to reach. The club's support was described as "foul-mouthed" and a "rough element".

== Notable players ==
A few of the Port players were chosen to represent the local associations in representative matches; left-winger T. Blencowe and centre-forward J. Haddock were both in the Durham squad for the match with the Staffordshire Association in 1887, and right-wingers T. Loughran and M. Whaling were selected by the Cleveland association to face Northumberland in 1892. There was a mite of controversy when Blencowe and Nicholson failed to turn up as reserves for the Durham FA match with Staffordshire in December 1888, but turned out for Port Clarence instead; Huntington put that down to the pair being unable to get time off work to travel to Sunderland, but were able to go straight from work to the Haverton Hill ground.
