= Darwen Old Wanderers F.C. =

Darwen Old Wanderers
- Full name: Darwen Old Wanderers Football Club
- Nickname: the Old Wanderers
- Founded: 1879
- Dissolved: 14 May 1889
- Ground: Pot House
- Chairman: Leonard Broadbent (solicitor)
Original colours	1887–89 colours

Darwen Old Wanderers F.C. was an English association football club from the town of Darwen in Lancashire.

== History ==
=== Foundation and early years ===
The club was formed in 1879, and may have started out as the works side of the Darwen Co-Operative; long-time captain Kirkham was a regular for the Co-operative, which played at the same Pot House ground as the Wanderers would use. The first reported game for the club under the Wanderers namw was against Livesey Grasshoppers at the start of the 1882–83 season, as part of a series of matches hosted by Blackburn Olympic.

The club's first seasons were low key, with the Wanderers first coming to local attention in 1882–83, by reaching the third round of the Lancashire Senior Cup, having beaten the Liverpool Football Club 6–4 in the first round. In the third round, the Wanderers lost to Padiham.

=== Increasing impact ===
Its first impact on the football world was when the club beat Bolton Wanderers 2–1 in the first round of the competition in 1883–84; a result which was considered a surprise by the club itself, with the Liverpool Mercury remarking that "a greater surprise than was witnessed at Bolton on Saturday is not likely to take place throughout the competition for the Lancashire Cup”. The only two downsides were that one of the Wanderers, Marsden, broke his leg after an accidental collision with a team-mate, and that the referee, a Mr Ormerod from Accrington, was attacked by the aghast home crowd.

The Wanderers made it through to the quarter-finals of the local competition, and were not disgraced in a 2–1 defeat at the mighty Blackburn Rovers, although the club's style was described as "rough".

=== FA Cup entry ===
Emboldened by this rise in fortune, the club entered the FA Cup for the first time in 1884–85. In the first round the club was drawn away to Higher Walton, with Mr Ormerod again acting as referee. The match ended in a draw, but the Wanderers won the replay 4–1, with two goals disallowed. In the second round the club beat Bolton Association with ease; notably, the crowd was only 1,000, despite no other matches going on in the area. The run ended in the third round with a defeat at Lower Darwen.

=== The professional era ===
At the Football Association meetings in London, the club voted in favour of allowing professionalism into competitive football, although, unable to send a representative along, it asked George Drummond of Preston North End to act as proxy. In 1885–86, the club was drawn to play the ambitious Burnley. On paper it looked to be a difficult task as Burnley had invested in a large number of professional players, while the Old Wanderers were still relying on six of the same team that had been playing three seasons earlier and nine from the previous season. However, the Football Association's rules on eligibility for the competition (requiring a 2-year residence period) made most of the Burnley players ineligible for the competition. As a consequence the Old Wanderers faced a reserve side and won 11–0, the club's biggest FA Cup victory, and Burnley's biggest competitive defeat. In an ominous sign for the future, on the same day, Burnley's new professionals played a friendly against Wolverhampton Wanderers and won 4–1.

A similar instance happened in the second round, when the club beat a weak Accrington side 2–1, in front of 1,000 spectators, while the first choice Owd Reds side beat Blackburn Olympic. In the third round, however, Blackburn Rovers, who had been illegally employing professionals for a couple of years, were able to field a full-strength side, and beat the Old Wanderers 6–1.

The difficulties of being a small side in an area saturated with football clubs - the town of Darwen alone hosted clubs such as Darwen itself, Darwen Ramblers, Darwen Rovers, Darwen Hibernians, Darwen Temperance, and in the next door village Lower Darwen, as well as the now-dissolved Lynwood and Lower Chapel - were laid bare in the first round of the 1886–87 FA Cup. The Old Wanderers had drawn the Glaswegian side Cowlairs, who would ordinarily be considered prestigious opponents for a friendly; yet, for a competitive match in "delightful" weather, the attendance, to see Cowlairs win 4–1, was a mere 600. One week later over three times that number saw Darwen beat Heart of Midlothian.

=== 1887–88 season: triumph and tragedy ===
The Old Wanderers did turn professional, but its list of professional players for the 1887–88 season did not include any "imports"; all were local men and most had played for the Old Wanderers since the amateur days. Burnley got a measure of revenge in the FA Cup, beating the Old Wanderers 4–0, with 3,000 attending at Turf Moor; however the FA ordered a replay at Pot House because of doubts over the eligibility of some of the Burnley players, and the cash-strapped Old Wanderers agreed to forfeit the tie in return for a monetary payment.

The club suffered from two accidents in the season. In October, the club played a minor friendly against Heaton Park, during which match one of the Old Wanderer players fell onto Heaton Park's James Harkins. Harkins suffered an injury which turned into an abscess, from which he died on 1 January 1888, the jury returning a verdict of accidental death. In November 1887, after losing at Port Vale, the Old Wanderers midfielder James Richardson leaned on the train door, which opened and threw him onto the tracks; fortunately he was not seriously injured.

That season the club had its best run in the Lancashire Cup. Although the club lost in the first round to Hurst, the Old Wanderers put in a successful protest that none of the Hurst players had been registered with the Lancashire Football Association. The club then beat the Blackburn side Cherrytree 3–2 away, and Burnley Union Star 6–2 at home, to reach the semi-finals, where the club was drawn to play Preston North End, who had already reached the FA Cup final. The club was given no chance in the match, played in heavy snow at Newton Heath, and North End duly won 6–1, before the largest crowd the Old Wanderers had ever played before, given as 7,000 despite the bad weather.

The final did not take place. The Lancashire FA arranged for it to be played in Blackburn, and Preston demanded a change in venue, "on account of the feeling between Blackburn [Rovers] and Preston". As the Lancashire FA refused to move the match, Preston withdrew from the Lancashire FA, and the other finalists, Accrington, were given a walk-over. However, in order to award the silver medallists for the runners-up, the Lancashire FA arranged a match between the Old Wanderers and the other semi-finalist losers, Witton, at Darwen's Barley Bank ground, which Witton won 2–0. Consequently, the Old Wanderers had obtained an unusual third place in the competition.

=== Winding up ===
Despite the long run in the Lancashire Cup of 1887–88, the club started the 1888–89 season £4 in debt, and, with the closest local clubs now engaged in activities with the Football League or the Combination, the club was unable to arrange high-profile fixtures; the biggest match was just before Christmas, against Newton Heath, which the Old Wanderers lost 4–0. With qualifying rounds now brought in to the FA Cup, the Old Wanderers did not enter, and the club lost in the second round of the Lancashire Cup to Burnley Union Star.

On 14 May 1889, at a meeting of the members of the club, the treasurer announced that there was now a positive balance of £4 5s 4.5d. However, after a long discussion, it was resolved that the club should cease to exist, due to not being selected for any league competition.

The name was briefly revived for a junior club in 1891, but that club seems to have lasted little more than four months, losing in the Lancashire Junior Cup 8–3 to Bell's Temperance in the second round and vanishing from the scene after a 4–0 defeat to Barrow at the end of the year.

== Colours ==
The club's original colours were black and white "quarters", which was the term at the time for counterchanged halved shirts. In 1887 they changed to pale blue and white halves, "à la Blackburn Rovers", with white knickers.

== Ground ==
The club played at the Pot House ground, which had its own club house and facilities.

== Key players ==
There were a number of players who stayed with the Old Wanderers from at least 1883 to the club's demise; the backs G. Moorhouse and R. Kirkham, Jonathan Pearson and captain J. W. Almond (who both played as forwards or half-backs), forward T. Chadwick, and winger J. Eccles.

One of the club's earliest players was Tot Rostron, who went on to play for the England national football team.

== Honours ==
Lancashire Cup

- Third place: 1887–88

East Lancashire Charity Shield

- Runners-up: 1883–84
