= 1879–80 Lancashire Senior Cup =

1879-80 Lancashire Senior Cup
Tournament details
- Country: England
- Venue(s): Lancashire
- Dates: 20 September 1879 - 20 March 1880
- Teams: 40

Final positions
- Champions: Darwen
- Runners-up: Blackburn Rovers

The 1879-80 Lancashire Senior Cup was the first edition of the Lancashire Football Association's most prestigious tournament, for association football clubs in the county of Lancashire.

== Background ==
The Lancashire Football Association was formed at the start of the 1878–79 season, at the instigation of the Darwen club. In June 1879, the Association decided to set up a competition, the prize being a 150 guinea cup, made by Monk Bros. of Bolton; the trophy was 3'3" high.

It was the biggest tournament played in Lancashire, and the most important tournament for the county's clubs, given the expense required to travel to the Kennington Oval for the later rounds of the FA Cup. While only 4 Lancashire clubs (Darwen, Blackburn Rovers, Eagley, and Turton) entered the 1879–80 FA Cup, 40 entered the Lancashire tournament.

== Participating teams ==
Participating clubs
Team	Founded	Secretary	Home ground	Jersey	Knickers	Hose
Accrington	1878	Fred W. Stocks	Accrington Cricket Field	Scarlet & black	Blue	Scarlet & black
Astley Bridge	1875	Squire Gregory	Sweetloves	Navy blue	White	Navy blue
Blackburn Christ Church	1874	John H. Penswick	Ewood	Blue	White with blue stripe	Blue
Blackburn Cob Wall	1870	Joseph Walmsley	Cob Wall Cricket Ground	Red & white stripes	not listed	Red & white stripes
Blackburn Park Road	1875	James Hayhurst	Haslingden Road	White	Blue	Blue & white
Blackburn Rising Sun*	1878	W. Jennings	Black Bull Inn	Navy blue & white stripes	Navy blue & white	White
Blackburn Rovers	1874	Walter Duckworth	Alexandra Meadows	Navy blue & white quartered	White	Navy blue
Blackburn St Andrew's	1876	John C. Glover	Cherry Tree	Navy blue & white	White with blue stripes	Navy blue & white
Blackburn St George's	1875	Jabez Walsh	Braeside, Revidge	White	Blue	not listed
Blackburn St Marks	1874	Samuel Liversedge	Pleasington	White	Blue with white stripe	Blue
Bolton All Saints*	1878	J. C. Paylor	Railway Arches, Hey Brow	Navy blue with red Maltese cross	Blue	Blue
Bolton Emmanuel	1877	Benjamin Isherwood	Morris Green Lane	Blue & white	Blue	Red
Bolton Hornets*	1878	T. J. Baillie	Dean Vale	Navy blue	Navy blue	White
Bolton North End	1877	James T. Lowe	Black Heath, Astley Bridge	White	White	Blue
Bolton Olympic*	1876	Daniel Horrocks	Tonge Fold	White	Blue	Black & white
Bolton Rovers	1877	J. Shorrock	Bolton Recreation Ground	Red & black	Blue	Red & black
Bolton St Paul's	1877	W. Nelson	Bolton Park Recreation Ground	Amber & black	Blue	Blue
Bolton Wanderers	1874	Thomas Rawthorne	Pikes Lane	Blue & white	Blue	Blue & white
Church	1874	B. F. Smith	Church Cricket Field	Black & white	White	not listed
Cloughfold	1877	J. H. Bentley	Myrtle Grove	Orange & blue	White	Orange & blue
Darwen	1870	W. T. Walsh	Barley Bank	Black & white stripes	White	Black & white
Darwen Foresters	1877	Edmund Bury	Darwen Chapels	Navy blue & white	White	Navy blue & white
Darwen Grasshoppers	1877	J. E. Fish	Benny Rough, Bury Fold Lane	Amber & black	White	Amber & black
Darwen Rangers	1878	F. Y. Singleton	Tithebarn	Royal blue & red	White	not listed
Eagley	1875	Jno. Mangnall	Volunteer Inn	White	White	Blue
Edgeworth*	1874	Thomas Duckworth	White Horse Inn	White	Blue	Black
Enfield	1877	W. T. Sumner	Enfield Cricket Ground	Navy blue	White	Navy blue
Great Lever	1877	Nathan Yates	Bradford Road	Navy blue	Navy blue	Orange & blue
Halliwell	1877	David Haslam	The Bennetts	Navy blue	White	Blue & white
Halliwell Jubilee*	1878	H. C. Fairhust	Church Meadow	Navy blue	White with red stripes	Navy blue
Haslingden Association	1876	J. C. Whittaker	Rye Hill	Maroon & white	White	White
Haslingden Grane	1876	Jonathan J. Hargreaves	Lane Ends	Blue & black	White	Blue & black
Livesey United	1874	J. Hacking	Near Mill Hill (Navigation Inn)	Red	White with red stripe	Not listed
Lower Chapel	1877	J. H. Leach	Knowl Meadows, Darwen	Red & white	White	Not listed
Lower Darwen	1877	J. H. Marsden	Hey Meadow	Dark blue & white	Dark blue	Dark blue & white
Lynwood*	1879	B. Whalley	Lynwood, Darwen	White	White	Black
Manchester Wanderers*	1878	C. S. Weir	Brooks Bar	White	White	White
Middleton*	1878	R. Robertson	Field in Tonge	Navy blue with white star	Blue	Blue
Padiham*	1878	John Pollard	Albert Mill	Navy blue with red sash	White	Blue
Turton	1872	W. T. Dixon	Cheetham Arms	Blue & black	Blue	Blue

== Format ==
The competition was organized as a straight knockout tournament, with replays to a conclusion. All clubs would be put in the initial draw, so the tournament would not be reduced quickly to a power of 2, but would allow ad hoc byes for each round in which there was an odd number of teams.

== Results ==
=== First round ===
The clubs were paired off at a draw on 16 August 1879, with ties to be played off by the last weekend in October. The first tie was played off at Padiham, in front of 1,400 spectators, who saw visitors Haslingden Association take the tie 2–1. One tie was given dispensation for a replay to take place on Saturday 1 November, namely that between Darwen Foresters and Haslingden Grane, but Grane did not turn up at Darwen Chapels, so the tie was awarded to the Foresters.

The biggest win of the round was Livesey United's win at Halliwell Jubilee, although the score was also given as 8–0; five goals came in the first half, United having won the toss and chosen to kick with the slope. Despite the hammering, Jubilee's play was described as "pleasant and friendly". Turton also scored 9 goals, against Bolton North End, one of many clubs emerging from cricket clubs.

Blackburn Rovers, the competition favourite, was nearly eliminated at the first stage, being held to a 1–1 draw by Accrington-based side Enfield, but Rovers had no problems in the replay. The tie between Lynwood and Bolton Olympic however had been "a very disagreeable one throughout" - the attendance was a mere 50, due to a rival game taking place at Darwen, and the game was so violent that in one scrimmage the goal-posts were knocked down. Olympic held the game up by threatening to walk off after Lynwood took a 2–1 lead, in protest at the refereeing, and after Lynwood's late winner, "players and spectators went off the field discussing and disputing the game".

Date	Home	Score	Away
20 September 1879	Padiham	1–2	Haslingden Association
27 September 1879	Blackburn Park Road	6–0	Bolton Emmanuel
27 September 1879	Bolton North End	1–9	Turton
27 September 1879	Darwen	7–0	Darwen Grasshoppers
4 October 1879	Blackburn Christ Church	8–0	Bolton Hornets
4 October 1879	Church	4–0	Blackburn St Andrew's
4 October 1879	Cloughfold	4–5	Great Lever
4 October 1879	Lynwood	5–4	Bolton Olympic
11 October 1879	Astley Bridge	6–0	Blackburn Rising Sun
11 October 1879	Blackburn Cob Wall	0–3	Manchester Wanderers
11 October 1879	Bolton Wanderers	5–2	Bolton All Saints
11 October 1879	Enfield	1–1	Blackburn Rovers
11 October 1879	Halliwell Jubilee	0–9	Livesey United
11 October 1879	Lower Darwen	3–1	Darwen Rangers
18 October 1879	Accrington	4–1	Halliwell
18 October 1879	Blackburn St Mark's	0–0	Bolton St Paul's
18 October 1879	Haslingden Grane	1–1	Darwen Foresters
25 October 1879	Bolton Rovers	2–5	Eagley
25 October 1879	Lower Chapel	4–2	Blackburn St George's
25 October 1879	Middleton	1–6	Edgeworth

=== Replays ===
Date	Home	Score	Away
23 October 1879	Blackburn Rovers	5–1	Enfield
25 October 1879	Bolton St Paul's	1–4	Blackburn St Mark's
1 November 1879	Darwen Foresters	w/o	Haslingden Grane

=== Second round ===
1,500 spectators witnessed the biggest win of the competition at Darwen, where the home side scored 12 goals against Haslingden Association; the score would have been even higher, but Darwen agreed to have three goals chalked off for offside.

The match between Lower Chapel and Lynwood had to be replayed, having ended 4–3 to Lower Chapel, after Lynwood protested that the goal posts were too high; the replay also took place at the Lower Chapel ground, and the home side won 3–1.

Date	Home	Score	Away
25 October 1879	Darwen	12–1	Haslingden Association
1 November 1879	Lower Chapel	void	Lynwood
8 November 1879	Eagley	4–1	Edgeworth
22 November 1879	Accrington	3–2	Blackburn St Mark's
29 November 1879	Blackburn Rovers	4–0	Bolton Wanderers
29 November 1879	Church	2–6	Manchester Wanderers
29 November 1879	Great Lever	0–3	Turton
29 November 1879	Lower Darwen	3–0	Livesey United
6 December 1879	Astley Bridge	2–1	Blackburn Christ Church
6 December 1879	Darwen Foresters	0–2	Blackburn Park Road

==== Replay ====
Date	Home	Score	Away
20 December 1879	Lower Chapel	3–1	Lynwood

=== Third round ===
The third round saw the shock of the tournament, as FA cup entrant Eagley was unexpectedly hammered 8–2 at Lower Chapel.

Date	Home	Score	Away
1 January 1880	Accrington	4–1	Lower Darwen
10 January 1880	Blackburn Rovers	2–0	Turton
10 January 1880	Darwen	5–0	Astley Bridge
10 January 1880	Manchester Wanderers	2–0	Blackburn Park Road
17 January 1880	Lower Chapel	8–2	Eagley

=== Fourth round ===
As an odd number of teams remained, one team had to be given a bye; the draw gave it to Blackburn Rovers. Manchester Wanderers took the lead at Darwen through an own goal, but had no answer to the professional side afterwards, and two further claimed goals for Darwen were disallowed.

Date	Home	Score	Away
7 February 1880	Accrington	4–3	Lower Chapel
21 February 1880	Darwen	11–1	Manchester Wanderers

=== Fifth round ===
As Blackburn Rovers had received a bye from the fourth round, it was not eligible for the bye at the fifth round stage; the lot gave the bye to Darwen. The one tie took place at Blackburn's Alexandra Meadows, and the home advantage proved crucial, as Rovers ran out 3–1 winners. The pick of the goals came from Rovers' winger Duckworth near the end, dribbling from near his own goal past most of the Accrington side, before slotting between the posts.

Date	Home	Score	Away
6 March 1880	Blackburn Rovers	3–1	Accrington

== Final ==
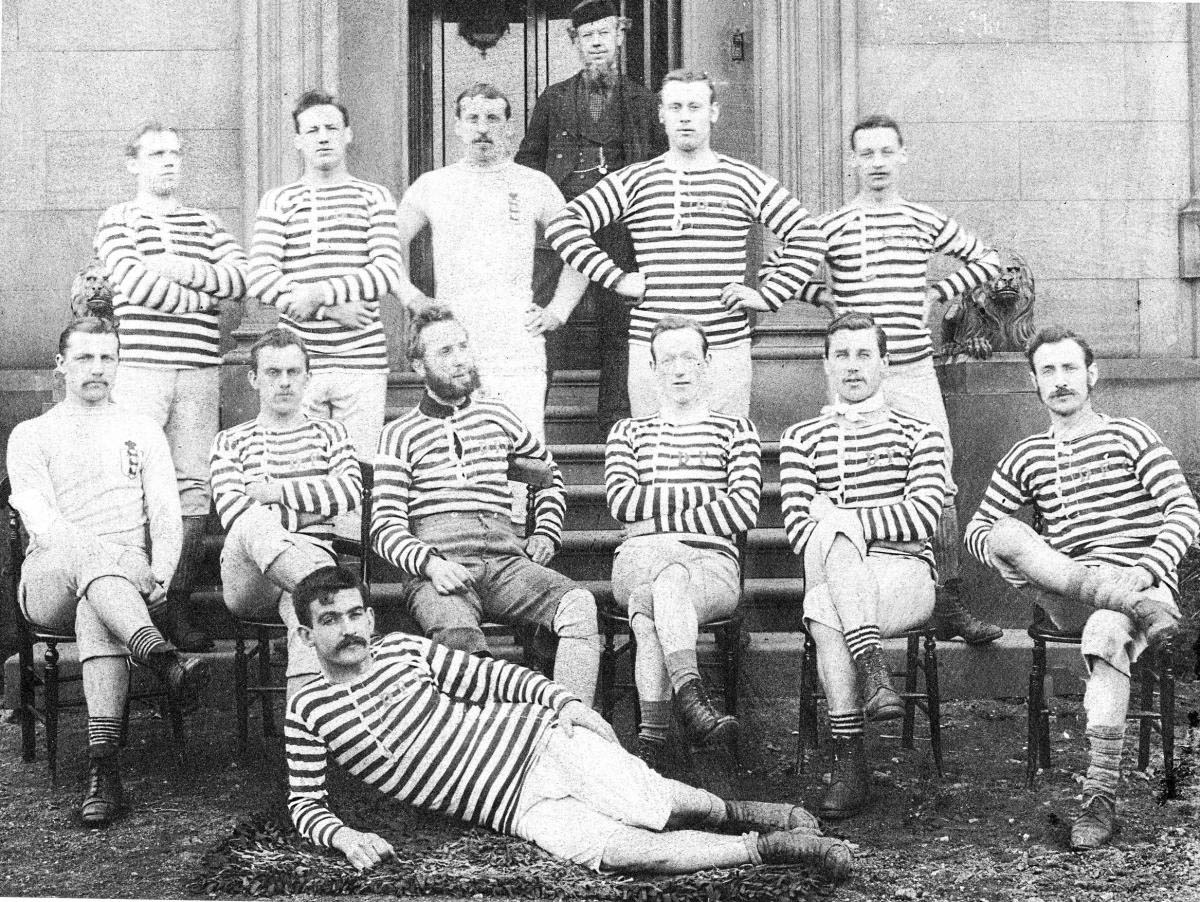
The winning Darwen side.

By common consent, the two strongest sides in the county had reached the final, but instead of choosing a neutral ground, the Lancashire FA ordered it to take place at Darwen's Barley Bank. Neither club was quite at full strength, as both faced issues over the eligibility of key players; William Kirkham of Darwen had been working in Leeds, Yorkshire, so did not fulfil the residency requirement, while "Monkey" Hornby of Rovers fulfilled the residency requirement, but because of rugby commitments had not featured for Rovers, so there was a question whether his registration was regular. In the event neither was chosen.

The reported attendance of over 10,000 was the highest ever recorded for an association football match; it was 50% higher than that at the 1880 FA Cup final, and more than double that at the Birmingham Senior Cup final.

Darwen started the game kicking into the wind, despite which Bury gave it the lead with a "clever screw kick". The advantage of the wind was such that Darwen scored the second two minutes into the second half, thanks to a move by Marshall and Rostron on the right with Gledhill in the middle, finished off by Rostron. Darwen claimed two goals near the end, although only one was recorded in the official score.

20 March 1880

Darwen	3–0	Blackburn Rovers
Bury; Rostron; Marshall

Barley Bank
Attendance: >10,000
Referee: C. J. Spencer, Nottinghamshire Football Association

Darwen	Blackburn Rovers

GK	Joe Broughton
DF	Jack Duxbury
DF	Fergus Suter
MF	Sam Fish
MF	W. H. Moorhouse
RW	Thomas Marshall
RW	Tot Rostron
FW	Dr James Gledhill
FW	J. C. Holden
LW	Tom Bury
LW	Bob Kirkham

GK	Roger Howarth
DF	Doctor Greenwood
DF	A. Birtwistle
MF	Fred Hargreaves
MF	W. R. Latham
LW	John Duckworth
LW	J. Hanson
FW	Jimmy Brown
FW	J. Hindle
RW	John Hargreaves
RW	Richard Birtwistle

== Aftermath ==
The 1880–81 season would see an increase in entrants to 43, although for many of the clubs from Blackburn, Bolton, and Darwen, the first competition would prove to be their only entry. However the 1880–81 competition saw a greater geographical spread, with entries from Preston North End, two clubs from Liverpool, and even a club from Barrow. By 1884–85, the competition had over 100 entries, which resulted in the Lancashire FA splitting the tournament in future so that only senior clubs could enter, a separate Lancashire Junior Cup being created for the pure amateurs.
