= Bolton Olympic F.C. =

Bolton Olympic
- Full name: Bolton Olympic Football Club
- Nickname: the Olympians
- Founded: 1876
- Dissolved: 1886
- Ground: Tonge Fold
- Secretary: H. H. Brownlow
Home colours

Bolton Olympic F.C. was an English association football club from Bolton in Lancashire.

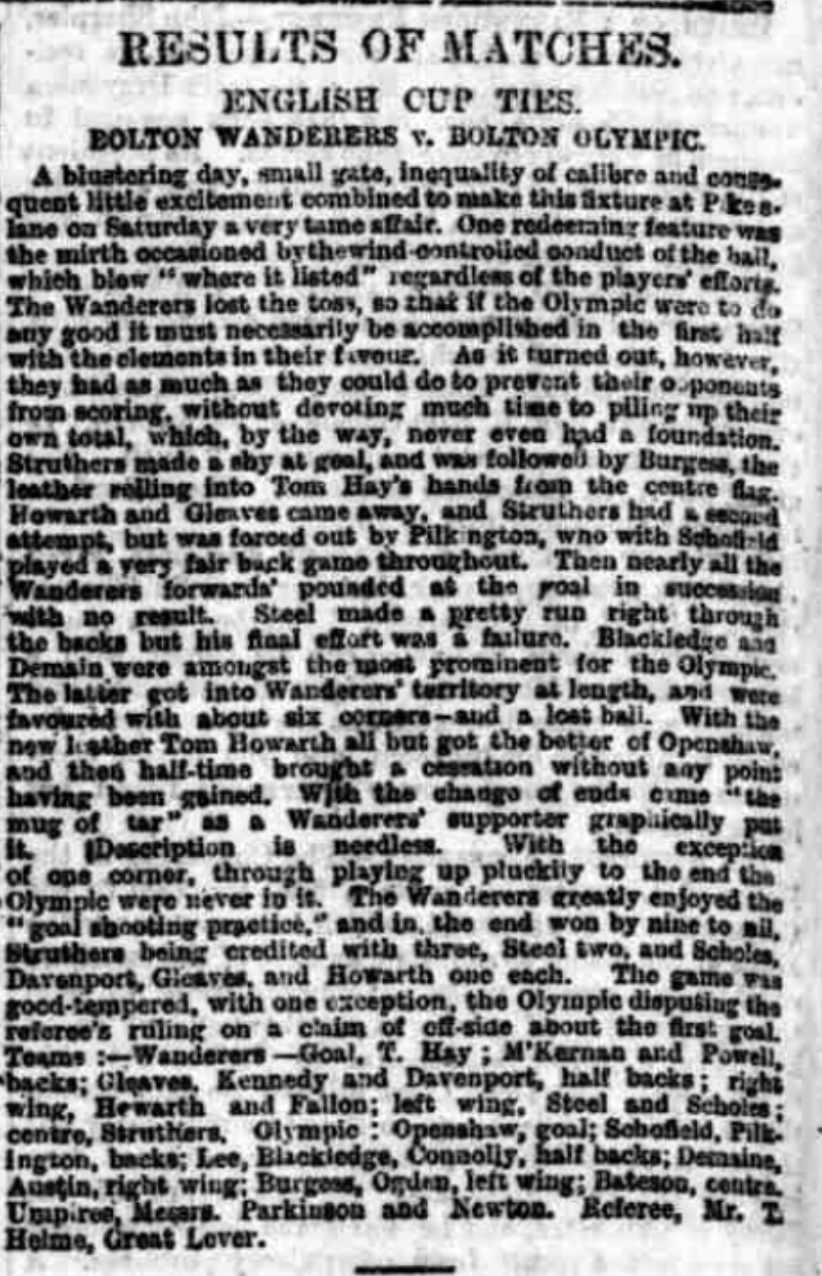
1883–84 FA Cup 1st Round, Bolton Wanderers 9–0 Bolton Olympic, Bolton Evening News, 12 November 1883

== History ==
The club was founded in 1876 under the name Bolton St George's. After the 1878–79 season the club changed its name to Bolton Olympic. The club took part in the first Lancashire Senior Cup in 1879–80, losing 5–4 to Lynwood F.C. of Darwen in the first round, having been 4–3 up with six minutes to go but conceding two late goals via scrimmages. The match that was "very disagreeable throughout, owing to the unseemly disputes which arose among the players and the interference of the onlookers, who behaved very rudely to the visitors, in several instances almost getting from words to blows", which was blamed in part on the Lynwood pitch being "in very bad condition"; at one point the Olympians walked off in protest.

The Olympians reached the second round in 1880–81, but were eliminated by Great Lever after three ties; the first a draw, the second an Olympian win, but voided because the goalkeeper had not been a club member for the month required by the regulations, and the third a win for Great Lever. The Olympians protested that one of the goals was too narrow, but the discrepancy was under one-eighth of an inch.

The club entered the FA Cup in 1882–83 for the first time. The club was drawn at home to Eagley, although the majority of the crowd of 300 was from Eagley. A remarkable game saw the Olympians open the scoring, but they were never ahead in the match again, losing to the unlikely score of 7–4. The club had a plum draw in the second round of the Lancashire at Darwen, who had to send reserves because of a clash with an FA Cup tie; despite this, the Darreners had an easy 3–0 win in a match called off after 60 minutes, by mutual agreement, as snow was falling.

In the 1883–84 FA Cup, the club was drawn to visit Bolton Wanderers, the score being goalless at half-time, but the Wanderers - with the wind behind them - scoring 9 without reply in the second.

The match was considered the "death-knell" for the club, as not only was it a heavy defeat, but the foregone conclusion of the result meant that the gate was low, with little revenue for a club "sadly in want of funds and encouragement". The club did stagger on through the season, going out of the Lancashire Senior Cup in the third round (its best run) to Witton, and the last reported competition match for the club was a 2–1 defeat to Bradshaw in the Lancashire Charity Cup at the end of the season. The result was all the more galling as the tie had been seen as an easy one for Bolton - and came after a Bolton protest about one Sharples, whom Bolton alleged to have been Cup-tied for playing in a junior competition, overturned a 2–1 win for Bradshaw at the first time of asking. The club continued on a low-key level until 1886, and a separate club of the same name was set up in 1887.

== Colours ==
The club's colours were white jersey, blue knickers, and black and white hose.

== Ground ==
The club played at Tonge Fold, three quarters of a mile from Bolton railway station, facilities being provided at the Bowling Green Inn.
