= Bolton Association F.C. =

Bolton Association
- Full name: Bolton Association Football Club
- Nicknames: the BA, the Boltonians, the Association
- Founded: 1883
- Dissolved: 1886
- Ground: Green Lane
- Hon. Secretaries: W. A. Scott, J. Fairhurst
Home colours

Bolton Association F.C. was an English association football club from Bolton in Lancashire.

== History ==
The club was founded in 1883 by a Mr J. Walker of the Bolton Cricket Club, who became the club's initial captain, as a contrast to the illegal professionalism of Bolton Wanderers. The Association was part of the club name, rather than a descriptor for the code the team played, to avoid confusion with the Bolton Rugby Football Club.

The club started as a side "solely for the recreation to be obtained from its pursuit, and not with the exclusive determination to win at all hazards which actuates the management of the other organisation"; when trying to recruit players, the club relied on persuasion rather than "inducement", an attitude contrasting with a local unnamed club offering 5 shillings per win and half-a-crown per defeat. Membership of the club was set at 10/6, or free with membership of the cricket club.

The quixotic nature of such an approach, and the change in the nature of the game, were shown up before the season's end. The club's first competitive football came in the Lancashire Senior Cup, and the club only lost narrowly at home to the more experienced Enfield in the first round. In the FA Cup that season, the club easily beat Bradshaw 5–1 in the first round, and in the second was considered to have done well to restrict Bolton Wanderers to three goals, especially as the forward Tom Sowerbutts was "rendered almost useless by a violent charge early in the game".

However, although the Association beat Cambridge University 2–1 at home at Christmas 1883 and Chorley by 10 goals to 1 a month before, as well as only going down 3–1 at home to Preston North End, the club's second half of the season showed up the problems the club was facing; it lost 7–1 at Notts County, 6–1 in the return at Preston North End, 11–0 at Great Lever (despite playing with 13 men), and 12–2 at Blackburn Olympic. New captain W. E. Walker had the consolation of representing the Lancashire FA in December 1883, called up as a last-minute reserve to play at half-back in a match against the Sheffield Football Association; however his performance was not to the crowd's pleasing, in part because they expected to see a Blackburn Rovers player, in part because Walker was not in his usual right-wing position.

At the end of the club's first season, three of its better players left for professional contracts; Richard Turner and Fred Harper to Blackburn Rovers, and George Dobson, to Bolton Wanderers. A number of other players soon followed suit, leaving the club having to recruit an almost entirely new first XI; for the club's 5–0 Lancashire Senior Cup first round win over the obscure Heapey Institute (the Chorley club's only match in the competition), 10 of the Association were new players, only the faithful Walker surviving from the previous season. The second round saw a by-now habitual thumping, 10–1 at Oswaldtwistle Rovers.

Despite the club's adherence to amateurism, in October 1884, the club was part of a proposed breakaway group, the British Football Association, which agitated for professionalism. Its adherence to amateurism at least got it past the first round of the 1884–85 FA Cup, scheduled opponent Astley Bridge withdrawing after the Lancashire FA fell out with the Football Association over the professionalism issue and a number of professional clubs scratched, while Bolton Association, despite rumours, confirmed its wish to continue. In the second round an "indifferent" team lost 7–2 at Darwen Old Wanderers.

Outgunned in a professional environment - the victory over Heapey Institute being the club's only win in 1884–85, otherwise recording 3 draws and 14 defeats - the club retreated to friendlies, with the Bolton Association name being applied also to an XI made up of players from other clubs in the Bolton area for a commemorative match against Bolton Wanderers in March 1885. The original B.A.s were described as defunct in early October 1886. The club did pull together an XI in an emergency that month, after Hindley F.C. had been let down by Astley Bridge reserves for a scheduled match, but the scratch side - featuring the Turner brothers - was hammered 9–1.

=== Revival ===
The club - or at least its name - was revived, with references to an amateurside playing in the Bolton Junior League and Cup from 1889. A 5–3 Cup defeat at Deane in November 1891, in which the Association was playing "worse than ever", seemed to confirm that there were "good grounds for the rumours about the split in the club". The club did at least see out the season but did not re-emerge for 1892–93. One sad aftermath was the club's last secretary, Peter Cornett, was held liable for £9 unpaid rent on the club's final ground.

== Colours ==
The club adopted colours which were "quite out of the common"; dark blue and canary yellow vertical striped shirts, rather than jerseys.

== Ground ==
The club originally played at Green Lane, which was the cricket club's ground, and reputed to be the best in the county. In 1884, the club moved to a new ground, which the club prosaically christened New Ground, on the Manchester Road. The club's final ground was on Ainsworth Lane.

== Notable player ==
- Richard Turner, who played for the club in its first season, and won the FA Cup with Blackburn Rovers in 1885
