= 1883–84 FA Cup =

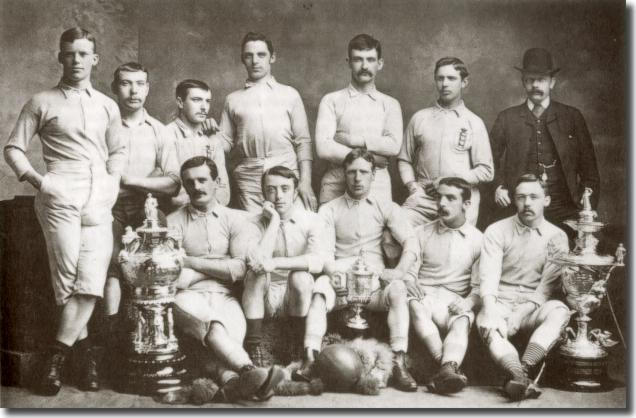
- The Blackburn Rovers end of season photo with the FA Cup (centre)

Tournament details
- Country: England; Scotland; Wales
- Teams: 100

Final positions
- Champions: Blackburn Rovers (1st title)
- Runners-up: Queen's Park

The 1883–84 Football Association Challenge Cup was the 13th staging of the FA Cup, England's oldest football tournament. One hundred teams entered, sixteen more than the previous season, although three of the one hundred never played a match.

== First round ==
| Home club | Score | Away club | Date |
|---|---|---|---|
| Darwen | 2–2 | Church | 27 October 1883 |
| Grantham | 3–2 | Spilsby | 10 November 1883 |
| Preston North End | Bye | | |
| Stoke | 1–2 | Manchester | 10 November 1883 |
| Reading | 2–2 | South Reading | 10 November 1883 |
| Sheffield | 1–4 | Lockwood Brothers | 10 November 1883 |
| Clapham Rovers | Walkover | Kildare | |
| Windsor | 5–3 | Royal Engineers | 10 November 1883 |
| Swifts | Bye | | |
| Rochester | 2–1 | Uxbridge | 3 November 1883 |
| Druids (Wales) | 0–1 | Northwich Victoria | 10 November 1883 |
| Notts County | 3–1 | Sheffield Heeley | 10 November 1883 |
| Hendon | 3–2 | Old Etonians | 10 November 1883 |
| Old Foresters | 2–1 | Dreadnought | 10 November 1883 |
| Nottingham Forest | Walkover | Redcar | |
| Romford | 3–0 | Woodford Bridge | 3 November 1883 |
| West End | 1–0 | Maidenhead | 10 November 1883 |
| Blackburn Rovers | 7–1 | Southport | 20 October 1883 |
| Hanover United | 1–6 | Brentwood | 3 November 1883 |
| Mosquitos | 3–2 | Pilgrims | 10 November 1883 |
| Stafford Road | 5–1 | Aston Unity | 10 November 1883 |
| Acton | 0–2 | Upton Park | 10 November 1883 |
| Calthorpe | 0–9 | Walsall Town | 10 November 1883 |
| Sheffield Wednesday | Bye | | |
| Blackburn Olympic | 5–1 | Darwen Ramblers | 13 October 1883 |
| Reading Minster | 1–10 | Old Carthusians | 10 November 1883 |
| Small Heath Alliance | 1–1 | Birmingham Excelsior | 20 October 1883 |
| Blackburn Park Road | 6–0 | Low Moor | 27 October 1883 |
| Bolton Wanderers | 9–0 | Bolton Olympic | 10 November 1883 |
| Accrington | 4–0 | Blackpool St John's | 10 November 1883 |
| Wednesbury Old Athletic | 5–0 | Mitchell St George's | 10 November 1883 |
| Hornchurch | 0–9 | Marlow | 10 November 1883 |
| Clitheroe | 3–3 | South Shore | 10 November 1883 |
| Spital | 1–1 | Rotherham Town | 10 November 1883 |
| Great Lever | 4–1 | Astley Bridge | 20 October 1883 |
| Halliwell | 2–5 | Eagley | 13 October 1883 |
| Oswestry | 2–0 | Hartford St John's | 10 November 1883 |
| Walsall Swifts | 1–5 | Aston Villa | 10 November 1883 |
| Old Westminsters | 3–0 | Chatham | 3 November 1883 |
| Wrexham Olympic (Wales) | Walkover | Liverpool Ramblers | |
| Upton Rangers | 0–7 | Old Wykehamists | 10 November 1883 |
| Bolton Association | 5–1 | Bradshaw | 3 November 1883 |
| Hull Town | 1–3 | Grimsby Town | 3 November 1883 |
| Wolverhampton Wanderers | 4–1 | Long Eaton Rangers | 27 October 1883 |
| Rossendale | 2–6 | Irwell Springs | 17 November 1883 |
| Derby Midland | Bye | | |
| Davenham | 2–0 | Macclesfield Town | 10 November 1883 |
| Hurst | 3–1 | Turton | 20 October 1883 |
| Crewe Alexandra | 0–10 | Queen's Park (Scotland) | 6 October 1883 |
| Middlesbrough | 1–5 | Staveley | 10 November 1883 |
| West Bromwich Albion | 0–2 | Wednesbury Town | 10 November 1883 |
| Padiham | 3–1 | Lower Darwen | 31 October 1883 |

=== Replays ===
| Home club | Score | Away club | Date |
|---|---|---|---|
| Church | 0–1 | Darwen | 3 November 1883 |
| South Reading | 0–4 | Reading | 17 November 1883 |
| Birmingham Excelsior | 3–2 | Small Heath Alliance | 10 November 1883 |
| South Shore | 3–2 | Clitheroe | 24 November 1883 |
| Rotherham Town | 7–2 | Chesterfield Spital | 17 November 1883 |

== Second round ==
| Home club | Score | Away club | Date |
|---|---|---|---|
| Darwen | 1–2 | Blackburn Olympic | 1 December 1883 |
| Grantham | 4–0 | Grimsby Town | 26 November 1883 |
| Preston North End | 4–1 | Great Lever | 1 December 1883 |
| Reading | 1–0 | West End | 1 December 1883 |
| Clapham Rovers | 7–0 | Rochester | 1 December 1883 |
| Queen's Park (Scotland) | 15–0 | Manchester | 1 December 1883 |
| Upton Park | Bye | | |
| Windsor | 0–1 | Old Wykehamists | 1 December 1883 |
| Swifts | 2–0 | Marlow | 1 December 1883 |
| Notts County | 3–0 | Nottingham Forest | 1 December 1883 |
| Eagley | Bye | | |
| Romford | 3–1 | Mosquitos | 1 December 1883 |
| Brentwood | Bye | | |
| Stafford Road | 0–5 | Aston Villa | 1 December 1883 |
| Old Carthusians | 2–7 | Old Foresters | 24 November 1883 |
| Staveley | 3–1 | Sheffield Wednesday | 1 December 1883 |
| Blackburn Park Road | 2–3 (Note: Accrington was disqualified for fielding a professional, and Park Road, anticipating defeat by Blackburn Olympic, withdrew from the competition.) | Accrington | 24 November 1883 |
| Bolton Wanderers | 3–0 | Bolton Association | 1 December 1883 |
| Wednesbury Old Athletic | 4–2 | Wolverhampton Wanderers | 1 December 1883 |
| Lockwood Brothers | 3–1 | Rotherham Town | 1 December 1883 |
| Walsall Town | 2–2 | Wednesbury Town | 1 December 1883 |
| Northwich Victoria | 5–1 | Davenham (Wales) | 24 November 1883 |
| South Shore | 0–7 | Blackburn Rovers | 1 December 1883 |
| Old Westminsters | 2–1 | Hendon | 1 December 1883 |
| Wrexham Olympic (Wales) | 3–4 | Oswestry | 1 December 1883 |
| Hurst | 3–2 (Note: After a protest that a Hurst player had been wearing metal plates in his boots, the FA ordered a replay, but Hurst failed to turn up, so Irwell Springs was put into the third round: Bolton Evening News, 29 December 1883, p. 3) | Irwell Springs | 1 December 1883 |
| Padiham | Bye | | |
| Birmingham Exclesior | 1–1 | Derby Midland | 1 December 1883 |

=== Replays ===
| Home club | Score | Away club | Date |
|---|---|---|---|
| Wednesbury Town | 6–0 | Walsall Town | 8 December 1883 |
| Irwell Springs | Walkover | Hurst | |
| Derby Midland | 2–1 | Birmingham Excelsior | 15 December 1883 |

== Third round ==
| Home club | Score | Away club | Date |
|---|---|---|---|
| Grantham | 1–4 | Notts County | 20 December 1883 |
| Preston North End | 9–1 | Eagley | 29 December 1883 |
| Reading | 1–6 | Upton Park | 22 December 1883 |
| Clapham Rovers | 1–2 | Swifts | 22 December 1883 |
| Old Wykehamists | Bye | | |
| Old Foresters | Bye | | |
| Romford | 1–4 | Brentwood | 29 December 1883 |
| Blackburn Rovers | 3–0 | Padiham | 29 December 1883 |
| Blackburn Olympic | Walkover | Blackburn Park Road | |
| Staveley | 1–0 | Lockwood Brothers | 29 December 1883 |
| Bolton Wanderers | 8–1 | Irwell Springs | 29 December 1883 |
| Wednesbury Old Athletic | 4–7 | Aston Villa | 29 December 1883 |
| Northwich Victoria | Bye | | |
| Oswestry | 1–7 | Queen's Park (Scotland) | 29 December 1883 |
| Old Westminsters | Bye | | |
| Wednesbury Town | 1–0 | Derby Midland | 29 December 1883 |

== Fourth round ==
| Home club | Score | Away club | Date |
|---|---|---|---|
| Preston North End | 1–1 (Note: The FA upheld an Upton Park protest that Preston had fielded ineligible professionals, and disqualified Preston.) | Upton Park | 19 January 1884 |
| Queen's Park (Scotland) | 6–1 | Aston Villa | 19 January 1884 |
| Swifts | 2–1 | Old Foresters | 19 January 1884 |
| Notts County | 2–2 | Bolton Wanderers | 19 January 1884 |
| Blackburn Rovers | 5–1 | Staveley | 19 January 1884 |
| Blackburn Olympic | 6–0 | Old Wykehamists | 19 January 1884 |
| Northwich Victoria | 3–0 | Brentwood | 19 January 1884 |
| Old Westminsters | 5–0 | Wednesbury Town | 19 January 1884 |

=== Replay ===
| Home club | Score | Away club | Date |
|---|---|---|---|
| Bolton Wanderers | 1–2 | Notts County | 2 February 1884 |

== Fifth round ==
| Home club | Score | Away club | Date |
|---|---|---|---|
| Upton Park | 0–3 | Blackburn Rovers | 9 February 1884 |
| Notts County | 1–1 | Swifts | 9 February 1884 |
| Blackburn Olympic | 9–1 | Northwich Victoria | 9 February 1884 |
| Old Westminsters | 0–1 | Queen's Park (Scotland) | 9 February 1884 |

=== Replay ===
| Home club | Score | Away club | Date |
|---|---|---|---|
| Swifts | 0–1 | Notts County | 14 February 1884 |

== Semi finals ==
| Home club | Score | Away club | Date |
|---|---|---|---|
| Queen's Park (Scotland) | 4–0 | Blackburn Olympic | 1 March 1884 |
| Blackburn Rovers | 1–0 | Notts County | 1 March 1884 |

== Final ==
| Home club | Score | Away club | Date |
|---|---|---|---|
| Blackburn Rovers | 2–1 | Queen's Park (Scotland) | 29 March 1884 |
