= Great Lever F.C. =

Great Lever
- Full name: Great Lever Football Club
- Nicknames: the Leverites, the Woodsiders
- Founded: 1877
- Dissolved: 1887
- Ground: Woodsides
1881–83 colours	from 1883 colours

Great Lever Football Club were an English football club founded in 1877, from Great Lever (/ˈleɪvə(r)/, LAY-ver), near Farnworth in Lancashire, within the town of Bolton, England. The club was briefly one of the best sides in England.

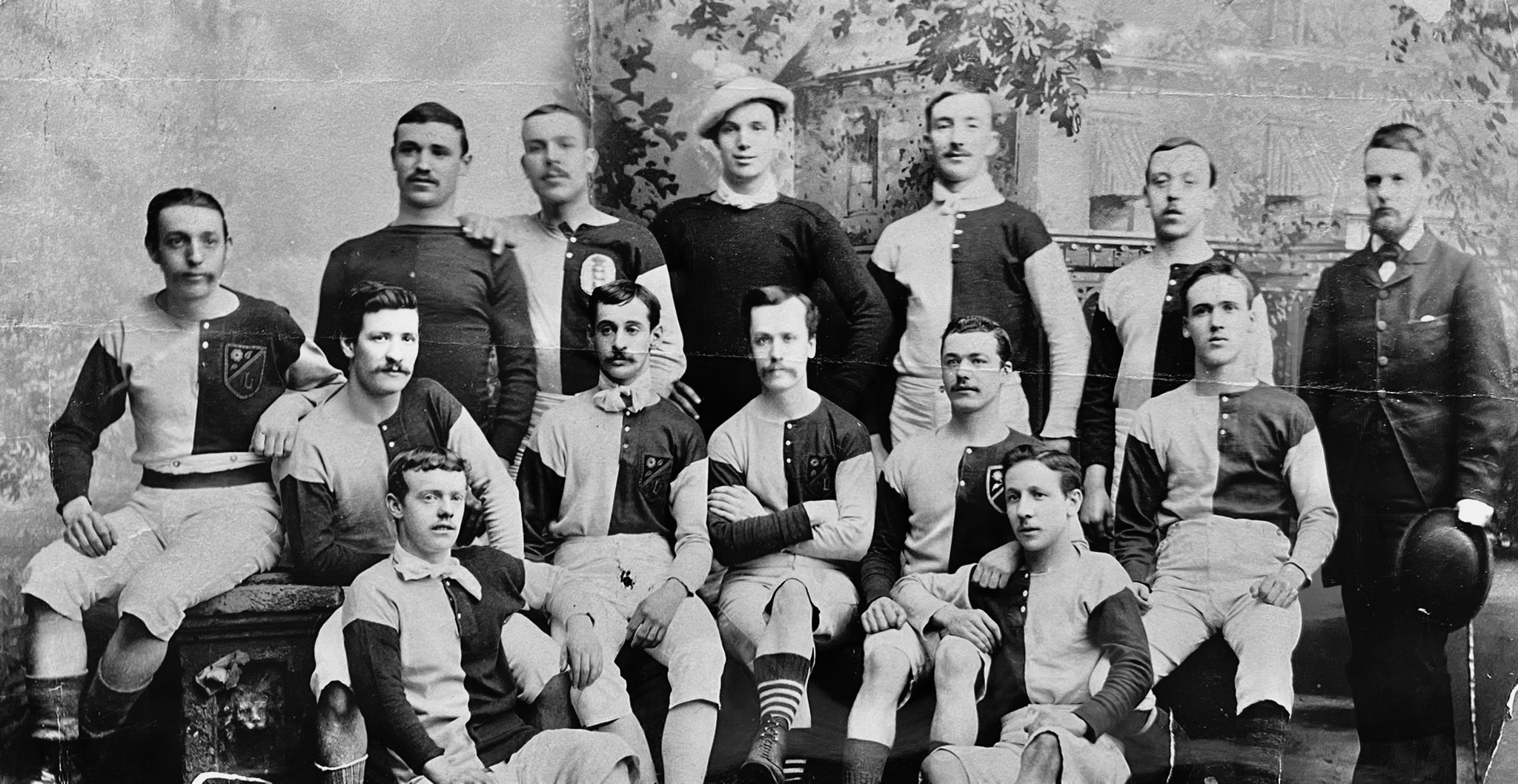
The Great Lever football club, 16 May 1883, photographed by Ellen May of St George Road, Bolton. Alf Jones is third from the left in the standing row

== History ==
=== Formation ===
The club was formed by parishioners in St Bartholomew's Church, Great Lever. It was a founder member of the Lancashire Football Association in 1878. The club entered the first-ever Lancashire Senior Cup in the 1879–80 season. In the first round, the club beat Clough Fold 5–4 at home, but lost to Turton F.C. 3–0 in the second.

=== Growing reputation ===
In 1880–81, the club beat Everton in the first round of the same competition; Everton protested because the referee was not a neutral, and the Lancashire FA ordered a replay, which the Leverites won 7–1, with two disallowed goals.

In the second round, the Leverites eliminated Bolton Olympic after three ties; the first a draw, the second an Olympian win, but voided because the goalkeeper had not been a club member for the month required by the regulations, and the third a win for Great Lever. The Olympians protested that one of the goals was too narrow, but the discrepancy was under one-eighth of an inch. The run ended in the third round to Bolton Wanderers, just before the Trotters started paying players in breach of regulations.

The club reached one stage further in 1881–82, losing in the quarter-finals to a Blackburn Olympic side which dangerously under-estimated the growing strength of the Leverites, and came to the tie with some key players missing. The referee, Mr Duxbury of Darwen, was suspected by many of the home fans in the 1,000 crowd of favouritism and the spectators "acted in a most unbecoming manner" to him.

In 1882–83, the club lost in the third round of the Lancashire Cup to Eagley, in a replay, amid controversy; the Leverites claimed the tie as Eagley refused to play extra-time in the original match. One problem the club had was that it had recently brought in players who were ineligible for the tournament as they had not lived in the area long enough, requiring the Leverites to play a reserve side in the competition.

One of those recent signings was Alf Jones, from Walsall Swifts, who, at the end of the season, played for England against Scotland in the annual international match; the only player from the north to be capped for England that season and the only time a Great Lever player was capped.

The improvements in the first team were shown by Great Lever beating Accrington 4–1, a 13-man Bolton Association 11–0, and the Birmingham side Excelsior 9–0, although the club went down to Walsall Town in another friendly before a crowd of 1,500.

=== Increased funding and new ground ===
Before the start of the 1883–84 season, the club went on a spending spree, bringing in players such as Reuben Wilson from Bolton Wanderers, Hodgetts and Green from Birmingham clubs, 'Tot' Rostron from Darwen, and other players from Accrington, Wrexham, and Padiham; this meant the team had two first-class clubs available, one with new stars for lucrative friendlies, and one with the 'local' players for the Lancashire Cup. Given the small crowds the club had, it is likely that the club was being heavily funded by local mill owners, especially given club secretary John Roscoe was from a mill-owning family. At the time professionalism was illegal, but, especially in Lancashire, clubs got around this by having players given sinecure jobs to pay a footballer's wage. Following this recruitment, one newspaper was even touting Great Lever as one of the two favourites for the Cup, along with Blackburn Rovers.

This financial help is borne out by the club moving to a new, enclosed ground, Woodsides, enabling charging of admission fees. The ground was near a house called Woodlands, but two mills in the south of Great Lever were called Woodsides and it is probably that this was an early form of advertising from the club's new benefactors, similar to "works" sides like Jardines F.C. bringing in professionals seemingly to promote the company's name. The ground's opening match in September 1883 was a 4–2 win against Stoke.

However, the club was unlucky, in the second round of the FA Cup, to be drawn away to Preston North End, who had received even more funding for its team. Worse, Reuben Wilson, the Leverites' goalkeeper, was injured during the match, so the 10-man Great Lever went out by 4–1, in what was considered a shock result, as it was not yet apparent how good the Preston team was. The club arranged a return friendly at the Woodsides ground in the New Year; by this time Great Lever had persuaded three more players (Lucas, Walkinshaw, and John Goodall), who had played for Kilmarnock Athletic against the Leverites over Christmas, not to return home but to join Great Lever instead. Nevertheless, the Leverites lost to Preston before a crowd of 6,000, whose behaviour was such it was subject to an official inquiry.

The club got to the 4th round of the Lancashire Cup, but a reserve side lost 7–1 at Astley Bridge, the newcomers not allowed to play as "not having resided in the county sufficiently long". Nevertheless, the club finished the season boasting of having scored more goals than any other club.

=== Dispute with the FA and the club's peak ===
The club continued to recruit for 1884–85, resulting in an entire side of imported players. The side made Great Lever one of the top two or three sides in the country, with the first match of the season being an easy win over Cup holders Blackburn Rovers. The club followed this up with a 6–0 win over Derby County in the latter's first-ever match.

The club's other victims that year included some of the best in the country; 3–0 over West Bromwich Albion and Burnley, 4–0 over Stoke, 3–2 over Third Lanark on a tour of Scotland, 5-0 and 5–1 over Halliwell, 7–0 over Walsall Swifts, 3–1 over Aston Villa, and a draw against Preston North End. The only setback on the pitch was a defeat to Bolton Wanderers in the final of the Bolton Charity Cup.

Off the pitch however the club was embroiled in controversy between the Lancashire FA and the Football Association. Disputes over professionalism and the FA's new rules on providing details of player employment past and present, aimed squarely at "outing" the sham amateurs employed on fake wages, meant that Great Lever simply did not enter the FA Cup. The club could not legitimately play its leading players without facing protests so did not bother, instead focussing on friendlies.

The club was therefore one of the founder members of the British Football Association, and was put under an effective embargo on fixtures, along with other members such as Preston North End, Accrington, and Bolton Wanderers. The situation was only resolved at the end of the season, when the FA legalized professionalism, but by then the club had missed on its best chance to win the FA or Lancashire Cup. A reserve side played in the latter tournament and went out in the third round to Bolton Wanderers, who were able to play five of their first-teamers given the less stringent Lancashire FA rules on residence.

=== Post-professionalism ===
Paradoxically, the legalization of what Great Lever had been doing led to the decline of the club. With professionalism in the open, clubs no longer had to resort to the employment trick, and could be open with payments of players out of gate receipts. Although the Leverites could attract up to 6,000 for key matches, other clubs in the area could attract bigger crowds, and suddenly Great Lever were losing players to other clubs rather than poaching them; before the 1885–86 season started, two players went back to Scotland and, most crucially, the club lost John Goodall to Preston.

Even worse, the club got the worst possible draw in the first round of the FA Cup - Preston North End away. Preston had been recruiting professionals before Great Lever chronologically, and the North Enders had more players "grandfathered" in as being eligible to play. With the prospect of only being able to field a reserve side, Great Lever instead scratched from the competition, and played the scheduled tie out as a friendly match with a first-choice side; the game ended 3–2 to North End.

Amazingly enough, the situation repeated itself in the second round of the Lancashire Cup, as that competition applied no seeding. Great Lever again scratched to play an ordinary friendly, this time ending 2-2.

It was apparent that the club had already dropped from the previous season. Although the club beat a weak Blackburn Rovers side 6–2, it also lost 7–1 at Burnley, and 4–0 at Accrington; even a 1–0 win over a poor Darwen side ended in a fight between Lucas and the ex-Leverite Rostron.

=== A strike and the end ===
The financial difficulties caught up with the club with precipitous speed. For the 1886–87 season, the players available were entirely different to those available two seasons before, and included two players who had been with the club since before the quasi-professionalism. A home FA Cup tie with Cliftonville was considered a 'soft thing', especially as the Irish side only arrived at Woodsides on the morning of the match, having had little sleep after a storm on the Irish Sea, but the visitors won with ease.

The following week, the club turned up 90 minutes late for a match at Blackburn Olympic, despite the distance between the two grounds being around 20 miles; this suggests there was a deeper issue involved. It came to the boil when the club was due to play Padiham in the Lancashire Cup. The players refused to play, as they were being paid only out of gate money in excess of the club's expenses, and the gates had dwindled to a minimum.

At the start of the new year, the club's remaining players left for other clubs, including Bolton and Heywood Olympic. There was an attempt to re-form the club for 1887–88 by merging with Great Lever Wanderers, a junior club, but it was not successful; a 7–1 hammering by Heywood Central marked the end of the club. By 1888 everything, including the grandstand, and even the match balls, had been sold.

== Colours ==
The club played in the following colours:

- 1878-80: navy blue jersey & knickers, orange & blue hose
- 1880-81: orange and blue
- 1881-83: chocolate and green halves
- 1883-85: narrow red and white "stripes" (probably hoops)

The club's colours after 1885 are not recorded.

== Grounds ==
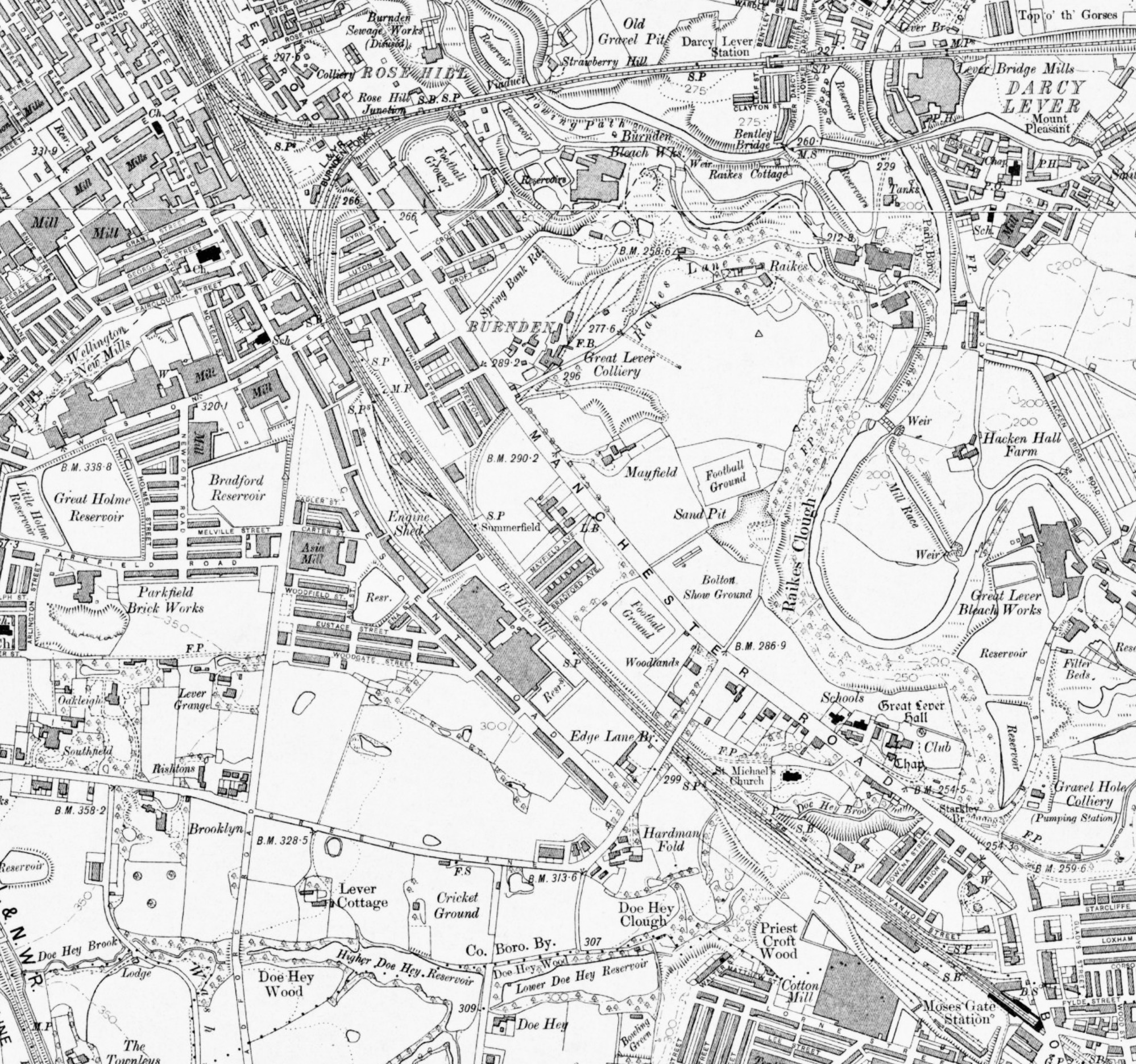
The location of the Woodsides ground, centre, between Manchester Road and the railway line, in relation to Burnden Park (top middle, below Rose Hill). Green Lane and the Doe Hey cricket ground are at the bottom.

The club's first ground was described as being on the Bradford Road, and in 1879-80 the club played at Doe Hay to the south-west of Great Lever, possibly at the cricket ground. In 1880-81 the club gave its ground as Green Lane, and from 1881 to 1883 as High Street (probably the recreation ground). In practice, the Green Lane and Doe Hey addresses may refer to the same ground.

In 1883 the club moved to a ground called Woodsides, to the east of Great Lever. The pitch had a reputation for being particularly poor. Bolton's Burnden Park ground was close to the Woodsides ground.

== FA Cup history ==
1882–83

- First Round – Defeated 3–2 by Halliwell

1883–84

- First Round – Won 4–1 v. Astley Bridge
- Second Round – Defeated 4–1 by Preston North End

1885–86

- First Round – eliminated in walkover by Preston North End

1886–87

- First Round – Won 4–2 v Bootle
- Second Round – Defeated 3–1 by Cliftonville.

== Famous players ==
- Alf Jones made one appearance for England in March 1883, whilst registered to Great Lever, having previously made two England appearances when with Walsall Swifts.
- Thurston Rostron played for Great Lever during the 1883–84 season, having previously made two England appearances when with Darwen.
- John Goodall played for Great Lever, before joining Preston North End in 1885. He went on to make 14 appearances for England between 1888 and 1898.
- Albert Shepherd went on to play for Bolton Wanderers and Newcastle United.
- Dennis Hodgetts played League football for Aston Villa after playing for Great Lever.
- James Trainer b. Wrexham Played for Wrexham and then Great Lever
- Jack Switherby, first-ever captain for the United States national side, who played for the club until 1884
