= 1882–83 FA Cup =

Tournament details
- Country: England; Wales; Scotland
- Teams: 84

Final positions
- Champions: Blackburn Olympic
- Runners-up: Old Etonians

The 1882–83 Football Association Challenge Cup was the 12th staging of the FA Cup, England's oldest football tournament. Eighty-four teams entered, eleven more than the previous season, although five of the eighty-four never played a match.

== First round ==
Home club	Score	Away club	Date
Darwen	4–1	Blackburn Park Road	21 October 1882
Reading	Bye		
Barnes	2–4	Brentwood	28 October 1882
Royal Engineers	3–1	Woodford Bridge	21 October 1882
Maidenhead	0–2	Old Westminsters	4 November 1882
Clapham Rovers	3–0	Kildare	4 November 1882
Upton Park	Bye		
Windsor	3–0	Acton	4 November 1882
Old Etonians	1–1	Old Foresters	4 November 1882
Swifts	4–1	Union	4 November 1882
Rochester	2–0	Hotspur	4 November 1882
Druids (Wales)	1–1	Oswestry	4 November 1882
Notts County	6–1	Sheffield	4 November 1882
Nottingham Forest	Walkover	Brigg Britannia	
West End	1–3	Hendon	4 November 1882
Blackburn Rovers	11–1	Blackpool St John's	23 October 1882
Hanover United	1–0	Mosquitoes	4 November 1882
Aston Villa	4–1	Walsall Swifts	21 October 1882
Old Carthusians	6–0	Pilgrims	21 October 1882
Sheffield Wednesday	12–2	Spilsby	4 November 1882
Blackburn Olympic	6–3	Accrington	4 November 1882
Reading Minster	Walkover	Remnants	
Dreadnought	1–2 Match void	South Reading	21 October 1882
St George's	5–1	Calthorpe	28 October 1882
Small Heath Alliance	3–3	Stafford Road	11 November 1882
Sheffield Heeley	Bye		
Bolton Wanderers	6–1	Bootle	4 November 1882
Lockwood Brothers	4–3	Macclesfield Town	4 November 1882
Darwen Ramblers	5–2	South Shore	14 October 1882
Chatham	Bye		
Grimsby Town	Walkover	Queen's Park (Scotland)	
Walsall Town	4–1	Staveley	21 October 1882
Northwich Victoria	3–2	Astley Bridge	28 October 1882
Eton Ramblers	6–2	Romford	21 October 1882
Hornchurch	0–2	Marlow	28 October 1882
Church	5–0	Clitheroe	2 September 1882
Chesterfield Spital	1–7	Wednesbury Old Athletic	4 November 1882
Bolton Olympic	4–7	Eagley	4 November 1882
Aston Unity	Bye		
Irwell Springs	2–5	Lower Darwen	28 October 1882
Great Lever	2–3	Halliwell	21 October 1882
Phoenix Bessemer	Walkover	Grantham	
United Hospitals	3–0	London Olympic	4 November 1882
Haslingden Association	Bye		
Liverpool Ramblers	1–1	Southport	21 October 1882

=== Replays ===
Home club	Score	Away club	Date
Old Etonians	3–1	Old Foresters	18 November 1882
Oswestry	0–2	Druids (Wales)	18 November 1882
Dreadnought	1–2	South Reading	4 November 1882
Stafford Road	6–2	Small Heath Alliance	18 November 1882
Southport	0–4	Liverpool Ramblers	4 November 1882

== Second round ==
Home club	Score	Away club	Date
Darwen	1–0	Blackburn Rovers	2 December 1882
Royal Engineers	8–0	Reading	29 November 1882
Marlow	Walkover	Reading Minster	
Clapham Rovers	7–1	Hanover United	2 December 1882
Windsor	3–1	United Hospital	30 November 1882
Old Etonians	2–1	Brentwood	2 December 1882
Swifts	2–2	Upton Park	30 November 1882
Rochester	Bye		
Druids (Wales)	5–0	Northwich Victoria	9 December 1882
Notts County	Bye		
Hendon	2–1	Chatham	2 December 1882
Nottingham Forest	7–2	Sheffield Heeley	2 December 1882
Eagley	3–1	Halliwell	2 December 1882
Aston Villa	4–1	Wednesbury Old Athletic	18 November 1882
Old Carthusians	7–0	Etonian Ramblers	2 December 1882
Sheffield Wednesday	6–0	Lockwood Brothers	2 December 1882
Blackburn Olympic	8–1	Lower Darwen	9 December 1882
Bolton Wanderers	3–0	Liverpool Ramblers	2 December 1882
Darwen Ramblers	3–2	Haslingden Association	2 December 1882
Grimsby Town	1–8	Phoenix Bessemer	25 November 1882
Walsall Town	4–1	Stafford Road	2 December 1882
Church	Bye		
Aston Unity	3–1	St George's	2 December 1882
South Reading	Bye		
Old Westminsters	Bye		

=== Replay ===
Home club	Score	Away club	Date
Swifts	3–2	Upton Park	2 December 1882

== Third round ==
Home club	Score	Away club	Date
Royal Engineers	Bye		
Marlow	Bye		
Windsor	0–3	Clapham Rovers	6 January 1883
Old Etonians	7–0	Rochester	16 December 1882
Swifts	Bye		
Druids (Wales)	0–0	Bolton Wanderers	6 January 1883
Notts County	4–1	Phoenix Bessemer	27 December 1882
Hendon	11–1	South Reading	6 January 1883
Nottingham Forest	2–2	Sheffield Wednesday	6 January 1883
Eagley	Bye		
Aston Villa	3–1	Aston Unity	6 January 1883
Old Carthusians	3–2	Old Westminsters	16 December 1882
Blackburn Olympic	8–0	Darwen Ramblers	16 December 1882
Walsall Town	Bye		
Church	2–2	Darwen	6 January 1883

=== Replays ===
Home club	Score	Away club	Date
Bolton Wanderers	1–1	Druids (Wales)	22 January 1883
Druids (Wales)	1–0	Bolton Wanderers	29 January 1883
Sheffield Wednesday	3–2	Nottingham Forest	13 January 1883
Darwen	0–2	Church	20 January 1883

== Fourth round ==
Home club	Score	Away club	Date
Marlow	0–3	Hendon	3 February 1883
Clapham Rovers	Bye		
Old Etonians	2–0	Swifts	24 January 1883
Eagley	1–2	Druids (Wales)	10 February 1883
Aston Villa	2–1	Walsall Town	27 January 1883
Old Carthusians	6–2	Royal Engineers	25 January 1883
Sheffield Wednesday	1–4	Notts County	12 February 1883
Blackburn Olympic	2–0	Church	3 February 1883

== Fifth round ==
Home club	Score	Away club	Date
Notts County	4–3	Aston Villa	3 March 1883
Hendon	2–4	Old Etonians	3 March 1883
Old Carthusians	5–3	Clapham Rovers	20 February 1883
Blackburn Olympic	4–1	Druids (Wales)	24 February 1883

== Semi finals ==
Home club	Score	Away club	Date
Old Etonians	2–1	Notts County	17 March 1883
Blackburn Olympic	4–0	Old Carthusians	17 March 1883

== Final ==
Home club	Score	Away club	Date
Blackburn Olympic	2–1	Old Etonians	31 March 1883
