= Darwen Ramblers F.C. =

Darwen Ramblers
- Full name: Darwen Ramblers Football Club
- Nickname: the Ramblers
- Founded: 1877?
- Dissolved: 1886
- Ground: Anchor Meadows
- Secretary: John Earle

Darwen Ramblers FC was an English association football club based in Darwen, Lancashire.

== History ==
The club was originally called Hill-Houses and its first recorded match was against the Black Prince club of Little Harwood in December 1878; by this time the club had enough members for a second team which played the Black Prince reserves.

By 1881 the club had changed its name to Darwen Ramblers and rose in prominence in Lancashire, being considered one of the rising sides in Darwen; however there was competition from other sides such as Darwen itself, Lower Darwen, and Lower Chapel, all of whom had, unlike the Ramblers, entered the Lancashire Senior Cup. The Ramblers entered the competition for its third instalment, being drawn against Irwell Springs in the first round, and surprisingly losing 6–3 having been 3–0 up.

Paradoxically the club had more success in the FA Cup than the Lancashire Cup; in 1882–83 the club beat South Shore and Haslingden Association to reach the third round of the FA Cup, where they lost to the eventual winners Blackburn Olympic, but in the Lancashire Cup they lost 4–3 at Padiham, having been 2–0 and 3–1 up. The Ramblers protested the result on the basis that the winning goal came three minutes after the referee should have called for time; the protest was not successful.

That season however marked the only wins in the FA Cup for the Ramblers. Their entries in the next two years saw them eliminated in the first round, although they were unlucky in 1883–84 to be drawn against the holders. The 1883 game against Olympic was the first of that season's competition to be played, as Olympic offered Ramblers £10 and a return fixture to move the fixture up in the calendar, so that the Olympic players would be Cup-tied for the season. However the Ramblers were not attractive opponents and the crowd was a mere 400.

The club remained prominent on the local scene in 1882–83 and 1883–84, including Preston North End among their opponents, and sent a representative to the Football Association AGM in 1883. The club also finally won a tie in the Lancashire Cup, beating Blackburn West End in the first round in 1883–84, but a sign of the distance between the club and the professionals was demonstrated when they lost 4–0 in the second round to a Blackburn Olympic reserve side, as the Light Blues' first team was on a Scottish tour, playing Edinburgh University F.C. on the day of the tie.

=== Demise ===
By 1885–86, very few of the club's fixtures were attracting media attention. The last recorded competitive fixture was a 4–1 defeat at Wigan A.F.C. in the Lancashire Senior Cup, as, "through an error", the club did not enter the 1885–86 FA Cup. The club did not pay its subscription to the Lancashire FA for the 1886–87 season and seems to have been wound up. A club with the same name was started up in the 1888–89 season.

== Ground ==
The club played at Hill Houses, from which it took its original name. The ground was reckoned to be "fairly level, but is far trom being a good one, owing to the "rutts", which are both numerous and deep, and render accurate passing and shooting exceptionally hard. The approach to the ground is very steep, and rather unique in its way, and this in itself is quite enough to render the taking of a good gate improbable even under the most favourable circumstances."

== Notable players ==
- Sam Fish, future Darwen captain
- James Kenyon, future Darwen player
