= Lower Chapel F.C. =

English association football club

- Nickname: the Chapelites
- Founded: 1877
- Dissolved: 1881
- Ground: Knowl Meadows, Eccleshill
- Secretary: J. H. Leach
Home colours

Lower Chapel F.C. (sometimes referred to as Darwen Lower Chapel or Lower Chapel (Darwen)) was an association football club from Darwen, Lancashire.

== History ==
The club's first notoriety came in a charity tournament in Blackburn held to raise money for a local hospital. The Chapelites took the competition so seriously that, after two draws with the St Alban's club, it brought in three "ringers" from the Darwen second XI, who imbued the side with "back-charging, tripping, disobedience to the umpire", and its following declared to be "rude, boisterous, and generally unbecoming". The club eventually reached the final, but lost 2–0 to Blackburn St Mark's, the club's runner-up prize being a football.

It never entered the FA Cup, but it did enter the first two editions of the Lancashire Senior Cup, in 1879–80 and 1880–81; at the time, the Senior Cup was the most competitive competition for local clubs to enter, as only four Lancashire clubs entered the 1879–80 FA Cup, as opposed to 40 in the Lancashire. In the first competition, Lower Chapel won through to the fourth round, its second round tie with Lynwood being particularly looked forward to, as the clubs were considered to be vying for second place in the town's clubs, after Darwen itself; Lower Chapel won twice, the first result being annulled after a protest that the goals were too low.

The highlight of the run was an 8–2 hammering of Eagley, one of the FA Cup entrants, the result considered "the greatest turn-up of the competition". The domination was so comprehensive that, with the score at 5–1, Eagley's captain and goalkeeper Mangnall exchanged places with centre-forward Smith. At the fourth round stage - which, owing to a lopsided draw, was made up of 5 sides, so effectively a semi-final - Lower Chapel narrowly lost 4–3 at Accrington. The Chapelites protested one of the Accrington goals, which had only been allowed on appeal to the referee, but the appeal was unsuccessful; notably, Lower Darwen did not nominate an umpire for the tie.

The club's time near the top of Lancashire football was brief. The club's first round Senior Cup tie in 1880–81 with Blackburn Olympic ended in a 3–3 draw; Lower Chapel claimed to have won the replay at the Hole i'the Wall Ground, claiming a late winner from a scrimmage. However the umpires could not agree the decision, and the referee "was some distance away", with the game ending in confusion. The Lancashire FA ordered a second replay on neutral territory at Turton, but Lower Chapel claimed the right to be put through to the next round, threatening to quit the Lancashire FA if it was not. Eventually the Lancashire FA agreed with Lower Chapel, and put the club through to face Eagley at home, a match the Chapelites considered to be close to a walkover. However, Eagley won the toss, and played with a heavy wind in its favour, turning around with a four goal lead. A tired Lower Chapel side spent most of the second half pressing the Eagley defence, but only scored once - and then got caught with a sucker punch counter-attack at the game's death.

The defeat seems to have put the club off from competing again, as there is no sign of the club afterwards; indeed, only one of its regular players, J. Whiteside, is noted to have played at any competitive level, for Darwen from 1882 to 1884.

== Colours ==
The club wore red and white jerseys and hose, with white knickers.

== Ground ==
The club played at Knowl Meadows in Eccleshill, and used the Lower Chapel school for facilities. The ground was also known as the Knowle [sic] Height. It was "almost on a line with the Darwen Moor" and usually affected by a heavy wind.

== Notable players ==
One of the club's centre-forwards, William Lightbown (or Lightbourn), a cotton-weaver, played for the Lancashire representative XI in a "mini-international" against the North Wales representative side in March 1880.
