= Stanley F.C. (Liverpool) =

Football club in Liverpool, England

Stanley
- Full name: Stanley Football Club
- Nicknames: the Light Blues, the Stiles
- Founded: 1882
- Dissolved: 1896
- Ground: Walton Stiles
Home colours

Stanley F.C., often referred to from 1887 to 1890 as Liverpool Stanley, was an English association football club, from Liverpool in Merseyside.

== History ==
The club was founded in 1882 by cricketers from the Stanley Cricket Club, who played their early matches in Stanley Park in Liverpool. The club optimistically entered the Lancashire Senior Cup straight after foundation, but lost by a competition record score of 23–0 to Witton F.C. of Blackburn.

The club struggled to gain support because of earlier clubs in the city, such as Everton, Liverpool Ramblers, and Bootle. One way in which it attracted players, in an era in which professionalism was banned, was for the club's backers to provide employment; many of the players brought in to play for Stanley worked at the United Grain Elevating Company in Bootle. Certainly by 1886 the club had enough members to field three teams on the same day; a measure of the times is that in that era the third team was good enough to face Tranmere Rovers.

However, while the club could attract 2,000 fans when hosting Everton, more regular matches only brought in a "poor attendance". The club's one match in the main section of the FA Cup, in 1887–88, a 5–1 defeat at home to Halliwell (having reached half-time 1–0 up), only attracted a crowd of 1,000. On the same day, Bootle were hosting a crowd of 3,000 against Workington.

=== Liverpool Senior Cup final ===
The club's best run in the Liverpool Senior Cup came in 1887–88, the expulsion of Everton for breaches of residency rules removing much of the interest from the competition. The original semi-final tie (the club's fifth appearance at that stage) against Tranmere ended in a draw, before a crowd of only 400; Stanley played the second half with ten men after Goodall left the pitch in protest at the refereeing, which saw three goals disallowed for Stanley. Stanley won the replay 9–1, Goodall scoring a hat-trick, perhaps justifying the criticism of the refereeing.

The club suffered a curious incident shortly before the final when the club's goalkeeper, M'Allum (a Scots import), attacked an opponent (George) during a match, to such an extent that he was prosecuted before magistrates, and fined £1 plus costs. It was a particularly ill-judged action given the club's opponents were the Liverpool Police Athletic Club.

The lack of support the club was attracting was demonstrated by the attendance at the final. Three weeks before, 3,000 people saw Bootle play a friendly against Halliwell; however only 500 saw Bootle play Stanley in the final, at the athletic grounds in Fairfield. Bootle took the lead in the first minute, without a Stanley player touching the ball, and Stanley finished the game with nine men; Wright being forced off injured after a collision with Bootle goalkeeper Jackson, when 2–0 down, and William Brown sent off for jumping at Allsop "in a very ugly fashion" in the final minute, after Bootle had scored their third and final goal.

=== Local leagues ===
In 1888–89, the club reached the third round of the FA Cup qualifying competition, but was drawn to play Cliftonveille of Belfast away, and, rather than incur the costs, the club scratched the tie and played a friendly against Bootle instead.

The club never reached as far in the Cup again, losing 12–0 at Ardwick in the first qualifying round two seasons later.

The formation of the Football League, and later Liverpool F.C. and Liverpool Caledonians, all proved serious blows to the club's hopes of being competitive. The club was a founder member of the Lancashire Combination in 1891–92, but only won once in 14 matches, and left the league at the end of the season, instead joining the Liverpool District League, which, in 1895–96, merged with the Wirral League to form the Liverpool & Wirral League. Even this proved to be too strong for the club, and the club retired from the League early in the 1895–96 season, after its last Cup tie (a defeat to Northwich Victoria). A charity match in April 1896 was meant to generate some income for the club, but it appears to have been used only to clear debts, and the club did not emerge for the following season; instead it offered Walton Stiles for rent and for the 1897–98 season Everton took the ground over for its amateur side.

== Colours ==
The club's colours were listed as blue and white, and the media often referred to the club as the Light Blues, although at least one correspondent considered the "sky blue" jerseys to be " most hideous".

== Ground ==
Unable to charge admission fees for matches in Stanley Park, in 1885 the club used the proceeds from a Liverpool Senior Cup tie against Everton at Anfield to build an enclosure at Walton Stiles and set up a new home there. The club's first match at their new ground was against Darwen at the start of the 1885–86 season.

== Notable players ==
- Alec Dick, Archie Goodall, William Brown, Charles McGoldrick - future Evertonians.
