= Stanley F.C. =

Stanley F.C. may refer to:

- Accrington Stanley F.C., an English association football club from Lancashire
- Accrington Stanley F.C. (1891), a defunct English association football club from Lancashire
- Stanley F.C. (Liverpool), an English association football team from the 1880s
- Stanley F.C. (Perthshire), a Scottish association football team which existed from 1890 to 1950
- Stanley F.C., original name of Newcastle East End F.C., renamed to Newcastle United F.C. in 1892
- Falkland Islands official football team, nicknamed Stanley, an association football team from the Falkland Islands
