= 1881–82 Bolton Wanderers F.C. season =

Bolton Wanderers
1881–82 season
- Secretary: Tom Rawthorne
- FA Cup: Second round
- Top goalscorer: League: All: W.G. Struthers
Home colours

The 1881–82 season was the first season in which Bolton Wanderers competed in a senior competitive football competition. The club entered the FA Cup in October 1881, but were knocked out in the second round by Blackburn Rovers.

== F.A. Cup ==
Date	Round	Opponents	H / A	Result F–A	Scorers
22 October 1881	Round 1	Eagley	H	5–5	Atherton, Gleaves, Struthers, Own Goals (2)
12 November 1881	Round 1 Replay	Eagley	A	1–0	R. Steel
19 November 1881	Round 2	Blackburn Rovers	A	2–6	Atherton, Struthers
