= Enfield F.C. (Accrington) =

Former association football club in Lancashire

- Full name: Enfield Football Club
- Founded: 1877
- Dissolved: 1884
- Ground: Enfield Cricket Ground
- Secretary: W. T. Sumner
Home colours

Enfield Football Club was an association football club from Accrington, Lancashire.

== History ==
The club was formed in 1877 out of the Enfield Cricket Club as a winter sporting activity, and was the first club in Accrington to play to association laws. It played in the first Lancashire Senior Cup in 1879–80, but was unlucky to be drawn against Blackburn Rovers, at the time one of the strongest sides in the country, but managed to hold Rovers to a draw, and a 5–1 replay defeat was no disgrace. The club made a small profit of £3 over the season, thanks to a boost in membership to 164.

The 1880–81 season proved to be the club's best, as it reached the semi-finals of Senior Cup, culminating in a quarter-final win over Eagley, by now a regular FA Cup entrant. At the semi-final stage Enfield went down 3–0 to eventual winner (and town rival) Accrington, in front of over 2,000 at the Accrington Cricket Ground.

This raised the club's status enough that it could open its 1881–82 season with a friendly against future FA Cup winners Blackburn Olympic; the difference in standard was such that the visitors won 9–2, the report suggesting Enfield tended to panic and follow the ball, leaving the Light Blues attackers unmarked. Enfield learned the lessons of the match, as in the third round of the Senior Cup, the clubs met again, and this time Enfield held the Olympians to a draw at the Hole i'the Wall ground; Hanson scored a late equalizer for Enfield, who then pressed the Olympians' goal for the remainder of the match, but could not pull off the shock result. Olympic handily won the replay, and an Enfield protest that Olympic had fielded an ineligible player (Harry Sharples), but the protest was dismissed.

Gradually, its better players started to join other clubs (full-back Pickup to Blackburn Park Road and half-back Ramsbottom to Turton), and for a prestigious match at Accrington at Christmas 1882, Enfield could only muster 10 men. Its last recorded match of any note was a 3–1 home defeat to Turton in the third round of the 1883–84 Senior Cup, and its remaining players drifted from the association game, although many (including Pickup, Ramsbottom, and Hanson) continued with the cricket side. The final recorded match was a 4–1 win at the original Blackpool F.C. in April 1884, but Blackpool had rested many of its players, as straight after the Enfield game, Blackpool was facing the Vale of Leven.

== Colours ==
The club wore navy jerseys, originally with white knickers and navy hose; in 1880 the club changed its hose to white.

== Ground ==
The club played at the Enfield Cricket Ground, one and a half miles from Accrington railway station and Rishton railway station.
