= Hull Town F.C. =

Football club in Yorkshire, England

Hull Town
- Full name: Hull Town Football Club
- Founded: 1879
- Dissolved: 1889
- Ground: Argyle Street
- Secretary: John H. Walker, H. Hudson
Home colours

Hull Town F.C. was an English association football club from Kingston upon Hull in Yorkshire.

== History ==
In 1879, at the Crown & Cushion Hotel in Hull, members of the Hull Cricket Club agreed to form an association football section to keep the players fit during the winter season.

Hitherto, Kingston upon Hull had been a rugby town; Hull FC had played a handful of association matches in the 1860s, but otherwise all football in the town was to the oval ball code. Hull Town was the first dedicated association football club in Hull and by the start of its second season the club had 96 members.

Within a couple of years the town had other clubs, and the Scarborough & East Riding Cup final in 1882–83 was played between two of them, Hull losing to Blue Star. In 1883–84 Hull Town merged with Blue Star and the Dairycoates club, and moved to the latter's ground.

Town entered the FA Cup for the first time in 1883–84, losing 3–1 at home to Grimsby Town in the first round. In the 1884–85 FA Cup, Town again lost at home in the first round, this time to Lincoln City, by a score variously reported as being 5–1 or 5–2, having been ahead at half-time.

After a series of dispiriting defeats, the club disbanded in 1887. It was reformed a year later but dissolved again at the end of the season.

The name Hull Town was revived in 1896 for a club founded by the rugby side Hull Kingston Rovers, who merged with the Albany club for the purposes of fielding an association football side. The new club reached the final of both the Scarborough & East Riding and Hull Times cups in 1897, but disappeared in 1898 with other clubs taking on the association mantle.

== Colours ==
The club wore amber and black, the colours taken from the coat of arms of the Barons Strabolgi, which had close links with Hull.

== Ground ==
The club originally played at the cricket ground in Argyle Street, in Dairycoates. In 1883 it moved to the Dairycoates club's ground at Hessle Street.
