= Witton F.C. =

Witton
- Full name: Witton Association Football Club
- Nickname: the Universal Providers
- Founded: 1874
- Dissolved: 1892
- Ground: Redlam Brow
- Chairman: John Hartley
- Manager: Enoch Rigby
Home colours

Witton Football Club was a football club from Blackburn in Lancashire.

== History ==
The club was founded in 1874 as a footballing branch of the St Mark's Cricket Club. It originally played under the name St Mark's in Pleasington, to the west of the town. The club changed its name and ground before the 1880–81 season.

The first reported matches for the club are from October 1876. The club was a founder member of the Lancashire Football Association and took part in the first Lancashire Senior Cup in 1879–80. The club had already reached its first Cup final, the Livesey United Cup, in 1878, losing to Blackburn Olympic in the final. The first success for the club was in April 1879, winning a competition set up to raise funds for local hospitals, by beating Darwen Lower Chapel 2–0 in the final, receiving as a prize a set of goalposts, crossbar, boundary poles, and flags.

Witton first became a club of note on the local scene in 1881–82, reaching the Lancashire Cup semi-final, beating Padiham, Darwen St John's, and Turton, before losing to Accrington; the club gained a small measure of revenge by beating the Owd Reds in a friendly in the club's final game of the season. In 1882–83, the club set a world competitive record by beating the newly-founded Liverpool club Stanley in the first round of the Lancashire Cup by 23 goals to 0, Lomax scoring six and Snape 5.

The club first entered the FA Cup in 1884–85, reaching the third round thanks to one withdrawal and one bye; the club's luck ran out when drawn away to Blackburn Rovers in the latter's run of three consecutive triumphs. In the circumstances it was no disgrace to lose 5–1, a claim for a sixth goal being withdrawn by the Rovers after the referee had granted it.

=== Professionalism ===
Witton made the decision to turn professional in 1887–88, after losing to Preston North End in the FA Cup (by 6–0) and Lancashire Cup (by 12–0). The club recruited 19 professionals for the new season, and had its best run in both competitions.

In the FA Cup, Witton beat Oswaldtwistle Rovers in the first round, 4–3, the week after beating the Rovers 4–1 in a friendly match "with a moderate team". The Wittonians' Cup tie display was affected by an accident to the wagonette taking them to Oswaldtwistle, costing them the services of John Grimshaw and John T. Barker for the match. J. A. Pickup could not finish the match, having suffered a kick serious enough to keep him out of the second round tie; this took place in northern Ireland, as the club was drawn away to Distillery, and won 4–2. The club's run ended in a third round replay at home to Darwen, the sides having drawn at Barley Bank, and nearly 6,000 turning up to Witton Park for the second game. The game was "unusually exciting" and was held up for ten minutes after a fight between Hothersall of Witton and Thurnber of Darwen provoked a pitch invasion.

In the Lancashire Cup, the club reached the semi-final, and held Accrington to a draw before going down in the replay. The final did not take place. The Lancashire FA arranged for it to be played in Blackburn, and the other finalists, Preston North End, demanded a change in venue, "on account of the feeling between Blackburn [Rovers] and Preston". As the Lancashire FA refused to move the match, Preston withdrew from the Lancashire FA, and Accrington were told to turn up for the match, kick the ball into the empty goal, and claim the match; for the benefit of the spectators, Witton were invited to play a friendly match against the Owd Reds. However, in order to award the silver medallists for the runners-up, the Lancashire FA arranged a match between Witton and the other semi-finalist losers, Darwen Old Wanderers, at Darwen F.C.'s Barley Bank ground, which Witton won 2–0. In a portent for the future of the game, Witton were without two of their key players (Haresnape and Almond), as both had already agreed to play League football for Blackburn Rovers.

=== Searching for a League ===
Although the club's performances exempted them from qualifying for the 1888–89 FA Cup main draw, it was not invited to join the Football League, as only one club per town was allowed in. On 27 April 1888, at the Royal Hotel, Crewe, representatives of 12 clubs that had missed out on the League - including Witton - met with the view of forming an alternative competition, to be called the Football Combination. However, by June 1888, Witton had resigned, replaced by South Shore, apparently because Witton considered it a second-rate competition and unworthy of the club.

It proved a disastrous decision. Although the Combination proved to be a failure, many of its clubs agreed to form the Football Alliance in its wake. Witton had spent the 1888–89 season mostly playing friendlies away from home, and, although the club only narrowly lost to Aston Villa in the FA Cup, it was on the wrong end of double digit defeats to Everton, Darwen, and Preston North End. Witton's application therefore to join the Alliance was not from a position of strength, and the club was not elected. The club had a second chance after Sunderland A.F.C. decided not to proceed with its membership. Six clubs applied for the vacant spot, and Witton tied in votes with Long Eaton Rangers. The casting vote of the chairman (Harry Mitchell of Mitchell St George's) was in favour of the Rangers.

The club had incurred a debt of £45 before the start of the 1889 season, which was wiped out by the club hosting a sports day. It lost its one FA Cup tie in 1889–90, to South Shore in a qualifying round, and in 1890–91 finally joined a league - the revived Combination, featuring some of the clubs that had taken part in the original, plus some other more marginal sides from the north. By this time, Witton was consigned to the East Lancashire Charity Shield competition, for junior teams, rather than the Cup, for seniors. Even that one Combination season proved a disaster as the club could not fulfil its fixtures and resigned. Witton finally joined the Lancashire League for 1891–92, finished bottom but one, and was suspended for non-payment of a debt of 30 shillings. The club seems to have ceased playing football after this, as it did not enter the FA Cup after 1891–92, and was suspended by the Football Association in April 1892 for non-payment of a 30 shilling debt, although it arranged sports days at Witton Park for the next few years.

== Grounds ==
The original St Mark's ground was the cricket pitch in Pleasington. By 1881 the club was playing in Redlam Brow, near the town centre. The club appears to have played some of its bigger matches at Witton Park, between Blackburn and Pleasington.

== Colours ==
The first colours attributed to the club are white jerseys, blue knickers with a white stripe, and blue stockings, for 1878–79. The next season the club had changed jerseys to black and white "quarters" (or halves, in today's parlance), but kept the knickers and stockings. In 1882 the club changed to blue and white, confirmed as being dark blue in 1889, with blue knickers.

== Nickname ==
The club was dubbed "the Universal Providers" from its susceptibility to having its players poached by the bigger clubs in Lancashire.

== Notable players ==
- Willie Almond and Robert Haresnape, joined Blackburn Rovers in 1888–89
- Jimmy Forrest, who left Witton for Blackburn Rovers in 1883, with whom he won three FA Cup winners' medals
