= Phoenix Bessemer F.C. =

Phoenix Bessemer
- Full name: Phoenix Bessemer Cricket and Football Club
- Founded: 1876
- Dissolved: 1885
- Ground: The Ickles
- Secretary: R. Pinner, F. W. Thomas, C. E. Thomas
Home colours

Phoenix Bessemer Football Club was an English association football club based in the large town of Rotherham, South Yorkshire, England.

== History ==
The club was in origin the works outfit of the Phoenix Bessemer steel company (formerly Messrs Steel, Tozer, and Hampton), spun out of the cricket club, and claimed a foundation date of 1876. The club started playing under Sheffield Rules, although by 1876 they were nearly indistinguishable from the association football laws.

The club entered the FA Cup in 1882. Its 8–1 win over Grimsby Town during that seasons FA Cup competition is still its opponent's record defeat.

The club did not enter the FA Cup after 1883, although it remained a member of the Football Association until 1885.

== Colours ==
The club played in navy blue.

== Ground ==
The club's ground was originally at the Ickles, near Rotherham. By 1882 the club had moved to a ground on Clifton Lane in the town itself.

== League and cup history ==
Phoenix Bessemer League and Cup history
| Season | FA Cup |
|---|---|
| 1882–83 | 3rd Round |

== Records ==
- Best FA Cup performance: 3rd Round, 1882–83
