= Alec Dick (footballer) =

Scottish footballer

Personal information
- Full name: Alexander Dick
- Date of birth: 1865
- Place of birth: Kilmarnock, Scotland
- Date of death: 1925 (aged 59–60)
- Position: Full back

Senior career*
Years	Team	Apps	(Gls)
1884–1885	Kilmarnock Athletic		
1885–1886	Stanley		
1886–1889	Everton	9	(0)
- * Club domestic league appearances and goals

Alexander Dick (1865 – 1925) was a Scottish footballer who played in the Football League for Everton.

== Background ==
Dick was signed by a local club, Kilmarnock Athletic in 1884. He then moved south to England and signed for Liverpool club Stanley F.C. in 1885. He was discovered by Everton and signed by them in August 1886. Before the Football League era he played 81 times for Everton. He made his FA Cup debut against Bolton Wanderers in October 1887. Dick was the first Scottish professional signed by Everton; he was a combative full–back who looked like becoming the established right-back for the club during the inaugural Football League season, but was suspended for a large part of the campaign after striking an opponent at Notts County.

== Season 1888–89 ==
Dick made his League debut on 8 September 1888, playing as a full–back, at Anfield, the then home of Everton. The home team defeated the visitors, Accrington 2–1. He appeared in nine of the 22 League games played by Everton in season 1888–89.

== After football ==
Dick was not retained for the 1889–90 season and left the club in April 1889. He never played top-flight football again. He died in 1925 at the age 49 or 50.
