= Tom Clinch =

English footballer

Personal information
- Full name: Thomas Clinch
- Date of birth: 26 July 1874
- Place of birth: Ashton-under-Lyne, England
- Date of death: 1953 (aged 70–71)
- Position: Full back

Senior career*
Years	Team	Apps	(Gls)
1896–1897	Chorley		
1897–1898	Nelson		
1898–1899	Halliwell Rovers		
1899–1900	Sheffield United	6	(0)
1900–1904	Reading		
1904–1905	Notts County	9	(0)
Total		15	(0)
- * Club domestic league appearances and goals

Thomas Clinch (26 July 1874 – 1956) was an English footballer who played in the Football League for Notts County and Sheffield United.
