= Astley Bridge F.C. =

English association football club

Astley Bridge
- Full name: Astley Bridge Football Club
- Nicknames: the Bridgers, Bridgeites
- Founded: 1875
- Dissolved: 1889
- Ground: Astley Meadow
1879–82 colours	1883–86 colours

Astley Bridge F.C. was an English association football club from Astley Bridge, near Bolton.

== History ==
The club was founded in 1877. In 1878 the club was a founder member of the Lancashire Football Association and it played in the 1879–80 Lancashire Senior Cup, the first instalment of the competition, reaching the third round.

The club first entered the FA Cup in 1880–81, beating Eagley at home in the first round in front of a "large attendance", but losing to Turton in the second. The next year the club went out again to Turton, this time in the first round, but after three replays.

On 14 October 1882, the Bridgeites visited Turf Moor in the Lancashire Senior Cup as the first opponents for Burnley in competitive football, winning 8–0.

The club continued to enter the FA and Lancashire Senior Cups until 1888–89, when the club was forced to start in the national competition qualifying rounds. The club's only other win in the FA Cup was against Southport Central in 1885–86, which was followed by the club's record defeat in the competition, 11–3 against Preston North End in front of 1,500 spectators. That year, Astley Bridge loaned a player (Sculthorpe) to Halliwell, who played in a friendly against Aston Villa; because the Football Association had not given permission, both Sculthorpe and Halliwell were briefly suspended.

In both 1886–87 and 1887–88 the club made it through to the second round on a forfeit. In the former year, the club drew twice with Burnley, but Burnley was disqualified for fielding a professional player before the second replay; Burnley was unable to field a full-strength side in the first two matches as many of its first choice players had not fulfilled the residency requirements for the competition. In the latter year, the club unexpectedly lost at Hurst before a crowd of 3,000, but the club put in a protest and the FA ordered a replay. Hurst "scratched rather than replay a match that they claimed to have fairly won" and Astley Bridge was awarded the tie.

In the second round, a crowd of 2,000 saw the Bridgeites lose to Halliwell, and put in another protest, on the basis that one player (Hewitson) was not qualified to play for Halliwell. Halliwell attended the hearing with Hewitson's birth certificate, the FA dismissed the protest, and ordered Astley Bridge to pay 2 guineas and Halliwell's expenses.

The Bridgeites' best run in the Senior Cup came in 1883–84, when four wins - including a 7–1 hammering of Great Lever, shorn of its "imported" stars who were not eligible for the competition - took the club into the final six; it missed out on a semi-final (and possibly a final) place when it went down to Witton in a replay.

The last records of the club are from the 1888–89 season, with the ground being made available to rent from 1890. A replacement club (Astley Bridge Wanderers) was in existence before the 1892–93 season and a later club was in the Lancashire Combination in the early 1950s.

== Colours ==
From the Charles Alcock yearbooks
Year	Colours
1879	Navy blue jersey, white knickers, navy blue hose
1880	Navy blue jersey, white knickers, navy blue hose
1881	Navy blue
1882	Navy blue & white jerseys
1883	Orange & blue
1884	Orange & blue
1885	Orange & blue "quarters"
1886	Crimson & green

== Grounds ==
The club originally played at a ground on Sweetloves Lane, notable for its steep slope. In 1881 the club moved to Astley Meadow, near the Lamb Inn public house, on a ground that was shorter than the 110 yards minimum to host FA Cup ties and which led to at least one protest. The club was forced to move before the 1883–84 season as its ground was needed for a cemetery, and it found a new ground near a tram stop which it called Astley Meadow. It constructed a grandstand there that could hold 300 people, at a cost of £50. The ground was later used by Astley Bridge Wanderers.
