= Eagley F.C. (1875) =

Defunct association football club in England

- Full name: Eagley Football Club
- Founded: 1875
- Dissolved: 1886
- Ground: Eagley Football Ground
- Capacity: 3,000
- Secretary: John Mangnall
1870s colours	1880s colours

Eagley Football Club was a football club based in the village of Eagley, near Bolton in Greater Manchester.

== History ==
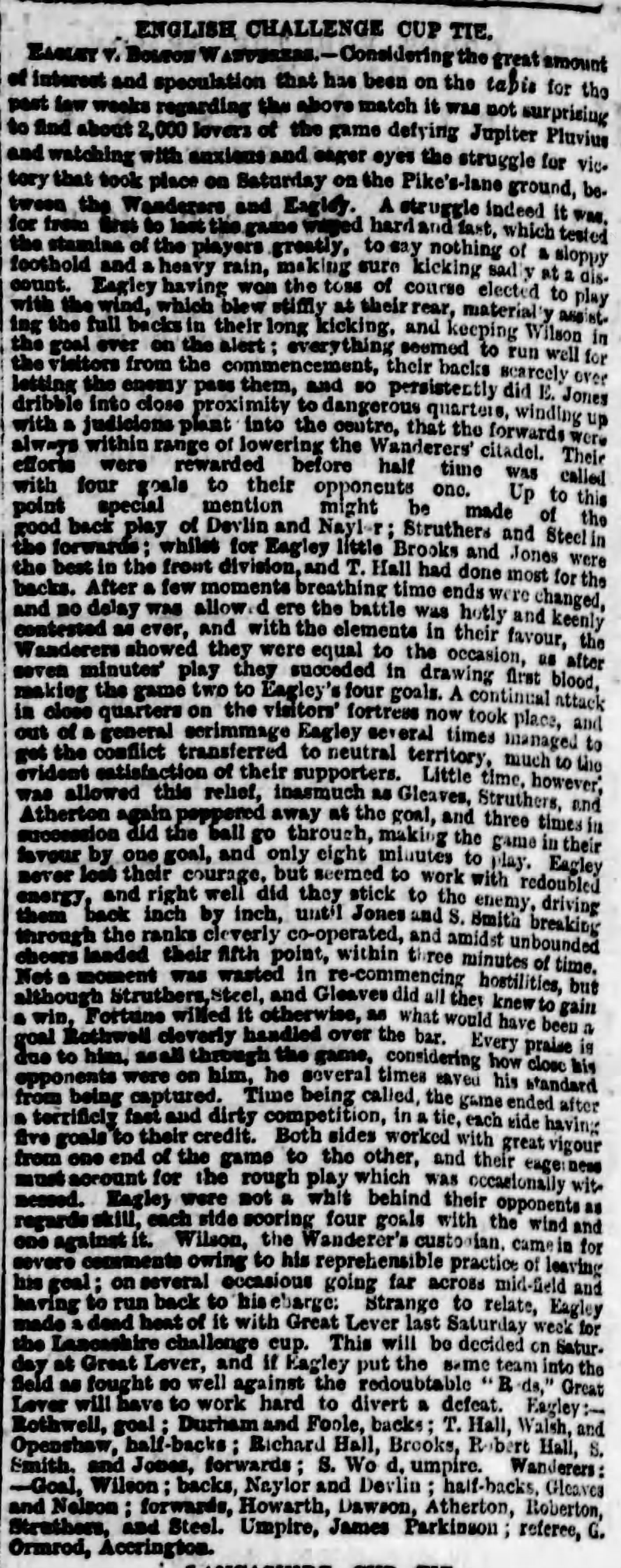
1881–82 FA Cup first round, Bolton Wanderers 5–5 Eagley, Bolton Evening News, 24 October 1881

The club was formed in 1875. It was one of the first clubs in Lancashire playing under association football rules. The club was one of the founder members of the Lancashire County Football Association in 1878, and in 1878–79 it was the first recorded opponents of Preston North End.

The 1878–79 season saw Eagley take part in the first football competition in Lancashire, hosted by Turton; Eagley took home the trophy, beating Turton in the final, despite Turton having "ringers" like Fergie Suter from Darwen playing. The same season, it was also one of the first three Lancashire clubs to enter the FA Cup, along with Darwen and Birch; given the competition was drawn on a regional basis, after Birch's withdrawal, Darwen and Eagley faced each other at the first stage, Darwen winning 4–1 in a replay, in front of a huge crowd of 3,000 at a snow-covered Anchor Ground; George Sharples scored the Eagley goal, when the club was already four behind.

In 1879–80, Eagley was one of the entrants in the first edition of the Lancashire Senior Cup, and its 8–2 defeat by Lower Chapel in the third round was considered a major shock - the rout was so comprehensive that, with Eagley 5–1 down, Eagley's captain and goalkeeper John Mangnall exchanged places with centre-forward Smith. Its best run in the Lancashire Cup came next season, when it reached the quarter-finals, at which stage it lost to Enfield of Accrington.

For the most part, Eagley was seen as a club "added to the fixtures as a make-up", but on 1 October 1881 the club pulled off a major shock result by beating Darwen, away from home, in a friendly, and in 1884 won the Bolton Charity Cup, a 4–2 win over Astley Bridge in the final at Great Lever being greeted with "loud applause". Its first wins, and best run, in the national competition came in 1882–83, reaching the fourth round stage (last 15); at that stage it lost 2–1 at home to Welsh side Druids, after extra-time, before an Eagley record crowd of 3,000.

Nevertheless, the rise of professional football meant that village sides like Eagley were outgunned; in 1882, the club proposed banning players "imported" from Scotland to the Lancashire Football Association, but withdrew the motion when faced with significant opposition. At the end of the 1882–83 season, a merger with Turton was bruited, but did not proceed, and the gap between Eagley and professionals was demonstrated by its last two FA Cup results - a 9–1 defeat at Preston North End in 1883–84 and 6–0 at Bolton Wanderers in the first round in 1885–86; just four years before the latter tie, Eagley had held the Wanderers to a 5–5 draw in the 1881–82 FA Cup, and, in a sign of the times to come, only narrowly lost in a replay after the Wanderers "imported" Steele from Arbroath, who scored the only goal. It lost its best players to other professional clubs (two joining Halliwell in 1884), and notably was not one of the many Lancashire clubs to form the British Football Association, an entity devoted to permitting professionals to play in competitive football. Unable to fight against the tide for long, the club disbanded before the 1886–87 season.

== Colours ==
The club originally wore white jerseys and knickers, with blue hose. By 1883 the club was wearing all black.

== Ground ==
The club's ground was at the Volunteer Inn, a quarter of a mile from Bromley Cross railway station. In 1881 it moved to a new ground, to the west of the village, adjoining the cricket ground, and which featured a brick pavilion and separate dressing rooms; the new accommodation cost the club £600. The club opened the ground on 10 September with a friendly against Blackburn Rovers, which the visitors won 5–2.

== Notable players ==
- George Sharples, right-wing, who played for the club in 1879–80, and became captain of Bolton Wanderers in 1881
- John Mangnall, goalkeeper, who represented Lancashire in an inter-county match against North Wales in February 1879 (alongside George Sharples)
- Tom Hall, who represented Lancashire in an inter-county match against Staffordshire in October 1879, and who played for Eagley from 1876 to 1884
