= Padiham F.C. (1878) =

Former association football club in Lancashire

Padiham
- Full name: Padiham Football Club
- Nicknames: the Caldersiders, the Pads
- Founded: 1878
- Dissolved: 1916
- Ground: Calderside Ground
Original colours	Final colours

Padiham Football Club was an association football club from Padiham, Lancashire, active in the 19th century.

== History ==
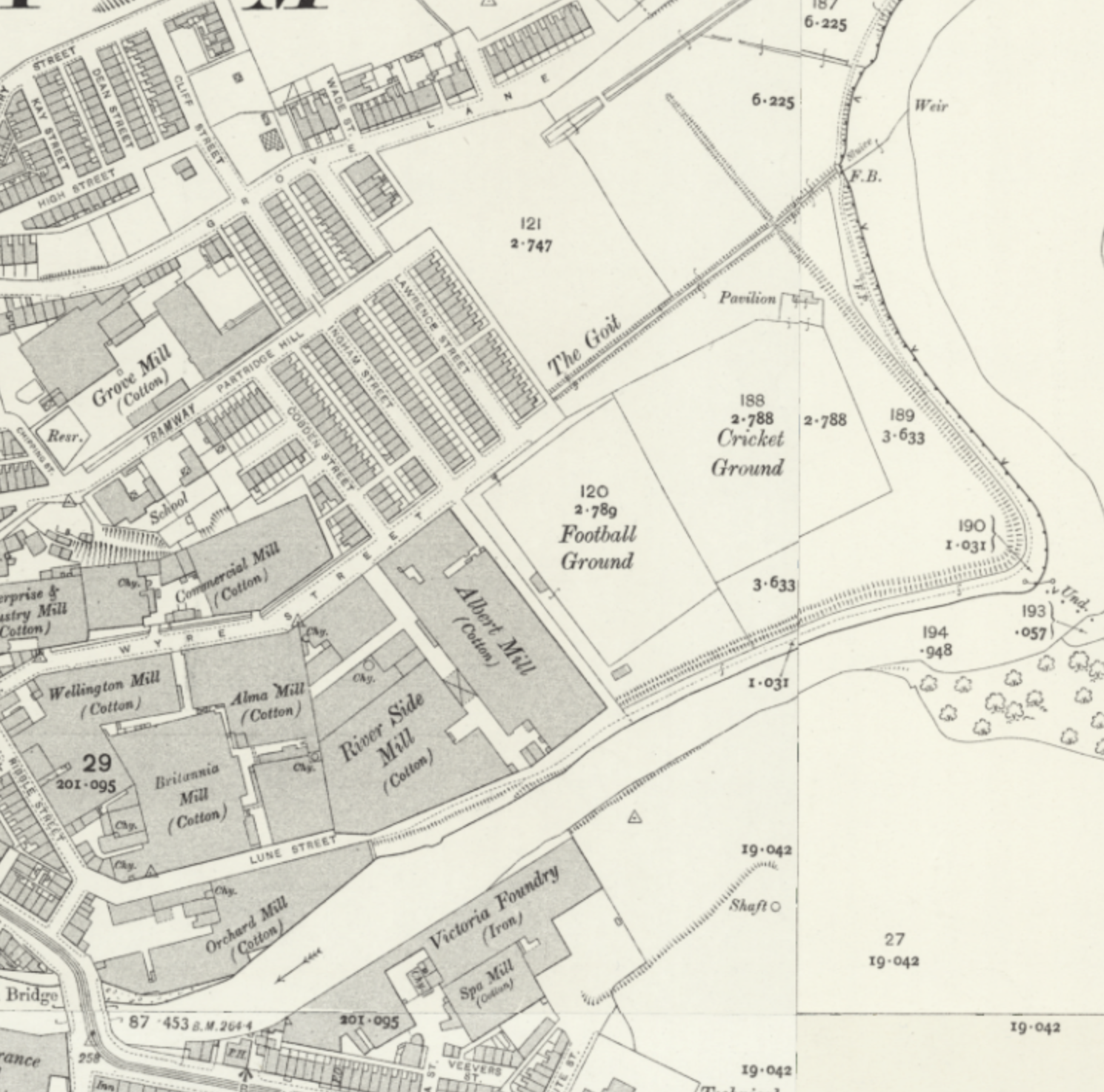
Football and cricket grounds in Padiham, from the Lancashire LXIII 4 Ordnance Survey map, 1912

The club was founded in 1878. It was an entrant in the 1879–80 Lancashire Senior Cup, the first instalment of the county tournament, and indeed hosted the first game of the competition's history; a crowd of around 1,400 saw it lose to Haslingden Association.

As the 1880s progressed, Padiham proved to be an ambitious club. In 1883 it was one of the Lancashire clubs accused of illegally "importing" professional players, and the following year it was one of those which attended the initial meeting of the British Football Association, with a view to legalizing professionalism within competitive football. However, the rise of the league competition made such ambitions untenable, and by the 1890s the club was having to operate on a much smaller scale.

=== Cup competitions ===
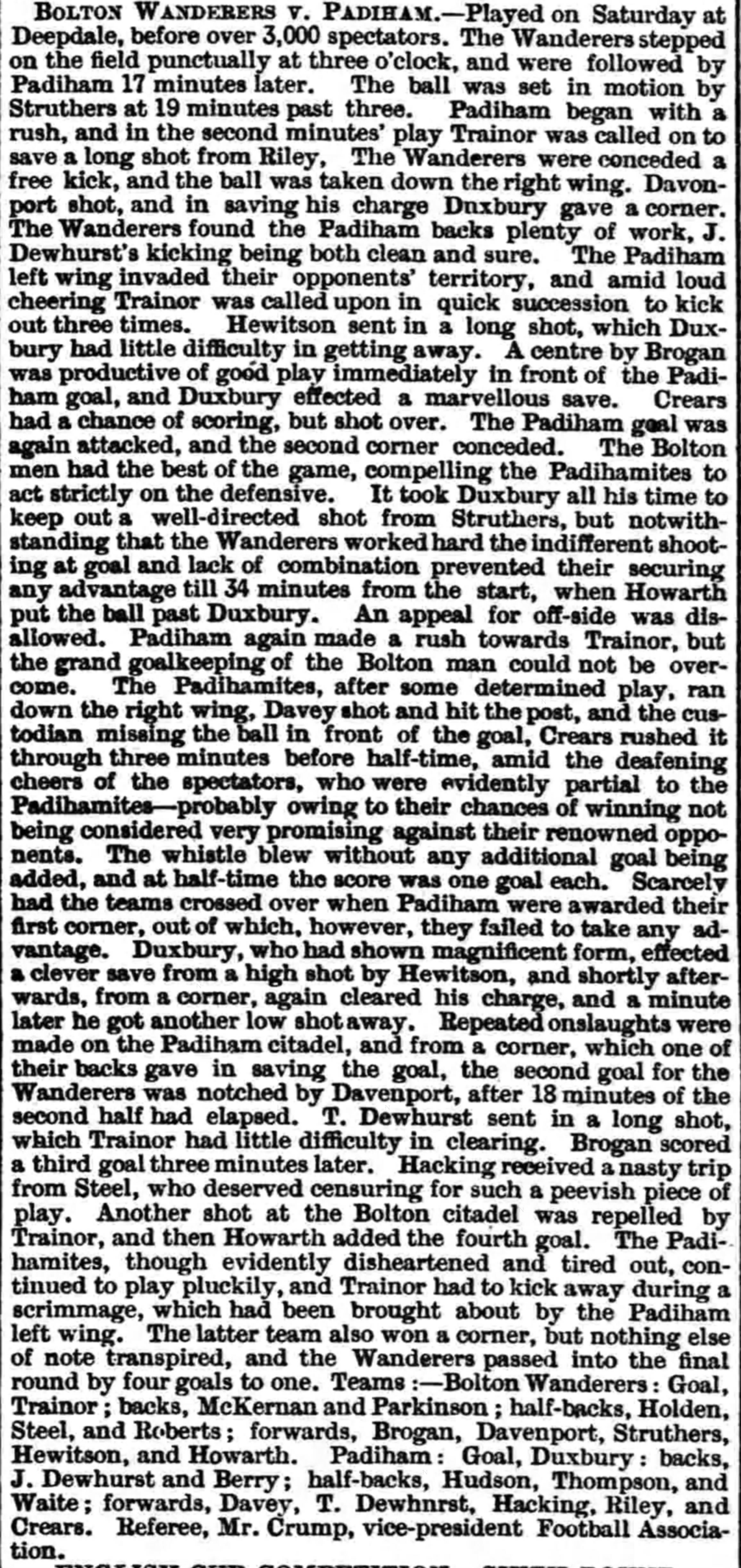
1886–87 Lancashire Senior Cup semi-final, Bolton Wanderers 4–1 Padiham, Blackburn Weekly Standard, 26 February 1887

Padiham's first FA Cup entry came in 1883–84, by which time it had assembled a competitive XI, which had made the final 6 of the 1882–83 Lancashire Senior Cup. It beat Lower Darwen 3–1 at home in the first round, in front of 2,000 fans, and after a bye went down at eventual winners Blackburn Rovers by a not-disgraceful 3–0 scoreline; indeed, with the game scoreless, Padiham hit the bar from a corner, and from another Padiham corner Rovers broke to take a first-half lead. Padiham's ill-luck continued with the second goal being an own goal and the third coming in the last few minutes.

However, it had to withdraw from the 1884–85 FA Cup, as the Football Association had taken a hard line on "imported" professionals, and rather than play a reserve XI, Padiham withdrew. It had one more entry into the main rounds of the competition, in 1885–86, at a time when the club's first XI was strong enough to hold Cup holders Blackburn Rovers to a draw. Padiham's Cup campaign however ended with an ignominious 9–1 defeat in the second round at Rossendale, thanks to its first choice players still not being available under FA regulations. Indeed, the Padiham "main" XI played the same day against Astley Bridge, the game ending 1–1.

The club entered every Lancashire Senior Cup until 1888–89, when it started to enter the Lancashire Junior Cup instead. Its best run in the competition was to the semi-final in 1886–87, going down 4–1 to Bolton Wanderers at Deepdale. It returned to the senior competition in 1903–04 and 1904–05 but lost in the first round both times.

=== League competitions ===
The club was a founder member of the North-east Lancashire League in 1889, but failed to be re-elected for 1890–91. It re-joined the competition for 1891–92, and remained with the competition until its absorption into the Lancashire Combination after the 1894–95, with Padiham one of the clubs accepted for the merged league; even so, its best finish in the North-east Lancashire was a mere 6th out of 10 in the final season.

It was an intermittent member of the Combination until the First World War, missing the 1898–99 and 1899–1900 seasons, and having another gap from 1906 to 1910, when finances compelled the club to run on amateur lines. It was consistently unsuccessful, its highest position being 9th (out of 18 clubs) in 1902–03.

The club played in the wartime North division of the Lancashire Combination in 1915–16, which, because of the paucity of clubs, was split into separate competitions in each year; Padiham finished 7th out of 10 in 1915, and 5th out of 7 in 1916, the club's final recorded fixture being a 2–0 defeat at Blackburn Trinity. The club did not re-appear after that, although there were faint hopes that the club would revive, as in 1922 Burnley offered to keep the ground in good order by using it for its third team, and in 1925 there was a further abortive attempt at a revival. There was however no new club in Padiham until after the Second World War.

== Colours ==
Padiham's original kit was made up of navy blue jerseys with a red sash, white knickers, and navy blue stockings. The club adopted new jerseys of pink and white "quartered" (the contemporary term for counterchanged halves) in September 1882.

In the 20th century the club is known to have worn the following colour jerseys:

- 1901–02: white
- 1902–04: blue and white stripes
- 1905–06: red
- 1912–13: blue.

== Ground ==
The club's ground adjoined Albert Mill, a two-minute walk from Padiham railway station. It was generally referred to as the Calderside Ground, and enjoyed its record attendance of 9,000 against Burnley in 1884.

== Notable players ==
- Former players ( 27 )

One Padiham player went on to play for England; Billy Bradshaw, who started his career with Padiham at the turn of the 20th century while working as a tripe dresser, and who later won the Football League title with Blackburn Rovers.
