= Thurston Rostron =

English footballer

Thurston Rostron (21 April 1863 – 3 July 1891) was an English footballer who played his club football at inside right for Darwen and Blackburn Rovers. He made two appearances for England in 1881, when he was under 18. At the time of his England appearances, he was the second-youngest England player ever. Throughout his career he was known as "Tot" on account of his size, being only 5 ft 6in tall.

== Career ==
Rostron was born in Darwen, Lancashire and after youth football with Helmshore and Old Wanderers he joined Darwen as a teenager. He was the youngest member of their team which reached the FA Cup Semi-final in 1881 played on 26 March 1881, when Darwen FC were beaten 4–1 by the eventual winners, the Old Carthusians.

Earlier he had become the second youngest player to represent England when he was selected to play against Wales on 26 February 1881, when he was 17 years 311 days old. Only James Prinsep was younger on his debut at that time. Subsequently, Wayne Rooney, Theo Walcott and Jude Bellingham have appeared for England at a younger age, and thus Rostron now stands fifth in the list of England's youngest players. For the match against Wales, played at Alexandra Meadows, Blackburn, the English selectors had picked an inexperienced team with seven players making their debuts. Rostron's Darwen teammate, Thomas Marshall played alongside him on the right-wing. England were "a little over-confident against the Welsh, who recorded their first victory on English soil with a 1–0 success".

Despite this defeat, Rostron was selected for the next international, against Scotland played at the Kennington Oval on 12 March 1881. Rostron played at outside right but England went down to a "humiliating" 6–1 defeat.

Rostron left Darwen during the 1883–84 season to play for Great Lever, but returned for the start of the following season. By January 1885, he had joined Blackburn Rovers and appeared in an FA Cup match in January. After this he "drifted out of the game".

Originally a weaver by trade, Rostron became a bowling green keeper, but died on 3 July 1891, aged 28.

His name is displayed in a corridor in Wembley Stadium where the names of the first 1000 people to play for England are displayed.
