= Liverpool Ramblers A.F.C. =

Association football club in England

Liverpool Ramblers
- Full name: Liverpool Ramblers Association Football Club
- Founded: 1882; 144 years ago
- Ground: Moor Lane, Crosby
- Website: liverpoolramblersafc.com
Home colours

Liverpool Ramblers Association Football Club is an English amateur football club based in Crosby, Merseyside. The club is affiliated to the Lancashire County Football Association. The first and second team compete in the Liverpool Football League, whilst the Vets and third team do not compete in any leagues and only play friendly games.

== History ==
The club was formed in 1882, and was the first side from Liverpool to enter the FA Cup. The club was involved in helping John Brodie pioneer the use of goal nets. The club entered the FA cup 3 times between 1882 and 1884 with their best finish seeing them reach the second round of the competition in the 1882-83 competition.

The Ramblers played its first game ever in 1882. Club's secretary Percy Bateson approached a neighbouring soccer club, Bootle Wanderers, who allowed the match to be played on their home ground at nearby Sandfield Place. It was here that the two sides eventually, took to the field. The Ramblers line up was as follows, J Jacob; E M Pilkington, P C Morris; E Heald and G W Turner; H A Cursham, E Baxter, H Baxter, J F Bateson, G Smith, and T Williamson.

After trying to settle down at Liverpool Cricket Club's Aigburth Ground, the Ramblers switched headquarters to the old Crosby Cricket Club and Hightown, establishing then in Crosby's Moor Lane, which their members have all helped to pay for.

== Ground ==
Liverpool Ramblers play their home games at Moor Lane, Crosby. The club moved to this ground in 1937.

== Honours ==
- Liverpool Senior Cup:
  - Runners-up (1): 1882–83

== Records ==
- FA Cup best performance: Second round 1882–83

== Notable players ==
- J. Bruce Ismay, the president of the White Star Line, was a former player with the club and survived the sinking of the RMS Titanic.
- Gerard Dewhurst, the only player from the club to be selected to play for England.
- Dr John Smith, Scottish international who was also a member of the first 'unofficial' British Lions rugby tour to Australia and New Zealand in 1888
- Harry Rose, England reserve who played for Liverpool Ramblers in the 1930s
