= Turton F.C. =

Association football club in England

Coordinates: 53°38′46.71″N 2°23′50.13″W

Turton
- Full name: Turton Football Club
- Nickname: Tigers
- Founded: 1871; 155 years ago
- Ground: Thomason Fold capacity 2500 (20 seated)
- Chairman: Peter Gray
- Manager: Craig Allardyce
- League: West Lancashire League Division One
- 2024–25: West Lancashire League Division One, 12th of 16
Home colours	Away colours

Turton Football Club is a football club based in Edgworth, in the North Turton district of Blackburn with Darwen, Lancashire, England. They are currently members of the West Lancashire League Division One and play at Thomason Fold. The club are affiliated to the Lancashire Football Association.

== History ==
The original Turton FC was formed in 1871, and in the early 1870s they were arguably the leading club in Lancashire. In 1878 they were one of the prime movers in the formation of the Lancashire Football Association, and in 1879–80 they were one of the entrants in the first Lancashire Cup competition, and entered the FA Cup for the first time.

Turton can currently be found in the National Football Museum where they are recognised as significant pioneers of Association Football to the North West, being amongst the founders of the Lancashire FA.

Among the players in the 1870s and 1880s, was John Bentley who later went on to play a significant role in the formation of Bolton Wanderers and it is widely believed that Bolton wear white shirts with blue shorts due to the Turton influence. Bentley later went on to be president of the Football League, vice-chairman of the Football Association and Manchester United secretary. He maintained his close relationship with Turton FC throughout and was president of the club in the early 20th century.

With the rise of professional football in the mid-1880s, Turton were soon no longer a force in the game. However they remained a much respected club, and in 1899–1900, 1901–02, 1902–03, and 1904–05 were winners of the Lancashire Junior Cup, while in 1912–13 they were winners of the Lancashire Amateur Shield. Unfortunately on two separate occasions the club has folded and then been inactive for a lengthy period.

The current home of Turton FC, Thomason Fold, in Edgworth is about a mile away from the original ground, Tower Street, in Chapeltown. This old ground is still in use, with Lancashire Amateur League team Old Boltonians having been the residents for over 50 years. This ground is possibly the oldest remaining football ground in the world.

In 2009, the club nearly folded having been relegated from the West Lancashire Premier Division and losing the majority of its players in the process. Turton were also in terrible financial disarray, owing thousands of pounds and having little income. Long standing club legend Ernie Charnock appointed former player Neil Johnson as manager who was joined by Craig Allardyce, son of the former Bolton Wanderers and Newcastle United manager Sam Allardyce.

Also in 2009, Martin Vizzard was appointed as chairman alongside Dave Yates as his vice; joined later by Peter Gray, a local entrepreneur and business man on the committee. Vizzard stepped down from the position in 2013 following a brain tumour, his work as chairman was instrumental in changing the fortunes of the club. Vizzard died in 2014. Peter Gray took the reins as chairman of the club and the good work both on and off the pitch has continued.

Turton achieved promotion as runners up to the West Lancashire Premier Division in 2015. The promotion however was denied by the league due to inadequate facilities; despite over £50,000 being spent on ground improvements in the close season. The case went to appeal but the Lancashire FA withheld the league's decision to controversially block promotion. This was a massive blow for the club and caused public outcry within Bolton, with the club gaining support from several former professionals including Sam Allardyce, Dave Flitcroft and Mike Pollitt.

Following the disappointment of that season the team regained promotion as champions of the league in the 2015–16 season as champions, with the league confirming the works carried out by now, were good enough to allow promotion. In season 2018-19 the club under new manager Craig Jones, won an unprecedented cup double winning the league Richardson Cup, for the first time in 30 years. This was followed by success in winning the Lancashire Amateur Shield which the club had not won for 106 years prior.

The club is currently managed once again by Craig Allardyce after Craig Jones left post Covid, and a short unsuccessful spell from Paul Marriot. Allardyce came in to steer the club clear of relegation

The club also has a reserve team in West Lancashire league Reserve Div1 managed by Andy Mason.

The club had no junior teams left in 2011, but it has grown this part of the club again and going into the 2023–24 season had 19 teams playing in the Bolton & Bury Junior League, being one of the largest junior clubs in Bolton

In July 2018 Club stalwart Ernie Charnock died aged 73 after serving 52 years as a volunteer for the club.

== Colours ==
The earliest recorded colours for the club are blue and black jerseys, blue knickers, and blue hose. In 1897 the club adopted red and white stripes, described in 1901 as maroon and white stripes, and in 1903 it changed to plain maroon. The white shirts had been adopted by 1907 at the latest.

== Ground ==
Turton FC play their home games at the Thomason Fold Ground in the village of Edgworth. In 2015, the ground underwent major improvements thanks to grants from the FA and other sources. Improvements included a new changing facility to accommodate FA regulations for level 7 football. The club's colours are white and navy blue shirts and navy blue shorts.

== Honours ==
- West Lancashire League Premier Division
  - Runners-up 1993–94
- West Lancashire League Division One
  - Winners 2015-16 Runners-up 2001–02, 2014–2015
- West Lancashire League Division Two
  - Winners 1987–88
  - Runners-up 1999–2000
- Lancashire Junior Cup
  - Winners 1899–1900, 1901–02, 1902–03, 1904–05
- West Lancashire League Richardson Cup
  - Winners 2018–2019
- Lancashire Amateur Shield
  - Winners 1912–1913
  - Winners 2018–2019
- West Lancs League Wilf Carr Memorial Trophy

Winners 2019–20

== Records ==
- FA Cup
  - Third Round 1880–81, 1881–82
