= Lancashire Senior Cup =

- Founded: 1879
- Region: Lancashire
- Teams: 16
- Current champions: Burnley (2026)
- Most championships: Blackburn Rovers (20 times)
- Website: Lancashire FA

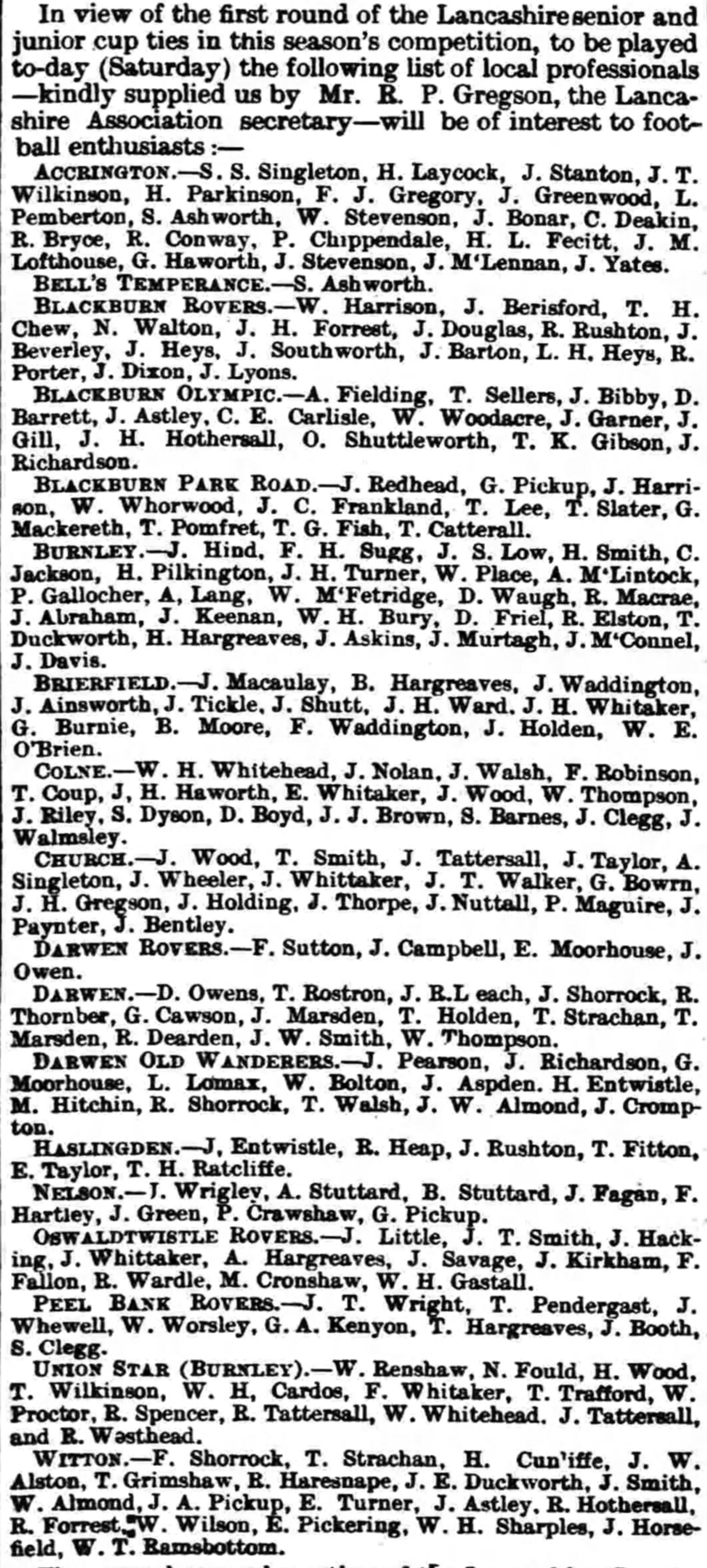
List of professional footballers in Lancashire in the 1887–88 season, Blackburn Weekly Standard, 1 October 1887

The Lancashire County Football Association Cup (commonly known as the Lancashire Senior Cup) is an association football knockout tournament involving teams from Lancashire, England. It is a County Cup competition of the Lancashire County Football Association and involves Premier League clubs and Football League clubs. However, these days clubs generally field their reserve teams.

Historic Lancashire currently has 5 Premier League teams, 12 Football League sides and 4 National League teams; not every club enters in concurrent years. The tournament starts at the round of 16, with higher division clubs often have to miss rounds to allow lower division clubs to have a chance to play in the competition.

== History ==
The competition was stopped in 1974 due to concerns over the format and lack of interest in adding to fixture lists. It was then revived and revamped as a pre-season tournament in 1982, becoming known as the 'Lancashire Manx Cup' due to its sponsorship by the Isle of Man Tourist Board. In 1992, a new sponsorship was agreed with Marsden Building Society, and the competition became known as the 'Marsden Lancashire Cup'.

== List of finals ==
Lancashire Senior Cup finals
Season	Winners	Score	Runners–up	Venue	Attendance
1879–80	Darwen	3–0	Blackburn Rovers	Barley Bank, Darwen	9,000
1880–81	Accrington	6–4	Blackburn Park Road	Barley Bank, Darwen	4,000
1881–82	Blackburn Rovers	3–1	Accrington	Burnley Cricket Club, Burnley	5,000
1882–83	Blackburn Rovers	3–2	Darwen	Barley Bank, Darwen	12,000
1883–84	Blackburn Rovers	1–1; 2–1 (replay)	Blackburn Olympic	Deepdale, Preston; Barley Bank, Darwen	10,000; 6,000
1884–85	Blackburn Rovers	2–1	Blackburn Olympic	Deepdale, Preston	6,000
1885–86	Bolton Wanderers	1–0	Blackburn Rovers	Deepdale, Preston	7,000
1886–87	Preston North End	3–0	Bolton Wanderers	Pike's Lane, Bolton	14,500
1887–88	Accrington	n/a (Note: Accrington awarded the victory as fellow finalist Preston North End refused to play the final in Blackburn, and a play-off was held between the losing semi-finalists to determine the runner-up, which saw Witton beat Darwen Old Wanderers)	Witton	Leamington Road, Blackburn	(n/a)
1888–89	Accrington	1–1; 1–0 (replay)	Higher Walton	Leamington Road, Blackburn; Deepdale, Preston	3,000; 6,000
1889–90	Burnley	2–0	Blackburn Rovers	Thorneyholme Road, Accrington	15,000
1890–91	Bolton Wanderers	3–1	Darwen	Anfield, Liverpool	7,000
1891–92	Bury	2–0	Blackburn Rovers	Deepdale, Preston	12,000
1892–93	Preston North End	2–0	Bolton Wanderers	Ewood Park, Blackburn	4,000
1893–94	Everton	2–1	Bolton Wanderers	Hyde Road, Manchester	7,000
1894–95	Preston North End	2–0	Everton	Ewood Park, Blackburn	8,000
1895–96	Blackburn Rovers	1–1; 2–0 (replay)	Bury	Burnden Park, Bolton	13,000; 17,529
1896–97	Everton	2–0	Manchester City	Ewood Park, Blackburn	8,000
1897–98	Newton Heath	2–1	Blackburn Rovers	Goodison Park, Liverpool	5,000
1898–99	Bury	3–1	Bolton Wanderers	Burnden Park, Bolton	3,946
1899–1900	Preston North End	1–0	Burnley	Deepdale, Preston	5,000
1900–01	Blackburn Rovers	4–0	Burnley	Hyde Road, Manchester	8,000
1901–02	Blackburn Rovers	1–0	Burnley	Hyde Road, Manchester	4,000
1902–03	Bury	1–0	Everton	Gigg Lane, Bury	7,032
1903–04	Blackburn Rovers	2–1	Southport Central	Deepdale, Preston	1,500
1904–05	Southport Central	2–1	Everton	Haig Avenue, Southport	5,000
1905–06	Bury	4–0	Accrington Stanley	Ewood Park, Blackburn	7,000
1906–07	Blackburn Rovers	3–0	Liverpool	Ewood Park, Blackburn	10,000
1907–08	Oldham Athletic	2–0	Preston North End	Hyde Road, Manchester	8,000
1908–09	Blackburn Rovers	5–3	Liverpool	Ewood Park, Blackburn	14,000
1909–10	Everton	4–0	Blackburn Rovers	Goodison Park, Liverpool	10,000
1910–11	Blackburn Rovers	1–1; 2–2 aet (replay); 0–0 (replay); 2–1 (replay)	Burnley	Ewood Park, Blackburn; Turf Moor, Burnley; Burnden Park, Bolton; Ewood Park, Blackburn	5,000; 8,500; 10,000; 10,000
1911–12	Bolton Wanderers	4–1	Burnley	Burnden Park, Bolton	11,000
1912–13	Manchester United	3–2	Blackburn Rovers	Bloomfield Road, Blackpool	8,000
1913–14	Manchester United	1–0	Blackpool	Burnden Park, Bolton	2,457
1914–15	Burnley	4–1	Rochdale	Hyde Road, Manchester	2,000
1915–18	(no competition)				
1918–19	Liverpool	3–0	Oldham Athletic	Old Trafford, Manchester	21,605
1919–20	Liverpool; Manchester United	1–1 (Note: Joint winners. AET 30 minutes plus 20 minutes. No replay was played)	(n/a)	Anfield, Liverpool	15,000
1920–21	Manchester City	2–1	Bolton Wanderers	Old Trafford, Manchester	25,000
1921–22	Bolton Wanderers	3–1	Bury	Gigg Lane, Bury	15,912
1922–23	Manchester City	1–0	Liverpool	Burnden Park, Bolton	9,115
1923–24	Liverpool	1–1; 2–0	Manchester City	Maine Road, Manchester; Anfield, Liverpool	10,000; 14,227
1924–25	Bolton Wanderers	2–1	Blackpool	Burnden Park, Bolton	11,292
1925–26	Bury	5–2	Accrington Stanley	Burnden Park, Bolton	7,305
1926–27	Bolton Wanderers	1–0	Bury	Burnden Park, Bolton	13,229
1927–28	Manchester City	3–1	Bury	Old Trafford, Manchester	25,000
1928–29	Manchester United	2–1	Blackburn Rovers	Old Trafford, Manchester	11,632
1929–30	Manchester City	3–0	Burnley	Maine Road, Manchester	10,768
1930–31	Liverpool	4–0	Manchester United	Anfield, Liverpool	9,555
1931–32	Bolton Wanderers	3–2	Manchester City	Maine Road, Manchester	15,386
1932–33	Liverpool	2–1	Bolton Wanderers	Anfield, Liverpool	10,363
1933–34	Bolton Wanderers	4–2	Oldham Athletic	Maine Road, Manchester	6,173
1934–35	Everton	3–1	Bury	Goodison Park, Liverpool	2,000
1935–36	Blackpool	6–2	Wigan Athletic	Bloomfield Road, Blackpool	8,889
1936–37	Blackpool	2–1	Blackburn Rovers	Bloomfield Road, Blackpool	5,400
1937–38	Manchester United	1–0	Southport	Haig Avenue, Southport	7,931
1938–39	Bolton Wanderers; Preston North End	1–1 (Note: Joint winners. A replay was scheduled for early in the 1939-40 season, but never got played)	(n/a)	Deepdale, Preston	5,850
1939–40	Everton	4–2	Bury	Gigg Lane, Bury	3,522
1940–41	Manchester United	1–0	Burnley	Turf Moor, Burnley	9,790
1941–42	Blackpool	7–1	Blackburn Rovers	Bloomfield Road, Blackpool	10,000
1942–43	Manchester United	3–1 (1st leg); 3–3 (2nd leg)	Liverpool	Anfield, Liverpool; Maine Road, Manchester	12,117; 9,196
1943–44	Liverpool	3–1 (1st leg); 3–2 (2nd leg)	Bolton Wanderers	Anfield, Liverpool; Burnden Park, Bolton	16,591; 10,254
1944–45	Blackburn Rovers	2–0 (1st leg); 4–3 (2nd leg)	Accrington Stanley	Ewood Park, Blackburn; Peel Park, Accrington	6,726; 5,334
1945–46	Manchester United	1–0	Burnley	Maine Road, Manchester	36,500
1946–47	Liverpool	2–1	Bury	Anfield, Liverpool	23,018
1947–48	Bolton Wanderers	5–1	Southport	Haig Avenue, Southport	10,734
1948–49	Rochdale	1–0	Blackpool	Boundary Park, Oldham	13,174
1949–50	Burnley	3–0	Liverpool	Turf Moor, Burnley	16,898
1950–51	Manchester United	2–1	Bury	Old Trafford, Manchester	5,656
1951–52	Burnley	1–0	Barrow	Holker Street, Barrow-in-Furness	10,516
1952–53	Manchester City	5–1	Chester	Sealand Road, Chester	4,407
1953–54	Blackpool	3–0	Liverpool	Bloomfield Road, Blackpool	5,904
1954–55	Barrow	2–0	Oldham Athletic	Holker Street, Barrow-in-Furness	6,110
1955–56	Liverpool	4–4; 2–0 (replay)	Blackburn Rovers	Anfield, Liverpool	6,048; 6,581
1956–57	Chester	1–0	Burnley	Sealand Road, Chester	2,661
1957–58	Bury	2–1	Preston North End	Gigg Lane, Bury	2,376
1958–59	Liverpool	1–0	Everton	Anfield, Liverpool	22,193
1959–60	Burnley	4–2	Manchester United	Turf Moor, Burnley	3,831
1960–61	Burnley	1–0	Blackburn Rovers	Turf Moor, Burnley	5,225
1961–62	Burnley	2–1	Liverpool	Turf Moor, Burnley	9,217
1962–63	(competition not completed)				
1963–64	Everton	7–1	Blackburn Rovers	Goodison Park, Liverpool	5,440
1964–65	Burnley	2–0	Southport	Turf Moor, Burnley	4,565
1965–66	Burnley	4–0	Barrow	Holker Street, Barrow-in-Furness	7,158
1966–67	Oldham Athletic	2–0	Barrow	Boundary Park, Oldham	3,512
1967–68	Morecambe	2–1	Burnley	Christie Park, Morecambe	4,230
1968–69	Manchester United	1–0	Liverpool	Old Trafford, Manchester	4,299
1969–70	Burnley	3–2	Barrow	Turf Moor, Burnley	3,251
1970–71	Rochdale	3–2	Oldham Athletic	Spotland, Rochdale	7,003
1971–72	Burnley	2–2; 3–0 (replay)	Manchester United	Old Trafford, Manchester; Turf Moor, Burnley	unknown 4,500
1972–73	Liverpool	2–1	Bury	Gigg Lane, Bury	1,975
1973–74	Manchester City	3–0	Morecambe	Christie Park, Morecambe	3,221
1974–82	(no competition)				
1982–83	Bury	2–1	Blackburn Rovers	Gigg Lane, Bury	2,873
1983–84	Blackburn Rovers	0–0 (3–1 pen.)	Bury	Ewood Park, Blackburn	3,615
1984–85	Wigan Athletic	2–1	Blackburn Rovers	Springfield Park, Wigan	4,002
1985–86	Blackburn Rovers	1–0	Burnley	Ewood Park, Blackburn	6,017
1986–87	Bury	1–0	Wigan Athletic	Gigg Lane, Bury	2,682
1987–88	Blackburn Rovers	2–2 (4–3 pen.)	Wigan Athletic	Ewood Park, Blackburn	4,414
1988–89	Bolton Wanderers	1–0	Preston North End	Burnden Park, Bolton	5,757
1989–90	Blackburn Rovers	1–0	Blackpool	Bloomfield Road, Blackpool	4,685
1990–91	Bolton Wanderers	2–1	Preston North End	Burnden Park, Bolton	4,585
1991–92	Wigan Athletic	4–1	Preston North End	Springfield Park, Wigan	3,315
1992–93	Burnley	2–2 (4–3 pen.)	Bury	Turf Moor, Burnley	5,198
1993–94	Blackpool	1–0	Manchester United	Bloomfield Road, Blackpool	6,612
1994–95	Blackpool	1–0	Bury	Bloomfield Road, Blackpool	3,150
1995–96	Blackpool	2–2 (4–2 pen.)	Wigan Athletic	Bloomfield Road, Blackpool	3,139
1996–97	Preston North End	2–1	Blackpool	Deepdale, Preston	3,913
1997–98	(no competition)				
1998–99	Wigan Athletic	3–1	Rochdale	Springfield Park, Wigan	2,191
1999–2004	(no competition)				
2004–05	Rochdale	1–0	Bury	Spotland, Rochdale	503
2005–06	Oldham Athletic	0–0 (7–6 pen.)	Preston North End	County Ground, Leyland	400
2006–07	Blackburn Rovers	6–2	Bolton Wanderers	County Ground, Leyland	189
2007–08	Manchester United	3–2	Liverpool		
2008–09	Manchester United	1–0	Bolton Wanderers		
2009–10	Liverpool	3–0	Oldham Athletic		
2010–11	Blackburn Rovers	1–1 (3–2 pen.)	Preston North End		
2011–12	Manchester United	4–0	Accrington Stanley		
2012–13	Manchester United	2–1	Manchester City		
2013–14	Bury	1–1 (4–2 pen.)	Wigan Athletic		
2014–15	Bury	2–1	Rochdale		
2015–16	Everton	2–2 (5–3 pen.)	Oldham Athletic		
2016–17	Liverpool	1–1 (5–4 pen.)	Fleetwood Town		
2017–18	Bury	4–2	Fleetwood Town		
2018–19	Blackburn Rovers	2–0	Burnley	County Ground, Leyland	491
2019–20	(no competition)				
2020–21	Blackburn Rovers	3–1	Wigan Athletic		
2021–22	Liverpool	1–0	Burnley	County Ground, Leyland	
2022–23	Burnley	1–1 (4–1 pen.)	Barrow	County Ground, Leyland	
2023–24	Barrow	1–1 (4–3 pen.)	Burnley	Holker Street, Barrow-in-Furness	
2024–25	Bolton Wanderers	1–0	Burnley	County Ground, Leyland	
2025–26	Burnley	2–1	Blackburn Rovers	County Ground, Leyland	

== Table of winners ==
	Club	Number of wins	Most recent win
1	Blackburn Rovers	20	2020–21
2	Manchester United	15	2012–13
3	Burnley	14	2025–26
4	Liverpool	13	2021–22
4	Bolton Wanderers	13	2024–25
6	Bury	11	2017–18
7	Blackpool	7	1995–96
7	Everton	7	2015–16
9	Manchester City	6	1973–74
9	Preston North End	6	1996–97
11	Accrington	3	1888–89
11	Oldham Athletic	3	2005–06
11	Rochdale	3	2004–05
11	Wigan Athletic	3	1998–99
15	Barrow	2	2023-24
16	Chester City (as Chester)	1	1956–57
16	Darwen	1	1879–80
16	Morecambe	1	1967–68
16	Southport	1	1904–05

== See also ==
- Lancashire Challenge Trophy
- Liverpool Senior Cup
- Manchester Senior Cup
