= 1900–01 West Ham United F.C. season =

English football team season

West Ham United
1900–01 season
- Chairman: Cornelius Osborn; Lazzeluer Johnson
- Club secretary: Lew Bowen
- Stadium: Memorial Grounds
- Southern League First Division: 6th
- FA Cup: Intermediate round (eliminated by Liverpool)
- Top goalscorer: League: Billy Grassam (12 goals); All: Billy Grassam (15 goals)
- Highest home attendance: 10,000 (vs. Clapton, 8 December 1900
- Lowest home attendance: 1,000 (vs. Luton Town, 9 February 1901, and Kettering Town, 5 April 1901)
- Average home league attendance: 3,800
Home colours

The 1900–01 season was English football club West Ham United’s inaugural season. The club had been founded in 1895 under the name of Thames Ironworks, before being wound up in June 1900 and resigning from the Southern League. On 5 July, West Ham United Football Club Company Limited was registered and the club took the Southern League place vacated by Thames Ironworks. They finished the season sixth in the Southern League Division One. The club also entered the FA Cup, reaching the intermediate round.

== Overview ==
The prospectus of the new limited liability company, to be known under the title of The West Ham United Football Club Company Limited is at hand. The primary object will be to encourage and promote the game of football in West Ham and district, and powers have also been taken by the company authorising them at any time to acquire land and other property. The company has been constituted on the ordinary lines, except that by the rules of the English Football Association no dividend beyond 5 per cent per annum can be paid. The affairs will be managed by a board of directors.

— Morning Leader. 28 April 1900.

Shares in the club were sold to the public at 10 shillings each, with Arnold Hills promising to purchase one share for each one sold to the public. These could be purchased in four instalments of 2/6 d. Of the 4,000 shares available, 260 remained unsold in March 1901. At the first meeting of directors on 10 July 1900, Cornelius Osborn was appointed as chairman, with Lew Bowen as club secretary. Bowen was a clerk at the Thames Ironworks and Shipbuilding Company and had reported on the previous club for the Thames Ironworks Gazette. Of the ten directors, half were appointed by Hills and half by the shareholders, including Aitken Brown, a local councillor. Also amongst the directors was former Old St Luke's player and local businessman George Fundell. All of the directors lived in Essex, most in the Canning Town and West Ham areas, and several had connections to the Ironworks or had business relationships with Hills. In spite of Hills' assistance the club struggled financially and were forced to secure a loan of £400 later in the season.

Today the West Ham United F.C. is in the hands of you locals. It is your club, and you, who are shareholders, have a voice in its management. Those who are not, I make a strenuous appeal for your support. It would be a standing disgrace to a district like West Ham, which is considered a hot-bed of football, if the club were allowed to go unsupported. I have the names of the players before me, and I see no reason why we should not figure highly up in the Southern League table. In closing, I would say, let there be unity of action. Let each supporter strive for the good of his club both on and off the field. Let each work for one end – that of making the club the best in England. Much depends on a good rousing cheer when things are going against your side. Be liberal with your praise and sparing with your criticism. Above all, be sportsmen and gentlemen. Success and failure hang in the balance. Everything depends upon you. Will you make the club a success? And as a sportsman I think – dropping the third person for a moment – the answer is 'We will'.

— West Ham Guardian. Prior to the start of the 1900–01 season.

The club continued to play at the Memorial Grounds, with hopes that the new train station at West Ham would enable greater access to the stadium. Ultimately, the station would not be opened until February 1901. Hills’ promise to match the public shareholding, and his offer of free use of the Memorial Grounds, came with the proviso that the players would refrain from drinking alcohol. As such, the club continued to be known as the Teetotallers, in addition to the Irons and the Hammers, references to the club's shipbuilding heritage. Fines were imposed on players that did not adhere to the principle of abstinence. They would play in the Southern League First Division for the second season, after being promoted as Thames Ironworks prior to 1899–1900. A preview of the season in the Daily News described the league as "now, without a doubt, second only in importance and the strength of its clubs to the Football League itself. With the exception of Woolwich Arsenal, who prefer to remain members of the Second Division of the Football League, all the best professional teams in the South are now enrolled in the ranks of the Southern League".

Many of the playing staff continued with the new club. The likes of Bill Joyce, Kenny McKay and Albert Carnelly had departed, but Tommy Moore, Syd King, Charlie Craig, Charlie Dove, George Neil, Bob Allan, Roddy McEachrane, Fred Corbett, Frankie Taylor and Len Walker all played a part in the season. Players signed from other clubs before the start of the season included Hugh Monteith from Bristol City, Billy Grassam and Jimmy Reid from Burslem Port Vale, Luke Raisbeck from Middlesbrough, Fergus Hunt from Woolwich Arsenal, Fred Fenton from Gainsborough Trinity, and Albert Kaye from Chatham. Walter Tranter, who had played for the Ironworks before spending the previous season at Chatham, was also signed. Tom Robinson, the previous trainer, also remained, and Abe Norris was appointed. Of the former Ironworks players, only Tranter, Craig, Dove, and captain McEachrane, featured in the opening fixture against Gravesend United.

West Ham's first match, on 1 September 1900, saw the club run out 7–0 winners against the Kent club, although the attendance was unexpectedly low at 2,000. Billy Grassam scored four of the goals, the first within five minutes, with Reid scoring a brace and Hunt the other. The match saw the introduction of new team colours, with a claret stripe running down the white shorts and black socks replacing the previous claret ones, although light blue shirts were still worn. The kit would be commemorated 117 years later as the basis for the club's third kit for the 2017–18 season.

After a 3–1 away defeat to rival club Millwall Athletic, the club hosted Southampton, who had won the Southern League title in three of the previous four seasons and had reached the FA Cup Final in 1899–1900. 7,500 attended the match and witnessed the Irons win 2–0. There was some controversy, however, as the match had to be stopped for around 20 minutes after a pitch invasion and the club directorate came in for criticism due to the presence of only two police constables.

Former Thames Ironworks club secretary George Neil would play his only game for the new club on 13 October, replacing the injured Bob Allan against Watford. West Ham won 2–0, with goals from Corbett and Fenton, which saw the club placed third in the table after six games. On 3 November, West Ham played their first FA Cup game, a third qualifying round fixture against local amateur club Olympic at the Memorial Grounds. The match was a one-sided affair, with the away team goalkeeper Meates performing well to keep the scoreline at 1–0, after Fenton had scored 10 minutes in with a ball that had appeared to be meant as a cross. After an injury to Charlie Dove, the club signed Willie Kelly from Hamilton Academical. His debut came against Bristol Rovers on 24 November. The Hammers also signed George Ratcliffe from Grimsby Town, then of the Football League Second Division. He scored on his debut against Reading on 1 December.

The largest home attendance came in an FA Cup fifth qualifying round fixture against local side Clapton on 8 December. A crowd of 10,000 attended the match, which ended 1–1. The Hammers went on to win the replay at the Old Spotted Dog Ground 3–2 after Billy Grassam scored a hat-trick. The Clapton ‘keeper Harry Earle (whose son later played for West Ham) had been at fault for the second after running out and leaving his goal unguarded. West Ham progressed to the intermediate round of the competition, featuring teams that had overcome the qualifying rounds and those that had been given byes. On 5 January 1901, 6,000 attended the match at home to Liverpool – the first League opposition to play at the Memorial Grounds – which saw Sam Raybould’s goal, contested as offside by the home team, give the visitors a 1–0 victory and progression in the competition. Then followed a loss to Bristol City and three victories, over Swindon Town, Watford and Luton Town, before the club’s worst defeat of the season on 16 February. This came at the hands of Tottenham Hotspur, a 4–1 loss in which Tommy Moore, deputising in goal for Hugh Monteith who had lumbago, was at fault for three of the goals. This would prove to be his final appearance for the club and he left at the end of the season after three years of service.

The club then embarked on an eight-match unbeaten run, which included victory over Millwall, and would take them through to the season’s penultimate fixture, away to Reading. Grassam scored the last of his 12 league goals in the match, but three goals from the Royals in the second half ended the run. On 28 April, West Ham finished their first season with a 2–0 win over New Brompton. The match marked the final appearance of Charlie Dove – the only player to have remained at the club since its inception as Thames Ironworks six years previously – who left for Millwall. With that win, the Hammers ensured a sixth-place finish.

== Personnel ==
=== Directors ===
- A.F. Hills (president)
- L. Johnson (chairman)
- A.C. Davis
- G.C. Fundell
- G.C. Handley
- C.E. Osborn

- G.J. Hone
- J. Grisdale
- E. Smith
- J.W.Y. Cearns
- A. Brown

=== Squad ===
Position^{[a]}	Player	SL apps	SL goals	Cup apps	Cup goals	Total apps	Total goals
RH	Bob Allan	24	0	3	0	27	0
CF	Fred Corbett	21	7	2	2	23	9
LB	Charlie Craig	25	0	6	0	31	0
CH	Charlie Dove	13	0	3	0	16	0
OL	Fred Fenton	14	2	5	1	19	3
IR	Billy Grassam	20	12	3	3	23	15
OR	Fergus Hunt	27	3	6	1	33	4
IL	Albert Kaye	14	2	6	3	20	5
CH	Willie Kelly	19	0	3	0	22	0
RB	Syd King	22	0	6	0	28	0
LH	Roddy McEachrane	28	1	6	0	34	1
GK	Hugh Monteith	24	0	6	0	30	0
GK	Tommy Moore	4	0	0	0	4	0
RH	George Neil	1	0	0	0	1	0
LB	A. Pinder	1	0	0	0	1	0
LB	Dick Pudan	2	0	0	0	2	0
CH	Luke Raisbeck	2	0	2	0	4	0
IL	George Ratcliffe	17	4	1	0	18	4
CF	Jimmy Reid	13	5	6	0	19	5
OL	Frankie Taylor	12	4	0	0	12	4
RB	Walter Tranter	4	0	2	0	6	0
IL	Len Walker	1	0	0	0	1	0

a. Indicates the most common position played during this season

== Friendlies ==
West Ham played a number of friendlies over the course of the season, including a Christmas Day fixture against Woolwich Arsenal, local derbies against Millwall Athletic and Leytonstone, and a benefit match for Portsmouth goalkeeper Matt Reilly.

30 August 1900 Friendly	West Ham United	3–0	West Norwood	Canning Town, London
				Stadium: Memorial Grounds

10 November 1900 Friendly	Millwall Athletic	0–0	West Ham United	Isle of Dogs, London
				Stadium: The Athletic Grounds

25 December 1900 Friendly	Woolwich Arsenal	1–0	West Ham United	Plumstead, London
				Stadium: Manor Ground

26 December 1900 Friendly	Millwall Athletic	1–0	West Ham United	Isle of Dogs, London
				Stadium: The Athletic Grounds

3 April 1901 Friendly	West Norwood	0–3	West Ham United	West Norwood, London
			Ratcliffe (2); Corbett

8 April 1901 Friendly	West Ham United	3–0	Burslem Port Vale	Canning Town, London
	Ratcliffe; Unknown			Stadium: Memorial Grounds

9 April 1901 Friendly	Leytonstone	1–6	West Ham United	Leytonstone, London
			Reid (3), Grassam (2, both pens); Ratcliffe

17 April 1901 Friendly	Millwall Athletic	0–0	West Ham United	Isle of Dogs, London
				Stadium: The Athletic Grounds

24 April 1901 Friendly	Watford	0–1	West Ham United	Watford
			Hunt	Stadium: Cassio Road

25 April 1901 Friendly	West Ham United	0–0	Woolwich Arsenal	Canning Town, London
				Stadium: Memorial Grounds

24 April 1901 Friendly	Brighton & Hove Rangers	1–1	West Ham United	Brighton and Hove
			Corbett

29 April 1901 Friendly	Portsmouth	2–1	West Ham United	Portsmouth
	Joyce; Lewis	Report	Reid	Stadium: Fratton Park; Attendance: 2,000; Referee: Bob Blyth

== Competitions ==
=== Overview ===
Competition	Pld	W	D	L	GF	GA	GAv	WPCT
Southern League First Division	28	14	5	9	40	28	1.429	50.00
FA Cup	6	3	2	1	10	6	1.667	50.00
Total	34	17	7	10	50	34	1.471	50.00

=== Southern League ===
==== League table ====
Pos	Team	Pld	W	D	L	GF	GA	GR	Pts
4	Millwall Athletic	28	17	2	9	55	32	1.719	36
5	Tottenham Hotspur	28	16	4	8	55	33	1.667	36
6	West Ham United	28	14	5	9	40	28	1.429	33
7	Bristol Rovers	28	14	4	10	46	35	1.314	32
8	Queens Park Rangers	28	11	4	13	43	48	0.896	26

Rules for classification: The system of using goal average to separate two teams tied on points was used up until the 1976-77 season. The points system: 2 points for a win, 1 point for a draw and 0 points for losing.

==== Matches ====
1 September 1900 1	West Ham United	7–0	Gravesend United	Canning Town, London
	Grassam (4); Reid (2); Hunt	Report		Stadium: Memorial Grounds; Attendance: 2,000

8 September 1900 2	Millwall Athletic	3–1	West Ham United	Isle of Dogs, London
		Report	Reid	Stadium: The Athletic Grounds; Attendance: 10,000

15 September 1900 3	West Ham United	2–0	Southampton	Canning Town, London
	Reid; Grassam	Report		Stadium: Memorial Grounds; Attendance: 7,500

29 September 1900 4	West Ham United	1–2	Bristol City	Canning Town, London
	Kaye	Report		Stadium: Memorial Grounds; Attendance: 5,000

6 October 1900 5	Swindon Town	0–1	West Ham United	Swindon
		Report	Corbett	Stadium: County Ground; Attendance: 2,000

13 October 1900 6	West Ham United	2–0	Watford	Canning Town, London
	Corbett; Fenton	Report		Stadium: Memorial Grounds; Attendance: 4,000

20 October 1900 7	Luton Town	2–0	West Ham United	Luton
		Report		Stadium: Dunstable Road; Attendance: 4,000

27 October 1900 8	Tottenham Hotspur	0–0	West Ham United	Tottenham, London
		Report		Stadium: White Hart Lane; Attendance: 6,000

10 November 1900 9	Portsmouth	3–2	West Ham United	Portsmouth
		Report	Reid; Kaye	Stadium: Fratton Park; Attendance: 5,000

24 November 1900 10	Bristol Rovers	2–0	West Ham United	Bristol
		Report		Stadium: Eastville Stadium; Attendance: 3,000

1 December 1900 11	West Ham United	1–0	Reading	Canning Town, London
	Ratcliffe	Report		Stadium: Memorial Grounds; Attendance: 4,000

15 December 1900 12	Gravesend United	0–0	West Ham United	Gravesend
		Report		Stadium: Overcliffe Ground; Attendance: 1,000

29 December 1900 13	Southampton	3–2	West Ham United	Southampton
		Report	Hunt; Fenton	Stadium: The Dell; Attendance: 4,000

12 January 1901 14	Bristol City	1–0	West Ham United	Bristol
		Report		Stadium: St John's Lane; Attendance: 2,500

19 January 1901 15	West Ham United	3–1	Swindon Town	Canning Town, London
	Corbett (2); Grassam	Report		Stadium: Memorial Grounds; Attendance: 4,000

26 January 1901 16	Watford	0–1	West Ham United	Watford
		Report	Grassam	Stadium: Cassio Road; Attendance: 2,000

9 February 1901 17	West Ham United	2–0	Luton Town	Canning Town, London
	Corbett; Taylor	Report		Stadium: Memorial Grounds; Attendance: 1,000

16 February 1901 18	West Ham United	1–4	Tottenham Hotspur	Canning Town, London
	Grassam	Report		Stadium: Memorial Grounds; Attendance: 5,500

23 February 1901 19	Queens Park Rangers	0–2	West Ham United	Kensal Rise, London
		Report	Grassam; Taylor	Stadium: Kensal Rise Athletic Ground; Attendance: 6,000

2 March 1901 20	West Ham United	1–1	Portsmouth	Canning Town, London
	McEachrane	Report		Stadium: Memorial Grounds; Attendance: 3,000

9 March 1901 21	New Brompton	1–1	West Ham United	Gillingham
		Report	Hunt	Stadium: Priestfield Stadium; Attendance: 2,000

16 March 1901 22	West Ham United	2–0	Bristol Rovers	Canning Town, London
	Grassam; Corbett	Report		Stadium: Memorial Grounds; Attendance: 4,000

21 March 1901 23	West Ham United	1–0	Millwall Athletic	Canning Town, London
	Corbett	Report		Stadium: Memorial Grounds; Attendance: 2,500

23 March 1901 24	Kettering Town	0–1	West Ham United	Kettering
		Report	Grassam	Attendance: 1,000

30 March 1901 25	West Ham United	1–1	Kettering Town	Canning Town, London
	Taylor	Report		Stadium: Memorial Grounds; Attendance: 2,000

5 April 1901 26	West Ham United	2–1	Queens Park Rangers	Canning Town, London
	George Ratcliffe (2)	Report		Stadium: Memorial Grounds; Attendance: 4,000

10 April 1901 27	Reading	3–1	West Ham United	Reading
	Grassam	Report		Stadium: Elm Park; Attendance: 1,000

20 April 1901 28	West Ham United	2–0	New Brompton	Canning Town, London
	George Ratcliffe; Taylor	Report		Stadium: Memorial Grounds; Attendance: 2,000

=== FA Cup ===
==== Matches ====
3 November 1900 3rd Qualifying	West Ham United	1–0	Olympic	Canning Town, London
	Fenton	Report		Stadium: Memorial Grounds; Attendance: 3,000

17 November 1900 4th Qualifying	New Brompton	1–1	West Ham United	Gillingham
	Corbett	Report		Stadium: Priestfield; Attendance: 1,200

21 November 1900 4th Qualifying (replay)	West Ham United	4–1	New Brompton	Canning Town, London
	Kaye (2); Corbett; Hunt	Report		Stadium: Memorial Grounds; Attendance: 1,200

8 December 1900 5th Qualifying	West Ham United	1–1	Clapton Orient	Canning Town, London
	Kaye	Report		Stadium: Memorial Grounds; Attendance: 10,000

12 December 1900 5th Qualifying (replay)	Clapton Orient	2–3	West Ham United	Lower Clapton, London
		Report	Grassam (3)	Stadium: Millfields Road; Attendance: 5,000

5 January 1901 Intermediate	West Ham United	0–1	Liverpool	Canning Town, London
		Report		Stadium: Memorial Grounds; Attendance: 6,000

== Bibliography ==
- Belton, Brian (2006). West Ham United Miscellany. Pennant Books. ISBN 978-0-9550394-4-7.
- Blows, Kirk; Hogg, Tony (2000). The Essential History of West Ham United. Headline. ISBN 978-0-7472-7036-2.
- Hogg, Tony (2005). Who's Who of West Ham United. Profile Sports Media. ISBN 978-1-903135-50-1.
- Korr, Charles (2005) [1986]. West Ham United: The Making of a Football Club. Gerald Duckworth & Co. ISBN 978-0-7156-2143-1.
- Northcutt, John; Marsh, Steve (2015). West Ham United: The Complete Record. deCoubertin Books. ISBN 978-1-909245-27-3.
- Powles, John (2005). Iron in the Blood. Nottingham: SoccerData. ISBN 1-899468-22-6. Archived from the original on 12 January 2018.
- Powles, John (2008). Irons of the South. Nottingham: SoccerData. ISBN 978-1-905891-08-5.
