= Archie Annan =

Scottish footballer

Personal information
- Full name: Walter Archibald Annan
- Date of birth: 23 March 1877
- Place of birth: Wilsontown, Carnwath, Lanarkshire
- Date of death: 23 January 1949 (aged 71)
- Place of death: South Gloucestershire, England
- Height: 5 ft 10 in (1.78 m)
- Position: Full back

Senior career*
Years	Team	Apps	(Gls)
1899–1900	West Calder		
1900–1902	St Bernard's		
1902–1904	Sunderland	1	(0)
1904–1905	Sheffield United	27	(0)
1904–1911	Bristol City	143	(0)
1911–1912	Burslem Port Vale	7	(0)

Managerial career
- 1912–19??: Mid Rhondda
- * Club domestic league appearances and goals

Walter Archibald Annan (23 March 1877 – 23 January 1949) was a Scottish professional footballer in the years before World War I. A full back, he made over 170 appearances in the English Football League. He featured prominently in Bristol City's successes in the first decade of the 20th century under manager Harry Thickitt. He also played for Sunderland, Sheffield United, and Burslem Port Vale. He helped Bristol City to the Second Division title in 1905–06, a second-place finish in the First Division in 1906–07, and also played in the FA Cup final in 1909.

== Playing career ==
=== Early career ===
Born in Carnwath, Lanarkshire, he was the youngest of 13 children born to Walter Annan, a colliery manager, and his wife Marion (née Storry). A lifelong teetotaller, Annan joined local club West Calder in August 1899, before moving onto Edinburgh club St Bernard's in May 1900. No Scottish league appearances are recorded for either club. In April 1902 he moved to Sunderland in the First Division of the English Football League. He made a solitary appearance at right-back in a 2–1 win over Notts County on 4 April 1903, in a season when Sunderland finished third, only a single point behind champions Sheffield Wednesday. In January 1904 he moved on to Sheffield United and made his league debut for the "Blades" at left-back in a 2–0 defeat at Everton on 9 January 1904. He made a total of nine appearances as a full-back, deputising for Harry Thickitt and Boyle in 1903–04. Annan made 18 appearances in 1904–05, as United finished sixth in the First Division.

=== Bristol City ===
Annan followed manager Harry Thickitt to Ashton Gate for £200 in April 1905. When Bristol City finished as Second Division champions in 1905–06, Annan was ever-present with 38 appearances at right-back and formed a notable defensive full-back partnership with Joe Cottle. Ever present again for a second successive season in 1906–07, City finished the campaign as runners-up in the First Division. Annan played just 13 games in 1907–08 as new signing Bob Young was preferred at right-back. In 1908–09, Annan replaced Young as the regular right-back, making 26 appearances and playing in all 10 FA Cup ties, including the 1909 FA Cup final – City lost the final 1–0 to Manchester United at Crystal Palace. He made 28 appearances in 1909–10, and was again replaced by Bob Young in the later stages of the season. Annan did not feature in the City team in the 1910–11 season, as Bristol City were relegated back to the Second Division. The final league match of the season, a 1–0 defeat to Everton on 29 April 1911, was awarded as a joint benefit for Arthur Spear and Archie Annan, although neither played in the game.

=== Burslem Port Vale ===
In July 1911, Annan moved onto Burslem Port Vale. He made his debut at the Athletic Ground in a 1–0 win over Oldham Athletic Reserves on 4 September. He injured himself in a match against Crewe Alexandra twelve days later. He failed to hold onto his first-team place upon his recovery and was released at the end of the 1911–12 season after picking up a Central League runners-up medal.

== Managerial career ==
Annan was appointed manager of Welsh Southern Football League club Mid Rhondda in July 1911, where he was assisted by former Bristol City colleagues Joe Cottle and Bill Demmery. He subsequently returned to Bristol City in March 1921 and spent five years as coach at the club. He was later a police constable stationed at St George in Bristol.

== Career statistics ==
Appearances and goals by club, season and competition
Club	Season	League			FA Cup		Total	
Club	Season	Division	Apps	Goals	Apps	Goals	Apps	Goals
Sunderland	1902–03	First Division	1	0	0	0	1	0
Sheffield United	1903–04	First Division	9	0	0	0	9	0
Sheffield United	1904–05	First Division	18	0	1	0	19	0
Sheffield United	Total		27	0	1	0	28	0
Bristol City	1905–06	Second Division	38	0	1	0	39	0
Bristol City	1906–07	First Division	38	0	2	0	40	0
Bristol City	1907–08	First Division	13	0	2	0	15	0
Bristol City	1908–09	First Division	26	0	10	0	36	0
Bristol City	1909–10	First Division	28	0	3	0	31	0
Bristol City	Total		143	0	18	0	161	0
Burslem Port Vale	1911–12	Central League	7	0	0	0	7	0
Career total			178	0	19	0	197	0

== Honours ==
Bristol City

- Football League Second Division: 1905–06
- FA Cup runner-up: 1909
