= Reuben Marr =

English footballer

Personal information
- Full name: Reuben Charles Marr
- Date of birth: 2nd Q, 1884
- Place of birth: Doncaster, England
- Date of death: 5 March 1961
- Place of death: Bristol, England
- Position: Half back

Senior career*
| Years | Team | Apps | (Gls) |
| ????–1906 | Mexborough Town | | |
| 1906–1920 | Bristol City | 178 | (11) |
- * Club domestic league appearances and goals

Reuben Charles Marr (1884 – 5 March 1961) was an English professional association football player in the years prior to and shortly after the First World War. He made over 170 appearances in the Football League.

== Career ==
Born in Balby, Doncaster, Marr played for local club Mexborough Town in Yorkshire before being signed by Harry Thickett in July 1906 for Bristol City in the Second Division. He made his league debut at right half in 2–2 draw at Birmingham City on 3 September 1906 making 30 appearances scoring 3 goals and establishing himself at right half for the "Robins" who finished runners up in the First Division. In the following four seasons in the First Division Marr briefly shared the right half position with Arthur Spear and Pat Hanlin making 24 appearances in 1907–08, 18 appearances in 1908–09 and played in all 9 FA Cup ties preceding but missed the 1909 FA Cup Final when Pat Hanlin played as City lost 0–1 to Manchester United at the Crystal Palace ground, the only final appearance to date by Bristol City. He made 25 appearances scoring three goals in 1909-10 and played regularly with 30 appearances and two goals in 1910–11 the season when Bristol City were relegated back to the Second Division.

Many of the First Division side retired or left the club in 1911 but Marr and Billy Wedlock remained in the half back line playing in the Second Division. Marr made 33 appearances scoring three goals in 1911-12 but only 9 appearances with one goal in 1912-13 before Bob Young took over as the regular right half. The league match on 8 February 1913 a 3–3 draw v Burnley was awarded as a benefit for Marr although he did not play in the game. Marr made a final 9 appearances in 1919-20 deputising for Billy Wedlock and "Jock" Nicholson before retiring in May 1920.

== Honours ==
with Bristol City

- Football League First Division runner-up: 1906–07
