= Fred Staniforth =

English footballer

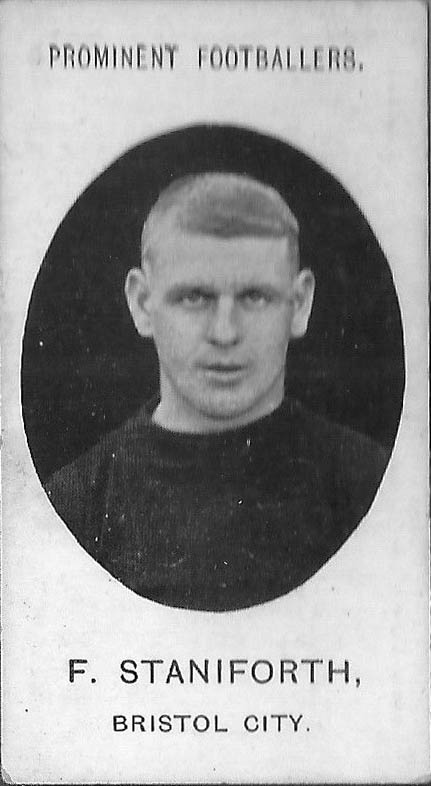

Personal information
- Full name: Frederick Walter Staniforth
- Date of birth: 23 November 1884
- Place of birth: Kilnhurst, England
- Date of death: 23 May 1955 (aged 70–71)
- Place of death: Bristol, England
- Position: Outside right

Senior career*
Years	Team	Apps	(Gls)
- Kilnhurst Town
- Rotherham Main
–1906	Mexborough Town		
1906–1910	Bristol City	134	(14)
1910–1912	Grimsby Town	67	(8)
1913–1913	Liverpool	3	(0)
- * Club domestic league appearances and goals

Frederick Walter Staniforth (23 November 1884 – 23 May 1955) was an English footballer who played as an outside right. He made over 200 appearances in Football League in the years prior to the First World War.

== Career ==
Fred Staniforth was born in Kilnhurst near Rotherham to Elijah Farewell Staniforth, a miner, and Elizabeth (née Wilson). He played locally for Kilnhurst Town, Rotherham Main and Mexborough Town in Yorkshire. Harry Thickett signed Fred Staniforth in July 1906 from Mexborough Town for Bristol City Bristol City had just been promoted to the First Division as Second Division champions. Staniforth replaced Walter Bennett to make his First Division debut on the right wing in a 0–2 defeat at Everton on 6 October 1906. He scored his first goal in his fourth league appearance in a 3–2 win at Notts County. Staniforth made 24 appearances scoring 3 goals in 1906-07 as Bristol City achieved their highest ever League position finishing as First Division runners up to Newcastle United. In 1907-08 Staniforth continued as part of a regular forward line comprising Staniforth, Billy Maxwell, Sam Gilligan, Andy Burton and Frank Hilton. He made 35 appearances scoring 4 goals in 1907-08 when the "Babes" finished in 10th place. The following season in 1908-09 the forward line was broken up as Willis Rippon and Bob Hardy came into the team. Staniforth made 34 appearances scoring 4 goals in the First Division as Bristol City finished in 8th place. He also played in all 10 FA Cup ties as Bristol City reached the FA Cup Final in 1909 for the first and only time. Bristol City slipped to 16th position in the First Division in 1909-10 when Staniforth shared right wing duties with Bob Hardy making 22 appearances scoring 3 goals. Staniforth made 19 appearances without scoring in 1910-11 when Bristol City finished 19th and were relegated to the Second Division. Staniforth lost his regular place on the right wing in October 1910 when City signed Willie Clark from Sunderland but returned for 6 games of the final run of 8 matches.

After his playing career finished Fred Staniforth returned to Bristol and settled there until his death on 23 May 1955.
