= Black Diamonds F.C. =

Defunct association football club from Cumberland, England

- Full name: Black Diamonds Football Club
- Nicknames: the Diamonds, the Pinks/Pink Lads/Pink Uns
- Founded: 1887
- Dissolved: 1904
- Ground: Coronation Ground
Home colours

Black Diamonds F.C. was an association football club from Workington, then in Cumberland, active from 1887 to 1904.

== History ==
Black Diamonds F.C. in 1894. Charlie Satterthwaite, who later played for Liverpool F.C., is bottom right. Peter Chambers, who later played for Blackburn Rovers, is the player to the left of the trophy on the middle row.

The club was founded in 1887 by a group of young football fans from Griffin Street, an area with a "low" reputation and considered by some to be a red light district, who had been inspired by a match between Workington A.F.C. and Distington to start their own affair. The club soon developed a loathing for Workington A.F.C., from a mix of its reliance on non-local players, influence within the Cumberland Football Association which cost the Diamonds the Cumberland Shield (for junior and reserve sides) in 1889–90, and its poaching of a number of Diamonds at the close of the season. The club's players were mostly labourers in the local industries, mostly steelworkers but including coal miners.

=== Local league and cup success ===
The rancour towards Workington came from the Diamonds' third round Shield tie with Old St Michael's in November 1889; the Diamonds already had a reputation for being a "warm lot for the Shield" after an easy win over Workington Reserves, but after a 5–0 win over St Michael's, the Cumberland Association ordered a replay, which St Michael's won 7–6, and, to add injury to insult, the Diamonds played most of the match with 10 men after Penrice had his leg broken. A benefit match at Christmas raised £6 for Penrice.

The club however shrugged off this disappointment to win the Cumberland Shield in 1891–92 (hammering Workington Reserves 7–0 in the final), and losing the final in 1892–93, going down 2–0 to Imperial Rovers at the third time of asking; the Diamonds had won the original final at Workington 3–0, but a replay was ordered owing to "the hardness of the ground", and the replay at Frizington ended 2–2. One notable match in the competition, in 1890–91, was against future rivals Frizington White Stars, and the Diamonds recorded their biggest competitive victory, hammering the Stars 19–0.

The Diamonds therefore stepped up to the Cumberland Senior Cup, and, in 1894, was one of the 8 clubs to form the re-constituted Cumberland Football League, which had been in abeyance after its first season in 1891–92. It finished third in that first season, with 8 wins in 14 matches, but the highlight was winning the Senior Cup for the first time, beating holders Carlisle A.F.C. at Workington's Ashfield ground 2–1, thanks to goals from Satterthwaite and Feenan; the City club's goal came at the death while goalkeeper Brown lay injured.

The club's 1896–97 League season did not have an auspicious start, with an 11–1 defeat at Wigton, but the club turned around its form - including a 6–3 win over Wigton in the return match - to end up as League champions, for the only time; in the decisive match at Workington - who had won every previous title - the Diamonds' goalkeeper Billy Brown had his collarbone broken by Billy Ross, and, with five minutes to go, the Diamonds, with 9 men, were 4–1 down against Workington's 10, but a late goal from Billy McClure and two from Pirie rescued a point.

=== FA Cup shock ===
The club entered the FA Cup for the first time in 1895–96, and continued entering until 1903–04. The first of its two wins in the competition came in the first qualifying round in 1897–98, a 2–0 victory at Southport Central, with two second-half goals somewhat against the run of play, the first scrambled home from a corner and the second from Billy McClure, following up a save by Abram. Confident of victory, the Centralites had invited distinguished guests in the form of Liberal politicians Sir George and Lady Pilkington, and Sir Herbert Naylor-Leyland; none of them stayed until the end. In the second qualifying round, the Diamonds were drawn at home to Blackburn Park Road; McClure left for Burton Swifts before the first match, on the Cricket Field, which ended 1–1, and the Diamonds went down 3–2 after extra time in the replay. Two of the Diamonds - half-back Peter Chambers and forward Daniel Hurst - had proved so impressive in the ties that Blackburn Rovers signed them up in the aftermath.

=== Near misses ===
The club came close to adding a second League title in 1899–1900; the Pinks played all ten of their fixtures, earning 17 points from 8 wins and a draw, but the Association deducted 2 points for fielding an ineligible player. Reigning champion Frizington White Stars were on 11 points from 7 matches, but Carlisle Red Rose and Shaddongate United - whom the Stars were due to play - announced they could not fulfil their remaining fixtures, and the de facto championship match between the Diamonds and the Stars ended in a draw. The Association nevertheless decided to award the title to Frizington, in effect awarding it 6 points for the unfulfilled fixtures. The club's consolation was its second and final triumph in the Senior Cup, beating Workington 3–2 in a thriller at Moss Bay; the Diamonds had a three goal lead at half-time, but Connor scored two goals in the first three minutes of the second half, but the Pinks hung on to win.

The Diamonds were also runner-up to the same club the following season. The Pinks gained a slight revenge over the Stars in the 1902–03 FA Cup qualifying rounds by beating them 3–2 in a replay at the new Coronation Park, A. James' hat-trick earning him a prize of a pair of football boots, offered by local bootmaker Messrs Tyler.

=== End of the club ===
The club had adopted professionalism in 1902, more as a precautionary measure to prevent the "poaching" of non-contracted players, but the extra expense caused the club problems, and it came to a sudden end in 1904. At the end of the 1903–04 season, the Football Association suspended the club for not having paid £4 in expenses to Workington, and for not responding to correspondence. The Cumberland FA had already imposed a fine and suspension on the club, its directors, its members, and even its ground for not turning up to a Cumberland League match at Shaddongate United. At the time the club ceased operation, it was second in the Cumberland League, although soon overtaken by Shaddongate, who had several games in hand, and had recently lost 5–0 at home to Maryport.

The suspension in effect killed the club, as it never paid the fines, and never re-emerged. Indeed, the fine was eventually paid by Workington in September 1904, in order to sign some of the Diamonds' players as they were still under suspension from local football.

== Colours ==
The club wore pink shirts with a black diamond badge.

== Ground ==
The club's first ground was a field provided by the club's first president, R. H. Hodgson. In 1890 it moved to the Band Contest Field, to which it returned in 1901; in between the club played on the Cricket Field. The club moved to the Coronation Ground, on the Cloffocks between the town and the River Derwent, in 1902.

== Notable players ==
- Notable players ( 4 )

== Honours ==
- FA Cup
  - Best performance: 2nd qualifying round, 1897–98, 1902–03
- Cumberland League
  - Winner: 1896–97
  - Runner-up: 1899–1900, 1900–01
- Cumberland Senior Cup
  - Winner: 1894–95, 1899–1900
- Cumberland Shield
  - Winner: 1891–92
  - Runner-up: 1892–93
