= Joe Cottle =

English footballer (1886–1958)

Personal information
- Full name: Joseph Richard Cottle
- Date of birth: 4 June 1886
- Place of birth: Bedminster, England
- Date of death: 3 February 1958 (aged 71)
- Place of death: Bristol, England
- Position: Left back

Senior career*
Years	Team	Apps	(Gls)
????–1905	Dolphins (Bristol)		
1905–1911	Bristol City	204	(0)
- Bristol Rovers
??????	Mid Rhondda		

International career
1909	England	1	(0)
- * Club domestic league appearances and goals

Joseph Richard Cottle (4 June 1886 – 3 February 1958) was an England international footballer, who played as a left back prior to the First World War. He played over 200 Football League games for Bristol City before a broken leg halted his City career. He later joined Bristol Rovers.

== Career ==
Born in Bedminster in 1886, Cottle played locally for Dolphins in Bristol before Harry Thickett signed him in June 1905 to play professionally for Bristol City. Cottle made his debut at left back on 30 September 1905 in a 2–1 win at Bradford City. This was the 5th match of a run of 14 successive wins achieved by Bristol City between September and December 1905. Cottle had replaced Billy Tuft in the left back position and retained his place for the rest of the season making 33 appearances as Bristol City won the Second Division championship. Cottle and Archie Annan formed a formidable full back partnership for Bristol City under manager Harry Thickett during the first decade of the 20th century. The following season 1906-07 Cottle missed only one league match making 37 appearances as the "Robins" finished runners up in the First Division. Cottle made 36 appearances in both 1907-08 and 1908-09 missing only 2 league matches in each First Division season. In 1908-09 Cottle also played in all 10 FA Cup ties including the 1909 FA Cup Final as City lost 0–1 to Manchester United at the Crystal Palace, the only time that Bristol City have reached the FA Cup Final. He also earned his one cap for England v Ireland in a 4–0 win at Bradford Park Avenue on 13 February 1909. Cottle was ever present in 1909-10 making 38 appearances. He played in the opening 24 league games of 1910-11 before sustaining a broken leg during a 0–4 defeat at Preston North End on 28 January 1911. Bristol City were relegated back to the Second Division at the end of the season and Cottle left the club in the summer of 1911. There is no mention of Joe Cottle making any appearances for Bristol Rovers in the Southern League. Cottle later joined Mid Rhondda with Bill Demmery the club managed by Archie Annan. Finally Cottle was a publican in Bedminster, Bristol and remained locally until his death in 1958.

== Honours ==
Bristol City

- Football League Second Division champion: 1905–06
- Football League First Division runner-up: 1906–07
- FA Cup runner-up: 1909
