= Arthur Spear =

English footballer

Personal information
- Full name: Arthur Thomas Spear
- Date of birth: 6 February 1883
- Place of birth: Bristol, England
- Date of death: 12 December 1946 (aged 63)
- Place of death: Bath, England
- Position: Half back

Senior career*
Years	Team	Apps	(Gls)
1904–1911	Bristol City	136	(1)
- * Club domestic league appearances and goals

Arthur Spear (6 February 1883 – 12 December 1946) was an English professional association football player in the years prior to the First World War. He made over 130 appearances in The Football League.

== Career ==
Born in Bristol, Spear featured prominently in Bristol City's successes in the first decade of the 20th century under Manager Harry Thickett. He played for local clubs in Bristol before in July 1904 he moved to Bristol City in the Second Division. He made his league debut in 1–0 win at Glossop on 27 December 1904, making 12 appearances at half back deputising for Peter Chambers and Billy Jones in 1904–05 for the "Robins" who finished fourth in the Second Division. When Bristol City finished as Second Division champions in the following season, Spear contributed his only goal in the promotion-clinching 2–0 win versus Leeds City on 14 April 1906. By the end of this campaign he had made 24 appearances, after taking over from Billy Jones at right half during the second half of the season. In the following two seasons in Division One, Spear shared the right half position with Reuben Marr making 15 appearances in 1906–07 as City finished runners up and 23 appearances in 1907–08. Spear, Reuben Marr and Pat Hanlin shared the wing half duties in the next two seasons both spent in the First Division. In 1908–09, Spear made 33 appearances mainly at left half and played in all 10 FA Cup ties including the 1909 FA Cup Final losing 0–1 to Manchester United at the Crystal Palace ground, the only final appearance to date by Bristol City. He made his final three appearances in 1910–11 the season when Bristol City were relegated back to the Second Division before retiring. The final league match of 1910–11 on 29 April 1911 a 0–1 defeat v Everton was awarded as a joint benefit for Spear and Archie Annan although neither played in the game. After retiring in 1914 Arthur Spear ran a pub, the Golden Fleece, in Bath where he died in 1946.

== Honours ==
with Bristol City

- Football League Second Division champion: 1905–06
- Football League First Division runner-up: 1906–07
- FA Cup runner-up: 1909
