= Pat Hanlin =

Scottish footballer

Personal information
- Full name: Patrick Hanlin
- Date of birth: 15 December 1881
- Place of birth: West Calder, Edinburgh, Scotland
- Date of death: 22 March 1965 (aged 83)
- Place of death: Dunfermline, Scotland
- Position: Half back

Senior career*
Years	Team	Apps	(Gls)
- Burnbank Athletic
–1905	Everton		
1905–1911	Bristol City	162	(3)

International career
- Scotland junior
- * Club domestic league appearances and goals

Patrick Hanlin (15 December 1881 – 22 March 1965) was a Scottish junior international and Scottish professional association football player in the years prior to the First World War. He made over 160 appearances in The Football League.

== Career ==
Born in Cambuslang in Scotland, Hanlin featured prominently in Bristol City's successes in the first decade of the 20th century under Manager Harry Thickett. He played for local clubs in Scotland including Burnbank Athletic before joining Everton but never made a first team appearance for the First Division team. Harry Thickett signed Hanlin in July 1905 for Bristol City in the Second Division. He made his league debut in a 2–1 win at Bradford City on 30 September 1905 during the record run of 14 successive league wins by Bristol City. Hanlin made 14 appearances at wing back replacing Peter Chambers in 1905–06 for the "Robins" when Bristol City finished as Second Division champions. In the next season in the First Division Hanlin contributed 3 goals from 36 appearances as the regular left half missing only two league games in 1906–07 as City finished as First Division runners up. Hanlin made a further 34 appearances in 1907–08 as the regular left half. Arthur Spear, Reuben Marr and Pat Hanlin shared the wing half duties in the next two seasons both spent in the First Division. In 1908–09, Hanlin made 22 appearances mainly at left half and played in none of the nine FA Cup ties before the final but appeared at right half in the 1909 FA Cup Final losing 0–1 to Manchester United at the Crystal Palace ground, the only final appearance to date by Bristol City. He made 24 appearances at wing half in 1909–10 and was the regular left half with 32 appearances, missing only six matches, in 1910–11 the season when Bristol City were relegated back to the Second Division before leaving City in the summer of 1911. He returned to Scotland, retired from professional football, and lived quietly until his death in Dunfermline, on 22 March 1965

== Honours ==
with Bristol City

- Football League Second Division champion: 1905–06
- Football League First Division runner-up: 1906–07
- FA Cup runner-up: 1909
