= Moss Bay Exchange F.C. =

English football club

- Full name: Moss Bay Exchange Football Club
- Nickname: the Bays
- Founded: 1889
- Dissolved: 1917
- Ground: Westfield
Home colours

Moss Bay Exchange F.C., occasionally rendered as Mossbay Exchange, was an English association football club based in the Mossbay area of Workington, Cumberland.

== History ==
The club was founded at a meeting at the Moss Bay Hotel, on the Harrington Road in Workington, on 26 October 1889. The club was elected as a member of the Football Association in May 1891 along with nine other teams. Moss Bay Exchange entered the FA Cup for the first time in the 1895–96 season, and were drawn to play Black Diamonds in their first ever match in the competition. The team progressed to the Second Qualifying Round before being eliminated by Oswaldtwistle Rovers. Moss Bay Exchange reached that stage of the Cup on three more occasions, in 1899–1900, 1901–02 and 1903–04, their final FA Cup appearance.

The club won the Cumberland Shield for junior sides in 1890–91, beating Frizington Rovers on the Workington Cricket Field 4–3 with a late winner, so stepped up to the Cumberland Senior Cup, and was finalist three years in a row; winning in 1891–92 and 1892–93, and runner-up in 1893–94 and 1897–98. The club's win over Workington in the 1892 final was the first time the Reds had not won the tournament since 1886, and the 4–3 was put down by an ungallant Workington media to a strong wind in the second half, although the half-time score - when the wind had been against the Bays - was 2–2. The following season, the Bays beat the Reds in the semi-final, and survived a protest on the basis that one player (Macmillan) was ineligible for the competition, and that the referee was "totally incompetent". The protest was thrown out as frivolous.

== Colours ==
The club's original colours were navy and white striped shirts with white knickers. By 1894 the club had changed to amber and black vertical striped shirts.

== Ground ==
The club first played at Moor Close Farm. By 1891 it had moved to the Westfield enclosure.
