= Daniel Hurst =

English footballer

Dan Hurst
Personal information
- Full name: Daniel James Hurst
- Date of birth: 2 October 1876
- Place of birth: Workington, Cumberland, England
- Date of death: 1961 (aged 84–85)
- Place of death: Liverpool, England
- Position: Outside left

Senior career*
Years	Team	Apps	(Gls)
- Black Diamonds
1897–1900	Blackburn Rovers	53	(17)
1900–1901	Workington		
1901–1902	Manchester City	15	(0)
1902–1903	Manchester United	16	(4)

International career
	Football League	1	(0)
- * Club domestic league appearances and goals

Daniel James Hurst (2 October 1876 – 1961) was an English footballer. Born in Workington, Cumberland (now Cumbria), his regular position was as an outside left. He began his football career with local club Black Diamonds, but joined Lancashire side Blackburn Rovers in 1897 at the age of 20, along with left half Peter Chambers. After three years with Blackburn, during which time he scored 17 goals in 53 league games and was selected for a Football League XI, Hurst returned to Cumberland in 1900 to join his hometown club, Workington. A year later, he re-entered the Football League with Manchester City, playing 15 times in his season there, before joining the newly renamed Manchester United in 1902. He made his debut for Manchester United away to Gainsborough Trinity on 6 September 1902, before then scoring in three consecutive games, against Burton United, Bristol City and Glossop. His only other goal for the club came in a 3–1 win over Lincoln City on 8 November 1902. He left Manchester United at the end of the 1902–03 season, before retiring from football.

Hurst married Emily Borthwick Cretney in Workington on 18 December 1898. They had three children: Catherine Hurst (born c. 1899–1900), Daniel James Hurst Jr. (born c. 1902–03) and Mary Millington Hurst (born c. 1907–08). After his retirement from football, Hurst worked as an engineman on a blast furnace.
