= Frank Hilton =

English footballer

Personal information
- Full name: Francis Hilton
- Date of birth: 28 March 1882
- Place of birth: Worsbrough, England
- Date of death: 28 July 1956 (aged 74)
- Place of death: Leeds, England
- Position: Winger

Senior career*
| Years | Team | Apps | (Gls) |
| –1905 | Doncaster St Johns | | |
| 1905–1910 | Bristol City | 116 | (21) |
| 1910-1912 | Rotherham Town | ? | (?) |

International career
| 1907 | Football League | 1 | (0) |
- * Club domestic league appearances and goals

Frank Hilton (28 March 1882 - 28 July 1956) was an English professional association football player in the years prior to the First World War. He made over 110 appearances in The Football League and one appearance for the Football League representative team in 1907.

== Early life ==
Born at Worsbrough, two miles south of Barnsley, Yorkshire, Hilton's family moved to the Balby area of Doncaster when he was a child.

== Career ==
Hilton featured prominently in Bristol City's successes in the first decade of the 20th century under Manager Harry Thickett. He played for local club Doncaster St Johns in Yorkshire before Harry Thickett signed him in July 1905 for Bristol City in the Second Division.

He made his league debut in 3–0 win at Lincoln City on 28 October 1905 when Bristol City were in the midst of a record run of 14 successive league wins. Hilton made 26 appearances scoring five goals at outside left replacing Freddie Fenton in 1905–06 when Bristol City finished Second Division champions. In the next season 1906–07 when Bristol City finished as runners up in the First Division, Hilton contributed four goals from 32 appearances on the left wing. In the following two seasons in the First Division, Hilton was the regular outside left making 30 appearances scoring five goals in 1907–08 and 27 appearances scoring seven goals in 1908–09. Although not a prolific goalscorer, Hilton scored goals in four successive First Division matches, all won by Bristol City, during December 1908.

Hilton became the first Bristol City player to be honoured by the Football League, playing and scoring in the representative XI in a 6–3 win over the Irish League at Roker Park on 12 October 1907. In 1908–09, Hilton played in only four of the ten FA Cup ties but this included the 1909 FA Cup Final losing 0–1 to Manchester United at the Crystal Palace ground, the only final appearance to date by Bristol City. He made his final league appearance in 1909–10 in the 1–3 defeat at Newcastle United on 23 October 1909.

Hilton left Bristol City in the summer of 1910 before the 1910–11 season when Bristol City were relegated back to the Second Division. On 30 July 1910 Sheffield sports paper the Star Green 'Un announced that Frank Hilton had signed for Rotherham Town, then of the Midland League. The 1911 UK census confirmed Hilton's occupation as a "professional footballer", listed under his formal name "Francis Hilton", and showed that he had returned to his parents house at 56 Carr Hill, Balby, Doncaster. Hilton's football career at Rotherham Town has not been traced any further than 1912 - newspapers of the day reveal that he was still playing for them as recently as the first half of the 1912/13 season.

When his playing days drew to a close, he became a licensed victualler and hotel owner in Yorkshire - firstly in Doncaster (until the early 1930s), then later in the Sheffield area. He married Phyllis Marian Beckett in Doncaster on 18 February 1914, and died at Leeds in 1956 - at the age of 74 . The 1939 England and Wales Register shows the Hiltons living at 22 Watsons Walk, Sheffield. Frank's occupation is given as a "Licensed Victualler of Hotel, Proprietor & Caterer". It also revealed Frank's stated date of birth - March 28, 1882.

== Honours ==
With Bristol City

- Football League Second Division champion: 1905–06
- Football League First Division runner-up: 1906–07
- FA Cup runner-up: 1909
