= Bob Hardy =

Bob Hardy may refer to:

- Bob Hardy (footballer) (1914–1960), played for Hemsworth West End, South Kirkby Colliery, White Rose, Rotherham Utd, Mexborough Athletic, Denaby Utd, Dinnington Main Colliery Welfare, Rochdale, Grantham
- Bob Hardy (bishop) (1936–2021), bishop of Lincoln
- Bob Hardy (bassist) (born 1980), member of British band Franz Ferdinand
