= Albert Kaye =

English footballer (1872–1935)

Personal information
- Date of birth: 30 April 1872
- Place of birth: Staveley, England
- Date of death: 16 September 1935 (aged 63)
- Place of death: Mansfield, England
- Positions: Centre-forward; inside forward

Senior career*
Years	Team	Apps	(Gls)
- Staveley
- Eckington
1897–1899	Sheffield Wednesday	41	(12)
1899–1900	Chatham		
1900–1901	West Ham United	14	(2)
1901–?	Distillery		
1903–1904	Stockport County	16	(2)
- * Club domestic league appearances and goals

Albert Kaye (30 April 1872 – 16 September 1935) was an English professional footballer who played as a centre-forward in the Football League for Sheffield Wednesday and Stockport County. He also played for Chatham, West Ham United, and Distillery.

Kaye played for Staveley and Eckington before joining Sheffield Wednesday for the 1897–98 season.

After a spell at Chatham, he joined West Ham United along with Walter Tranter for the start of their inaugural season of 1900–01. There, he played mainly as inside-left, appearing once as a centre-forward and twice as left-winger. He was part of the team that played in West Ham's first fixture against Gravesend United, which the Hammers won 7–0. In all, he made 14 Southern League First Division and six FA Cup appearances for the east London club, his final appearance coming on 12 January 1901 against Bristol City. In June 1901, he and Tranter joined Belfast club Distillery.

He returned to England and League football with Stockport County in 1903.
