= Harry Clay =

English footballer

Personal information
- Date of birth: 29 January 1881
- Place of birth: Kimberley, England
- Date of death: 9 August 1964 (aged 83)
- Place of death: Bristol, England
- Position: Goalkeeper

Senior career*
Years	Team	Apps	(Gls)
????–1901	Kimberley St John's		
1901–1913	Bristol City	310	(0)
- * Club domestic league appearances and goals

Henry A. Clay (29 January 1881 – 9 August 1964) was an English professional association football player in the years prior to the First World War. He made 310 appearances in the Football League and 32 appearances in the FA Cup for his only professional club, Bristol City.

== Career ==
Born in Kimberley, Nottinghamshire, he began his career with local hometown club Kimberley St Johns before Bristol City manager Sam Hollis signed him in November 1901 for Bristol City. Clay made his league debut for Bristol City v Chesterfield on 7 Dec 1901 and made 23 appearances as City finished 6th of 18 teams in the Second Division. Ever present with 34 appearances in the next three successive seasons 1902–03, 1903-04 & 1904-05 when City rose to 4th place on each occasion. Season 1905-06 saw City finish top of the Second Division table as Clay played in 36 of the 38 league matches. With City promoted to the First Division in 1906-07 Clay played only 8 games as William Demmery was the goalkeeper who won the League runners up medal. Clay played 11 matches in season 1907-08 when Albert Edward Talbot-Lewis was the regular goalkeeper. Clay returned to the side in season 1908-09 making 37 appearances for the "Robins" and played all rounds of the FA Cup and in the 1909 FA Cup Final defeat by Manchester United played at the Crystal Palace. He played regularly 29 appearances in 1909-10 and 28 appearances in 1910-11 when City were relegated after finishing 19th out of 20 clubs in the First Division. Clay made further league appearances in the Second Division, 25 appearances in 1911-12 and 12 appearances the following season. He played his final match on 16 Nov 1912 for Bristol City v Blackpool in a 0–0 draw before retiring in 1913.

He served in the Army in the First World War and was then groundsman at BAC, Filton and Canford Park, Westbury on Trym in Bristol.

== Honours ==
with Bristol City

- Football League Second Division champion: 1905–06
- FA Cup runner-up: 1909
