= 1908–09 FA Cup =

Tournament details
- Country: England; Wales

Final positions
- Champions: Manchester United (1st title)
- Runners-up: Bristol City

The 1908–09 FA Cup was the 38th staging of the world's oldest association football competition, the Football Association Challenge Cup (more usually known as the FA Cup). Manchester United won the competition for the first time, beating Bristol City 1–0 in the final at Crystal Palace, through a goal from Sandy Turnbull.

Matches were scheduled to be played at the stadium of the team named first on the date specified for each round, which was always a Saturday. If scores were level after 90 minutes had been played, a replay would take place at the stadium of the second-named team later the same week. If the replayed match was drawn further replays would be held at neutral venues until a winner was determined. If scores were level after 90 minutes had been played in a replay, a 30-minute period of extra time would be played.

== Calendar ==
The format of the FA Cup for the season had two preliminary rounds, five qualifying rounds, four proper rounds, and the semi-finals and final.

Round	Date
Extra preliminary round	Saturday 12 September 1908
Preliminary round	Saturday 19 September 1908
First qualifying round	Saturday 3 October 1908
Second qualifying round	Saturday 17 October 1908
Third qualifying round	Saturday 7 November 1908
Fourth qualifying round	Saturday 21 November 1908
Fifth qualifying round	Saturday 5 December 1908
First round proper	Saturday 16 January 1909
Second round	Saturday 6 February 1909
Third round	Saturday 20 February 1909
Fourth round	Saturday 6 March 1909
Semifinals	Saturday 27 March 1909
Final	Saturday 24 April 1909

== Qualifying rounds ==
An extra preliminary round of seven ties, featuring 14 clubs from the north-west of England, was required at the beginning of this year's tournament to accommodate the growing popularity of association football in that region. The round included former Football League side Darwen and future League members Southport, Nelson and Macclesfield Town but Colne was the most successful club from this stage, progressing to the third qualifying round before losing to Accrington Stanley (after two replays).

The 12 teams winning through to the competition proper from the fifth qualifying round were Gainsborough Trinity and Chesterfield from the Football League Second Division, along with non-league sides Carlisle United, Wrexham, Luton Town, Workington, Croydon Common, Hastings & St Leonards United, Lincoln City, Exeter City, Watford and Kettering. Exeter City and Croydon Common were making their first appearances in the main draw, while Wrexham had not successfully navigated the qualifying rounds since 1888-89 and Workington had not featured in the first round since 1887-88. Workington's success also meant that, for the first time, two clubs from Cumberland were featuring in the main FA Cup competition.

== First round proper ==
37 of the 40 clubs from the First and Second divisions joined the 12 clubs who came through the qualifying rounds. Of the League sides not given byes to this stage, Bradford Park Avenue was entered in the fourth qualifying round, but lost to Croydon Common in the fifth qualifying round, while Chesterfield and Gainsborough Trinity were entered in the fifth qualifying round.

Fifteen other non-league sides were given byes to the first round to bring the total number of teams up to 64. These were:

Southampton Millwall Athletic Queens Park Rangers Crystal Palace Swindon Town	Plymouth Argyle Reading Portsmouth Northampton Town Bristol Rovers	Norwich City West Ham United Brighton & Hove Albion Stoke Brentford

Stoke, having resigned from the Football League, was competing in the Birmingham & District League while the rest were Southern League First Division members.

32 matches were scheduled to be played on Saturday, 16 January 1909, except for one game which was played three days later. Ten matches were drawn and went to replays in the following midweek fixture, of which one went to a second replay.

Tie no	Home team	Score	Away team	Date
1	Birmingham	2–5	Portsmouth	16 January 1909
2	Blackpool	2–0	Hastings & St Leonards United	16 January 1909
3	Chesterfield	0–2	Glossop	16 January 1909
4	Bristol City	1–1	Southampton	16 January 1909
Replay	Southampton	0–2	Bristol City	20 January 1909
5	Bury	8–0	Kettering	16 January 1909
6	Liverpool	5–1	Lincoln City	16 January 1909
7	Preston North End	1–0	Middlesbrough	16 January 1909
8	Watford	1–1	Leicester Fosse	16 January 1909
Replay	Leicester Fosse	3–1	Watford	20 January 1909
9	Notts County	0–1	Blackburn Rovers	16 January 1909
10	Nottingham Forest	2–0	Aston Villa	16 January 1909
11	The Wednesday	5–0	Stoke	16 January 1909
12	Grimsby Town	0–2	Stockport County	16 January 1909
13	Wolverhampton Wanderers	2–2	Crystal Palace	16 January 1909
Replay	Crystal Palace	4–2	Wolverhampton Wanderers	21 January 1909
14	West Bromwich Albion	3–1	Bolton Wanderers	16 January 1909
15	Luton Town	1–2	Millwall Athletic	16 January 1909
16	Everton	3–1	Barnsley	16 January 1909
17	Wrexham	1–1	Exeter City	16 January 1909
Replay	Exeter City	2–1	Wrexham	20 January 1909
18	Sheffield United	2–3	Sunderland	16 January 1909
19	Newcastle United	5–0	Clapton Orient	16 January 1909
20	Manchester City	3–4	Tottenham Hotspur	16 January 1909
21	Queens Park Rangers	0–0	West Ham United	16 January 1909
Replay	West Ham United	1–0	Queens Park Rangers	20 January 1909
22	Fulham	4–1	Carlisle United	16 January 1909
23	Brentford	2–0	Gainsborough Trinity	16 January 1909
24	Bristol Rovers	1–4	Burnley	16 January 1909
25	Northampton Town	1–1	Derby County	16 January 1909
Replay	Derby County	4–2	Northampton Town	20 January 1909
26	Manchester United	1–0	Brighton & Hove Albion	16 January 1909
27	Norwich City	0–0	Reading	16 January 1909
Replay	Reading	1–1	Norwich City	20 January 1909
Replay	Norwich City	3–2	Reading	25 January 1909
28	Plymouth Argyle	1–0	Swindon Town	16 January 1909
29	Bradford City	2–0	Workington	19 January 1909
30	Hull City	1–1	Chelsea	16 January 1909
Replay	Chelsea	1–0	Hull City	20 January 1909
31	Oldham Athletic	1–1	Leeds City	16 January 1909
Replay	Leeds City	2–0	Oldham Athletic	20 January 1909
32	Croydon Common	1–1	Woolwich Arsenal	16 January 1909
Replay	Woolwich Arsenal	2–0	Croydon Common	20 January 1909

== Second round proper ==
The sixteen second round matches were played on Saturday, 6 February 1909. Six matches were drawn, with the replays taking place in the following midweek fixture.

Tie no	Home team	Score	Away team	Date
1	Bristol City	2–2	Bury	6 February 1909
Replay	Bury	0–1	Bristol City	10 February 1909
2	Liverpool	2–3	Norwich City	6 February 1909
3	Preston North End	1–2	Sunderland	6 February 1909
4	Nottingham Forest	1–0	Brentford	6 February 1909
5	Blackburn Rovers	2–1	Chelsea	6 February 1909
6	West Bromwich Albion	1–2	Bradford City	6 February 1909
7	Leicester Fosse	0–2	Derby County	6 February 1909
8	Woolwich Arsenal	1–1	Millwall Athletic	6 February 1909
Replay	Millwall Athletic	1–0	Woolwich Arsenal	10 February 1909
9	Stockport County	1–1	Glossop	6 February 1909
Replay	Glossop	1–0	Stockport County	9 February 1909
10	Newcastle United	2–1	Blackpool	6 February 1909
11	Tottenham Hotspur	1–0	Fulham	6 February 1909
12	Portsmouth	2–2	The Wednesday	6 February 1909
Replay	The Wednesday	3–0	Portsmouth	11 February 1909
13	Manchester United	1–0	Everton	6 February 1909
14	Plymouth Argyle	2–0	Exeter City	6 February 1909
15	Leeds City	1–1	West Ham United	6 February 1909
Replay	West Ham United	2–1	Leeds City	11 February 1909
16	Crystal Palace	0–0	Burnley	6 February 1909
Replay	Burnley	9–0	Crystal Palace	10 February 1909

== Third round proper ==
The eight third-round matches were scheduled for Saturday, 20 February 1909. There were two replays, played in the following midweek fixture.

Tie no	Home team	Score	Away team	Date
1	Bristol City	2–0	Norwich City	20 February 1909
2	Nottingham Forest	3–1	Millwall Athletic	20 February 1909
3	The Wednesday	0–1	Glossop	20 February 1909
4	Derby County	1–0	Plymouth Argyle	20 February 1909
5	Tottenham Hotspur	0–0	Burnley	20 February 1909
Replay	Burnley	3–1	Tottenham Hotspur	24 February 1909
6	West Ham United	0–0	Newcastle United	20 February 1909
Replay	Newcastle United	2–1	West Ham United	24 February 1909
7	Manchester United	6–1	Blackburn Rovers	20 February 1909
8	Bradford City	0–1	Sunderland	20 February 1909

== Fourth round proper ==
The four quarter final matches were scheduled for Saturday, 6 March 1909, although only two games were played on this date. The Burnley–Manchester United (the game was played 5 March and was abandoned for bad weather conditions after 72 minutes at 1-0 for Burnley) and Derby County–Nottingham Forest ties were played instead four and seven days later, respectively. The other two games were drawn, and replayed on 10 March.

Tie no	Home team	Score	Away team	Date
1	Burnley	abandoned	Manchester United	5 March 1909
Replay	Burnley	2–3	Manchester United	10 March 1909
2	Derby County	3–0	Nottingham Forest	13 March 1909
3	Newcastle United	2–2	Sunderland	6 March 1909
Replay	Sunderland	0–3	Newcastle United	10 March 1909
4	Glossop	0–0	Bristol City	6 March 1909
Replay	Bristol City	1–0	Glossop	10 March 1909

== Semifinals ==
The semi-final matches were played on Saturday, 27 March 1909. Bristol City and Derby County drew their match, and went on to replay it four days later. Bristol City won this tie, and so went on to meet the other semi-final winner, Manchester United, in the final.

27 March 1909
15:00

Manchester United	1–0	Newcastle United

Bramall Lane, Sheffield

27 March 1909
15:00

Bristol City	1–1	Derby County

Stamford Bridge, London

Replay

31 March 1909
15:00

Bristol City	2–1	Derby County

St Andrew's, Birmingham

== Final ==
The final was played on 24 April 1909 at Crystal Palace, and was contested by Manchester United and Bristol City, both of the First Division. Manchester United won by a single goal, scored by Sandy Turnbull midway through the first half. This was the first of United's twelve FA Cup titles to date.

=== Match details ===
24 April 1909
15:30 UTC+0

Bristol City	0–1	Manchester United
	Report	S. Turnbull 22'

Crystal Palace, London
Attendance: 71,401
Referee: J. Mason (Staffordshire)

Bristol City	Manchester United

== See also ==
- FA Cup final results 1872-
