= Billy Tuft =

English footballer

Personal information
- Full name: William Tuft
- Date of birth: 1874
- Place of birth: Wolverhampton, England
- Position: Full back

Senior career*
Years	Team	Apps	(Gls)
- Coseley United
1896–1900	Wolverhampton Wanderers	0	(0)
1900–1901	Walsall	33	(0)
1901–1907	Bristol City	137	(0)
Total		170	(0)
- * Club domestic league appearances and goals

Willam Tuft (1874 – after 1906) was an English professional association football player in the years prior to the First World War. He made 170 appearances in the Football League.

== Career ==
Born in Wolverhampton, he began his career with junior-level club Coseley United before joining hometown club Wolverhampton Wanderers in July 1896. In July 1900 he moved to Walsall, where he spent a single season before Sam Hollis signed him in July 1901 to play for Bristol City. Walsall finished 16th of 18 clubs in the Second Division in 1900-01 but were not re-elected at the end of the season being replaced by newly elected Bristol City; Walsall had spells in the Midland League & Birmingham League before they regained League status in 1921–22. He made 137 League appearances for the "Robins" operating at both right and left back. He was ever present 34 appearances in season 1901-02 when City finished 6th out of 18 teams in the Second Division. He missed 4 games in the next three seasons as City finished 4th each season in the Second Division making 33 appearances in 1902–03 at RB, 32 appearances in 1903–04 at left back and 33 appearances in 1904-05 mainly at left back. After 5 appearances at left back he was replaced by Joe Cottle in the Second Division title winning 1905–06 season. Tuft had a benefit match on 25 Feb 1907 Bristol City v Southampton raising £140 before retiring in the summer and returning to Bilston.

Note that a player named Walter Eli Tuft played 8 league games for Wolverhampton Wanderers at both right back & left back in the First Division making 1 appearance in 1897–98, 4 appearances in 1898-99 and 3 appearances in 1899–1900. Wally Tuft then joined Darlaston and was signed by Bristol City in 1900 but never played a game for the Robins. There is no trace of a Walter Eli Tuft in the 1881 census but William Tuft born 1874 was living with his family at Lichfield Row, Wolverhampton.
