= Cumberland Senior Cup =

- Founded: 1886
- Region: Cumberland
- Teams: 28 (2025-2026)
- Current champions: Carlisle City (6th title)
- Most championships: Carlisle United (26 titles)
- Website: cumberlandfa.com

The Fred Conway Cumberland Cup is the current senior county cup in the ancient county of Cumberland. It is administered by the Cumberland Football Association (CFA). According to the current rules of the competition, it is open to all clubs whose first affiliation is with the CFA.

Currently Carlisle United are the only fulltime professional team in the competition since Workington left the football league in 1977, so as a result they now tend to enter their reserve team. Other teams that enter are Workington, Cleator Moor Celtic, Penrith, Carlisle City, Whitehaven, and Windscale are from different levels of non-league. Northern Premier League , North West Counties Football League, Northern Football League , West Lancashire Football League and Wearside Football League are represented by these teams.

Teams from the Cumberland County League and the Westmorland League can also take part as they are covered by the Cumberland Football Association.

In previous years Scottish teams such as Annan Athletic, Gretna and Hearts of Liddesdale have also entered the competition due to being in the Carlisle and District League at the time. In Annan and Gretna's case they have even won the competition several times.

The current holders are Carlisle City who defeated Kirkoswald 3–0 in the 2025–2026 final at Frenchfield Park Stadium, Penrith.

== Winners ==
The last win for a club is shown in bold.

Season	Winners	Runners up
1885–86	Carlisle A.F.C.	Workington (Original)
1886–87	Workington (Original)	Carlisle A.F.C.
1887–88	Workington (Original)	Keswick
1888–89	Workington (Original)	Distington
1889–90	Workington (Original)	Carlisle A.F.C.
1890–91	Workington (Original)	Frizington Rovers
1891–92	Moss Bay Exchange	Workington (Original)
1892–93	Moss Bay Exchange	Keswick
1893–94	Carlisle A.F.C.	Moss Bay Exchange
1894–95	Black Diamonds	Carlisle A.F.C.
1895–96	Workington (Original)	Carlisle A.F.C.
1896–97	Workington (Original)	Carlisle A.F.C.
1897–98	Workington (Original)	Moss Bay Exchange
1898–99	Workington (Original)	Frizington White Star
1899–1900	Black Diamonds	Workington (Original)
1900–01	Shaddongate United	Workington (Original)
1901–02	Frizington White Star	Keswick
1902–03	Shaddongate United	Workington (Original)
1903–04	Cleator Moor United	Keswick
1904–05	Carlisle United	Carlisle Red Rose
1905–06	Carlisle Red Rose	Frizington White Star
1906–07	Workington (Original)	Carlisle United
1907–08	Workington (Original)	Wigton Harriers
1908–09	Carlisle United	Workington (Original)
1909–10	Workington (Original)	Carlisle United
1910–11	Carlisle United	Lowca Juniors
1911–12	Moor Row Villa Rovers	Workington Central
1912–13	Carlisle United	Frizington Athletic
1913–14	Egremont Town	Carlisle United
1914–15	Bigrigg	Carlisle United
1918–19	Cleator Moor Celtic	Carlisle Tyers
1919–20	Frizington Athletic	West Seaton Rangers
1920–21	Cleator Moor Celtic	Maryport
1921–22	Carlisle United	Cleator Moor Celtic
1922–23	Whitehaven Recreation	Penrith
1923–24	Carlisle United	Workington
1924–25	Workington	Cleator Moor Celtic
1925–26	Frizington Harriers	Glasgow & South West Railway
1926–27	Whitehaven Athletic	Workington
1927–28	Carlisle United	Carrs Athletic
1928–29	Carlisle United	South Tyne Rangers
1929–30	Carlisle United	Workington
1930–31	Carlisle United	Kells
1931–32	Carlisle United	Whitehaven Athletic
1932–33	Carlisle United	Maryport
1933–34	Carlisle United	West Seaton Rangers
1934–35	Workington	Carlisle United
1935–36	Wellington Villa	Kells
1936–37	Workington	Carlisle United
1937–38	Workington	Carlisle United
1938–39	Carlisle United	Border Star
1939–40	Carlisle United	Cockermouth
1940–41	Lowca	Border Regiment
1941–42	Wanderers	Lowca
1942–43	Kells	Boscombe Exiles
1943–44	Wanderers	Kells
1944–45	Kells	Wanderers
1945–46	Wanderers	Cleator Moor Celtic
1946–47	Penrith	Workington
1947–48	Penrith	Parton United
1948–49	Parton United	Holme Head
1949–50	Workington	Parton United
1950–51	Penrith	Keekle
1951–52	67th Training Regiment	Parton United
1952–53	Annan Athletic	Gretna
1953–54	Workington	Holme Head
1954–55	Cleator Moor Celtic	Annan Athletic
1955–56	Royal Army Ordnance Corps	Salterbeck
1956–57	Salterbeck	Gretna
1957–58	Penrith	Lowca
1958–59	Gretna	Aspatria
1959–60	Gretna	Lowca
1960–61	Penrith	Gretna
1961–62	Penrith	Braithwaite
1962–63	Penrith	Coronation Boys Club
1963–64	Penrith	Coronation Boys Club
1964–65	Penrith	Windscale Rovers
1965–66	Penrith	Windscale Rovers
1966–67	Gretna	Penrith
1967–68	Workington	Gretna
1968–69	Annan Athletic	Workington
1969–70	Marsh Boys Club	Windscale United
1970–71	Penrith	Marsh Boys Club
1971–72	Annan Athletic	Penrith
1972–73	Penrith	Haig Colliery
1973–74	Alston	Penrith
1974–75	Penrith	Gretna
1975–76	Carlisle City	Hearts of Liddesdale
1976–77	Carlisle City	Wigton
1977–78	Haig Colliery	Gretna
1978–79	Cleator Moor Celtic	Workington
1979–80	Carlisle United	Penrith
1980–81	Wigton	Netherhall
1981–82	Haig Colliery	Penrith
1982–83	Gretna	Cleator United
1983–84	Gretna	Windscale United
1984–85	Haig Colliery	Carlisle United
1985–86	Workington	Gretna
1986–87	Cleator Moor Celtic	Cumbria Police
1987–88	Gretna	Wetheriggs
1988–89	Gretna	Cleator Moor Celtic
1989–90	Carlisle United	Marchon
1990–91	Marchon	Cleator Moor Celtic
1991–92	Gretna	Penrith
1992–93	Carlisle United	Gretna
1993–94	Gretna	Carlisle United
1994–95	Gretna	Penrith
1995–96	Workington	Cleator Moor Celtic
1996–97	Gretna	Gillford Park
1997–98	Windscale	Carlisle City
1998–99	Cleator Moor Celtic	Carlisle City
1999–2000	Workington	Carlisle United
2000–01	Penrith	Northbank
2001–02	Carlisle United	Carlisle City
2002–03	Northbank	Carlisle United
2003–04	Carlisle City	Penrith
2004–05	Carlisle United	Aspatria
2005–06	Penrith	Carlisle City
2006–07	Workington	Carlisle United
2007–08	Carlisle United	Penrith
2008–09	Workington	Penrith
2009–10	Penrith	Gillford Park
2010–11	Carlisle United	Netherhall
2011–12	Carlisle United	Harraby Catholic Club
2012–13	Carlisle United	Whitehaven
2013–14	Celtic Nation	Aspatria
2014–15	Carlisle United	Netherhall
2015–16	Workington	Aspatria
2016–17	Workington	Penrith
2017–18	Cleator Moor Celtic	Penrith
2018–19	Carlisle United	Penrith
2021–22	Carlisle City	Wetheriggs United
2022–23	Workington	Penrith
2023–24	Workington	Carlisle United
2024–25	Carlisle City	Penrith
2025–26	Carlisle City	Kirkoswald F.C.

The competition was not held between 1915 and 1918 due to World War I.

The competition was cancelled in 2019–20 and 2020–21 due to the COVID-19 pandemic.

=== Most wins ===
Team	Wins
**Carlisle United**	26
Penrith	18
Workington AFC	16
Workington (Original)	12
Gretna	10
Cleator Moor Celtic	7
Carlisle City	6
Annan Athletic	3
Haig Colliery	3
Wanderers	3

=== Recent finals ===
9 May 2006

Carlisle City	0 – 1	Workington

Borough Park, Workington

8 May 2007

Carlisle United	1 – 2	Workington

Brunton Park, Carlisle

16 April 2008

Carlisle United	2 – 0	Penrith

Brunton Park, Carlisle

22 April 2009

Workington	2 – 0	Penrith

Brunton Park, Carlisle

7 May 2010

Gillford Park	0 – 6	Penrith

Brunton Park, Carlisle

27 April 2011

Netherall	0 – 2	Carlisle United
		Loy 58' (pen.); Madden 78'

Brunton Park, Carlisle

1 May 2012
19:00 BST

Carlisle United	2 – 1	Harraby Catholic Club
Potts 35'; Beck 89'		Armstrong 39'

Brunton Park, Carlisle
Referee: John Mulligan

23 April 2013

Carlisle United	8 – 1	Whitehaven

Brunton Park, Carlisle
Referee: Anthony Backhouse

29 April 2014

Aspatria	0 – 3	Celtic Nation
		McShane 4'; McShane 45'; Rae 53'

Brunton Park, Carlisle

28 April 2015

Carlisle United	3 – 1	Netherhall
Kearns 4'; Beck 19', 26'		Anderson 22'

Brunton Park, Carlisle
Attendance: 336

3 May 2016
19:00 BST

Aspatria	1 – 4	Workington
Graham 60'		Tinnion 70'; Allison 82'

Brunton Park, Carlisle
Attendance: 517
Referee: John Mulligan

3 May 2017
19:00 BST

Penrith	1 – 2 (a.e.t.)	Workington
Coleman 44'		Allison 78'; Symington 118'

Brunton Park, Carlisle
Attendance: 622
Referee: Adam Pattinson

8 May 2018
19:00 BST

Cleator Moor Celtic	2 – 1 (a.e.t.)	Penrith
Hall 28'; Birdsall 96'		Shields 77'

Brunton Park, Carlisle
Attendance: 604
Referee: Kevin Mulraine

30 Apr 2019
19:00 BST

Penrith	1 – 3	Carlisle United
Gardner 55'		Johnson 21' (o.g.); Bowman 45+2' (o.g.); Birch (90_4)

Brunton Park, Carlisle
Attendance: 618
Referee: Scott Taylor

26 April 2022
19:00 BST

Carlisle City	4-0	Wetheriggs United
Atkinson 1'; Atkinson 30'; Holt 46'; Grandison 90+4'

Frenchfield Park, Penrith
Attendance: 530
Referee: Scott Henry

2 May 2023
19:00 BST

Workington	9-1	Penrith
Mugalula 2'; Mugalula 8'; Hughes 18'; Mugalula 44'; Reilly 45'; Mugalula 50'; Hughes 54'; Moore 80'; Hughes 85'		Hunter 21'

Brunton Park, Carlisle
Attendance: 676
Referee: John Mulligan

23 April 2024
19:00 BST

Workington	1-0	Carlisle United
Allison 60'

Borough Park, Workington
Attendance: 1,148
Referee: Scott Henry

22 April 2025
19:00 BST

Penrith	0-1	Carlisle City
	Report	Irving 68'

Brunton Park, Carlisle
Attendance: 757

21 April 2026
19:30 BST

Kirkoswald	0-3	Carlisle City
	Report	Irving 42' Irving 62' Irving 85'

Frenchfield Park, Penrith
Attendance: 544
