= Cumberland Football Association =

Governing body of football in Cumberland, England

- Cumberland FA logo
- Formation: 1884
- Headquarters: Unit 3 & 4, Tithe House, Station Street
- Location: Cockermouth
- Chief executive officer: Ben Snowdon
- Website: www.cumberlandfa.com

The Cumberland Football Association, is the governing body of football in the ancient county of Cumberland, England and was founded in 1884. The Cumberland FA run a number of cups at different levels for teams all across North Cumbria. South Cumbria is covered by the Lancashire FA. The head office used to be based in Workington but in April 2018, they moved into a new office located in Cockermouth.

== Teams and Leagues covered by the Cumberland FA ==
- Carlisle United
- Workington
- Penrith
- Whitehaven
- Cleator Moor Celtic
- Carlisle City
- Whitehaven Miners
- Windscale
- Cumberland County League
- West Cumberland Sunday League
- West Cumberland Youth league
- Carlisle Sunday League
- Carlisle Glass Youth League
- Penrith Youth League

== County Cups winners ==
Competition	Holders
Cumberland Senior Cup	Cleator Moor Celtic
Cumberland Women's Cup	Carlisle United
Cumberland Sunday Cup	Brampton FC
Cumberland U18 Cup	Crown Newlaithes FC
