= Andy Burton (footballer) =

Scottish footballer

Personal information
- Full name: Andrew Dunsire Burton
- Date of birth: 1884
- Place of birth: Lochgelly, Scotland
- Date of death: 29 July 1962 (aged 77–78)
- Place of death: Edinburgh, Scotland
- Position: Inside left

Senior career*
Years	Team	Apps	(Gls)
- Thompson's Rovers
1903–1904	Lochgelly United		
1904–1905	Motherwell	25	(6)
1905–1911	Bristol City	192	(45)
1911–1912	Everton	12	(4)
1912–1914	Reading	68	(16)
1920–1922	East Fife	23	(2)
- * Club domestic league appearances and goals

Andrew Dunsire Burton (1884 – 29 July 1962) was a Scottish professional association football player in the years prior to the First World War. He made over 40 appearances in Scottish League, over 200 appearances in The Football League and played in the Southern League.

== Career ==
Born in Lochgelly in Scotland, Andy Burton featured prominently in Bristol City's successes in the first decade of the 20th century under Manager Harry Thickett. He played for local clubs in Scotland, including Thompson's Rovers & Lochgelly United, before joining Motherwell, scoring 6 goals in 25 appearances for the Scottish First Division team.

Thickett signed Burton in July 1905 for Bristol City in the Second Division. He made his league debut in the 1–5 defeat at Manchester United on 2 September 1905, immediately proceeding Bristol City's record run of 14 successive league wins. Burton made 37 appearances at inside left scoring eight goals, replacing Arthur Capes, who moved to Swindon Town in the summer, in 1905–06 for the "Robins" when Bristol City finished as Second Division champions.

In the next season in the First Division, Burton contributed 13 goals from 34 appearances as the regular inside left, missing only the final four league games in 1906–07 as City finished as First Division runners up to Newcastle United. Burton scored twice in each of three successive home games during December 1906. Burton made a further 32 appearances scoring nine goals in 1907–08 as the regular inside left. In the three seasons 1905–1908, Burton formed a part of a great trio of City goalscoring forwards, Billy Maxwell at inside right scored 55 goals, centre forward Sammy Gilligan netted 51 goals and Burton contributed 30 goals of the 207 league goals scored in this period. Maxwell and Gilligan gradually moved on, but Burton continued as inside left in his next two seasons, both spent in the First Division.

In 1908–09, Burton made 35 appearances, scoring eight goals, and played in all of the ten FA Cup ties appearing at inside left in the 1909 FA Cup final, losing 0–1 to Manchester United at the Crystal Palace, Bristol City's only final appearance to date. He made 33 appearances scoring three goals in 1909–10 and shared inside left with Alec Logan with 21 appearances scoring four goals in 1910–11, the season when Bristol City were relegated back to the Second Division, before leaving City in July 1911 to join First Division Everton.

On the opening day of the season, Burton scored once in a 2–2 draw against Tottenham Hotspur. However, he failed to establish himself in the Everton team, and, after 12 appearances and four goals, moved to Southern League Reading. At Reading, in the First Division of the Southern League, Burton made 32 appearances, scoring 11 goals in 1912–13 as Reading finished eighth of 20 clubs. The following season Burton made 36 appearances, scoring five goals as Reading rose to fourth place in the table. Burton next appeared for East Fife in 1921–22 in the Scottish Second Division making 23 appearances scoring two goals. Andy Burton later coached in Belgium.

== Honours ==
=== With Bristol City ===
- Football League Second Division champion: 1905–06
- Football League First Division runner-up: 1906–07
- FA Cup runner-up: 1909
