= Carlisle A.F.C. =

Defunct association football club from Carlisle, England

- Full name: Carlisle Association Football Club
- Nickname: the City Club
- Founded: 1880
- Dissolved: 1899
- Ground: Borough Grounds (1890–98)
- President: W. C. Gully MP
Home colours

Carlisle Association Football Club was an association football club from the city of Carlisle, Cumberland, England, active in the 19th century. Although referred to as "the City club" at times, its formal name was simply Carlisle, although the club began to be referred to as Carlisle City from the mid-1890s as more clubs started up in Carlisle.

== History ==
Mock funeral notice issued by Mossbay Exchange supporters after beating Carlisle AFC in the Cumberland Senior Cup, North Cumberland Reformer, 5 February 1891

The club was formed on 9 September 1880, at a meeting held in the Magnet Coffee Rooms. It won the first Cumberland Association Cup in 1885–86, coming from behind to beat Workington 2–1 in the final at Highmoor Park in Wigton, both goals scored by T. White; Workington had been the favourite, given that its side was composed of "men who had learnt the game in Sheffield". Workington protested the first goal, on the basis that the referee awarded the goal before the umpires had asked for a decision, but by the time the protest was heard by the Cumberland Association, the protest had morphed into a goal wrongly disallowed; the protest was upheld but the consequential muddle lasted into the following season before Carlisle was eventually declared champion. Workington's revenge came in beating Carlisle 8–0 in the final, held at the Workington rugby ground, the following season.

Carlisle was also runner-up in the competition in 1889–90. The latter season was otherwise so successful - including beating their Cup conquerors Workington twice, and recording 26 wins in 37 matches, another victim being Hamilton Academical - that it invited any Glaswegian sides touring England to stop off en route for a friendly. The club also entered the FA Cup for the only time the following season, the gulf in class between Cumberland and the rest of the country being shown by Carlisle losing its first qualifying round tie 6–1 at home to Football Alliance member Bootle, the visitors scoring after three minutes, and easing off in the second half after turning around 5–0 up.

Despite this successful campaign, the club nearly collapsed during the 1890–91 season, its defeat to Mossbay Exchange in the Cumberland Senior Cup in January 1891 being so devastating that, despite having 14 matches remaining in its calendar, the club did not play a single one of those matches. Even the club's annual general meeting had to be adjourned as, with only five members turning up, the committee was not quorate; the only matter considered was the club's £60 debt.

In 1894, the club merged with Eden Wanderers, keeping the Carlisle name but adopting the Wanderers colours. The move immediately bore dividends as Carlisle won the Association Cup for the second and final time three months later, again coming from behind to win 2–1, this time against Mossbay Exchange; Bullman headed the winner from a free-kick in the very last minute.

=== Violence ===
Carlisle hosted the final of the 1896–97 Senior Cup, the club's fourth consecutive appearance in the final, and its third consecutive defeat, the club being beaten by Workington. As the trophy was being presented, some of the home supporters threw stones at the Workington side, one of which struck the 19 year old John Robert Fisher on the left temple. Fisher suffered a haemorrhage later that night and was bedridden as a consequence. On 20 November, Fisher died of his injuries. A verdict of manslaughter was returned. The association resolved not to hold any finals in Carlisle for a year. The club never reached the final again and, indeed, only lasted two more seasons; it disbanded at the end of the 1898–99 season, with the newly-formed Midland Loco side taking over its ground. Four of the Carlisle players joined Annan.

== Colours ==
The club wore white jerseys; this may have been an all white outfit, as, on the merger with Eden Wanderers, the club adopted the latter's colours, which were also white jerseys, but with navy knickers and red stockings. The club's change shirt was the County FA colour of blue.

== Ground ==
The club's first ground was the Denton Holme Recreation Ground, on Cemetery Lane, which the club formally enclosed in 1885. In 1890 the club moved to the Borough Running Grounds on Warwick Road. In 1898, with the Borough Grounds requisitioned for housing, it left for Melbourne Park, off Greystone Road, its final ground.

== Honours ==
- Cumberland Senior Cup
  - Winner: 1885–86, 1893–94
  - Runner-up: 1886–87, 1889–90, 1894–95, 1895–96, 1896–97
