= Walter Tranter =

English footballer

Personal information
- Full name: Walter Rogers Tranter
- Date of birth: 22 August 1874
- Place of birth: Stockton-on-Tees, England
- Date of death: 14 July 1945 (aged 70)
- Place of death: Romford, Essex, England
- Position: Left-back

Senior career*
| Years | Team | Apps | (Gls) |
| 1897–1899 | Thames Ironworks | 21 | (0) |
| 1899–1900 | Chatham | | |
| 1900 | West Ham United | 4 | (0) |
| 1901–? | Distillery | | |
- * Club domestic league appearances and goals

Walter Rogers Tranter (22 August 1874 – 14 July 1945) was an English footballer who played as a left-back.

Born in Stockton-on-Tees, Tranter played as a left-back for Thames Ironworks, the team that would later become West Ham United. The club handbook described him as a player that "rushes in where others feared to tread". He was a part of the team that won the London League during the 1897-98 season, and captained the side to the Southern League Second Division championship in 1898–99. He then left to play for Chatham, but returned to the newly renamed club, along with teammate Albert Kaye, for the 1900–01 season. He played in the inaugural game for the new club, a 7–0 battering of Gravesend on 1 September 1900, and made a further three Southern League appearances for West Ham that season. His last two games for the club were in the FA Cup Qualifying Round 4 against New Brompton, which went to a replay on 21 November 1900.

In June 1901, he and Kaye joined Belfast club Distillery.

== Personal life ==
Walter Tranter's father was Isaac Rogers Tranter, who was the Captain of the Fire Brigade Company in Thornaby-on-Tees. Walter married three times, having several children with his first two wives, both of whom predeceased him. One of his grandchildren is former Leeds United left-winger Michael O'Grady. One of his great-grandchildren is Commonwealth Games Bronze medallist in swimming, Alyson Jones.

At the time of the 1911 census, Walter lived with his second wife Phoebe in Thornaby-on-Tees and worked in the shipyard as a "plater". The household included two children from his first marriage to Hannah and three more from his second. Phoebe died in 1914 and Walter married Isabel Rowell in 1917. There were no more children. At some point they moved to Romford, Essex, Walter dying there in 1945, followed by Isabel in 1959.
