= Fergus Hunt =

English footballer

Personal information
- Date of birth: 1876
- Place of birth: Masbrough, West Riding of Yorkshire, England
- Date of death: 1953 (aged 76–77)
- Position: Forward

Senior career*
| Years | Team | Apps | (Gls) |
- Mexborough
| 1893–1894 | Middlesbrough Ironopolis | | |
| 1895–1897 | Darwen | 57 | (27) |
| 1897–1900 | Woolwich Arsenal | 69 | (28) |
| 1900–1902 | West Ham United | 42 | (9) |
| 1902 | Woolwich Arsenal | 3 | (1) |
| 1903–1905 | Fulham | 21 | (3) |
- Burton United
- Shildon
- * Club domestic league appearances and goals

Fergus Hunt (born 1876) was an English footballer, who played as a striker or right-winger.

== Club career ==
After beginning his career with Mexborough and Middlesbrough Ironopolis, Hunt joined Darwen after taking a season out of football.

Hunt joined Woolwich Arsenal in May 1897, becoming a key player for the club after scoring 30 goals in all competitions in his first two seasons at the club, holding the accolade of the club's top scorer in his first two seasons at the club.

In 1900, Hunt joined West Ham United as Arnold Hills began to assemble his new club, a continuation of Thames Ironworks, and no fewer than six players were bought into the club alongside him. On 1 September 1900, Hunt scored on his debut against Gravesend United in a 7–0 victory.

Following a spell with Shildon, Hunt retired from football in 1907.

== Personal life ==
Hunt's birth year is disputed, with multiple sources giving his birth year as 1874, 1875 or 1876.
