= Bob Young (footballer, born 1886) =

Scottish footballer

Personal information
- Full name: Robert K. Young
- Date of birth: 1886
- Place of birth: Guardbridge, Scotland
- Position: Right back

Youth career
- Vale of Eden

Senior career*
Years	Team	Apps	(Gls)
–1907	Dundee Violet		
1907–1920	Bristol City	168	(0)

International career
1907	Scotland Juniors	2	(0)
- * Club domestic league appearances and goals

Robert K. Young (born 1886) was a Scottish professional footballer who made over 160 Football League appearances for Bristol City before and after the First World War as a right back.
