= George Ratcliffe (footballer) =

English footballer

Personal information
- Full name: George Albert Ratcliffe
- Date of birth: 7 December 1876
- Place of birth: Longton, England
- Date of death: 4 June 1944 (aged 67)
- Place of death: Ashton-under-Lyne, Lancashire, England
- Position: Left winger

Senior career*
Years	Team	Apps	(Gls)
- Crewe Alexandra
?–1900	Grimsby Town		
1900–1902	West Ham United	41	(14)
1902–?	Doncaster Rovers		
- * Club domestic league appearances and goals

George Albert Ratcliffe (7 December 1876 – 4 June 1944) was an English footballer.

== Club career ==
Ratcliffe played his early football in the North Staffordshire League. His football skills resulted in him being signed by Crewe Alexandra. Later he had spells at Sheffield United and Grimsby Town.

In 1900, Arnold Hills decided to bring in some experienced players to his new West Ham side. He played in 17 games in his first season, bagging 4 goals. Three of those coming in the last two matches of the season. The 1901-02 season was a big improvement and he ended up as joint top scorer with Billy Grassam, scoring 10 times in 24 games. At the end of the season Ratcliffe was transferred to Doncaster Rovers.
