= Bill Demmery =

English footballer

Personal information
- Full name: William Demmery
- Date of birth: 9 March 1877
- Place of birth: Kingswood, South Gloucestershire, England
- Date of death: 1955 (aged 77–78)
- Position: Goalkeeper

Senior career*
Years	Team	Apps	(Gls)
1894–1897	Warmley		
1897–1898	Staple Hill		
1898–1899	Warmley		
1899–1905	Bristol East		
1905–1908	Bristol City	38	(0)
1908–1910	Bristol Rovers		
1910–1911	Douglas		
1911	Treharris		
1912	Aberdare Town		
1913	Mid Rhondda		
1913	Treharris		
1914	Mid Rhondda		
1919	Douglas		
Total		38	(0)
- * Club domestic league appearances and goals

William Demmery (9 March 1877 – 1955) was an English footballer who played in the Football League for Bristol City.
