= Peter Chambers (footballer) =

English footballer

Personal information
- Date of birth: 1878
- Place of birth: Workington, England
- Date of death: 1952 (aged 73–74)
- Place of death: Swindon, England
- Position: Left half

Senior career*
Years	Team	Apps	(Gls)
- Black Diamonds
1897–1899	Blackburn Rovers	33	(0)
1899–1900	Bedminster	21	(0)
1900–1906	Bristol City	161	(10)
1906–1912	Swindon Town	89	(1)
Total		304	(11)
- * Club domestic league appearances and goals

Peter Chambers (1878–1952) was an English professional footballer in the years prior to the First World War. He made over 160 appearances in the Football League for Blackburn Rovers and Bristol City. He also played in the Southern League for both Bristol City and Swindon Town.

== Career ==
Chambers was born in Workington in 1878 where he helped the local club Black Diamonds to win both the Cumberland League and Cup. After playing for Blackburn Rovers, Bedminster and Bristol City, he joined Swindon Town in July 1907 along with Freddie Fenton and Billy Jones.

After retiring Chambers was landlord of the Red Lion pub and died in Swindon in 1952.
