= Workington A.F.C. (1883) =

Association football club in Workington, England

Workington
- Full name: Workington Association Football Club
- Founded: 1883
- Dissolved: 1911
- Ground: Cricket Field
Home colours

Workington Association Football Club was an association football club from Workington, Cumberland, which played in the FA Cup a number of times before the First World War.

== History ==
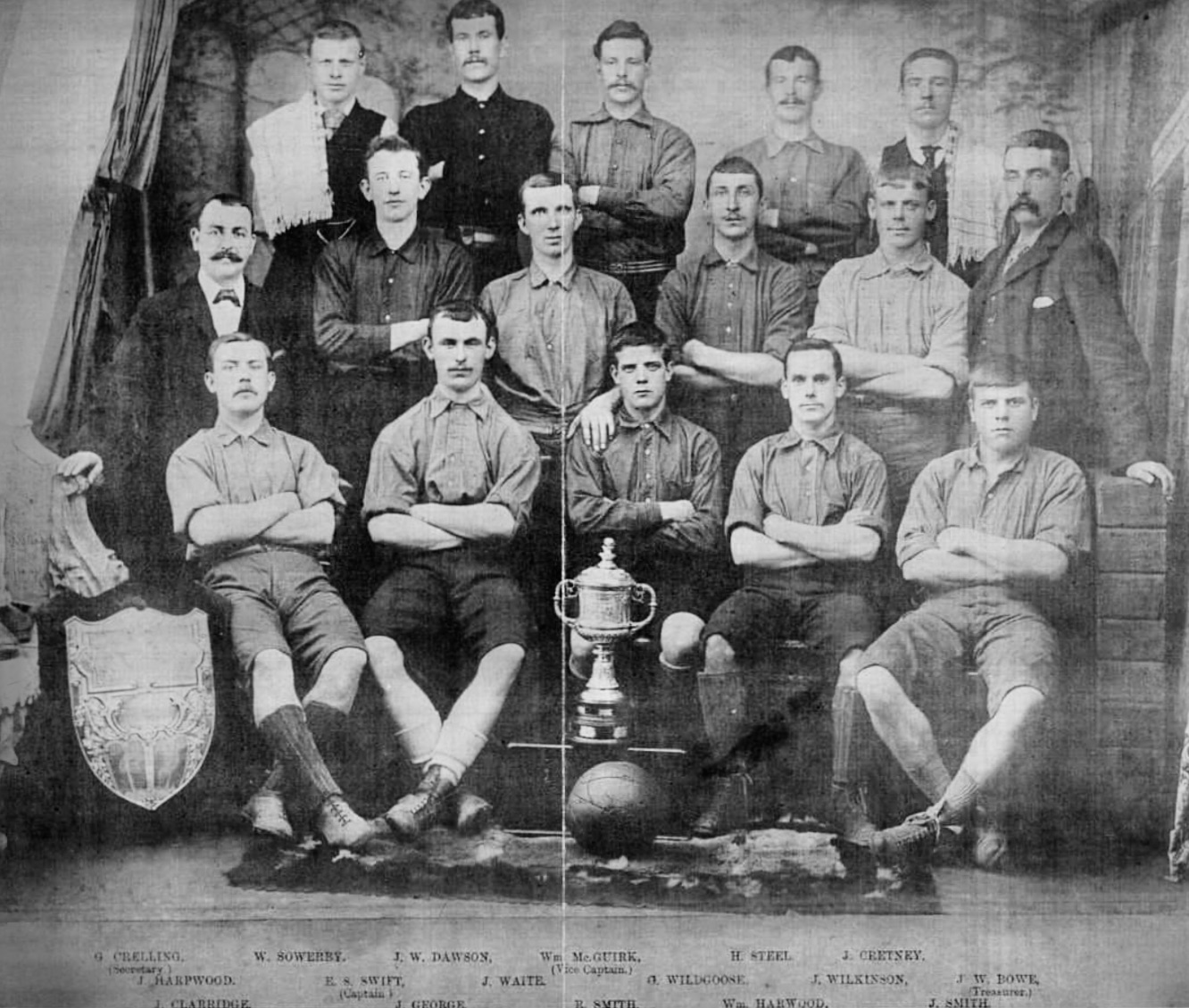
Workington Association Football Club, 1897–98, with the Cumberland Senior Cup and League shield

The club was founded in 1883, due to the arrival of steelworkers from Dronfield in Derbyshire in 1882; the club was even known as Workington (Dronfield) for a time.

It entered the FA Cup for the first time in the 1887–88 season. Its first round tie at Bootle ended in a 6–0 defeat, although it took 35 minutes before Bootle scored its first goal.

Workington was dominant in local football, reaching the final of the first Cumberland Senior Cup in 1885–86, and winning the competition for the first time by beating Carlisle A.F.C. 8–0 the following season; the club won the competition nine times before the end of the century, and 12 times overall. On a national scale, the club struggled in the qualifying rounds of the FA Cup, but in 1901–02 it joined the Lancashire League, recording two mid-table finishes until the League was folded into the Lancashire Combination. The club was promoted from the second division in 1906–07 and finished third overall in 1907–08, which was its best League position.

In 1908–09, Workington won through to the first round of the FA Cup for the first time, and only lost 2–0 at Football League First Division club Bradford City, at the second time of asking - the original tie was abandoned after an hour (with the game scoreless) due to a blizzard. Indeed Workington had a goal disallowed in the first half, and held the home side out until the 63rd minute. The following season, the club repeated the feat, and lost 2–1 at home to Manchester City - the club refused a £250 offer to switch the tie to Manchester and was rewarded with a crowd of 5,000.

However the cost of playing in the Lancashire Combination proved crippling, and in 1910–11 the club joined the North-Eastern League. The club only lasted one season - after its final match against Hartlepools United in April, the board of directors passed a resolution to wind up the club. Its debts were estimated to be £1,500 to £1,600 at the time.

=== Death of a player ===
On 27 March 1897, Workington beat Carlisle 4–2 away from home to win the Cumberland Cup. As the trophy was being presented, some of the home supporters threw stones at the Workington side, one of which struck the 19 year old John Robert Fisher on the left temple. Fisher suffered a haemorrhage later that night and was bedridden as a consequence. On 20 November, Fisher died of his injuries. A verdict of manslaughter was returned.

== Colours ==
The club's colours were originally red and white, but by the late 1890s were made up of scarlet jerseys. and dark knickers and stockings.

== Ground ==
The club played its home matches at the Workington Cricket Field in Schoose Close until 1909, other than two games it was forced to play at the Recreation Ground in Whitehaven in its last year there after hooliganism in a Lancashire League match against Manchester United reserves. Before the 1909–10 season the club moved to Lonsdale Park, which was the ground of the Workington rugby club.
