= Billy Wedlock =

English footballer (1880–1965)

- Wedlock, wearing his 1907 England cap

Personal information
- Full name: William John Wedlock
- Date of birth: 28 October 1880
- Place of birth: Bristol, England
- Date of death: 25 January 1965 (aged 84)
- Place of death: Bristol, England
- Height: 5 ft 5 in (1.65 m)
- Position: Centre half

Senior career*
Years	Team	Apps	(Gls)
1905–1921	Bristol City	403	(17)

International career
1907–1914	England	26	(2)
- * Club domestic league appearances and goals

William John Wedlock (28 October 1880 – 25 January 1965), also known as "Fatty" or the "India Rubber Man", was an English footballer who played for Bristol City in 1900–01 and from 1905 until his retirement in 1921. Between 1901 and 1905 he played for Aberdare. He was a centre-half whose short and stout stature belied his natural talent. He won 26 England caps between 1907 and 1914, his only rival for the centre-half position being Charlie Roberts of Manchester United, his opposite number in the 1909 FA Cup Final. The East End at Ashton Gate Stadium was named the Wedlock Stand in his honour, before being demolished in 2014 as part of the Ashton Gate Stadium redevelopment. Wedlock's pub (now demolished) opposite the ground was where he lived and worked for 43 years. Folk singer Fred Wedlock was Billy's grandson.

== Honours ==
Bristol City

- Football League Second Division: 1905–06
- Football League First Division runner-up: 1906–07
- FA Cup runner-up: 1909
