= Bob Hardy (footballer) =

English footballer

Personal information
- Full name: Robert Hardy
- Date of birth: 16 June 1885
- Place of birth: South Bank, England
- Date of death: 13 July 1960 (aged 75)
- Position: Winger

Senior career*
Years	Team	Apps	(Gls)
1906–1907	South Bank Celtic		
1907–1908	South Bank		
1908–1911	Bristol City	74	(13)
1911–1912	Wingate Albion		
1912–1913	Olympique (France)		
Total		74	(13)
- * Club domestic league appearances and goals

Robert Hardy (16 June 1885 – 13 July 1960) was an English footballer who played in the Football League for Bristol City. He played in the 1909 FA Cup Final where Bristol were beaten 1–0 by Manchester United. The shirt Hardy wore in the final was sold at auction for £13,000 in 2017.
