= Freddie Fenton =

English footballer

Personal information
- Full name: Frederick Fenton
- Date of birth: February 1879
- Place of birth: Gainsborough, England

Senior career*
Years	Team	Apps	(Gls)
- Gainsborough Trinity
1900–1901	West Ham United	14	(2)
- Swindon Town
- * Club domestic league appearances and goals

Frederick Fenton (born February 1879) was an English professional footballer who played for Gainsborough Trinity, West Ham United, and Swindon Town.
