= Harry Thickitt =

English footballer & manager

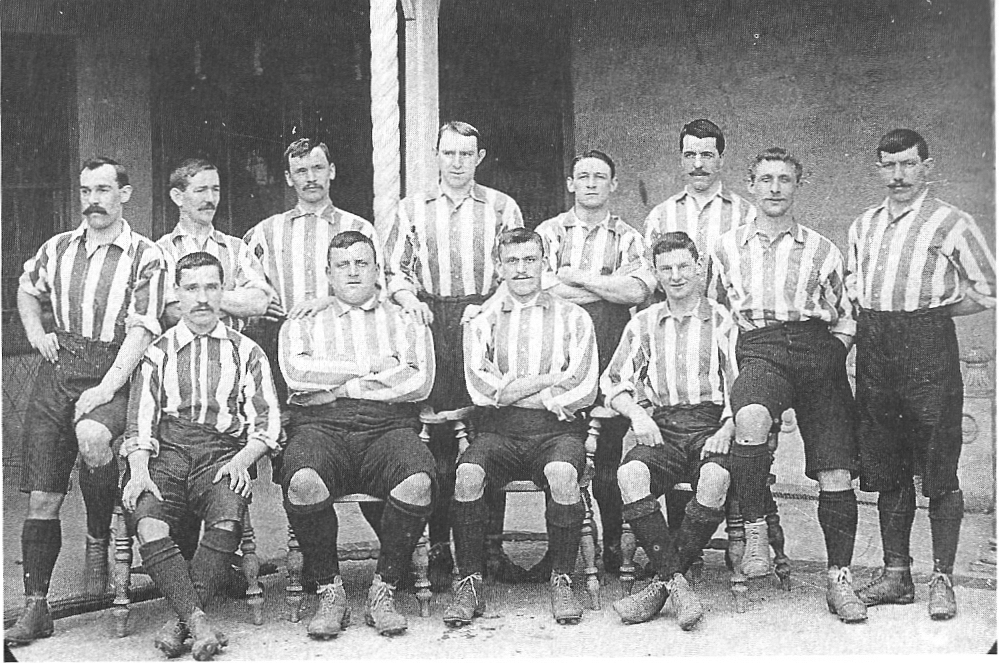
- Sheffield United team photo from 1901 – Thickitt is standing fourth from left

Personal information
- Full name: Henry Thickitt
- Date of birth: early 1872
- Place of birth: Hexthorpe, Doncaster, England
- Date of death: 15 November 1920 (aged 48)
- Place of death: Trowbridge, England
- Position: Right back

Youth career
- 1890–1891: Hexthorpe Wanderers

Senior career*
| Years | Team | Apps | (Gls) |
| 1891 | → Sheffield United (guest) | 1 | (0) |
| 1891 | Doncaster Rovers | 2 | (0) |
| 1891–1893 | Rotherham Town | 10 | (0) |
| 1893–1904 | Sheffield United | 259 | (0) |
| 1904–1905 | Bristol City | 14 | (0) |

International career
| 1899 | England | 2 | (0) |

Managerial career
- 1905–1910: Bristol City
Medal record
Sheffield United
| Runner-up | First Division | 1897 |
| Winner | First Division | 1898 |
| Winner | FA Cup | 1899 |
| Runner-up | First Division | 1900 |
| Runner-up | FA Cup | 1901 |
| Winner | FA Cup | 1902 |
Bristol City
| Winner | Second Division | 1906 |
| Runner-up | First Division | 1907 |
| Runner-up | FA Cup | 1909 |
- * Club domestic league appearances and goals

Henry Thickitt (or Thickett) (1872 – 15 November 1920) was a professional footballer and Manager. Born in Hexthorpe, Doncaster he played as a defender primarily for Sheffield United with whom he won the First Division once, the FA Cup twice and gained two caps for England. He then went on to achieve relative success as the manager of Bristol City.

== Playing career ==
=== Club career ===
Thickitt started his career as a youngster with Doncaster amateur side Hexthorpe Wanderers before being offered an extended trial as a guest player with Sheffield United in 1891 at the age of seventeen. United opted not to sign him after he appeared in five games that season. Following an injury to their captain Ramsey Grey on 21 March 1891, Thickitt was brought in by Doncaster Rovers for the remainder of that season in the Midland Alliance League. After this, he was offered professional terms at nearby Rotherham Town where he became a regular in the first team and appeared in The Football League.

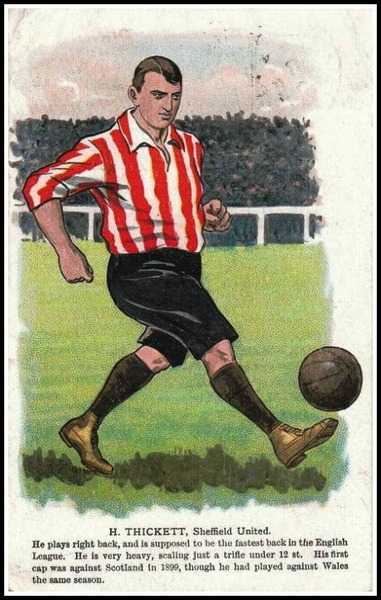
Cigarette card depicting Thickitt playing for Sheffield United.

By 1893 Sheffield United had become one of the top sides in the country but had not forgotten about Thickitt and signed him from Rotherham Town for £30 in November of that year, two seasons after his initial trial. Thickitt was immediately installed as first choice right back for the Bramall Lane club, a position he retained for almost ten years.

Although described at the time as a big, sturdy man he had a surprising turn of speed and this, in conjunction with his tackling and willingness to work hard endeared him to the fans and the club alike. Both he and United enjoyed a spectacularly successful spell during his time there, winning the First Division title in 1898 and finishing runners up on two more occasions, whilst he also gained two FA Cup winners medals in 1899 and 1902 with a runners-up medal sandwiched in between in 1901.

In his later years at the club he began to suffer from injuries but was renowned for playing when he shouldn't have, resulting in a story circulated at the time that he had played in the 1899 FA Cup final swathed in forty yards of bandages and fortified with copious amounts of whiskey! Although the Manchester doctor who had given the story to the press later admitted to have made it up Thickitt's reputation made it easy for supporters to believe. He was also a very moral man, offering to take a pay cut in 1895 because he believed he had missed too many first team games after contracting typhoid fever.

With his career seemingly coming to an end Thickitt eventually transferred to Bristol City in May 1904 where he played on for another season before being appointed manager in 1905.

=== International career ===
Thickitt was called up for England in 1899 and made two appearances in the Home Championship, against Wales on 20 March and Scotland on 8 April of that year.

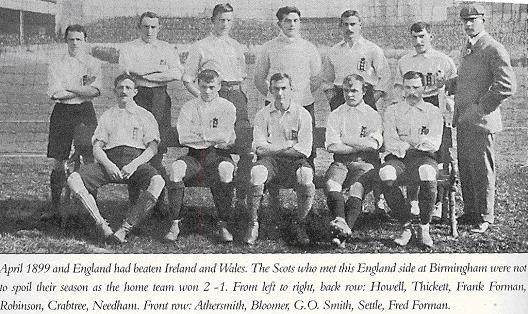
Thickitt in an England team photo of 1899.

== Managerial career ==
Thickitt played for Bristol City in the 1904–05 season when the club was managed by Sam Hollis. He took over as manager in March 1905 after Hollis departed and steered the club to English football's top flight at the first attempt. The most crucial decision he made was probably the re-signing of Billy Wedlock, who had left the club in 1901. In securing promotion from the English Second Division as champions in 1906, Bristol City won 14 league matches in a row (equalling a record set by Manchester United the previous year and only matched since by Preston North End and Arsenal).

Bristol City continued to progress under Thickitt's direction; the club ended the 1906–07 season as runners-up in the first division and Thickitt led them to their one and only FA Cup Final appearance against Manchester United in 1909 (a game won 1–0 by United.)

City then started to slide and Thickitt's tenure as manager came to an end following a 1–0 defeat away to Notts County in October 1910. Thickitt's last game in charge was halted temporarily by the appearance of an aeroplane which caused much excitement amongst the fans. Reverend J W Marsh, the referee, was so distracted by the appearance of the plane (flown by pioneer aviator Paul de Lesseps) that he held-up play for a while and then ended up recalling the players to the field of play (after he had blown the final whistle) because he had forgotten to add the four minutes or so lost because of the hold-up. Relegated at the end of the 1910–11 season, City didn't play top-flight football again until 1976.

== Honours ==
=== As a player ===
Sheffield United

- Football League Division One champions: 1897–98
  - Runners-up: 1896–97 and 1899–1900
- FA Cup winners: 1899, 1902
  - Finalists: 1901

=== As a manager ===
Bristol City

- Football League Division Two champions: 1905–06
- Football League Division One runners-up: 1906–07
- FA Cup finalists: 1909 FA Cup final

== Personal life ==
After leaving Bristol City 1910, Thickitt retired from football and became a licensee in Trowbridge until his death in 1920, aged 47.
