= Astley Bridge Wanderers F.C. =

Defunct association football club from Lancashire

- Full name: Astley Bridge Wanderers Football Club
- Nickname: the Bridgeites
- Founded: 1892
- Dissolved: 1900
- Ground: Astley Meadow
before 1894 colours	after 1894 colours

Astley Bridge Wanderers F.C. was an English association football club from Astley Bridge, near Bolton.

== History ==
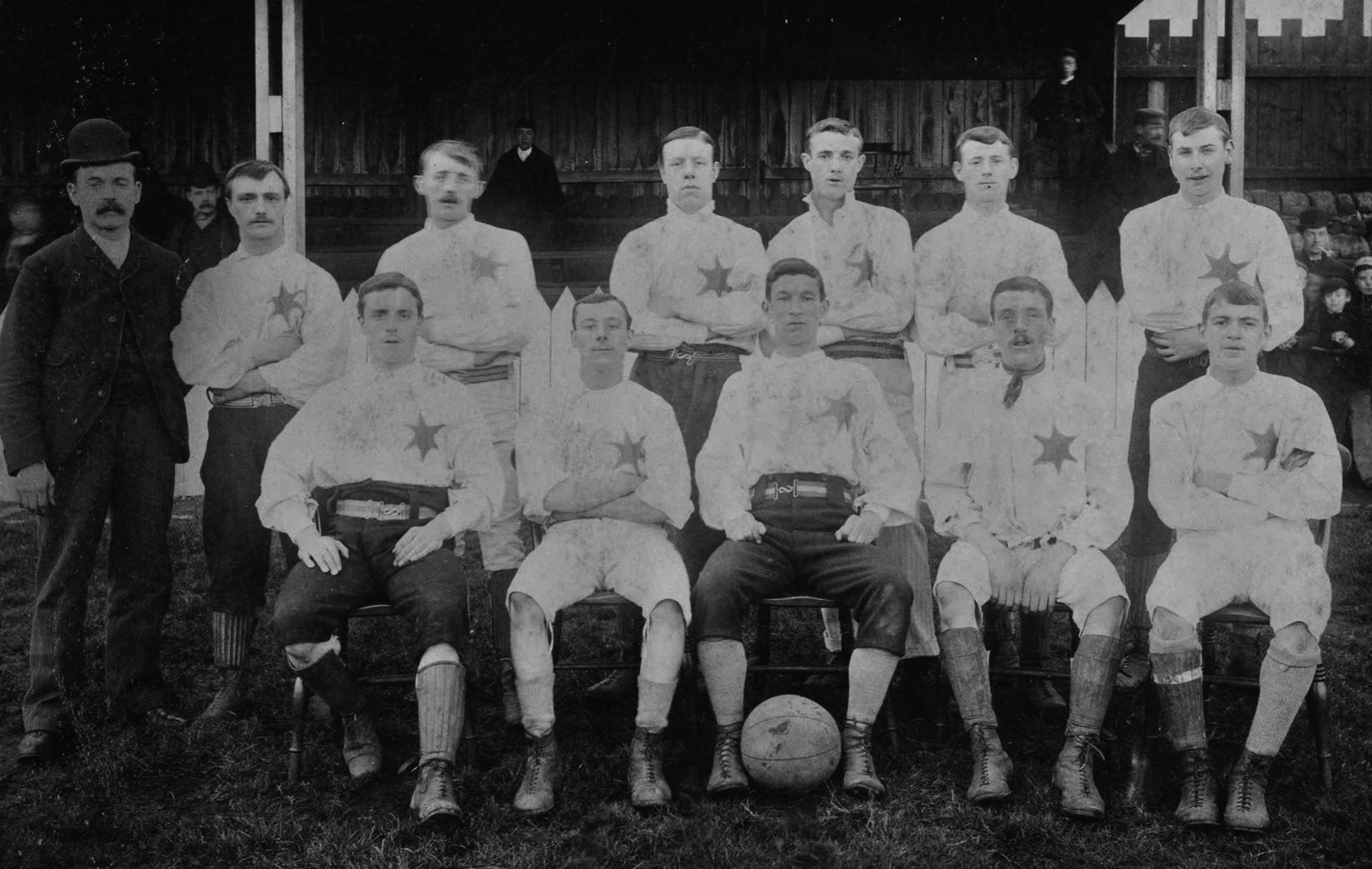
Astley Bridge Wanderers F.C., 1892–93

Although sides playing under the Astley Bridge Wanderers name are found as early as 1879, this particular club was founded in 1892, winning its first match, at home to Back-o'-the-Bank Druids, by 5 goals to 1.

=== Bolton & District League ===
The club played in the Bolton & District Junior League from 1892–93, and at the end of its first season played in the final of the Bolton Junior Charity Cup, losing 2–1 to Egerton Rovers at Bolton Wanderers' Pikes Lane. It grew quickly enough to attract 4,000 spectators to a home game with neighbour Halliwell Rovers in 1893–94.

The support however could be excessive. The club's defeat in the semi-final of the Bolton Amateur Cup in 1893–94, against Lytham at Leyland, was particularly vitriolic; the game was abandoned with 3 minutes to go, after referee Duxbury of Darwen was about to send off a Wanderers player (having already sent off Dyer), after disallowing "an apparently fair goal" for the Wanderers and allowing a goal for Lytham which "certainly went over the bar, a fact which was admitted by the Lytham men". The referee had to take refuge as fans threw stones at him, Dyer was banned for several months for refusing to leave the field after being sent off, and the club's protest against the refereeing was dismissed. The club's consolation was winning the Bolton & District League Cup for its first trophy.

On 9 February 1895, the club's half-back William Henworth, a piecer in a cotton mill, was injured in a match against Cox Green. He returned to work, but his injury grew worse, and on 16 February he died, the cause of death being put down to "periostitis or exhaustion", the coroner noting that Henworth "did not appear to be a strong lad" and "not in a condition to play football". The club recovered from this blow to win both the League Cup and the Victory Cup (a tournament between League members for charitable purposes), with wins over Halliwell Rovers and Victory Alliance respectively.

=== Lancashire Junior Cup runs ===
The club joined the Lancashire Football Association in 1895, entitling it to enter the Lancashire Junior Cup; in its first entry, the club won through the qualifying rounds to the competition proper, but lost in the second round at Blackburn Park Road, who went on to win the competition. The following season, the Bridgeites gained revenge by knocking the Roadsters out in the first round, but were unlucky to be drawn to visit the runner-up Skerton in the second round, and were duly eliminated - Skerton also proceeding to take the trophy. Wanderers finished 1896–97 by winning the Bolton & District League for the first time, topped off with the Victory Cup.

=== Bolton Wanderers nursery club ===
At the start of 1898, the club became "a sort of dry nurse" to Bolton Wanderers, with players being loaned from the senior club, and the senior club getting first refusal for the best junior players; however only two players (G. T. Smith and Baxendale) ever played for Bolton, and in both cases only briefly. The senior club therefore discontinued the experiment in May 1899.

=== Lancashire Alliance and Lancashire Combination ===
At the end of the 1897–98 season, the Bolton & District League fined the club £2 for "alleged bribery", the club's response to which was to join the higher-status Lancashire Alliance for 1898–99. The club started the season brightly, but faded to a mid-table finish, capped off by an 11–0 defeat at Earlestown, the Wanderers only playing with 9 men in a match which the hosts needed to win to secure the title. Before the 1899–1900 season started, joined an exodus of clubs to the Lancashire Combination, boosted by the arrival of a number of players from the recently-dissolved Halliwell Rovers - the club ended up signing over 50 players to a nominal payment to ensure protection against "poaching".

=== End of club ===
At the end of the 1899–1900 season, after finishing 15th out of 16 in the Combination, the Wanderers were evicted, and wound up. The club's final match was a 4–0 defeat at Burnley reserves in the Combination on 28 April. A new club with the same name played in the Bolton division of the Manchester & District Alliance in 1904.

== Colours ==
The club originally wore all white, with a blue six-star badge. By the 1893–94 season, it had changed to red jerseys.

== Ground ==
The club's ground was at Astley Meadow, the former home of Astley Bridge F.C.
