= Tyldesley Albion F.C. =

Football club in Lancashire, England

- Full name: Tyldesley Albion Football Club
- Nickname: the Bongs/Bongers
- Founded: 1901
- Dissolved: 1912
- Ground: Summerfield Lane
Home colours

Tyldesley Albion F.C. was an association football club from Tyldesley, Lancashire, active in the early 20th century.

== History ==
The earliest record of the club is of a 5–0 defeat at Atherton Volunteers in October 1901. In 1902–03 it joined the Eccles & District League and was soon attracting crowds of 2,000 en route to winning the title in its first season.

The club joined the Lancashire Alliance in 1904, and remained a member until the 1908–09 season. It was runner-up every season from 1905–06 to 1907–08, twice behind works sides, and once behind Ashton Town, which had just been de facto relegated from the Lancashire Combination. In 1906–07, the club recovered from a series of player disagreements (which required centre-forward Parry to take up a goalkeeping role, to much acclaim, while still retaining penalty-taker duties) to mount a championship challenge which included scoring 10 in one half against Newtown St Mark's, Leather scoring a double hat-trick.

Tyldesley did however have success in the Wigan Cup, winning in 1905–06 (coming from behind to beat Parr Rovers 2–1, at the ground of Ince Parish Church F.C.) and 1907–08 (an easy 3–0 win over Hindley Central - who had beaten the Bongers in the final in 1904–05, both finals being at Atherton).

The club split its 1908–09 season with the Manchester Football League before concentrating on the latter from 1909. It also entered the FA Cup for the only time in 1909–10, losing in a second replay to Walkden Central in the extra-preliminary round; the tie was played on neutral ground at Atherton, and Albion had a 3–1 half-time lead, but the score after 90 minutes was 3–3 and the Centralites scored three without reply in extra-time.

Towards the end of the 1910–11 season, the club applied to replace Ashton Town in the Combination; although Town's League position was hopeless, with bottom position guaranteed, taking over the place would have given Tyldesley an advantage for election as a member for the following season. Tyldesley was duly accepted as a member, but on the condition that it sought out a new XI to play in the Combination, while leaving its first XI to finish out the Manchester League season. Instead it did the opposite, sending its first XI to Hindley Central in its first Combination match, winning 3–2, while its reserves conceded 8 in the Manchester League in a dead-rubber with Rusholme. After the Manchester League protested, the Combination expelled Tyldesley after just one match, and Tyldesley quit the Manchester League in disgust at the end of the season.

It looked as if the Bongs' approach had cost the club a place in the Combination for 1911–12, as it failed to be elected to one of the available spots at the competition's meeting in July, Albion only securing 9 votes - 12 short of the number required for election. However, after a number of Football League clubs resigned from their co-membership of the Combination and their reserve sides were withdrawn, Albion was one of three clubs brought in to make up the numbers. Because of the late admission, it was a damp squib of a campaign, as Albion finished a mediocre 9th, and after playing one match in the 1912–13 season (a 3–0 defeat at Northwich Victoria on 7 September), Tyldesley did not turn up to its second match (at Barnoldswick) and was duly expelled again. As a consequence, with no prospect of league football, on 18 September 1912, the committee voted to disband the club. Albion was replaced in the Combination by Stalybridge Celtic's reserve XI, who finished second.

== Colours ==
The club wore red shirts.

== Ground ==
The club originally played at Tyldesley Common, requiring a fence to be put around the playing area to generate admission fees; it used the Imperial Inn for its facilities. In 1904, it procured the Lower Oak Street ground from the recently disbanded Tyldesley Alexandra and in 1907 moved to Summerfield Lane.

== Nickname ==
The club was nicknamed the Bongs or Bongers, deriving from a local nickname for the town.
