= Leigh Association F.C. =

Defunct association football club in England

- Full name: Leigh Association Football Club
- Founded: 1882
- Dissolved: 1896
- Ground: Leigh Athletic Club Ground
- Secretary: J. H. H. Smith (1880s), W. A. Monks (1892–93), G. James (1893–95)
Home colours

Leigh Association F.C. was an association football club from Leigh, Greater Manchester, active in the 19th century. The club's formal name was "Leigh Association" to avoid confusion with the already-existing Leigh rugby club.

== History ==
The club was founded in 1882, as a winter activity of the Leigh Cricket Club, and after two years the football club separated from the cricket. Its sole entry to the Lancashire Senior Cup, in 1885–86, ended at the first stage with an 18–0 hammering at the vastly more experienced Blackburn Olympic. Leigh was not helped by only turning up with ten men, and the only touch Olympic goalkeeper Thomas Hacking had was in scoring a goal when he went upfield for a corner.

Leigh was a founder member of the Lancashire Alliance (called the Lancashire Junior League in its first season) in 1889, finishing runner-up in 1889–90, but winning the title in 1890–91; the acrimony between Leigh and previous champions Hindley was such that, at a home game in January 1891, a Hindley mob attacked a referee after he disallowed two Hindley goals for offside. The replacement referee, Doctor Pemberton, one of the founder members of Leigh and who previously played on the right wing for the club, died the following month of pneumonia.

However, the following season the club was forced to move grounds, the increased expenditure in so doing having a deleterious effect on the quality of the side, two secretaries also resigning during the season, and it dropped to 8th in the Alliance table; in the Lancashire Junior Cup, the club seemingly beat Kearsley in the third round, but an appeal as to the state of the new Leigh pitch (touted at the start of the season as being nigh on waterproof) overturned the score, and Kearsley won the replay - and went on to win the trophy.

The 1892–93 season was similarly mediocre, and financial difficulties were beginning to bite; the club scratched from the Junior Cup before playing, having lost £27 over the ties the previous season. At the close of the season, with the club spending £116 on players' wages against an income of £167, and losing £10 overall in the season, the club took the fateful decision to turn amateur.

This doomed the club; gates dropped to a mere £12 in the 1893–94 season, which barely covered travel expenses, and in January 1894, "tired with being continually beaten", Leigh quit the Alliance mid-season; at the time of withdrawal, Leigh's record was 12 defeats from 12 games, with 8 goals for and 79 against. The defeats included an 8–0 defeat at home to Farnworth Standard in November, in which Farnworth knocked the ball around for the second half, as five of the Leigh players had had enough and left the pitch; and a 17–0 dismantling at Horwich, for which only four Leigh regulars turned up.

For the 1894–95 season, the club joined the amateur Manchester Alliance, in which it played without success for two seasons. The end of the club came in 1896, after an 11–0 defeat at Earlestown in the first qualifying round of the Junior Cup, Wigan Examiner - Wednesday 23 September 1896 when it was taken over by Leigh Wanderers and joined the Farnworth & District League - to no avail as the Wanderers did not see out the year.

== Colours ==
The club wore white shirts and "dark" knickers, probably referring to blue serge, commonly available.

== Ground ==
The club's first pitch was at Down Croft, next to the cricket club pitch. In 1887, the club moved to a ground at The Piggeries, on Railway Road. With that ground required for building work in 1891, Leigh moved to Twist Lane near the Railway Hotel. In 1894, with the club running out of finance, it moved to the Leigh Athletic Club Ground, and after the takeover by Wanderers to Wigan Road.

The largest recorded crowd was 3,000, for the top-of-the-table clash with Hindley on 31 January 1891, a replay of the match earlier in the month which had been abandoned because of fog, and which in turn was due to the interruption caused by Hindley fans trying to attack the referee.

== Notable players ==
- Jimmy Turner and brother Robert, both of whom had featured for Bolton Wanderers in the late 1880s, played for the club in the 1889–90 and 1890–91 seasons, Jimmy occasionally still turning out for Bolton.
- W. Unsworth, Bolton Wanderers' first-choice goalkeeper in the 1887–88 FA Cup campaign, joined the club in 1889, and later became club president.
