= Ashton Wanderers F.C. =

Football club from Manchester active from 1901 to 1903

- Full name: Ashton Wanderers Football Club
- Founded: 1901
- Dissolved: 1903
- Ground: Recreation Ground
Home colours

Ashton Wanderers F.C. was an association football club from Ashton-under-Lyne, Lancashire, active in the 1900s.

== History ==
There were two Wanderers clubs in existence in the 19th century, one being in effect the reserve side of Ashton-in-Makerfield), and the other active as a member of the Ashton and District Amateur League in 1898–99. but the instant club was founded in 1901, immediately joining the Lancashire Alliance. The club finished 7th out of 11 in its first season, but the club was only 5 points from second place. A highlight was a 9–0 hammering of Blackrod.

The club's second season turned out to be the club's last. The Wanderers won the Alliance championship, but, in so doing, recruited a large number of players in December 1902 (including three from the Birchley club, which had gone bust during the season). The recruitment raised suspicion, and the club was under investigation from February 1903, although allowed to play in the meantime. The Wanderers clinched the title with a 2–1 win over their local rivals Brynn Central, before a crowd of 4,000; the result was especially sweet as Brynn had won every previous engagement between the sides, spirits running so high in the November match at Brynn's Central Park that the home crowd rushed onto the pitch to attack Ashton's Makinson for a perceived foul.

Four days after the triumph, on 18 April 1903, the Lancashire Football Association suspended the club and its committee for a year. It had found that the club did not have proper contracts with its players, and had been promising illegal bonuses (4s. per win and 2s. or 3s. per draw depending on venue). The club had been planning to apply to join the Lancashire League, but instead disbanded.

== Colours ==
The club wore white shirts.

== Ground ==
The club's ground was simply known as the Recreation Ground. A crowd of 5,000 turned up for the derby with Brynn Central on 8 February 1902.
