= Park Lane Wanderers F.C. =

Association football club (1885–1897)

- Full name: Park Lane Wanderers Football Club
- Nicknames: the Laners, the Collier Lads
- Founded: 1885
- Dissolved: 1897
- Ground: Park Lane

Park Lane Wanderers F.C. was an association football club from Ashton-in-Makerfield, Lancashire, active in the late 19th century.

== History ==
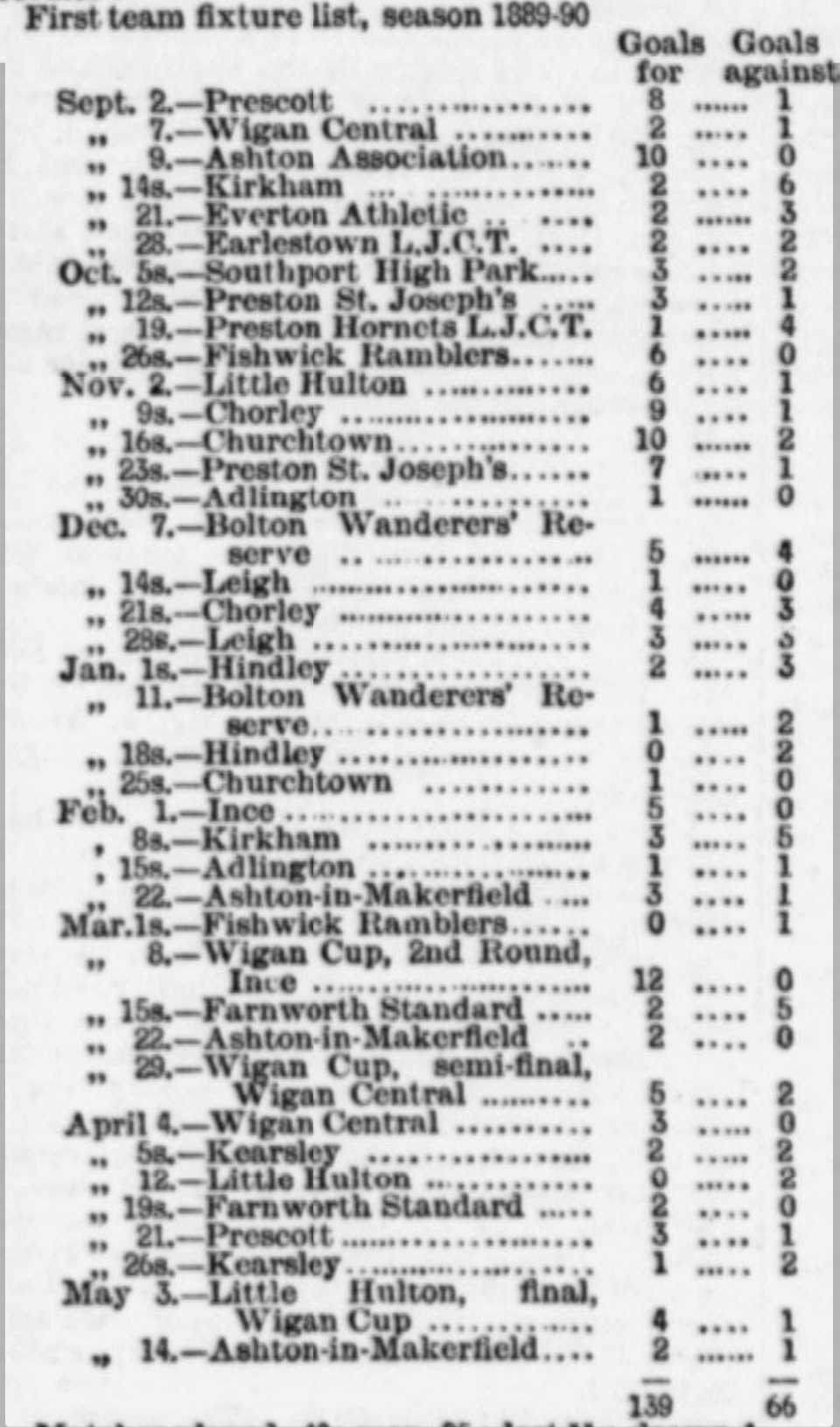
Park Lane Wanderers results in the 1889–90 season, Wigan Examiner, 31 May 1890. Fixtures where the date has "s" afterwards are fixtures in the Lancashire Junior League.

The first appearance of the club is as one of the founding members of the Wigan and District Football Association before the 1885–86 season. The club's earliest recorded match was a friendly with Nichol Lane Rising Star in September 1885, to raise funds for a reward to those who had assisted in recovering survivors of an explosion at Clifton Hall Colliery; the club's players were almost all mineworkers.

The club's first success came in winning the Wigan & District Cup in 1887–88. The Wanderers went on to retain the trophy for the next two seasons.

The club was a founder member of the Lancashire Alliance in 1889 - under its original name of the Lancashire Junior League - and in five full seasons of membership finished either 3rd or 4th in the table. For a brief period the club's President was Samuel Hill-Wood.

The club started the 1894–95 in the Alliance as normal, but in March, while in 5th place, was suspended for a month for signing a player without permission, and, as prevented the club from finishing the season, its record was expunged. This caused problems for Haydock, which had apparently won the title, but after the removal of the 7 points the club had won against Wanderers and Farnworth Standard (who had also withdrawn), the title was back up in the air - albeit Haydock did eventually clinch the championship.

The Wanderers returned to the Alliance in 1895–96, but wore black armbands in its first game, as one of its players - 26-year-old James Smalley, and brother of the club's centre-half Peter Smalley - died before the first game of the season; fittingly his brother scored the first in a 2–1 win. The Laners struggled to a low finish, and although the club bounced back to a 4th place finish in 1896–97, it disbanded in the summer owing to lack of support - mot of its players joined Ashton-in-Makerfield.

== Ground ==
The club originally played at Rose Hill; by 1889 it had moved to Park Lane, near Brynn Station. It used the Oddfellows' Arms for facilities. The grandstand was bought by Haydock in 1898.

== Notable players ==
- William H. Walker, who played for the club in the 1890s, before moving south, where he played for Brentford in the Southern League, and was also a capable cricketer, once dismissing W. G. Grace caught and bowled when playing for the Ealing Cricket Club.
