= Tommy Wilson (footballer, born 1877) =

English footballer

Thomas Carter Wilson (20 October 1877 – 30 August 1940) was an English footballer who played as a forward. Born in Preston, he played for Manchester United, Ashton-in-Makerfield, West Manchester, Ashton Town, Ashton North End, Oldham County, Swindon Town, Blackburn Rovers, Millwall Athletic, Queen's Park Rangers, Aston Villa, Bolton Wanderers and Leeds City.
