= Lancashire Alliance =

Defunct football league in England

- Founded: 1889
- Abolished: 1935
- Region: Lancashire
- Most championships: Haydock (3 titles)

The Lancashire Alliance was an association football league competition, which was active before the Second World War.

== History ==
=== Early years ===
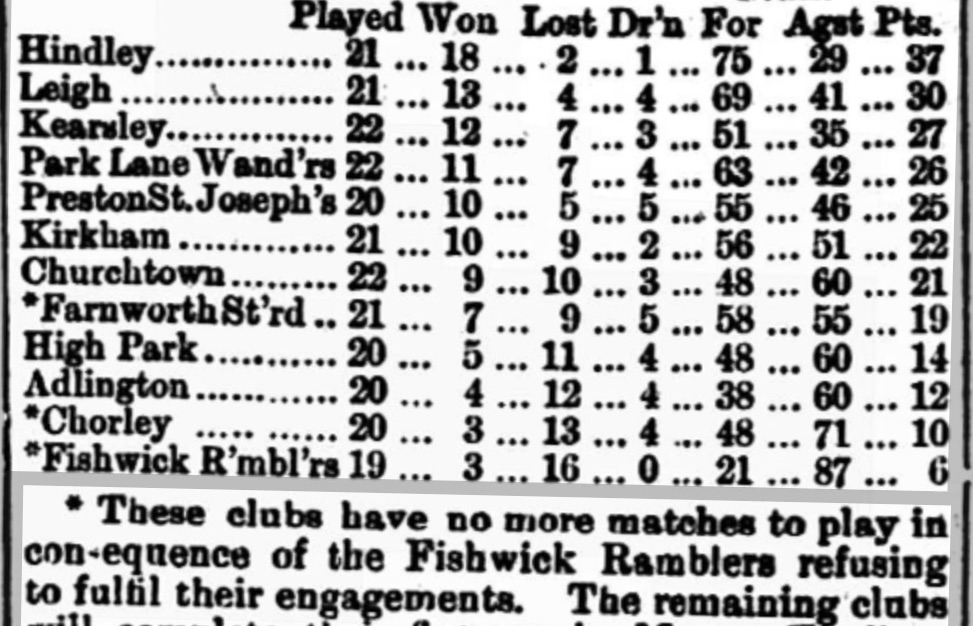
Lancashire Junior League as at 9 May 1890, from the Leigh Chronicle

The competition was founded in 1889, as the Lancashire Junior League. The founder members were Adlington, Chorley, Farnworth Standard, Hindley, High Park, Churchtown, Preston St Joseph's, Fishwick Ramblers, Leigh Association, Park Lane Wanderers, Kearsley, and Kirkham, with Hindley taking the first title. Before the 1890–91 season, the competition was renamed the Lancashire Alliance.

For the competition's first two seasons, there was no trophy for clubs to play for, only a championship flag. The trophy - a silver cup on an ebony base, worth 40 guineas - was first presented to Lytham in May 1892.

The Alliance enjoyed stability and some prestige in its early years, becoming a de facto feeder league for the Lancashire League and Lancashire Combination, and its clubs enjoyed considerable success in the Lancashire Junior Cup - Alliance members who won the Cup included Kearsley (1891–92), Chorley (1893–94), Lytham (1894–95), and Skerton (1897–98 and 1898–99), and runners-up included Parr (1901–02).

=== Exodus in 1899 and 1903 ===
The first crisis for the Alliance came after the 1898–99 season, when its top four clubs all left for the Lancashire League or Lancashire Combination, and the 1899–1900 season had a mere seven clubs. It built back to a fuller complement of twelve clubs for 1902–03, but, at the end of that season, the League and Combination merged. As a consequence of the merger, a second Combination division was formed, which opened up fresh places for new clubs. As a result, many Alliance members left to join the revamped Combination. Even Thomas Laithwaite - the chairman and secretary of the Alliance, and secretary of Chorley St George's, one of the clubs leaving the Alliance for the Combination - joined the Combination's executive committee.

Only three clubs from the 1902–03 season continued into the 1903–04, and champion Ashton Wanderers had been put under a season-long suspension (from which the club never emerged) by the Lancashire Football Association for breaching professionalism rules. Unlike previously, when the Alliance set its face against allowing in reserve sides, and following an interim season saw only seven clubs take part, the Alliance conceded that the only way to survive as a competition was to permit reserve sides of former members. These members ultimately included the second XIs of Brynn Central, Ashton Town, Atherton Church House, and St Helens Recreation, and the Alliance never re-gained its former level of prestige.

=== West Lancashire League withdrawals ===
The competition suffered a further blow after the 1908–09 season, with the formation of the West Lancashire League, which drew the attention of "practically all of the clubs below Preston". The 1909–10 season ended in controversy. Standish North End had disbanded near the end of the season, but the Alliance, rather than expunging its fixtures or finding a replacement club, simply left its record "as was". This cost Adlington a chance at winning the title, as removing the North End fixtures would have left Adlington level on points with Chorley reserves, which, under the regulations, would have required a play-off.

=== 1910 degrading ===
The Alliance looked to expand in 1910 by introducing a second division, incorporating the Wigan & District League as a first step, but the attempt seemed to have the opposite effect - every club which had started the 1909–10 season (other than Appley Bridge) left for other competitions, and an entirely new set of clubs had to be recruited to avoid the Alliance disbanding. Long-term member Adlington also left as a result of the previous season's title controversy.

The level of the Alliance was now such that Coppull Central, which took part in the 1909–10 season, but left for the West Lancashire Alliance from the 1910–11 season onwards, now fielded a reserve side in the Alliance. The stay of execution only lasted one year, and after the 1910–11 season the competition was disbanded, with only five clubs pledged for the competition by August 1911.

The competition was revived in 1912, under the administration of the faithful Laithwaite and Mr Witter of Appley Bridge (who donated £5 towards championship medals), but only ran for two more seasons, with only 7 and 6 clubs in each season.

=== Post-World War 1 seasons ===
After the First World War, the competition was re-constituted, being restricted to clubs in the south of the county, between Liverpool and Manchester. However, unlike before the War, the Alliance was not under the control of the Lancashire Football Association; given its more limited ambition it was under the oversight of the Liverpool FA, which led to a debate as to whether the "new" Alliance had title to the trophy of the "old" Alliance. Ultimately the Lancashire FA agreed to hand the trophy over for presentation to the 1920–21 champion, Stormy Albion of Skelmersdale, in May 1921.

This lower-key Alliance continued until the 1935–36 season, when a number of clubs either went under or joined the West Lancashire Alliance. Before the season was due to start, the Alliance took over the remnants of the similarly affected Warrington Football League, but this was not enough to keep the competition going.

There was an attempt to revive the League for the 1937–38 season, but, despite eight clubs expressing an interest, the attempt failed. The trophy was retained by the Wigan Football Alliance as a competition prize.

== Member clubs until 1910 ==
The following clubs played in the competition until its loss of first-class status in 1910:

- Abram Colliery 1900–03
- Adlington 1889–1901, 1902–10
- Appley Bridge 1909–10
- Ashton-in-Makerfield 1891–98
- Ashton Town 1907–08
- Ashton Town reserves 1904–06
- Ashton Wanderers 1901–03
- Astley Bridge Wanderers 1898–99
- Atherton Church House 1902–04
- Atherton Church House reserves 1904–10
- Bamfurlong Rovers 1896–99
- Belle Green 1900–03
- Birchley 1901–02
- Birkenhead Locos 1898–99
- Blackrod 1901–02
- Bolton St Luke's 1902–03
- Brynn Central 1900–03
- Brynn Central reserves 1903–04
- Cheetham Hill 1891–92
- Chorley 1889–94
- Chorley reserves 1909–10
- Chorley Atheneum 1905–06
- Chorley St George's 1900–03
- Churchtown 1889–91
- Coppull Central 1909–10
- Earlestown 1894–99
- Earlestown YMCA 1909–10
- Farnworth Alliance 1905–06
- Farnworth Standard 1889–94
- Fishwick Ramblers 1889–90
- Fleetwood Amateurs 1907–08
- Golborne 1891–96
- Haigh 1902–03, 1904–05
- Haydock 1891–99
- High Park (Southport) 1889–91
- High Park (Warrington) 1899–1900
- Hindley 1889–97
- Hindley Central 1903–10
- Hindley Green 1905–06
- Ince Parish Church 1909–10
- Horwich (L&Y) 1891–97
- Horwich RMI 1907–08
- Kearsley 1889–95
- Kirkham 1889–91, 1905–08
- Leigh Association 1889–93
- Leyland 1897–98, 1903–08
- Little Hulton United 1905–08
- Little Lever 1890–95
- Lostock Hall 1894–95
- Lytham 1890–94
- Middleton 1894–99
- Newton-le-Willows 1908–10
- Newtown (St Mark's) 1901–02, 1904–07
- North Meols 1893–95
- Oldham Athletic reserves 1906–07
- Park Lane Wanderers 1889–94, 1895–96
- Parr 1898–1901
- Parr Rovers 1904–05
- Pemberton 1900–1903
- Platt Bridge 1903–04
- Prescot 1895–1901
- Preston St Joseph's 1889–90
- St Helens Recs 1897–99
- St Helens Recs reserves 1904–05, 1906–09
- Seacombe Swifts 1899–1900
- Skelmersdale United 1895–99, 1901–03, 1907–09
- Skerton 1892–97
- Southport Central 1901–03
- Southport Central reserves 1903–08
- Standish North End 1908–10
- Standish United 1904–05
- Stubshaw Cross 1896–97
- Tonge 1894–95
- Tranmere Rovers 1899–1900
- Turton 1906–07
- Tyldesley Albion 1904–09
- Walkden Central 1904–09
- Walkden Central reserves 1909–10
- Warrington 1899–1900
- Whiston 1896–99
- Westhoughton 1904–05
- Wigan County reserves 1897–98
- Wigan Territorials 1909–10

Peasley Cross started the 1899–1900 season, but, after two wins in eight matches, did not turn up to matches with Adlington and Warrington, resulting in its record being expunged.

== Champions ==
List of champions
Season	Champions
1889–90	Hindley
1890–91	Leigh Association
1891–92	Lytham
1892–93	Chorley
1893–94	Haydock
1894–95	Haydock
1895–96	Earlestown
1896–97	Skerton
1897–98	Haydock
1898–99	Earlestown
1899–1900	Prescot
1900–01	Parr
1901–02	Skelmersdale United
1902–03	Ashton Wanderers
1903–04	Adlington
1904–05	Walkden Central
1905–06	Atherton Church House Reserves
1906–07	Oldham Athletic Reserves
1907–08	Ashton Town
1908–09	Adlington
1909–10	Chorley Reserves
1910–11	Goose Green
1912–13	Golbourne United
1913–14	Burscough Rangers
1920–21	Stormy Albion
1921–22	Orrell YMCA
1924–25	Hindley Green Celtic
1928–29	Golborne Road
1929–30	Golborne Road
1930–31	Hindsford
1931–32	Hindsford
1932–33	Tyldesley United
1933–34	Billinge
1934–35	Astley & Tyldesley
