= Lostock Hall F.C. =

Defunct association football club in England

- Full name: Lostock Hall Football Club
- Nickname: the Hallites
- Founded: 1882
- Dissolved: 1897
- Ground: Lostock Hall Station
- Secretary: W. Rigby
Home colours

Lostock Hall F.C. was an association football club from Lostock Hall, near Preston, Lancashire, active in the 19th century.

== History ==
The first reference to football at Lostock Hall is of a tournament played in 1881, as part of an athletic games taking place in a field near the hall. This may have inspired the formation of a side, as a Lostock Hall club is recorded as playing in January 1882.

In March 1882, Lostock Hall hammered Preston North End 5–0 at home in a friendly, the visitors having to rely on five volunteers from the crowd as half the side had missed the train. However, when Lostock Hall's secretary tried to arrange fixtures with North End in the 1883–84 season, he was told that North End was setting its heights higher, arranging friendlies with the likes of Blackburn Rovers and Darwen. This led to a vitriolic and sarcastic response from Lostock Hall describing Preston's "vain conceitedness", and that North End would have been "entirely unfit to be named against the meanest team" had it not been for it being "fortunate enough in pecuniary matters". However North End had a point - it reached the fourth round of the 1883–84 FA Cup, before being disqualified for professionalism, while Lostock Hall had not yet even entered the Lancashire Senior Cup.

=== Lancashire Senior Cup ===
When the club did enter the Senior Cup for the first time, in 1884–85, it reached the fourth round (last 13), having scored 17 goals in its first three ties. In the fourth round, drawn to visit Church, the Hallites "created a very favourable impression amongst the spectators" with "pretty" passing and combination play, and by "playing up to the finish"; however the club conceded 6 goals between the 15th and 45th minute, and went down by 9 goals to 0. The following season it lost 4–0 at Blackburn Rovers in the first round, the Rovers sending a reserve side as the first XI had a lucrative friendly with Accrington on the same date.

=== Lancashire Junior Cup ===
The Lancashire Junior Cup was introduced in 1885–86 for amateur sides, and Lostock Hall turned its attentions there. In 1886–87, boosted by attracting three players from the senior Bolton Association F.C., it beat the holders Bell's Temperance in the fourth round, at the fifth time of asking. However the Accrington-based side successfully appealed the defeat on the basis that Lostock had fielded professionals, and the result was reversed. Bell's Temperance went on to retain the trophy.

=== Lancashire Combination ===
In 1893 Lostock Hall was elected to the Lancashire Combination, and finished 5th out of 10, second of the non-reserve sides, a particular highlight being a 12–0 win over Ardwick reserves, albeit the visitors only turned up with 8 men. Despite this decent result, a re-election process following an amalgamation with the North-east Lancashire League saw Lostock Hall finish 15th in the balloting for the 14 available spaces. For 1894–95 therefore it was elected to the Lancashire Alliance instead, receiving 6 out of 10 possible votes, and finished 6th out of 14. The Hallites briefly held the joint record win in the competition, by beating Kearsley by 17 goals to nil in January; eventual champion Haydock went three better in April. The win over Kearsley however was more remarkable, as it came away from home, and was four days after Lostock Hall had beaten Padiham by 17 goals to nil in the Junior Cup - albeit Padiham had sent a deliberately weak team in protest at the Lancashire Football Association's decision to order a replay of the tie to take place at Lostock Hall, the original game at Padiham ending goalless but in darkness, and extra-time not being possible.

=== End of the club ===
Lostock Hall returned to the Combination in 1895, but its second Combination season was a disaster, finishing bottom, with only 1 win, and even that came in the first home match of the season, 2–1 against Darwen reserves. The club continued in the Preston & District League in 1896–97, placing 4th out of 12, but there is no record of the club afterwards. The name was briefly revived in the 1920s.

== Colours ==
The club wore pink and white jerseys.

== Ground ==
The club's ground was described as being near Preston Junction railway station, and near Lostock Hall railway station.

== Notable players ==
- Tom Bradshaw, outside-right who left the club in 1896 and had over a hundred Football League appearances.
- Robert Smalley, goalkeeper, whom Everton "poached" from the club in 1887.
