= Kirkham F.C. =

Former association football club from Lancashire

- Nickname: the Linen Manufacturers
- Founded: 1880
- Dissolved: 1912
- Ground: Freckleton Road
Home colours

Kirkham F.C. was an association football club from Kirkham, Lancashire, active in the 19th century.

== History ==
The club was founded in 1880. It played in the Lancashire Senior Cup from 1881–82 to 1884–85, before the Lancashire Junior Cup was created for the smaller sides in the county. Its first tie was plum draw at home to Blackburn Rovers, one of the strongest sides in the world, and although the match ended in a 14–0 win for the visiting side, the tie was considered a positive experience, as "the skill and dexterity shown by the Blackburn team cannot fail to throw fresh impetus on the dribbling game in the Fylde district"; the two sides spent a "substantial dinner" and "jovial evening" afterwards in the New Inn. However Kirkham never won a tie in the competition.

It was a founder member of the Lancashire Alliance in 1889, the competition being called the Lancashire Junior League for its first season. After a fourth-place finish in 1890–91, the club had a debt of over £100 owed to the treasurer, despite which the club turned professional, with the hope of paid players being able to bring in a higher gate. The gamble did not work - Kirkham withdrew from the Alliance in March 1892, with the club languishing in 12th position out of 14. With the club's debt was still at £111, and only existing thanks to the continuing £90 loan from the club treasurer, it did not seek re-election. The club's final 19th century match in the competition had been a defeat at local rivals Lytham, which led to Lytham supporters issuing funeral cards to celebrate Kirkham's resignation.

The club eventually found a berth with the Preston and District League in 1894 and took the title in 1898–99. The club re-joined the Alliance in 1905, and after two mid-table finishes, dropped to 13th out of 15 in 1907–08. At the end of the season, Kirkham did not seek re-election, instead joining the new West Lancashire League to save on travel expenses.

The club finally collapsed before the 1911–12 season, a new Kirkham club being formed in August 1912.

== Colours ==
The earliest recorded colours for the club are black and amber "striped" (i.e. hooped) jerseys, cap, and stockings, with white knickerbockers. In 1884 the club changed the jerseys to amber and black "quarters", which in the context of the times refers to counterchanged halves, first donned in a November friendly with Lower Darwen. By the end of the decade, the club's finances were evidently in such a state that players were wearing a gallimaufry of colours - two in the amber and black, three in white, and the remainder in blue and white in an 1889 match at Preston St Joseph - that the following season it adopted a simple (and inexpensive) white shirts and (serge) blue knickers, the club thereafter cleaving to white shirts.

== Ground ==
The club originally played at Station Road. By 1908 the club was playing at Freckleton Road.

== Notable players ==
- Ernest Whiteside, inside-right who briefly played with the club in the mid-1900s before ending up at Bolton Wanderers.
