= Arthur Rosbotham =

English footballer

Personal information
- Full name: Arthur Rosbotham
- Date of birth: 18 February 1892
- Place of birth: Ince-in-Makerfield, England
- Date of death: 1941 (aged 48–49)
- Position: Inside forward

Senior career*
Years	Team	Apps	(Gls)
1911–1912	Atherton		
1912–1914	Eccles Borough		
1914–1915	Nelson		
1919–1920	Preston North End	0	(0)
1919–1920	Chorley		
1920	Arsenal	0	(0)
1920–1922	Stockport County	21	(3)
1922–1923	Southport	17	(3)
1923–1924	Chorley		
1924–1925	Barrow	17	(7)
1925	Chorley		
1925	Rossendale United		
1926	Colwyn Bay United		
1927	Winsford United		
Total		55	(13)
- * Club domestic league appearances and goals

Arthur Rosbotham (18 February 1892 – 1941) was an English footballer who played in the Football League for Barrow, Southport and Stockport County.
