= Hindley Central F.C. =

Defunct association football club in England

- Full name: Hindley Central Football Club
- Nickname: Central
- Founded: 1902
- Dissolved: 1915
- Ground: Ladies Lane
1902–09 colours	1909–15 colours

Hindley Central F.C. was an association football club from Hindley, Lancashire, active in the early 20th century.

== History ==
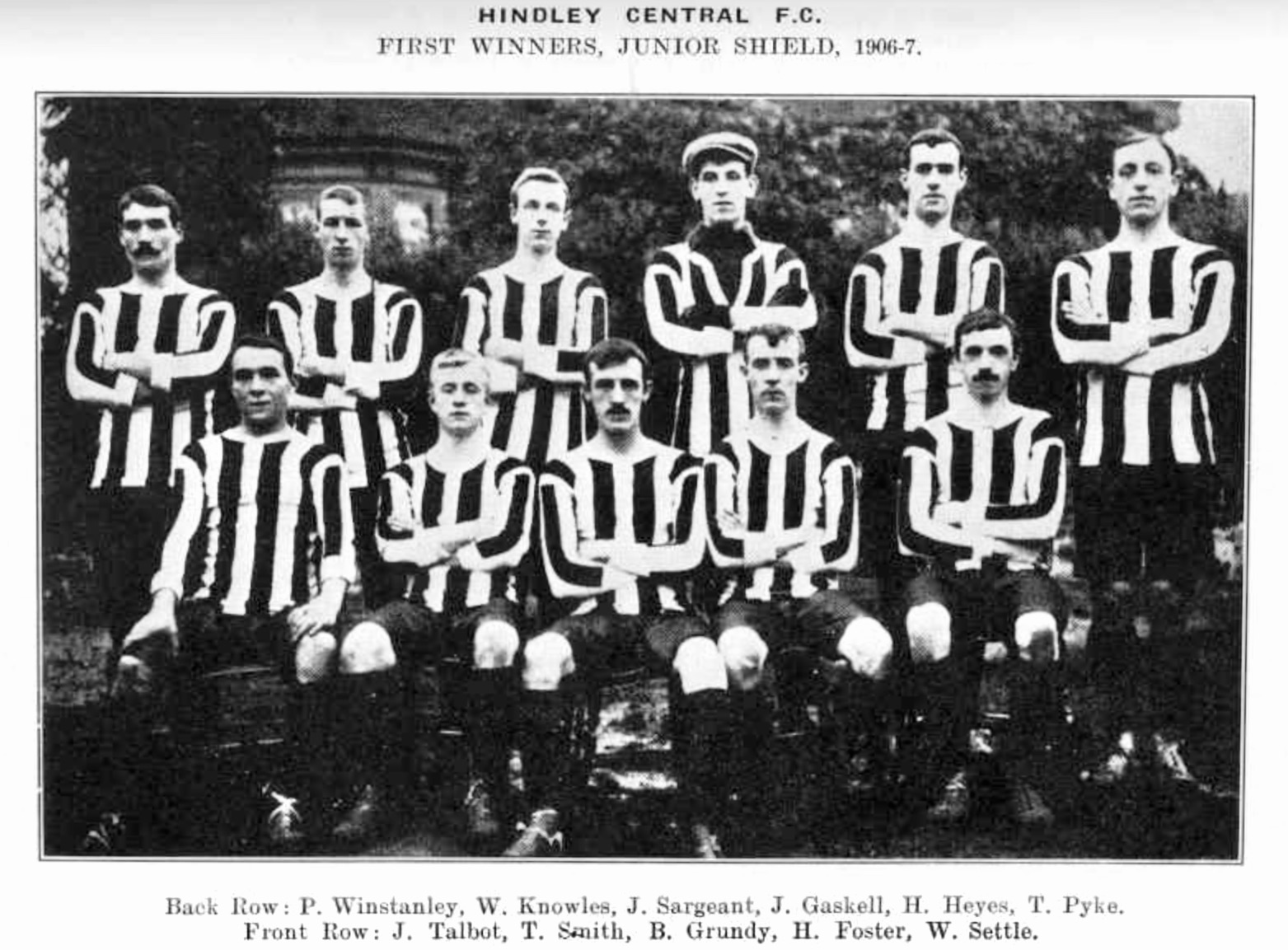
The Hindley Central side which won the Lancashire Junior Shield in the 1906–07 season

Hindley Central was founded in 1902, and immediately joined the Wigan Amateur League. The club finished fourth in what turned out to be its only season in the competition (and won the Hindley Cricket Club medal competition), as it joined the Lancashire Alliance in 1903, which was desperate for members after a number of clubs had quit, and in the competition's interim 7-team competition in 1903–04, was runner-up behind Adlington. The club was in the running for the 1909–10 championship, in a season tainted by the withdrawal of Standish North End (whose record was allowed to stand), but finished 3rd.

The club won the Wigan Cup in 1904–05, beating Tyldesley Albion in the final at Adlington. The following season it beat neighbour club Hindley Green in the final of the new Lancashire Shield competition, which had been set up as a subsidiary competition, as the Lancashire Junior Cup was being dominated by clubs in the Lancashire Combination and Lancashire League. Before the match, a drunk supporter, John Halton, turned up with a gun and ammunition, to fire off a celebratory shot for every Central goal; he was arrested before he went in and magistrates fined him 5 shillings.

Central and Tyldesley met again in the Wigan Cup final at Adlington in 1907–08, but this time the "Bongers" were the hot favourites, and justified the tag with an easy 3–0 victory.

In 1910, it formed part of the exodus of clubs leaving the Alliance to join the Lancashire Combination, and had mid-table finishes until its final season in 1913–14; initially incurring a significant amount of debt competing at the higher level, the club had cleared its balance sheet by June 1913. In May 1914, the local council - the club's landlord - gave it notice to quit Ladies Lane. Although the First World War put matters on hold, the club petered out in 1915, the name being used by a junior side from 1917.

== Colours ==
The club originally wore black and white striped shirts. In 1909 it adopted red shirts and black knickers.

== Ground ==
The club played at Ladies Lane, the former home of Hindley.

== Notable players ==
- Wilf Woodcock, inside-forward, who later played for Manchester United.
- Tommy Fleetwood, who scored twice for Hindley Central against Rochdale in the first round of the 1908–09 Lancashire Junior Cup, but who joined Dale in 1910.
- Joe Haywood, wing-half for the club in the early 1910s, who joined Manchester United in 1913.
