= Iddon =

Iddon is a surname. Notable people with the surname include:

- Brian Iddon (born 1940), British politician
- Christian Iddon (born 1985), British motorcycle racer
- Jack Iddon (1902–1946), British cricketer
- Richard Iddon (1901–1975), British footballer
