= Hindley F.C. =

Defunct association football club in Manchester, England

- Full name: Hindley Football Club
- Nicknames: the Demons, Colliers
- Founded: 1883
- Dissolved: 1899
- Ground: Ladies Lane
- Chairman: Tom Laithwaite
- Secretary: J. Ramwell
Home colours

Hindley Football Club was an association football club from Hindley, Greater Manchester, active in the 1890s.

== History ==
The club was founded at a meeting at the Red Lion Hotel in Hindley on 31 August 1883; although initially uncertain whether to play association or rugby union, the choice of the round ball game was cemented after the success of a home friendly with Bolton Wanderers in September.

In 1885–86, Hindley became the first winner of the Wigan Cup, in extraordinary circumstances. The final was scheduled to be against Wigan A.F.C. at the latter's ground, Wigan's semi-final opponent Westhoughton having been disqualified for professionalism. However the Westhoughton side turned up to the final to claim the match; after confusion in which the Westhoughton side sought to occupy the Wigan half, Wigan eventually won 2–0, before Westhoughton's disqualification was overturned, which meant the final had to be re-played, this time with Hindley facing Westhoughton at Ashton-in-Makerfield. Westhoughton was claimed to be the odds-on favourite, but conceded an early own-goal - the only goal of the game. Paying players under the counter was an issue in the area - the following season, Hindley faced protests that goalkeeper Tom Richards was a paid professional, and therefore ineligible; Richards defended himself in the media, stating he would rather retire than accept payment.

In 1889, it was a founder member of the Lancashire Junior League, and was the competition's first champion, even after having to re-play a match with Leigh Association after the conclusion of the season, when Leigh protested against three of Hindley's players; Hindley won the re-match to secure a 9-point lead over the runner-up - which just happened to be Leigh. In 1890 the competition's name changed to the Lancashire Alliance and Hindley remained a member until 1896–97, apart from the 1891–92 season, when it was a founder member of the Lancashire Combination. Hindley finished second in the eight-club Combination, five points behind Blackburn Rovers reserves; it was however the club's only season in the competition, as it resolved to join the North-East Lancashire League instead at the season's end. In the end the club re-joined the Alliance.

The club's return to the Alliance was initially promising, finishing a close runner-up in 1894–95, entitling the players to medals "of equal value" to those of champion club Haydock; however the cost was significant, the balance being "on the wrong side significantly". Hindley thereupon went on a slow decline, and although it started the 1897–98 season in the Lancashire Alliance (having failed with an ambitious bid to join the Lancashire League), it "was in such low circumstances" that it could not complete it, withdrawing in November; Prescot was elected to take over Hindley's fixtures. The Alliance gave the club another chance in 1898–99, and the club even entered the FA Cup for the first time, beating Blackburn Park Road 6–1 in the first qualifying round. However history repeated in the Combination, as again Hindley failed to turn up to fixtures, and failed to pay fines for so doing, resulting in the Alliance expelling the club in December. Hindley had only won one of its seven matches. The final blow was an order from the Football Association in January 1889 to pay expenses to Workington after a defeat in the second qualifying round of the Cup; rather than do so, the club disbanded.

== Colours ==
Its original colours were red and white stripes. By the end of 1888 the club had adopted white shirts.

== Ground ==
The club played at Ladies Lane.

== Nickname ==
The club gained its nickname of "the Demons", or "the Little Demons", "from its good play".
