= Chorley St George's F.C. =

Former association football club in Lancashire

- Full name: Chorley St George's Football Club
- Nickname: Chorley Saints
- Founded: 1895
- Dissolved: 1905
- Ground: St George's Park
- Secretary: C. Morey
Home colours

Chorley St George's F.C. was an association football club from Chorley, Lancashire, active in the 1900s.

== History ==
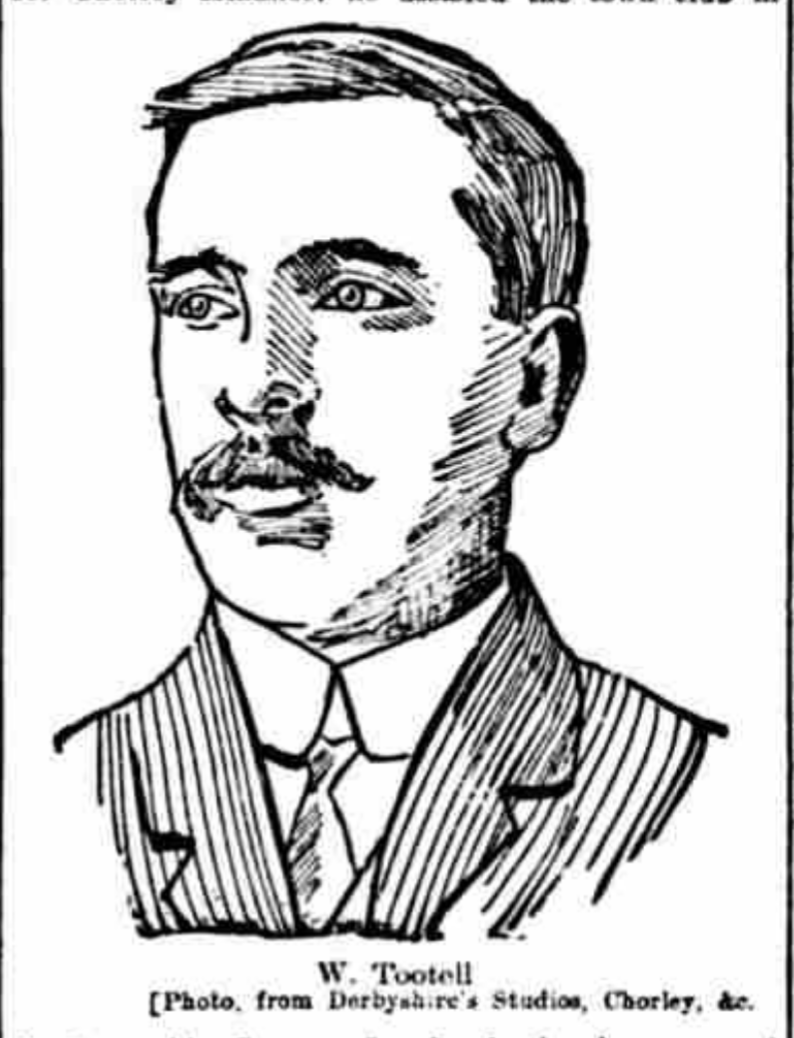
W. Tootell, Chorley St George captain in 1901–04, Lancashire Daily Post, 23 December 1905

The earliest reference to the club is its joining the Lancashire Football Association in August 1895, losing its first competitive match - at Farington Mill in the Lancashire Junior Cup a month later - by 8 goals to 3.

It originally played in the Preston & District and Chorley & District Amateur Leagues, and joined the Lancashire Alliance in 1900. It gradually moved up the table, finishing 6th, 6th, and 4th in 1900–01, 1901–02, and 1902–03 respectively. In the 1901–02 season, the club gained its greatest honour, beating Brynn Central 5–1 at home to win the Wigan Cup.

In the summer of 1903, the club was part of an exodus of clubs which joined the expanding Lancashire Combination, with even Thomas Laithwaite, the club's secretary and chairman of the Alliance, becoming a member of the Combination executive.

However the club only lasted one season in the Combination, finishing 17th out of 18 in the second division. The club optimistically announced its intention to continue, provided that it survived the re-election process, but failed in its bid.

The rejection awoke talk of a merger with Chorley F.C., under the putative name Chorley Athletic, and the town club swooped to sign Saints' Tom Clarke and Edwin Dempsey, but Chorley Saints re-grouped and re-joined the Alliance, and in September 1904 advertised for players for all positions to join the club. However, by the end of the year, the club had resorted solely to playing local "youths" to get the finances back on track. It was to no avail; after a 4–2 defeat at Southport Central in February 1905 left the club second from bottom of the table, with 9 points from 13 games (and several games behind the remainder of the division), the club quit the league; the club itself blamed league organization, while the media pointed to "scanty" support.

Chorley Saints entered the 1905–06 Junior Cup, but was given permission to scratch from its tie, and never appeared again.

== Colours ==
The club wore red shirts.

== Ground ==
The club played at St George's Park. It was considered superior to Chorley F.C.'s Rangletts ground, and, with Chorley Saints moribund, Chorley moved into St George's Park in August 1905.

== Notable players ==
- Edwin Dempsey went on to play for Bolton Wanderers in the Football League.
