= Bill Graham (footballer) =

English footballer

Personal information
- Full name: William Graham
- Date of birth: 14 October 1893
- Place of birth: Preston, England
- Date of death: 1978 (aged 73–74)
- Position: Inside forward

Senior career*
Years	Team	Apps	(Gls)
- Dick Kerr's XI
1920–1922	Lancaster Town		
1922–1924	Northampton Town	49	(10)
1924–1925	Wrexham	6	(2)
1925–1926	Lancaster Town		
1926–1927	Great Harwood		
1927–1928	Burscough Rangers		
1928–1929	Lytham		
- * Club domestic league appearances and goals

William Graham (14 October 1893 – 1978) was an English professional footballer who played as an inside forward. He made appearances in the English Football League for Northampton Town and Wrexham.
