= St Helens Recreation =

St Helens Recreation could refer to:

- St Helens Recreation RLFC, a rugby league club
- St Helens Recreation F.C., an association football club
