= Kearsley F.C. =

Association football club active in the 19th century

- Full name: Kearsley Football Club
- Nickname: the Reds
- Founded: 1879
- Dissolved: 1895
- Ground: Higher Market Street
- Capacity: c. 4,000
- Secretary: J. Wood
Home colours

Kearsley F.C was an association football club from Farnworth, Lancashire, active in the 1890s.

== History ==
The first reference to the club is from 1879, as an offshoot of the Kearsley Cricket Club. Despite the club's name referencing the village of Kearsley, the club played its home matches in the larger village of Farnworth.

Its first notable appearance was with its joining the Lancashire Football Association in 1884–85, and its first appearance came in that season's Lancashire Senior Cup, which at the time had not yet hived off smaller teams into the Lancashire Junior Cup. As a result, the club was put in the draw with much more experienced clubs, and was hammered 11–0 at home in the first round to Higher Walton. It was the club's only match in the competition.

The club's first final came in a 13 team tournament for a 15 gns cup, which the club itself arranged, at the end of the 1886–87 season, although it lost 2–1 to Farnworth Standard.

It was a founder member of the Lancashire Alliance in 1889, which for the first season was called the Lancashire Junior League. Its greatest honour was winning the Junior Cup in 1891–92, beating Southport Central 1–0 in the final at Deepdale, before a remarkable crowd of 9,000, the winning goal coming via a smart shot from Whittaker after 20 minutes. The same season, the club finished runner-up in the Alliance, five points behind champion Lytham. Kearsley's defence of the trophy in 1892–93 was strong, reaching the final again, The against Clitheroe at Ewood Park; however Clitheroe won 4–0, despite losing Ratcliffe to injury just after scoring.

The Reds however could not keep up such success. After a mid-table finish in 1892–93, the club applied unsuccessfully to join the Lancashire League, and in 1893–94 dropped to the very bottom of the Alliance, with only 3 wins from 26 matches. It was saved from a re-election risk by the expansion of the competition. The club hosted an athletics meeting before the 1894–95 to raise funds; this was standard practice, but for Kearsley this was the first - and, as it would turn out, the last - time it would do so.

The 1894–95 season was even worse for the club, again finishing bottom with 3 wins, the nadir being a 20–0 defeat at Haydock in April, the all-time record defeat in the league - three months after the club had equalled the record with a 17–0 defeat at home to Lostock Hall. In the aftermath of the Haydock defeat, the club started a winding-up procedure, did not seek re-election to the Alliance, and merged with Farnworth Standard, which, like Kearsley, was in a significant amount of debt, a previous merger attempt at the start of the season having fallen through; the new club was called Farnworth F.C. and played at the Kearsley ground. The merger however did not succeed, and by the end of 1895 Farnworth wound up and resigned from the Alliance.

== Colours ==
The club played in red shirts.

== Ground ==
The club's original ground was alongside the Lark Hill running track. In 1885, when excavation work was taking place next to the ground, a body was discovered, estimated to have been buried 20 years before, and assessed as a murder victim, as the skull had a severe wound.

The club was also reported as playing at Higher Market Street in Farnworth, which was used for the Farnworth Football Club, and this may have been the same ground as the south end of the street reached Lark Hill. The highest recorded attendance for the club was 4,000, for the derby with Farnworth Standard in the Alliance on 9 April 1892.

== Notable players ==
- William Smith, full-back, who played for the club in 1891–92, leaving for Blackburn Rovers at the end of the season.
