= Horwich F.C. =

- Full name: Horwich Football Club
- Nickname: the Railwaymen
- Founded: 1881
- Dissolved: 1900
- Ground: Old Racecourse Ground
- Secretary: W. J. Whiteley
Original club colours	Merged club colours

Horwich F.C. was an association football club from Horwich, Lancashire, active in the 1890s.

== History ==
=== Original Horwich ===
The original Horwich F.C. club is first noted from the 1881–82 season. It played one tie in the Lancashire Senior Cup, in 1884–85, which ended in a 3–1 loss at Southport; afterwards the Lancashire Junior Cup was created for the non-professional sides such as Horwich.

=== Horwich L&Y ===
In 1887, the cricket side of the Horwich railway works formed its own football club, known as Horwich L&Y or Horwich L&YR F.C. (standing for Lancashire and Yorkshire Railway). Horwich L&Y was the more prominent of the two sides, and in 1891 it joined the Lancashire Alliance, although it finished the 1891–92 season in next to last place.

=== Merger ===
In April 1892 the Horwich and L&Y cricket and football clubs merged, "to secure for the township a really first-class club". The combine retained the name Horwich, but kept the L&Y's Alliance place, and moved to a ground provided by the railway company.

Horwich remained an Alliance member until the 1896–97 season, generally finishing in mid-table. It did however score some remarkable victories, including a then record-setting 17–0 win over Leigh Association (for which only four Leigh regulars turned up) and a 14–0 win over Golborne in 1893–94.

In 1897 the club was one of the five clubs elected to the Lancashire League, out of 14 applicants, but it did not find the going easier - it was bottom of the table in 1897–98 (albeit after three other clubs left), was two off the bottom in 1898–99, and one off the bottom in 1899–1900.

It was however now able to enter the FA Cup, and reached the third qualifying round in 1897–98, edged 3–2 by Chorley at that stage; Chorley were three goals to the good after half-an-hour but Horwich nearly pulled it back. Horwich also re-entered the Lancashire Senior Cup in 1897–98 and 1898–99, but lost in the qualifying round both times.

The club converted into a limited liability company in 1898, but the club's financial situation deteriorated - in 1898–99 the club lost over £50 over the season, not helped by the club's pavilion being wrecked in a storm in January, and in June 1900 the shareholders resolved to wind up the club; the blame was put on "the exodus of footballers to other towns". The club's effects were sold in November 1900, raising just short of the £52 the club owed for rent, goalposts and nets fetching £25 (as against a purchase cost of £100 higher) and the grandstand a mere £7 as timber. The company was formally removed from the register in 1902.

== Colours ==
The original club wore red and white halved shirts. Horwich L&Y probably shared the same colours as Newton Heath L&Y F.C., namely amber and green halves (being the railway company's livery colours),, as the merged club wore green, amber, and red shirts, mixing the Horwich red with the railway colours.

== Ground ==
The Horwich club had a nomadic existence in its first seasons, repeatedly having to move ground because of building works, before settling at the Chorley New Road ground in 1889, which was also used by the L&Y side. In 1892 the club moved to a new ground marked out at the Recreation Ground, and in 1894 to the Old Racecourse Ground. The highest recorded crowd was 6,000 for the home FA Cup tie with Chorley in 1897.

== Notable players ==
- Billy Morgan, whom the club sold to Newton Heath in 1898
- Notable players ( 3 )
