= Golborne F.C. =

Association football club (1881–1896)

- Founded: 1881
- Dissolved: 1896
- Ground: Recreation Ground
- Secretary: 1881: F. J. K. Williamson; 1882–85: Thomas Berwick; 1889–90: T. Ridyard; 1895: J. G. Lee
Home colours

Golborne Football Club was an association football club from the town of Golborne, Lancashire, active in the 19th century.

== History ==
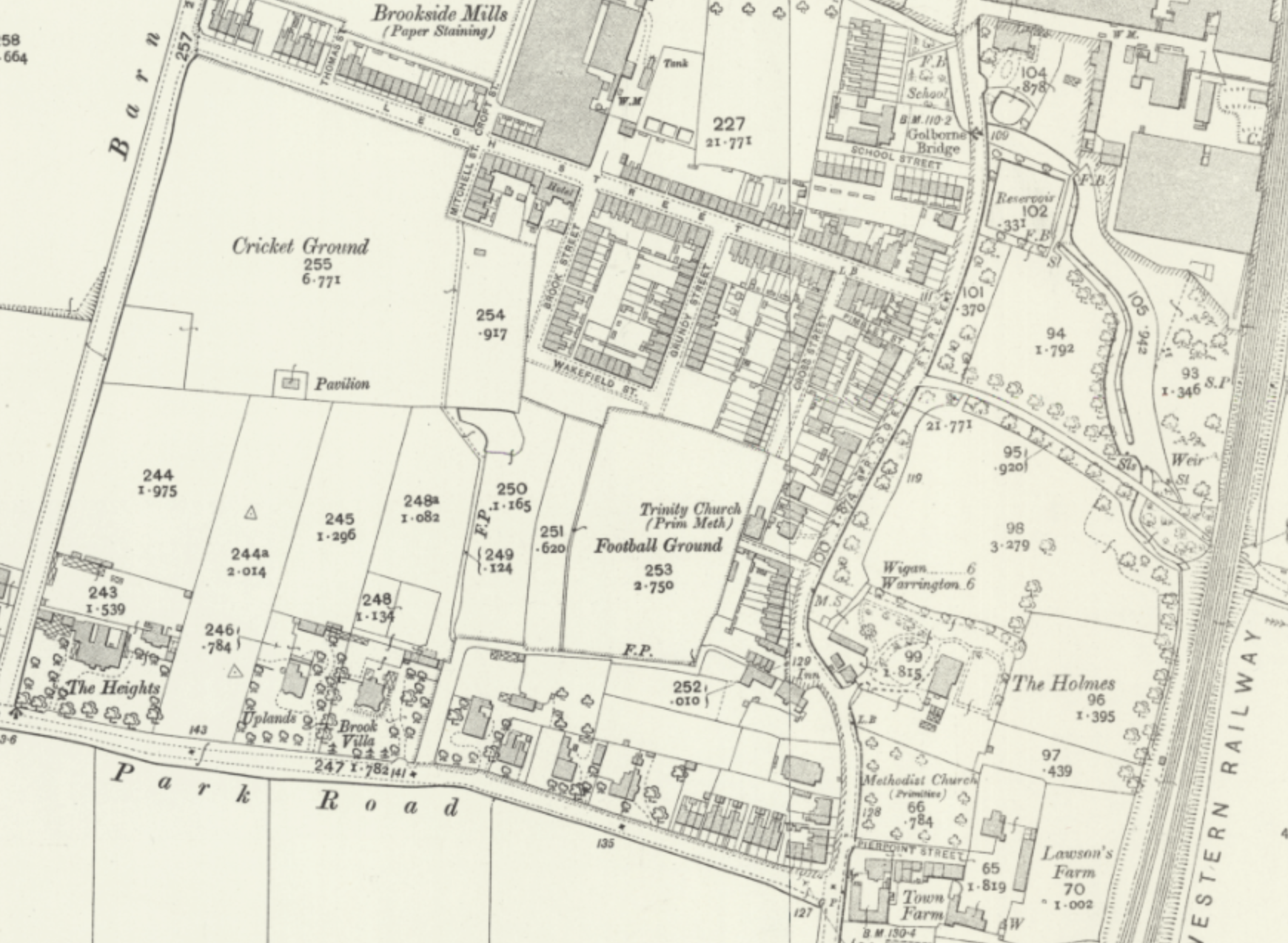
Location of Golborne Football Ground and Cricket Ground, Lancashire CI.12 Ordnance Survey map, 1893

The club was formed in 1881 by Thomas Berwick, a Liverpool-born calico salesman, and won 7 of its 12 matches in its first season. It entered the Lancashire Senior Cup in 1883–84 and 1884–85, reaching the third round in the latter year, where it lost to Low Moor. At the start of the latter season, the club lost the services of one of its younger players, W. Laybourne, who lost a leg in a colliery accident.

The club's biggest competitive victory came in the 1885–86 Wigan Association Challenge Cup first round, when the side beat Brynn Ramblers 15–0. The same season, the club was suspended by the Liverpool and District Football Association for "riotous behaviour" in a Liverpool District Cup tie at home to Stanley; the home crowd broke through the pitchside ropes after Stanley's Culkin kicked Golborne's Clough in the face. The tie was abandoned, with Stanley 4–1 up, and the Golborne committee escorted the Stanley players away from the station where a crowd was waiting.

The club first turned a profit (of 16 shillings and sixpence) after the 1887–88 season, but the club suffered further disciplinary trouble in 1890, when secretary Ridyard and player Cooke were suspended for misleading the Lancashire Football Association over Cooke's playing for the club. Worse, following a series of protests and counter-protests in relation to Golborne's win in the Wigan & District Cup semi-final against Ashton-in-Makerfield in 1891, the Cup committee lost patience and expelled both teams from the competition, making Ashton Association - who had won the other semi-final - winner by default.

Nevertheless, Golborne joined the Lancashire Alliance in 1891–92, although it struggled near the foot of the table for five years, before disbanding just after the start of the 1896–97 season.

=== Player death ===
In January 1893, a Golborne player, the 22-year-old William Knowles, also known as William Lee, a side-piercer from Bolton, died suddenly, the coroner recording that it was caused by "injuries"; it was reported that he had "suffered some ugly falls" in recent matches.

== Colours ==
The club wore white shirts and blue knickers.

== Ground ==
The club's first ground was at Legh Street. In October 1882 the club moved to a new ground at Golborne railway station, and in 1885 to a new ground owned by a newly-constituted company, the Golborne Recreation Company, known as the May Queen Field, off Bridge Street.
