= William A. Smith (footballer) =

English footballer

William Smith
Personal information
- Full name: William A. Smith
- Place of birth: Blackburn, England
- Position: Full-back

Senior career*
Years	Team	Apps	(Gls)
1891–1892	Kearsley		
1892–1893	Blackburn Rovers	1	(0)
Total		1	(0)
- * Club domestic league appearances and goals

William A. Smith was an English footballer who played in the Football League for Blackburn Rovers. Smith's only appearance for Blackburn came in a 2–2 draw away at Stoke on 3 April 1893.
