= Ashton-in-Makerfield F.C. =

Association football club active in the 1890s

- Full name: Ashton-in-Makerfield Football Club
- Nickname: the Pikeites
- Founded: 1887
- Dissolved: 1899
- Ground: Recreation Ground
- Chairman: Richard Latham (1888), J. Winstanley (1889)
- Secretary: T. H. Davis
colours

Ashton-in-Makerfield F.C. was an association football club from Ashton-in-Makerfield, Lancashire, active in the 1890s.

== History ==
The club was founded in 1887, as a winter activity for a cricket club. The club enjoyed patronage from the local Member of Parliament T. W. Legh, and gained its first successes in winning the Liverpool and District League in 1889–90 and 1890–91.

After the latter triumph was elected to the Lancashire Alliance, and it remained a member until 1898–99. It reached the semi-final of the Lancashire Junior Cup in 1892–93, going down 4–2 at eventual winner Clitheroe, despite 500 of the 2,000 crowd being Ashton supporters conveyed on a special train. The same season the club recorded its record victory, a 12–2 hammering of Adlington in the Alliance in February.

Its best season Alliance season was a runner-up finish in 1895–96, albeit 7 points behind champion Earlestown. The club led the table until February, and even fielded a reserve side in the Junior Cup to focus on the Alliance.

Although the club received a significant benefit in 1897 by taking on a number of players from Park Lane Wanderers, which had folded in the summer due to lack of support, the 1897–98 season was the club's final full season. It started the 1898–99 season, but did not complete it; as at January 1899 the club had played 8 fixtures, when all of the other sides were in double figures - three wins and four defeats had the club in 9th out of 12. It failed to turn up to the away fixture with Astley Bridge Wanderers on 14 January, resulting in the Alliance suspending the club sine die - a suspension which was never lifted. A new club - Ashton Town - was formed four years later.

== Colours ==
The club wore chocolate and blue stripes.

== Ground ==
The club played at the Recreation Ground, at the end of Council Avenue, to the west of Bryn Street, and north of the Liverpool Road.
