= Newtown St Mark's A.F.C. =

Defunct association football club

Newtown St Mark's F.C.
- Full name: Newtown St Mark's Football Club
- Nickname: the Saints
- Founded: 1894
- Dissolved: 1907
- Ground: Victory Park
- Secretary: J. E. Telford
Home colours

Newtown St Mark's A.F.C. was an association football club from Wigan, Lancashire, active in the early 20th century.

== History ==
The club was formed of old boys from Newton St Mark's school, and the earliest reference to the club is of it seeking fixtures for the 1894–95 season; it joined the Wigan Junior League that season, but struggled at the bottom of the table.

For the 1901–02 season, under the shorter name Newtown, the club joined the Lancashire Football Association and was elected to the Lancashire Alliance; the media, having to catch up, occasionally referred to the club as "Newtown St Mark's", unsurprising given that the club retained a number of the St Mark's players from the previous years, including goalkeeper Calderbank, full-back P. Barker, midfielders J. Barker and captain T. Brown, and forwards Irvine, Birchall, and Hewitt. However the club struggled at this higher level, and finished bottom but one, with 4 wins in 20 games.

The club appears to have gone into abeyance until 1903, and re-joined the Lancashire Alliance in July 1904; by the time the season started, it had added the St Mark's back into its name. It finished a promising 5th (out of 14 clubs) in its first season back, but diminishing returns set in, and after dropping to 9th and 11th in its next two seasons, it dropped to the Wigan and District League for 1906–07, and the club's sole achievement of any note came that season, namely reaching the Wigan Charity Cup Final. In front of 1,000 spectators at Ince the club was easily beaten 5–0 by Atherton Church House reserves.

The club dissolved in the summer of 1907 due to lack of support - it was generating gate income of £19 against expenses of £63, but on final dissolution, the club had a balance of £2 15/-, which the club committee donated to the Wigan Infirmary.

Other clubs with the same name continued afterwards, including an amateur side until 1919, and a schoolboy side after the First World War.

== Colours ==
The club's colours were blue, in the form of Oxford and Cambridge blue shirts.

== Ground ==
The club played at Victory Park on Warrington Road, later used by Wigan Rovers; its headquarters were at the Black Horse Inn.
