= Adlington F.C. =

Association football club active before World War 1

- Full name: Adlington Football Club
- Nickname: the Pikemen
- Founded: 1878
- Dissolved: 1916
- Ground: Railway Road
- President: Dr W. C. Rigby
- Secretary: I. Jackson
Home colours

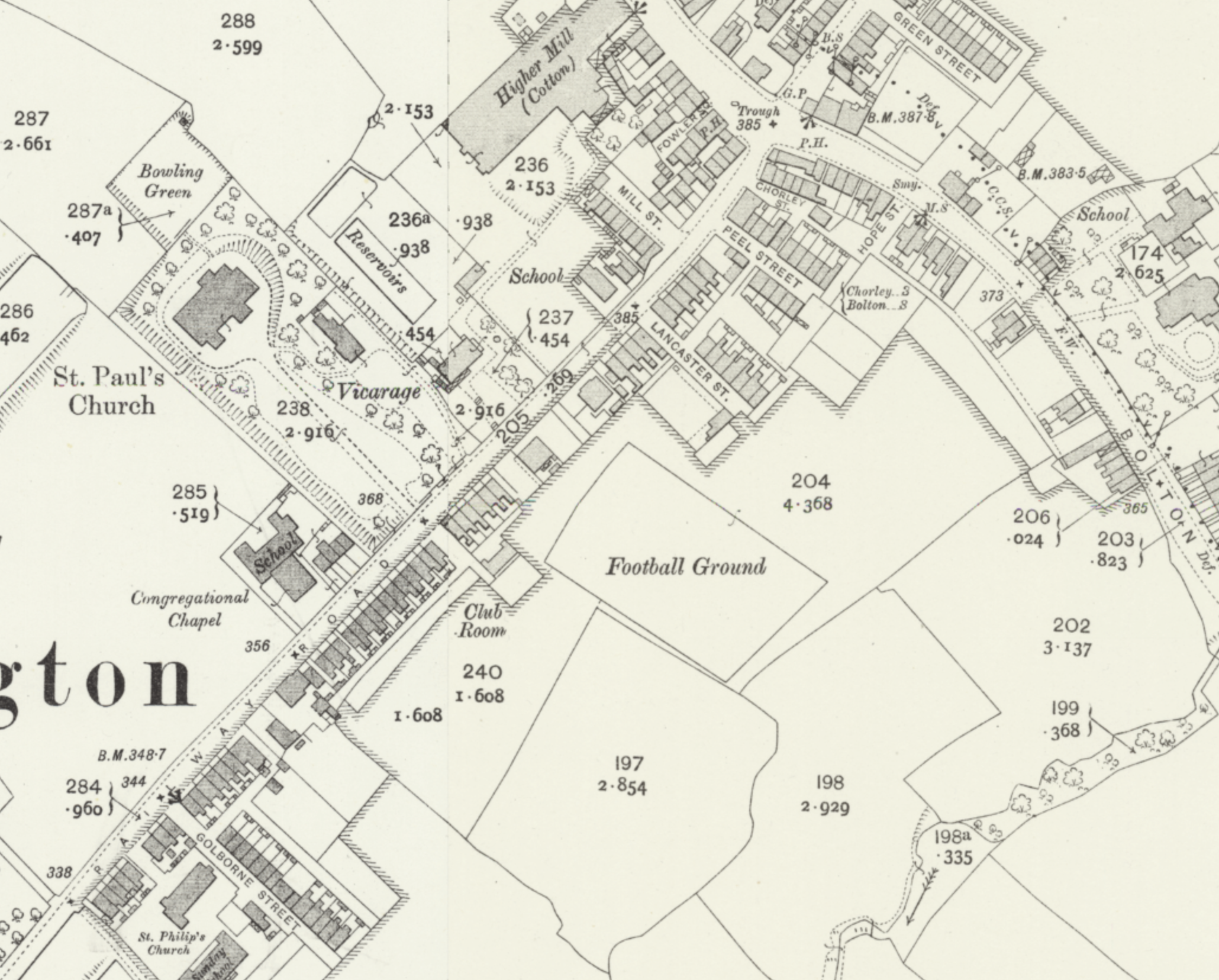
Adlington F.C.'s Railway Road ground, Ordnance Survey Lancashire LXXXVI.1, 1908

Adlington F.C. was an association football club from Adlington, Lancashire, active in the years before the First World War.

== History ==
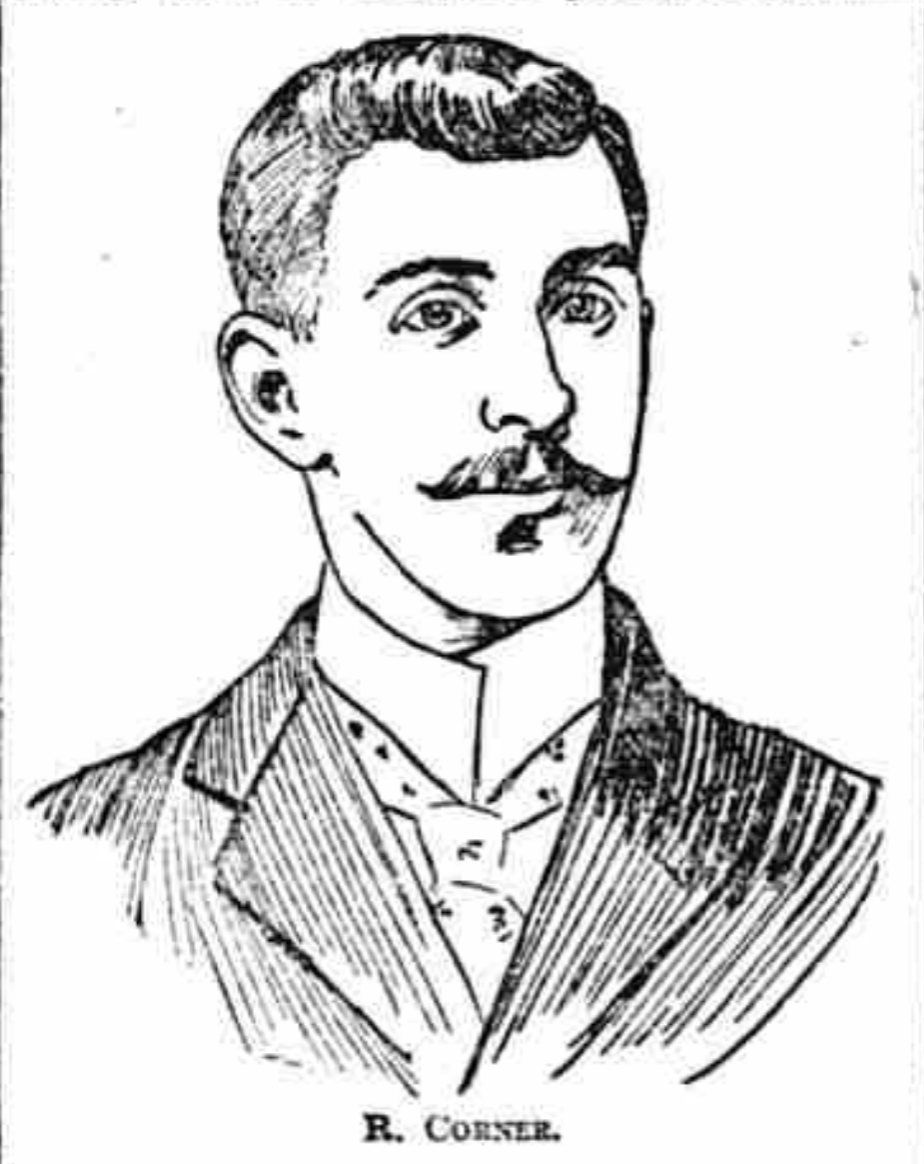
Bob Corner, full-back who captained Adlington to the Lancashire Alliance title in 1903–04, Lancashire Evening Post, 9 April 1904

The club claimed an unlikely foundation date of 1868, but that seems to refer to the cricket club from which the football club was formed; the first reference to a football side is from 1878.

Its first appearance of note was entering the Lancashire Senior Cup in 1882–83; in the first round, it was drawn to visit Blackburn Park Road, and the Roadsters cruised to a 16–1 victory. It entered the competition for the next two seasons, losing in the first round both times, before the Lancashire Junior Cup was set up for the non-professional clubs, and that became the focus of the club's attentions.

In 1889–90, Adlington was a founder member of the Lancashire Alliance , under the competition's original name of the Lancashire Junior League (which was changed after one season). The club struggled throughout the 1890s, finishing bottom of the table three times; although the Alliance suffered the loss of over half its teams following the 1898–99 season, and again after the 1902–03 season, Adlington remained loyal to the Alliance. It played in the competition every season until 1901–02, when the club only took part in the Wigan Cup, and was effectively folded into the grammar school-based team Adlington Crashers, which took on the Adlington mantle and re-joined the Alliance.

Adlington won the Alliance championship twice, in 1903–04 (when the competition only had 7 members) and 1908–09, although in the latter season there was disappointment in losing the final of the Wigan Cup 1–0 to Earlestown St John's, the club stymied by losing full-back Arthur Shepherd early in the game to a broken leg. Adlington came one point short of a chance of retaining the title in 1909–10; if teams finished level at the top of the table, there would be a play-off for the championship, and, had the record of Standish North End - which had disbanded partway through the season - been expunged, Adlington and Chorley Reserves would have finished level. However, after Adlington appealed to the Alliance, the committee decided there was no power to remove Standish from the standings, and Adlington was left a point behind Chorley.

In part because of the club's appeal being dismissed, Adlington decided to join the West Lancashire League in 1910. The club's run in the West Lancashire League was successful, the club being at the sharp end of the table for its four seasons of membership, culminating in a runner-up spot, behind Leyland, in 1914–15. The confidence of the club was such that it entered the FA Cup for the first time, winning through two qualifying rounds before being eliminated by Haslingden St Mary's. In 1911–12 the club also won the Richardson Cup for local sides, beating Horwich in a final replay at Chorley.

At the end of the 1914–15 season, the club resolved to join the Lancashire Combination, which, due to the war, was played in two separate geographical divisions over the remainder of the 1915 calendar year, with a subsidiary competition between the same clubs starting in 1916. However, Adlington was not able to complete its fixtures in 1915, finishing the year by granting walkovers and finishing bottom with 1 win, 1 draw, and 16 defeats. With little home support it originally agreed to play all of its 1916 fixtures away from home, but after its New Year's Day match at Rossendale was abandoned due to the weather after 20 minutes, with Adlington already 3–0 down, the club withdrew from the subsidiary competition and never re-emerged. The name was later used by the Adlington Parish Church side which played in the West Lancashire League in 1920–21.

== Colours ==
The earliest record for the club's colours are from 1889, at which time it wore chocolate and white. By 1904 the club was wearing red and blue. By 1912 it was wearing red shirts.

== Ground ==
The club's ground was at the corner of Railway Road and Lancaster Street, and known as the Railway Road Ground.

== Nickname ==
The club's nickname of the Pikemen derived from the village being within the Pike District, an informal name for the area near Rivington Pike.

== Notable players ==
- John Slater, who played for the club in 1905, aged 16, before joining Bolton Wanderers, and later becoming a Member of Parliament.
