= Joe Haywood =

English soccer & rugby league footballer

Personal information
- Full name: Joseph Henry Haywood
- Date of birth: April 1893
- Place of birth: Wednesbury, Staffordshire, England
- Date of death: 1976 (aged 82–83)
- Position: Wing half

Senior career*
Years	Team	Apps	(Gls)
?–1913	Hindley Central		
1913–1919	Manchester United	26	(0)
- Rugby league career
Playing information
- Position: Wing
Club
Years	Team	Pld	T	G	FG	P
1919–20	Warrington	22	3	0	0	9
1920–≥20	Widnes
	Total	22	3	0	0	9
- * Club domestic league appearances and goals

Joseph Henry Haywood (born April 1893) was an English association football footballer who played as a wing half, and a rugby league footballer who played as a wing. Born in Wednesbury, Staffordshire (now West Midlands), he played for Hindley Central and Manchester United. He joined Manchester United as a back-up half-back in May 1913 for a fee of £50. In his first season with the club, he made 14 appearances on both the left and right sides of the half-back trio. In 1914–15, he did not make an appearance until 6 February 1915, but ended the season with 12 appearances, again split between the right- and left-half positions. His career was cut short by the outbreak of the First World War, and he left Manchester United at the end of the 1918–19 season, by which time he had begun playing rugby league football and Manchester United were asking for £20 to transfer his registration. He played club level rugby league for Warrington and Widnes, as a wing. He made his debut for Warrington on 6 September 1919, and he played his last match for Warrington on 24 April 1920.
