= Richard Iddon =

English footballer

Richard Iddon (22 June 1901 – 26 February 1975) was an English footballer. His regular position was as a forward. He was born in Tarleton, Lancashire. He played for Manchester United, Tarleton, Preston North End, Leyland, and Chorley.
