= Walkden Central F.C. =

Defunct association football club in England

- Full name: Walkden Central Football Club
- Founded: 1902
- Dissolved: 1918
- Ground: Hill Top
- Chairman: J. H. Sherlock
- Secretary: Moses Partington
Home colours

Walkden Central F.C. was an association football club from Walkden, Lancashire, active in the early 20th century.

== History ==
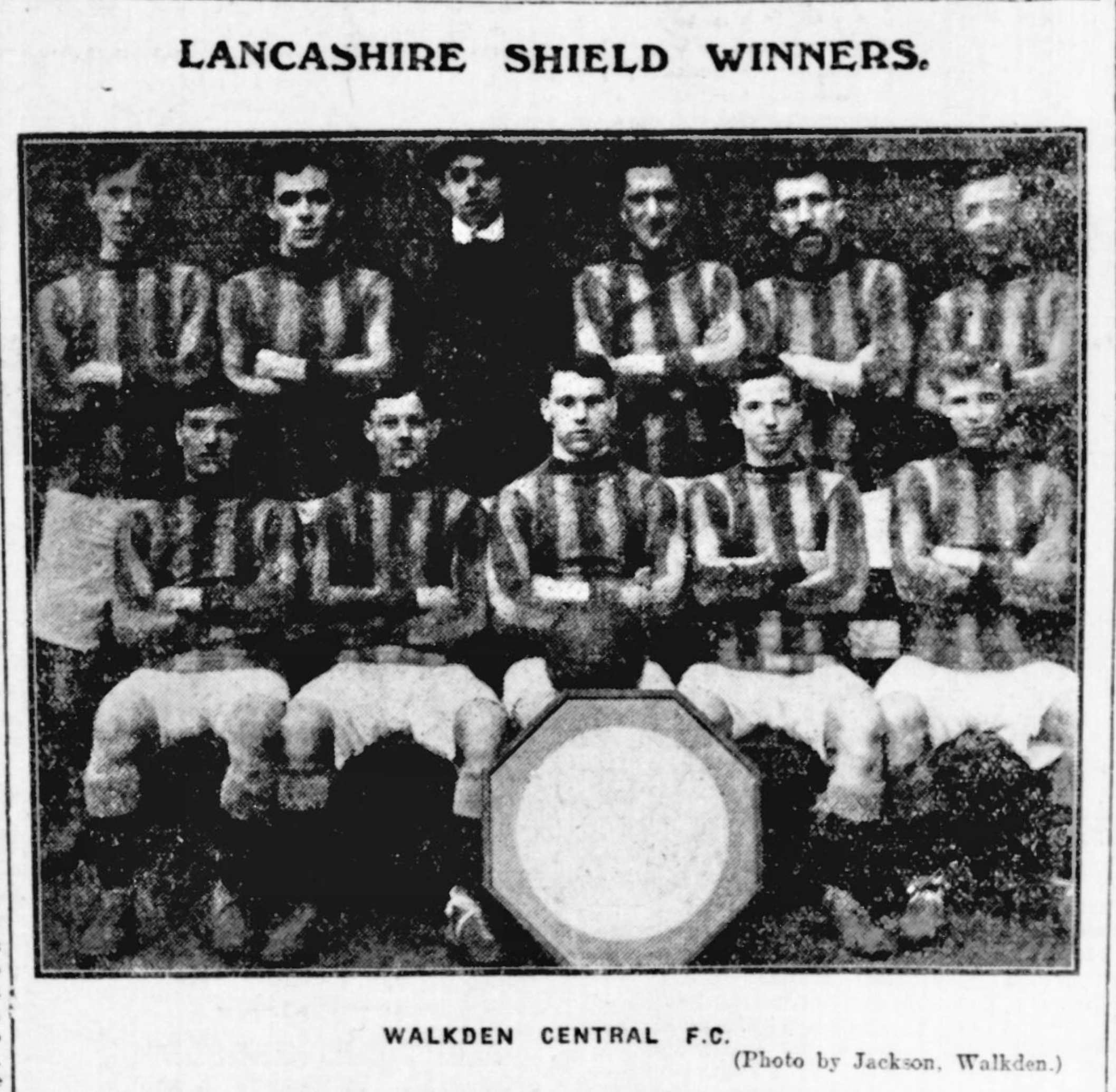
Walkden Central F.C., with the Lancashire Shield, Farnworth Chronicle, 23 January 1909

The first reference to the club is as a member of the Eccles & District League in 1902–03. The following season it was in the Swinton & District League, and in 1904 joined the Lancashire Alliance.

Its first season in the Alliance was its best. Walkden finished the 1904–05 season level on points with Leyland at the top of the league. Leyland had the better goal average, but, as that was not used as a tie-breaker, the sides played off for the championship at Farnworth, Central having won the toss for choice of ground. Central came back from 3–0 and 4–2 down to draw 4–4, but Leyland refused to play extra-time, on account of a number of players being injured; at first it was agreed to share the trophy and championship flag, each club to hold the spoils for six months. However, at a meeting later in May, the Alliance committee resolved that Walkden would be awarded the title, due to Leyland refusing to play extra-time.

The club joined the Lancashire Combination from the 1908–09 season (its reserve side remaining in the Alliance for 1909–10), starting in the second division, and after the 1910–11 season was one of the 11 sides which were promoted after a reorganization. As a Combination member, it was entitled to enter the FA Cup qualifying rounds, but in its five entries never made it beyond the second qualifying round.

By 1913, the club was in deep financial difficulties, due to a lack of support and the reserves proving to be a financial drain, and it nearly disbanded before the 1913–14 season. It was relegated after a bottom-place finish in 1913–14, and after finishing 8th of 13 in the second division in 1914–15 (with 8 of its players joining the armed forces before the season), it was put into the southern section of the wartime Combination.

The club played in the Combination until the 1916–17 season and a reserve side continued into 1917. The club had a notional existence until 1918, but it did not re-emerge after the war.

== Colours ==
The earliest record of the club's shirts are that they were striped, probably in amber and black. By 1913, the club's colours were red and white.

== Ground ==
The club played at Hill Top, off Harris Street, notorious for its slope.

== Notable players ==
- Notable players ( 6 )
