= Skerton F.C. =

Association football club active in the late 19th century

- Full name: Skerton Football Club
- Nicknames: the Lunesiders, the Red and Blacks
- Founded: 1888
- Dissolved: 1900
- Ground: Lune Road
- President: Councillor Turney (1889–94), Councillor Gladstone (1897)
- Secretary: J. Pye (1889), A. Ireland (1894)
colours

Skerton Football Club was an association football club from Lancaster, Lancashire, active in the 19th century.

== History ==
The earliest references to the club are from the 1888–89 season. It took a more serious turn in 1891, when it decided to appoint a trainer for the first time, Councillor Smith agreeing to defray the expense. In 1892 the club joined the Lancashire Alliance for its first experience of league football.

After a successful 1896–97 season, in which the club won more matches than ever before (27 out of 35), and won the Alliance title for the first (and only) time, the club joined the Lancashire Combination for the 1897–98 season (having failed to gain admission to the higher profile Lancashire League), and, to raise money for the extra expenses, was floated as a limited company. The club then enjoyed two mid-table finishes, and won the Lancashire Junior Cup in both of those seasons. The Skertonians had twice been runner-up before reaching the 1897–98 final, and the Skertonians had trained especially at Lytham St Annes for the match, against St Helens Recs at Deepdale; goals from Blatchford and Fryers in the first half, and Blatchford scoring his second with a shot in-off the crossbar in the second, saw the club lift the trophy for the first time. The same two clubs contested the final at the same venue in 1898–99, Skerton winning 2–0, and it proved more attractive than the Lancashire Senior Cup final the following week - fewer than 4,000 turned up to Burnden Park for the latter, but there was a 50% higher gate for the Junior.

However, the club's fortunes took a turn for the worse in 1899; the cost of erection of a new grandstand proved crippling. In March 1900, having only registered 1 win in 22 Combination games, and with debts of £150 (a third of which was due to the grandstand), it resigned from the Combination, its record was expunged, and the club dissolved.

== Colours ==
The club traditionally wore red and black. This caused an incident with Lytham in 1892, in which both clubs wore the same coloured kits. By 1897–98 it was wearing red jerseys.

== Ground ==
The club's original ground was on Morecambe Lane. It moved to Lune Road by 1895.
