= Lancashire Combination =

Football competition in the north-west of England

The Lancashire Combination was a football league founded in the North West of England in 1891–92. It absorbed the Lancashire League in 1903. In 1968 the Combination lost five of its clubs to the newly formed Northern Premier League. In 1982 it was finally merged with the Cheshire County League to form the North West Counties League.

== Champions ==
Season	Champions
1891–92	Blackburn Rovers reserves
1892–93	Blackburn Rovers reserves
1893–94	Blackburn Rovers reserves
1894–95	Everton reserves
1895–96	Preston North End reserves
1896–97	Liverpool reserves
1897–98	Preston North End reserves
1898–99	Preston North End reserves
1899–1900	Liverpool reserves
1900–01	Everton reserves
1901–02	Manchester City reserves
1902–03	Accrington Stanley

Season	Division One champions	Division Two champions
1903–04	Everton reserves	Southport Central
1904–05	Stockport County	St Helens Recreation
1905–06	Accrington Stanley	Colne
1906–07	Oldham Athletic	Carlisle United
1907–08	Everton reserves	Blackburn Rovers reserves
1908–09	Everton reserves	Manchester City reserves
1909–10	Everton reserves	Glossop North End reserves
1910–11	Rochdale	Haslingden
1911–12	Rochdale	Stalybridge Celtic
1912–13	Eccles Borough	South Liverpool
1913–14	Tranmere Rovers	Witton Albion
1914–15	Eccles Borough	Rochdale
	Northern Section	Southern Section
1915–16	Accrington Stanley	South Liverpool
	First Competition	Second Competition
1916–17	Hurst	Tranmere Rovers
1917–18	South Liverpool	
	Liverpool Section	Manchester Section
1918–19	Tranmere Rovers	Stalybridge Celtic

Season	Champions
1919–20	Chorley
1920–21	Barrow
1921–22	Lancaster Town
1922–23	Chorley
1923–24	Fleetwood
1924–25	Morecambe
1925–26	Nelson reserves
1926–27	Rossendale United
1927–28	Chorley
1928–29	Chorley
1929–30	Lancaster Town
1930–31	Darwen
1931–32	Darwen
1932–33	Chorley
1933–34	Chorley
1934–35	Lancaster Town
1935–36	Lancaster Town
1936–37	South Liverpool
1937–38	South Liverpool
1938–39	South Liverpool
1945–46	Chorley
1946–47	Bacup Borough

Season	Division One champions	Division Two champions
1947–48	Wigan Athletic	Stubshaw Cross Rovers
1948–49	Netherfield	Bootle
1949–50	Nelson	Blackpool "B"
1950–51	Wigan Athletic	St Helens Town
1951–52	Nelson	Prescot Cables
1952–53	Wigan Athletic	Bolton Wanderers "B"
1953–54	Wigan Athletic	Burscough
1954–55	Accrington Stanley reserves	Burnley 'A'
1955–56	Burscough	Skelmersdale United
1956–57	Prescot Cables	Rossendale United
1957–58	Horwich RMI	Oldham Athletic reserves
1958–59	New Brighton	Netherfield reserves
1959–60	Chorley	Clitheroe
1960–61	Chorley	Chorley reserves
1961–62	Morecambe	Ashton United
1962–63	Morecambe	Crompton Recreation
1963–64	Chorley	Accrington Stanley
1964–65	Netherfield	Netherfield reserves
1965–66	South Liverpool	Wigan Rovers
1966–67	Morecambe	Kirkby Town
1967–68	Morecambe	Oldham Athletic reserves

Season	Champions
1968–69	Great Harwood
1969–70	Burscough
1970–71	Prestwich Heys
1971–72	St Helens Town
1972–73	Darwen
1973–74	Accrington Stanley
1974–75	Darwen
1975–76	Bootle
1976–77	Bootle
1977–78	Accrington Stanley
1978–79	Wren Rovers
1979–80	Clitheroe
1980–81	Wren Rovers
1981–82	Caernarfon Town

== Member clubs ==
The following clubs and reserve teams played in the Lancashire Combination:

- Accrington
- Accrington Stanley (modern)
- Accrington Stanley (original)
- Accrington Stanley reserves
- ACI Horwich
- Adlington
- Altrincham
- Ashton Athletic
- Ashton Town (1903)
- Ashton Town (1953)
- Ashton United
- Astley & Tyldesley Collieries
- Astley Bridge
- Astley Bridge Wanderers
- Atherton
- Atherton Collieries
- Bacup Borough
- Bacup Borough reserves
- Bangor City
- Barnoldswick & District
- Barnoldswick Town
- Barnoldswick United
- Barrow
- Barrow reserves
- Bell's Temperance
- Berry's Association
- Black Lane Temperance
- Blackburn Park Road
- Blackburn Rovers reserves
- Blackburn Rovers 'A'
- Blackpool 'B'
- Blackpool Mechanics
- Blackpool reserves
- Bolton ST
- Bolton St Luke's
- Bolton Wanderers 'B'
- Bolton Wanderers reserves
- Bootle
- Bootle Athletic
- Brynn Central
- Burnley 'A'
- Burnley reserves
- Burscough
- Burscough Rangers
- Burscough reserves
- Bury reserves
- Caernarfon Town
- Carlisle United
- Chadderton
- Chester
- Chorley
- Chorley reserves
- Chorley St George's
- Clitheroe
- Clitheroe Central
- Colne
- Colne Dynamoes
- Colne Town
- Crewe Alexandra reserves
- Cromptons Recreation
- Daisy Hill
- Darwen
- Darwen reserves
- De Havilland
- Denton
- Dick, Kerr's
- Droylsden
- Droylsden United
- Dukinfield Town
- Earlestown (1880–1911)
- Earlestown (1945–63)
- Eccles United
- Ellesmere Port Town
- Everton reserves
- Failsworth
- Fleetwood
- Fleetwood Rangers
- Fleetwood reserves
- Ford Motors
- Formby
- Glossop North End
- Glossop North End reserves
- Great Harwood
- Great Harwood reserves
- Great Harwood Town
- Guinness Exports
- Halliwell
- Haslingden
- Hebden Bridge
- Heywood
- Heywood United
- Hindley
- Hindley Central
- Hindley Green Athletic
- Hindsford
- Horwich RMI
- Horwich RMI reserves
- Hurst Ramblers
- Hyde
- Hyde St George's
- Kirkby Town
- Kirkby Town reserves
- Lancaster City
- Lancaster City reserves
- Leyland
- Leyland Motors
- Little Lever
- Liverpool reserves
- Liverpool Stanley
- Lomax
- Lomond
- Lostock Hall
- Lucas Sports
- Lytham
- Macclesfield
- Maghull
- Manchester Central
- Manchester City reserves
- Manchester North End
- Manchester Polytechnic
- Manchester United reserves
- Marine
- Milnthorpe Corinthians
- Morecambe
- Morecambe reserves
- Nantwich
- Nelson
- Nelson reserves
- Netherfield
- Netherfield reserves
- New Brighton
- New Brighton reserves
- New Brighton Tower reserves
- Newton Heath Athletic
- Newton-le-Willows
- North Meols
- Northern Nomads
- Northwich Victoria
- Oldham Athletic
- Oldham Athletic reserves
- Oldham Athletic 'A'
- Oldham Dew
- Oswaldtwistle Rovers
- Oswestry United
- Padiham (original)
- Padiham (revival)
- Pendlebury
- Plank Lane
- Portsmouth Rovers
- Port Sunlight
- Prescot Cables
- Prescot Cables reserves
- Prescot
- Preston North End 'A'
- Preston North End reserves
- Prestwich Heys
- Radcliffe Borough
- Rawtenstall
- Rochdale (1896)
- Rochdale (1907)
- Rochdale reserves
- Rochdale Town
- Rolls Royce
- Rossendale United
- Rossendale United reserves
- Royton
- St Anne's Athletic
- St Helens Recreation
- St Helens Town
- Skerton
- Skelmersdale United
- Skelmersdale United reserves
- South Liverpool (1890s)
- South Liverpool
- Southport Central
- Southport reserves
- Stalybridge Celtic
- Stalybridge Celtic reserves
- Stalybridge Rovers
- Stockport County reserves
- Stubshaw Cross Rovers
- Tonge
- Tranmere Rovers
- Tranmere Rovers reserves
- Turton
- Tyldesley Albion
- Vulcan Institute
- Vulcan Newton
- Walkden Central
- Whitworth Valley
- Wigan Athletic
- Wigan Athletic reserves
- Wigan Borough
- Wigan Borough reserves
- Wigan Rovers
- Wigan Town
- Witton Albion
- Workington
- Wren Rovers

In 1894, the competition took over the North East Lancashire League. One of the clubs admitted as a result, Brierfield, withdrew before the season started.
