= Fred Valentine (footballer, born 1880) =

English footballer

Personal information
- Full name: Frederick Valentine
- Date of birth: 1880
- Place of birth: Lancashire, England
- Position: Outside forward

Senior career*
Years	Team	Apps	(Gls)
19xx–1907	Earlestown		
1907–1910	Burnley	18	(3)
1910–19xx	Accrington Stanley		
- * Club domestic league appearances and goals

Frederick Valentine (born 1880, date of death unknown) was an English professional footballer who played as an outside forward.
