= Brynn Central F.C. =

Defunct English football club

Brynn Central
- Full name: Brynn Central Football Club
- Nickname: the Brynnites
- Founded: 1900
- Dissolved: 1908
- Ground: Central Ground
Home colours

Brynn Central F.C. was an association football club from the village of Bryn, near Wigan, Lancashire, active in the early twentieth century. The football club's name had a different spelling to that of the village.

== History ==
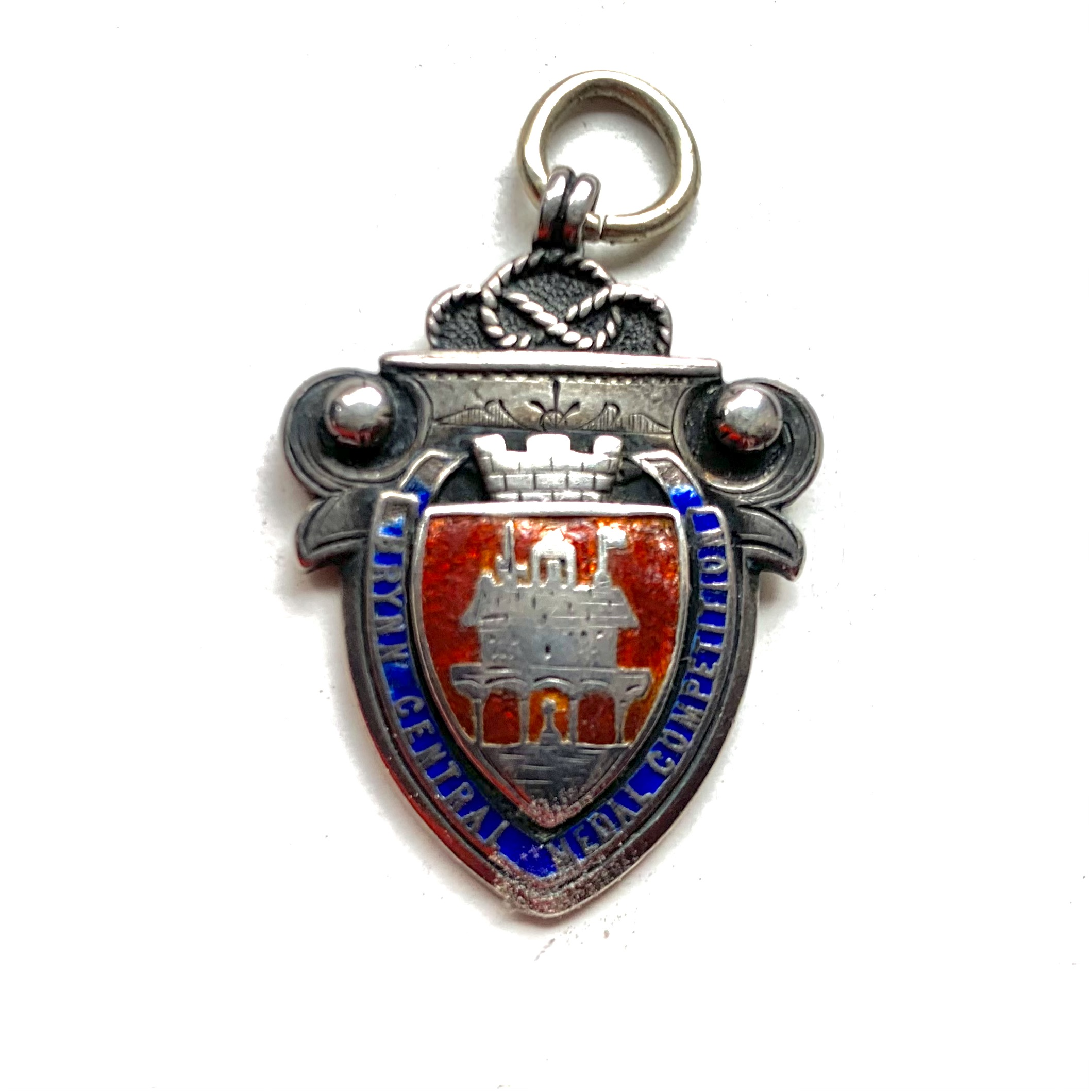
Brynn Central F.C. competition medal, 1905–06 season

The earliest references to the club are from the 1900–01 season, when it joined the Lancashire Alliance. It finished bottom but one in its first season, but in 1902–03 was runner-up. It also won the Wigan Cup with a 3–1 win over Atherton Church House.

The club joined the second division of the Lancashire Combination in 1903–04, and remained in the competition for five seasons, finishing between 5th and 14th in a competition that contained between 18 and 20 clubs over the piece. It also entered the FA Cup over the same period but only twice reached the second qualifying round. As a second division side, it did not enter the Lancashire Senior Cup, competing in the Junior Cup instead, but without success.

The club's committee decided to convert the club into a limited liability company before the 1907–08 season, However, at the end of 1908, the club was forced to disband because of a lack of financial support, with its league fixtures being taken over by Great Harwood. The club's final match, at home to Glossop reserves on Christmas day, summed up the straits in which it had found itself; the gate was a mere £2, the start was delayed by half-an-hour as the Brynn kit had been lost, the XI the club fielded was a "scratch" side of its remaining reserves, plus half-back Aspinall who was forced to play in goal, and the visitors won 8–0. The club had taken only 1 point from its 12 league games.

== Colours ==
The club wore red and white stripes.

== Ground ==
The club's ground was known simply as the Central Ground, off Old Road, and as at 2025 remains as a football pitch.

== Notable players ==
- Notable players ( 5 )

One Brynn player, Billy Hibbert, who played for the club in 1905–06, went on to play for England. At the other extreme, another former player, James Ferguson, in 1909 was sentenced to twelve months of hard labour for stealing a mail bag.
