= Ashton Town F.C. (1903) =

- Full name: Ashton Town Football Club
- Nickname: Town
- Founded: 1903
- Dissolved: 1911
- Ground: Recreation Ground
- Chairman: Dr O. Wynn Jones
- Secretary: H. W. Walker
Original colours	From 1905 colours

Ashton Town F.C. was an association football club from Ashton-in-Makerfield, Lancashire, active in the 1900s.

== History ==
The club was founded in May 1903. It instantly joined the second division of the Lancashire Combination and entered the 1903–04 FA Cup qualifying rounds.

The club finished in sixth place - the last promotion spot - by winning the final game against St Helens Town, Gerrard scoring the only goal with 10 minutes to go. Town also reached the second qualifying round of the Cup, the only time it did so, in five entries to 1909–10. The club only lasted one season in the top flight, being relegated after finishing 16th out of 18 in 1904–05. The season had caused the club to incur serious losses, with debts running at over £200, causing the Ashton Recreation Society - which was running the club - to consider pulling out, with further angst from the players of the former Recreation F.C. having been demoted to reserve team level.

The club's financial state required an investigation from the Lancashire Football Association to have its books put in order, and, after finishing second from bottom of the Combination's second division in 1906–07, with only 6 wins from 38 games, the club failed to be re-elected for 1907–08, missing out by one vote. It stepped down to the Lancashire Alliance, and won the title at the first time of asking; even better, the club took over the Combination fixtures of Stalybridge Rovers in April 1908, and was therefore re-elected as a Combination member in its own right for 1908–09.

However the club was being affected by financial difficulties, with the Players Union having to take legal action against the club on behalf of two players. Following "another serious loss on the season's working", the Ashton Town committee resolved to wind up the club in May 1910. Despite this, two of the old committee - Dr Jones and secretary Walker - managed to put together a totally new side for the 1910–11 season, but the side struggled for both performance and gates. At the end of March 1911, with Town bottom of the table after only 1 win in 30 games, and the club attracting gates of only £4, it resigned from the Combination. It was replaced in the competition by Tyldesley Albion, whose bid was preferred to that of Lancaster.

Albion won its first match, against Hindley Central, and was promptly expelled, because of a breach of a condition on allowing it to enter the Combination - it was obliged to field first choice XIs in the Manchester League and had not done so, sending its first XI to the Combination match while its reserves played in the Manchester League, which led to the latter protesting. This led to the Combination putting together enough funds to subsidize Ashton Town to finish the season, which was in fact done, although its last two matches - both against Rossendale United - were a 14–0 defeat away and a 17–0 shellacking at home.

== Colours ==
The club originally wore navy blue and white quarters. In 1905 the club had adopted green jerseys.

== Ground ==
From 1905, the club played at the Recreation Ground, at the end of Council Avenue, to the west of the Bryn Street, and north of the Liverpool Road.

== Notable players ==
- Former players ( 8 )
- Frank Becton, former England international, joined the club for its first season.
