= St Helens Recreation F.C. =

Former association football club

St Helens Recreation Football Club
- Full name: St Helens Recs
- Nicknames: the Recs, the Glassblowers
- Founded: 1897
- Dissolved: 1913
- Ground: City Road
- President: A. R. Pilkington
Home colours

St Helens Recreation F.C. was an association football club from St Helens, Merseyside, active in the late 19th and early 20th century. The club came out of a rugby club of the same name, and changed to the rugby league code in 1913.

== History ==
The club was founded as a rugby club, as the works side of Pilkington Glass, but in 1897 started an association football side, which reached the final of the Lancashire Junior Cup; a sign of the popularity of the association code was that 8,000 turned up for the home semi-final tie with Darwen Olympic in the competition, despite the club raising admission prices. The club lost to Skerton in the final, and made a protest against three of the winner's players as being professionals, but soon withdrew it. The club was also runner-up in the Lancashire Alliance league, finishing level on points with Haydock after losing a crucial match at the latter's Waggon Lane ground in April, but the club did have the consolation of winning the Wigan Association Cup, which it successfully retained in 1898–99.

In March 1898, the club committee decided to disband the rugby side forthwith, and throw in its lot with association football - the rugby side of business had lost money on every home match, and the rugby side's Boundary Road ground was to be out of use for the remaining weeks of the season, for putting into state for cricket. The association side remained in the Alliance for another season, finishing third. It also lost once more to Skerton in the Junior Cup final, the match attracting nearly double the gate of the Senior final.

The club joined the Lancashire Combination in 1899–1900, and the Lancashire League for 1902–03. Its one Lancashire League season saw the club finish 5th of 12, and the League merged with the Combination; the Recs were put in the second division. In 1904–05, the Recs won the second division, and were promoted to the first division.

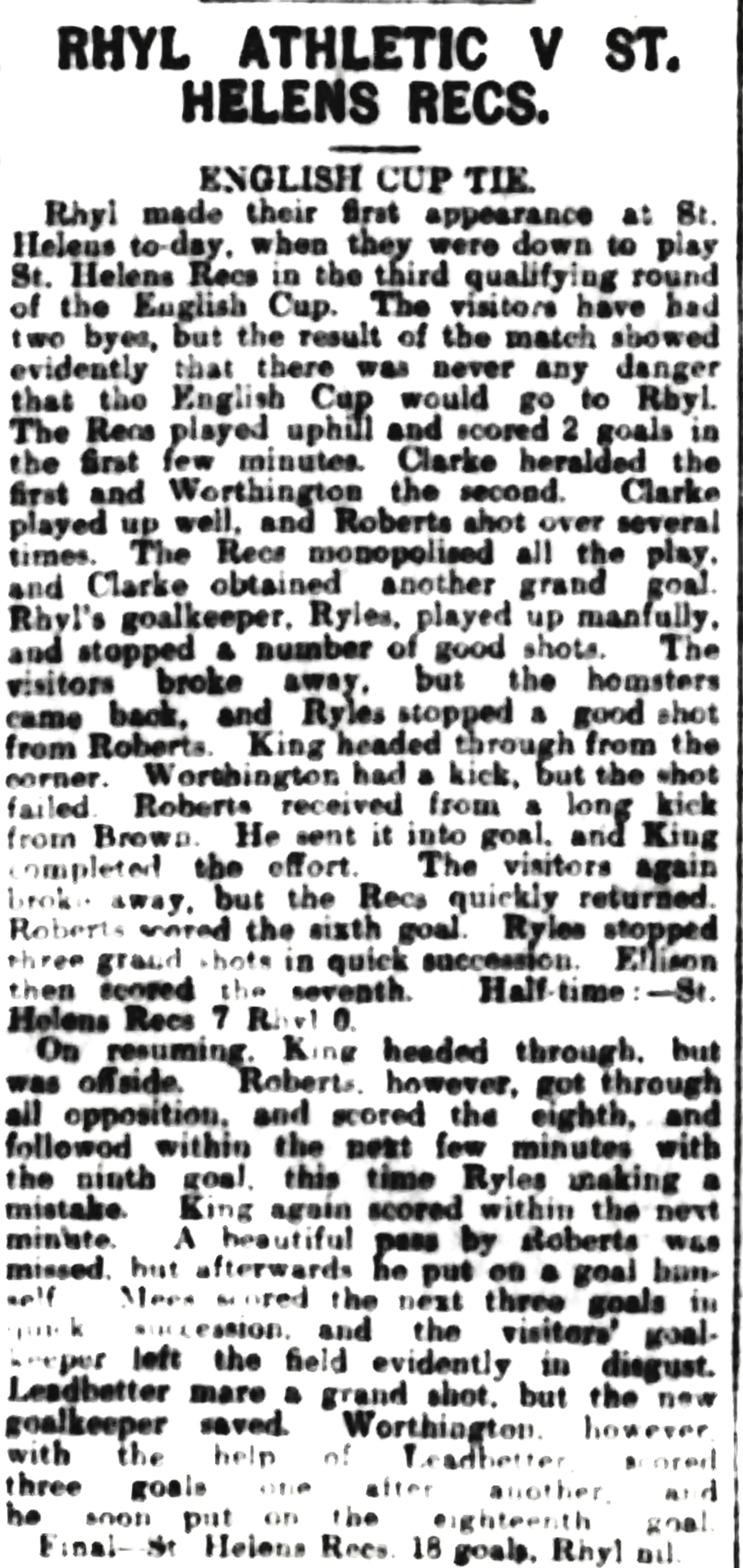
St Helens Recs 18–0 Rhyl Athletic, 1902–03 FA Cup 3rd qualifying round, Liverpool Echo, 1 November 1902

The club had an inconsistent run in the division; it was either in the lower mid-table, or pushing for the title, finishing 4th in 1906–07 and 1908–09, and was runner-up in 1911–12, albeit 12 points behind champions Rochdale.

The Recs were regular FA Cup entrants over the period, but never made the first round proper. It twice reached the fifth and final qualifying round (equivalent in 2025 of the second round), in 1902–03 and 1907–08. In the former season, the club lost 5–0 at Glossop, conceding 4 late goals, and having missed a penalty to make the score 1–1; en route to the fifth round, the Recs beat town rivals St Helens Town in the second round before 5,000 fans at City Road, put a remarkable 18 goals past Rhyl Athletic in the third, and upset Burslem Port Vale in the fourth. In the latter season, the Recs lost 4–1 at home to Chesterfield.

The club also entered the Lancashire Senior Cup from 1902–03 to 1912–13, its best run being to the semi-final in 1909–10; in the second round, the Recs beat Liverpool at Anfield in a replay, coming from behind to win 3–1 with a goal from Holden and two from Fairclough. At the semi-final stage, the club bowed out to Everton at Goodison Park, two goals within a minute in the second half settling matters.

After spending 1912–13 in the middle of the Lancashire Combination top flight table, the club voted to abandon the association code, and take up the rugby league code.

== Colours ==
The original colours of the rugby club were cardinal jerseys with green trim. In 1889 the club described its colours as maroon and white, probably referring to maroon jerseys and white knickers. The football club kept with the maroon jersey scheme. Its change kit was blue.

== Ground ==
Although the rugby side played at Boundary Road, the association side played at the City Road ground on Cowley Hill. The ground was a small one, the club extending it 10 feet in order to avoid a protest from Burslem Port Vale in the 1902 Cup tie.

== Notable players ==
- Former players ( 10 )
