= Haydock F.C. =

Association football club active in the 19th century

Haydock
- Full name: Haydock Football Club
- Nickname: the Colliers
- Founded: 1884
- Dissolved: 1902
- Ground: Waggon Ground
Home colours

Haydock Football Club was an association football club from Haydock, in Lancashire, active around the turn of the 20th century.

== History ==
The first reference to the club is from the 1884–85 season. It entered the Lancashire Senior Cup for the first time in 1885, and reached the third round (last 14), where it lost 8–0 to Rossendale.

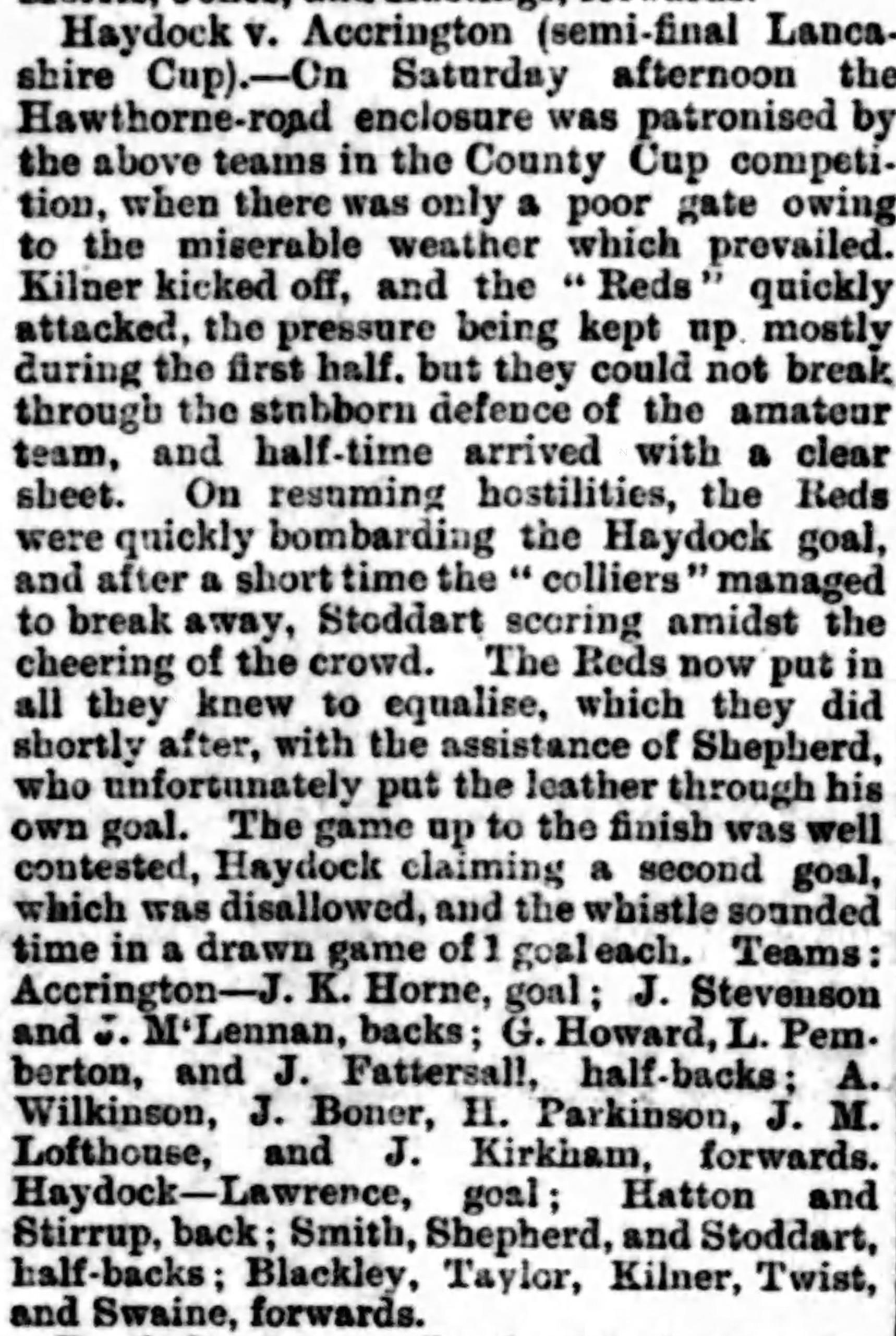
1888–89 Lancashire Senior Cup semi-final, Accrington 1–1 Haydock, Bootle Times 23 March 1889

As an amateur side of "second class school" footballers in the professional stronghold of Lancashire, the club was never likely to be successful, but it unexpectedly reached the semi-final of the Lancashire Cup in 1888–89, one of its victims en route being Darwen; Darwen turned up at Haydock late and with only 9 players, and the Colliers won 3–2. In the last four stage, the club met the professional side Accrington at Bootle's Hawthorne Road ground. The tie was considered to be a foregone conclusion for the Owd Reds, and an indication of the difference in size of the two sides is that only around 50 people went along as supporters of the Colliers. However, the match ended 1–1, and Haydock even thought it had won the match, with an ostensibly winning goal disallowed. Accrington won the replay 6–1.

Haydock could not capitalize on this sudden run; indeed it temporarily stopped entering the Lancashire Cup in 1891. The club however joined the Lancashire Alliance in the competition's second season in 1891–92, and enjoyed success at that level, winning the title in 1893–94, 1894–95, and 1897–98. The club also recorded the record victory in the competition, in April 1895, beating Kearsley 20–0.

In 1898–99, the club finished second to Earlestown, but, in February 1899, the Lancashire League invited Haydock to take over the record of the folding Rock Ferry. The club accepted, and finished the season in mid-table, doubling the 10 points which Rock Ferry had accumulated.

However the club struggled in more exalted company. After another mid-table finish in 1899–1900, it finished the 1900–01 and 1901–02 seasons bottom, with only 2 wins in the final season. The final season saw the club having to rely on junior players, and included such disasters as having to switch its home fixture with Rochdale to play it away from home, and then only having 8 men appear. Even worse, the club's committee members were held to be personally liable for a printing debt, as the club had not converted to a limited liability company.

The club's only FA Cup ties (in the 1900–01 and 1901–02 qualifying rounds) were first round defeats; the latter was a 4–1 home defeat to Wigan United, the visitors taking advantage of a strong wind in the first half to turn around four goals to the good, and its last two ties in the Lancashire Cup ended ignominiously. In 1900–01, Haydock drew 1–1 with Rochdale but did not turn up to the replay, resulting in an order to pay £4 in compensation to Rochdale; and in 1901–02 it lost 5–0 at Nelson. After the disastrous 1901–02 season, the club resigned from the Lancashire League (replaced by St Helens Recreation), and disbanded.

== Colours ==
The club's original colours were white shirts; in the 20th century they were black and amber.

== Ground ==
The club played at a ground adjoining the Wagon Hotel; in 1895 the club was threatened with eviction. but continued playing there, with the area renamed the Waggon Ground. The club was temporarily barred from using the ground in December 1897 following crowd trouble.
