= Leyland F.C. =

Defunct association football club in Leyland, England

- Full name: Leyland Football Club
- Founded: 1883
- Dissolved: 1926
- Ground: May Festival Ground
- President: the Rev. L. Baldwin (1897), Norris Bretherton (1900s), from 1909 John Stanning
| Original colours | 1910s colours |

Leyland F.C. was an association football club from Leyland, Lancashire, active in the early part of the 20th century.

== History ==
The earliest references to the club are from the 1883–84 season - an earlier Leyland Football Club being a rugby union side. In 1886, made the news in odd circumstances, when one Blundell was ordered to pay £1 compensation to a James Ainsworth, to whom the club had given money for buying watches as prizes for a club tournament - Blundell accused Ainsworth of having "ripped off" the club for £2.

=== First Lancashire Alliance stint ===
The club applied to join the Lancashire Alliance in 1894, but it was not accepted. It tried again in 1897, having won the Preston & District League in 1895–96 and 1896–97, and this time was successful. It originally only played in the Alliance in the 1897–98 season; after a mid-table finish it joined the Lancashire Combination, staying in the Combination until the 1900–01 season, when, after three finishes in the bottom five, the club did not seek re-election.

The club came very close to going under in 1902, after a season in abeyance. Secretary J. W. Baron going so far as putting the club's strip up for sale, and on 5 December 1902 the board passed a resolution to wind up the club, owing to the suitability of not being able to find a suitable ground; the club was not insolvent, having a positive balance of £8. However the club was re-constituted in 1903, having persuaded a Mrs Singleton to remove a fence on Chapelbrow to make a new ground.

=== Return to the Alliance ===
The club duly resolved to apply to join the Lancashire Alliance, which was struggling for members, and in 1904–05, the club's second season back in the Alliance, Leyland finished level on points with Walkden Central at the top of the league. Leyland had the better goal average, but, as that was not used as a tie-breaker, the sides played off for the championship at Farnworth, Central having won the toss for choice of ground. Leyland let slip a 3–0 and 4–2 lead to draw 4–4, and refused to play extra-time, on account of a number of players being injured; at first it was agreed to share the trophy and championship flag, each club to hold the spoils for six months, and Leyland duly returned home to a celebration, with captain Jimmy Cooper carrying the trophy on the train. However, at a meeting later in May, the Alliance committee resolved that Walkden would be awarded the title, due to Leyland refusing to play extra-time.

=== West Lancashire League ===
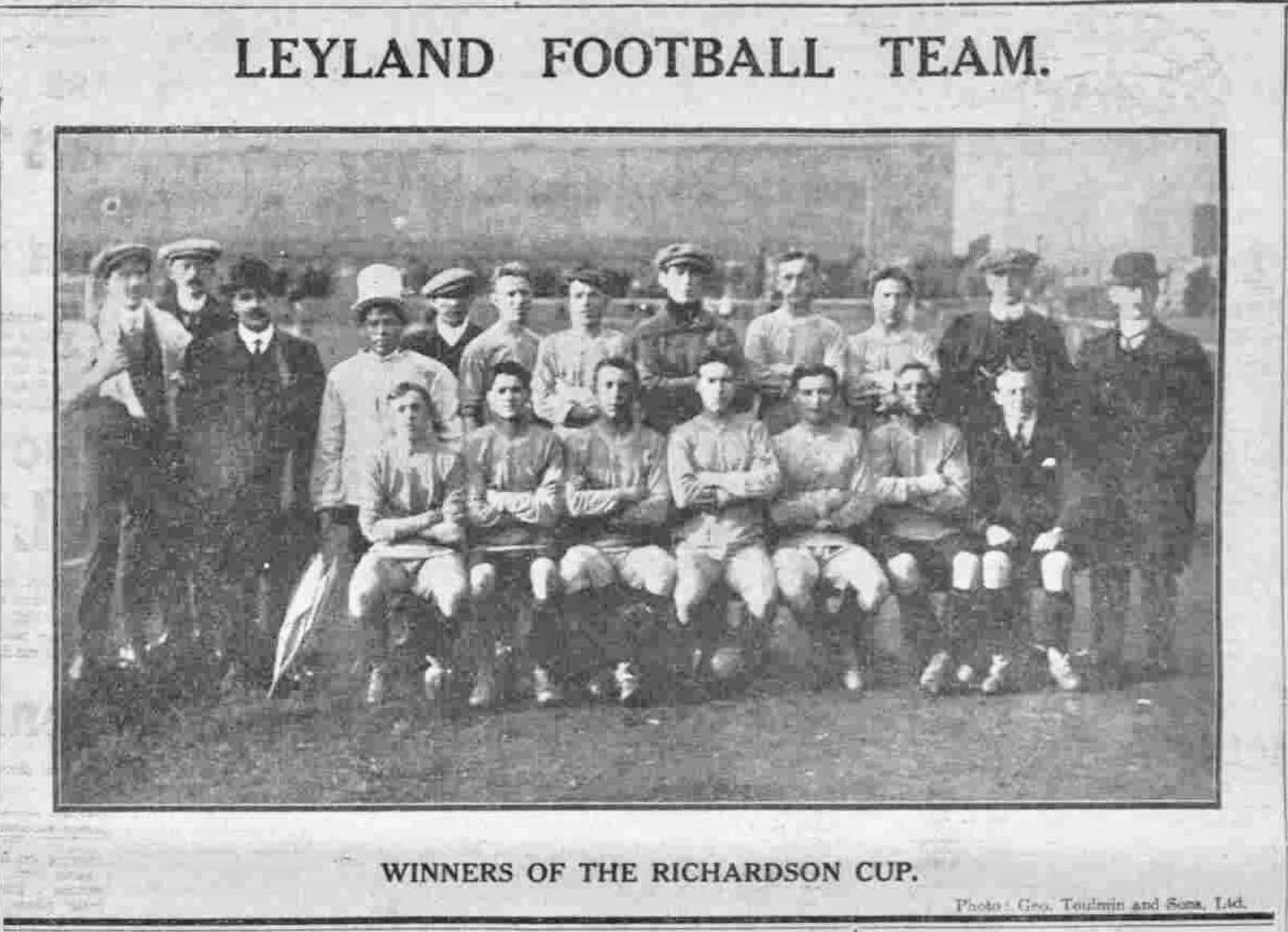
The Leyland side which won the Richardson Cup in 1913, from the 21 April edition of the Lancashire Daily Post.

After the 1907–08 season, Leyland quit the Alliance to apply for the West Lancashire League, a more local league, with more local rivalries and less travelling expense. The move instantly paid off, as Leyland became champion in the 1908–09 season, and, after staying near the top of the table until the First World War, took a second title in 1914–15. It also won the competition's knockout cup, the Richardson Cup, in 1912–13, two first-half goals being enough to beat Southport Central reserves at Chorley's St George's Park.

The club also started to enter the enter the FA Cup qualifying rounds from 1910–11, although the only season before the First World War in which it won more than one tie was 1912–13, losing to Nelson in the second qualifying round (having started in a preliminary round).

The club's best run in the Lancashire Junior Cup came in 1913–14, when Leyland reached the final, against Heywood United, played at Fleetwood. It however was a disappointing occasion for Leyland, Heywood scoring three goals in the last twenty minutes for a 4–0 win.

The club's first post-war season, in 1918–19, was so successful - the club winning both the West Lancashire League (with Leyland Motors in 8th place, the only season in which both the town and the motor side played in the same league) and the Richardson Cup - that it sought election back to the Lancashire Combination, one of the recruited players being Frederick Bond, nephew of England international Dicky Bond. The club duly succeeded in its election application, beating claims from Leyland Motors, and a second Leyland Motors club from Chorley.

=== Lancashire Combination ===
The club continued to enter the FA Cup qualifying rounds to 1925–26. Its best post-war run was winning twice in 1921–22 to reach the second qualifying round; in 1923–24 Leyland won the "derby" against Leyland Motors in the preliminary round.

After mid-table finishes between 1920–21 and 1923–24, the club plummeted to the bottom of the Combination in 1924–25, and failed re-election; it was replaced in the Combination by the Preston Corinthians, a club linked to Preston North End, which was also using the Festival ground. The club re-joined the West Lancashire League for 1925–26, but was in serious financial difficulties; it launched a shilling fund in January 1926, to clear a debt of £100 at a time when the average gate receipts were £3. After finishing third from bottom, the club resigned at the end of the season, being replaced in the competition by Leyland Motors, and disbanded.

== Colours ==
The club originally wore amber and black shirts. On its resurrection, it adopted blue shirts, and in the post-war years it wore blue or red shirts.

== Ground ==
The club originally played at the May Festival Grounds. On its resurrection in 1903, the club played at the Chapelbrow ground, and returned to the Festival Grounds after the war.

== Achievements ==
- FA Cup
  - Best performance: 2nd qualifying round, 1912–13, 1921–22
- Lancashire Alliance
  - Runner-up: 1904–05
- Lancashire Junior Cup
  - Runner-up: 1913–14
- West Lancashire League
  - Winner: 1908–09, 1914–15, 1918–19
- Richardson Cup (West Lancashire League Cup)
  - Winner: 1912–13
- Preston Junior League
  - Winner: 1895–96, 1896–97

== Notable players ==
- Former players ( 4 )
