= Earlestown F.C. (1880) =

Earlestown
- Full name: Earlestown Football Club
- Founded: 1880
- Dissolved: 1911
- Ground: The Mesnes
1886–c. 1903 colours

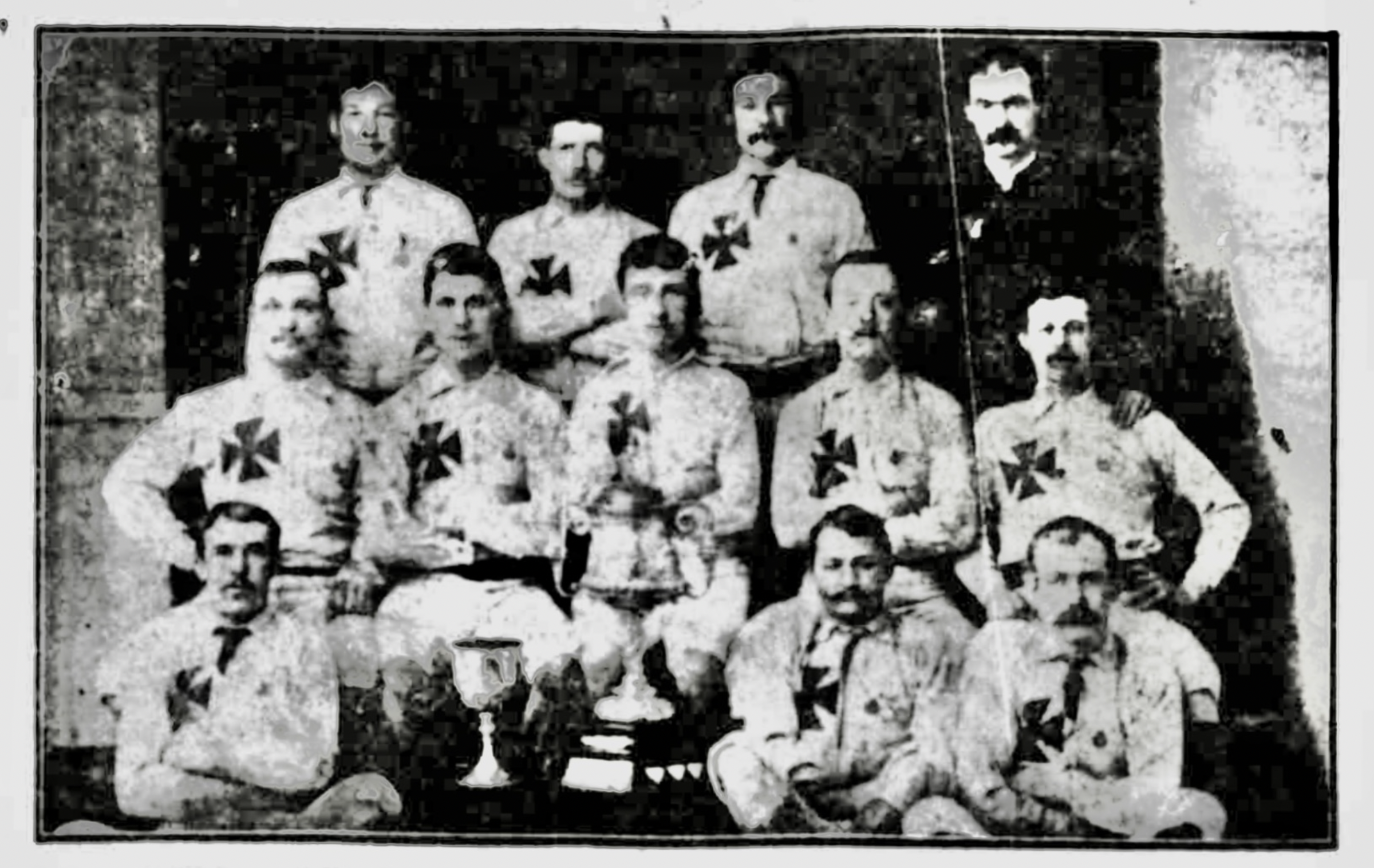
Earlestown F.C., 1884–85, with the Liverpool Senior Cup and Wellington Cup, Liverpool Football Echo, 12 October 1912

Earlestown Football Club was an association football club from Earlestown in Lancashire.

== History ==
The club was founded in 1880 and it made its senior football bow in the Lancashire Senior Cup in 1881.

The club's greatest successes came in the era before the game turned professional. It was a strong power in the west Lancashire area, and reached the Liverpool Senior Cup final in 1883–84, 1884–85, and 1888–89. Its first two finals were both against Everton, and a 1–0 win at Hawthorne Road in 1885 in front of over 4,000 (with 700 fans travelling on a special train), the goal coming from a scrimmage which bundled goalkeeper Lindsay over the line, saw the Cup go to Earlestown for the only time. The power of the resources available to clubs in the new Football League however was quickly demonstrated - in 1889–90, Earlestown met Everton in the semi-final, and was hammered 13–2.

Earlestown was one of the founder members of the Lancashire League in 1889, having turned professional in 1888, and having its expenditure increase to £200. The club lost its first four matches, before picking up a win by beating the similarly pointless Rossendale 5–3 at home in October. Earlestown won four matches - the others being a double over West Manchester, which was top of the table when Earlestown won the home fixture, and a breathless 6–5 win in the return at Rossendale - and one more win, against Hyde, was stricken from the record because of crowd violence. The match was never re-played; Earlestown was expelled before season end for not fulfilling its fixtures, with the club only ahead of Rossendale at the time.

The club re-entered league football via the Lancashire Alliance in 1894, winning that competition in 1895–96 and 1898–99. Off the back of this latter success, it re-joined the Lancashire League before the 1899–1900 season, staying in mid-table until the competition was absorbed into the Lancashire Combination in 1903. Earlestown started off in the second division, and was promoted in its first season.

It yo-yoed between the two divisions over the next decade, its best finish being 14th (out of 18) in the first division in 1904–05. Its greatest successes came in the Lancashire Junior Cup, winning it for the first time in 1903–04, coming from behind to beat Bolton St Luke's 3–1. It won the trophy a second time in 1906-07 without playing a single tie at home; although the final was on Christmas 1906, there was little seasonal spirit in the air, Earlestown beating Lancaster 3–1 in extra-time, but a fight near the end saw Earlestown's Valentine, and Lancaster's Cook and Sanderson, all sent off.

Despite its early prominence, Earlestown did not enter the FA Cup until 1900–01, and in its first entry it reached the fourth qualifying round, the penultimate stage; the match at home to Nantwich was considered to be a foregone conclusion, but the visitors won 3–2. That run proved to be Earlestown's best, which it matched in 1905–06, when it lost 2–0 at Barnsley.

Before the start of the 1911–12 season, the reserve sides of Football League clubs, which had been the backbone of the Combination, withdrew for a new competition. Denuded of clubs, the Combination "promoted" 11 of its division two sides - including Earlestown - into the first division. However the costs and standard proved too much for the club, and Earlestown disbanded in October due to lack of support, with a debt of £200, albeit that was eventually cleared. Earlestown's record of 1 win in its 5 fixtures (in which it had conceded 21 goals) was taken over by second division side Heywood United, and Barnoldswick was elected to the second to fill the second division vacancy.

== Colours ==
The club's original colours were blue and white, changing in 1886 to white jerseys with what was described as a red Maltese cross on the right breast, although photographic evidence shows it to have been a cross pattée.

The club retained the design until at least 1903–04, and by 1905–06 had changed to light blue shirts.

== Ground ==
The club played at The Mesnes, originally using the Sunbeam Inn for facilities.

== Notable players ==
- Tom Bradshaw
- Andrew Gara
- Arthur Gee
- Owen Jones
- Fred Valentine

== Honours ==
- Lancashire Alliance
  - Winner: 1895–96, 1898–99
- Liverpool Senior Cup
  - Winner: 1884–85
  - Runner-up: 1883–84, 1888–89
- Wigan Association Challenge Cup
  - Winner: 1886–87
