= Farnworth Standard F.C. =

Association football club active in the 19th century

- Full name: Farnworth Standard Football Club
- Nickname: Standard
- Founded: 1883
- Dissolved: 1895
- Ground: Bennett Street
- Secretary: J. A. Young and Lot Lee
Original colours

Farnworth Standard F.C. was an association football club from Farnworth, near Bolton, Lancashire, active in the late 19th century.

== History ==
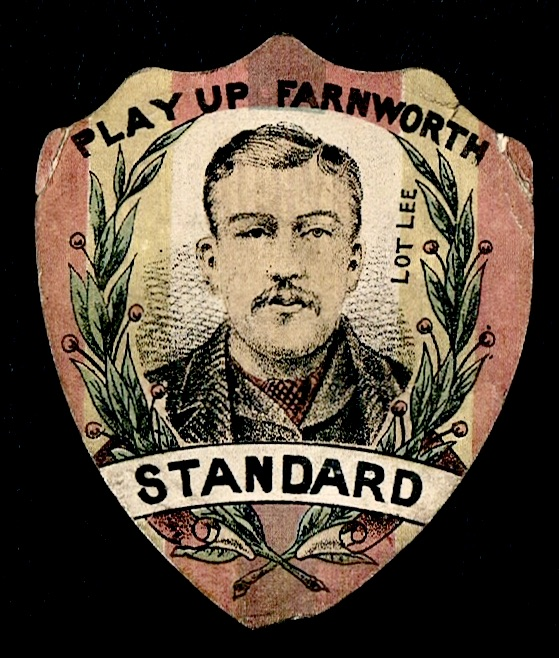
John Baines collectable card from the 1891–92 season depicting Farnworth Standard player Lot Lee

The first reference to the football club is from September 1883, the side being formed from the Farnworth Standard cricket club.

On 28 July 1886, the club played a friendly match at Little Hulton. Alfred Turner, a 23 year old half-back playing for Standard, jumped at Samuel Blakeley of the home side; Blakeley set himself up to receive the charge on his shoulder, as expected, but Turner turned in mid-air and hit with his side, instantly collapsing to the ground. A Dr Marsh, playing in the game, examined Turner and had him taken to the Kenyon Arms, but Turner died the next night of internal injuries. Before dying, he made a statement exonerating Blakeley of all blame. The Standard committee members took Turner's body from his Burnden home to Bolton Cemetery the following Monday.

The club's first success of note was in winning a 15 guinea trophy put up by fellow Farnworth side Kearsley in 1886–87, beating the host 2–1. The same season, the club had apparently reached the semi-final of the Lancashire Junior Cup, but its victim in the quarter-final, Fleetwood Rangers, protested against a player named Edwards, on the basis that he had not lived within 6 miles of Farnworth for the required 2 years. The wrinkle was that Edwards had not appeared since the first round (in a 6–2 win over Lower Hurst); nevertheless the Lancashire Football Association disqualified Standard, and awarded the tie to the Rangers. Standard never reached the final four again.

In 1887–88, the club reached the final the Bolton Charity Cup - it had lost 4–1 in a semi-final replay against holder Halliwell, but a protest about Halliwell's goalkeeper Ingram meant a second replay was required, and Halliwell withdrew rather than meet Standard a third time. The final - away at Bolton Wanderers - ended 5–1 to the home side.

Standard was a founder member of the Lancashire Alliance, under the competition's original name of the Lancashire Junior League, in 1889. It was runner-up in 1892–93, four points behind champion Chorley. However, after a financially difficult 1893–94 season, the club looked to merge with Kearsley in August 1894; both clubs foresaw difficulties from Bolton Wanderers' proposed move to Burnden Park, much closer to the village than hitherto, but "lamentably" the merger did not take place, and both clubs continued separately into 1894–95, Standard augmenting its income by putting down a cinder track for cyclists around its ground.

The move delayed the inevitable, as in April 1895, the club collapsed completely, while lying 14th out of 15 in the Alliance table, only Kearsley sitting below it. The club's record was expunged, and at the end of the season it merged with the similarly debt-riddled Kearsley, the merged club being called Farnworth F.C. and playing at the Kearsley ground. The merger did not succeed, and by the end of 1895 Farnworth wound up and resigned from the Alliance.

== Colours ==
The club originally wore black and amber striped shirts. By 1890 it was wearing white jerseys.

== Ground ==
After sharing the cricket ground, in 1884 the club moved to a new ground at Dixon Green, and from 1885 it played at Bennett Street.

== Notable figures ==
- Tom Helme, a founder of Great Lever F.C., who became secretary of the club, and later turned his hand to refereeing, taking charge of at least one Lancashire Senior Cup final
