= Lytham F.C. =

Lytham
- Full name: Lytham Football Club
- Nickname: the Seasiders
- Founded: 1878
- Dissolved: 1986
- Ground: Ballam Road
- Manager: Jimmy Daniels
- 1984–85: North West Counties Football League Division Three, 6th
Home colours

Lytham F.C. was an English football club located in Lytham, in Lancashire. The club spent most of its history in the Lancashire Combination, before entering the North West Counties Football League in the 1980s and folding after three seasons. The club reached the first round of the FA Cup in 1925–26, and the third round of the FA Vase twice in the late 1970s.

== History ==
The earliest record of the club is of a 2–0 win over Blackpool Victoria in March 1878. The club entered the Lancashire Senior Cup from 1882–83 to 1884–85, only winning one tie (2–0 at home to Adlington in its second entry). After the creation of the Lancashire Junior Cup, the club switched its attentions to the new competition, its greatest moment coming in the 1894–95 season, when it won the trophy, beating Rawtenstall in the final at Gigg Lane, W. Tuson scoring the only goal in the last five minutes.after Toulmin had headed a loose ball to him. By this time the club had won the Lancashire Alliance championship, in 1891–92, during a brief dalliance with professionalism.

Around 1900, the club changed its name to Lytham Institute F.C., under which name it joined the Lancashire Football Association for the 1900–01 season. It reached the Junior Cup final for the second (and last) time in 1902–03, losing 2–0 to Turton in extra-time at Bloomfield Road, the result all the more galling as Lytham's Richardson had had a penalty saved just before half-time. The club entered the Lancashire Combination Division Two in 1904–05, but finished bottom and did not seek re-election. After a financially difficult 1905–06 season, it changed its name back to Lytham.

Lytham entered the FA Cup for the first time in 1925–26 and reached the first round, although a "commendably plucky" Lytham went down 10–1 at Football League Second Division side Oldham Athletic. They rejoined the Combination in 1929 and played in the league until 1936. After the Second World War, Lytham rejoined the Lancashire Combination Division Two, finishing in the top half of the league in every season through to 1959, gaining promotion to Division One. They were relegated in 1963 to Division Two, which was later renamed Division One, and in 1968, the two leagues were merged. Lytham were again relegated from the combination in 1971, only to rejoin in 1975. In the late 1970s Lytham reached the third round of the FA Vase twice.

In 1982, the Lancashire Combination amalgamated with the Cheshire County League to form the North West Counties Football League; Lytham was included in the new Division Two. It was relegated to Division Three in 1984, and expelled the league altogether in 1985, due to the club's ground not being up to standard. The club suffered a further, fatal, blow before the 1986–87 season, when the Blackpool & Fylde League refused to let the club use the ground on the basis that the pitch was continually waterlogged. The club was unable to use the YMCA ground on Seafield Road as another club had already been given priority, and the club did not emerge for the new season.

== Colours ==
The earliest reference to the club's colours is it wearing red and white striped shirts in 1889. Its traditional colours were amber and black, in stripes before 1933, when it changed to halves. In later years it wore red and white shirts with black shorts.

== Ground ==
The club played at Ballam Road from 1886 until its demise.

== Records ==
- FA Cup
  - Best performance: first round proper, 1925–26
- FA Vase
  - Best perforance: third round, 1977–78 and 1978–79

== Former players ==
1. Players that have played/managed in the Football League or any foreign equivalent to this level (i.e. fully professional league).
2. Players with full international caps.
3. Players that hold a club record or have captained the club.

- (England) Henry Parkinson
