= Atherton F.C. =

Atherton
- Full name: Atherton Football Club
- Nickname: the Churchmen
- Founded: 1898
- Dissolved: 1930
- Ground: Flapper Fold Lane
Home colours

Atherton F.C. was an English football club located in Atherton, in Lancashire. The club spent most of its history in the Lancashire Combination.

== History ==
The club was founded as Atherton Church House in September 1898, and joined the Lancashire Combination at the end of 1903 in unusual circumstances; Rochdale Town, which had struggled to 2 wins and 2 draws from 15 matches, resigned, and Atherton picked up the Townsmen's fixtures and record, earning 11 wins in the remaining 19 matches and registering a mid-table finish.

In the 1904–05 season, the club finished in fourth place and earned promotion to the First Division. The club changed their name to Atherton F.C. in 1906, at the same time becoming a limited company, and continued in the Lancashire Combination, dropping back to the Second Division in 1909. Third place in 1913 gained them promotion back to the top division, where they remained until the First World War.

After the war, the Lancashire Combination reverted to one division, in which Atherton continued to play until October 1930, when, after losing all nine of its league games, it withdrew and disbanded. Its fixtures were taken over by Rochdale A.F.C. reserves.

The club's best run in the FA Cup came in 1906–07, when they lost 4–1 to Oldham Athletic in a replay after a 1–1 draw in the fourth qualifying round.

== Colours ==
The club's colours were black and white.

== Ground ==
The club played at Flapper Fold Lane.

== Notable players ==
- Notable players ( 16 )

== See also ==
- Atherton Collieries A.F.C.
- Atherton Laburnum Rovers F.C.
