= List of Lincoln City F.C. players =

The Lincoln City F.C. team of 1889–90, founder members of the Midland League. Players include Quentin Neill (seated, second right) and John Irving (on ground, centre).

Lincoln City Football Club, an English association football club based in Lincoln, Lincolnshire, was founded in 1884, and first entered the FA Cup in the 1884–85 season. When nationally organised league football in England began, the club joined the Combination, a league set up to provide organised football for those clubs not invited to join the Football League which was to start the same year. When that league folded, Lincoln became one of the founder members of the Midland League, and won the inaugural league title. They then spent a year in the Football Alliance before being elected to the newly formed Second Division of the Football League. Lincoln moved in and out of the Football League until they became founder members of the Football League Third Division North in 1921. They remained in the Football League until 1987, when they became the first club to suffer automatic relegation to the Football Conference. They returned to the League after just one season, remained at that level until they were again relegated in 2011, and returned once more in 2017.

All players who have made at least 100 appearances in senior first-team matches for Lincoln City, in league or cup competition, are listed below. Grant Brown holds the record for Lincoln City appearances, having played 491 matches between 1989 and 2002, of which 407 were in the Football League. Tony Emery is the only other Lincoln player with more than 400 Football League appearances, and he and Dave Smith the only other two with 400 competitive appearances in total. The goalscoring record is held by Andy Graver, with 143 league goals, and 150 in total, scored over three spells with the club between 1950 and 1961. Johnny Campbell is the only other Lincoln player to have scored 100 Football League goals. Goalkeeper David Felgate is the only man in this appearance range to have played senior international football while with Lincoln City; he received his only cap for Wales as a half-time substitute for Neville Southall in a friendly against Romania in 1983.

== Key ==
General
The list is ordered first by number of appearances in total, then by number of League appearances, and then if necessary by date of debut.
Appearances as a substitute are included.
Statistics are correct up to 11 May 2024.
Name
Players marked * were registered for the club as at the date specified above.
Players with name in italics and marked † were on loan from another club for the duration of their Lincoln City career. The loaning club is noted in the Refs column.

Positions key
Pre-1960s		1960s–	
GK	Goalkeeper		
FB	Full back	DF	Defender
HB	Half-back	MF	Midfielder
FW	Forward		

Position
Playing positions are listed according to the tactical formations that were employed at the time. Thus the change in the names of defensive and midfield positions reflects the tactical evolution that occurred from the 1960s onwards.
Club career
Club career is defined as the first and last calendar years in which the player appeared for the club in any of the competitions listed below.
League appearances and League goals
League appearances and goals are those in the Football League only. Appearances in the 1939–40 Football League season, abandoned after three games because of the Second World War, are excluded.
Total appearances and Total goals
Total appearances and goals comprise those in the Football League, Football League play-offs, FA Cup, League Cup, EFL Trophy and predecessors, FA Trophy, National League and predecessors, and Conference League Cup. Also included are appearances and goals in the following defunct competitions: the Combination, Football Alliance, Midland League, the Central League, Third Division North Cup, Watney Cup, and Football League Group Cup. Matches in wartime competitions are excluded.
International selection
Countries are listed only for players who have been selected for international football. Only the highest level of international competition is given. Where appropriate, the number of senior international caps won while a Lincoln City player is listed in parentheses after the country name.

== Players with 100 or more appearances ==
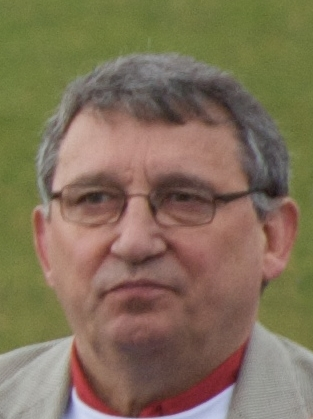
Graham Taylor became Lincoln City manager at 28 and led the club to the 1976 Fourth Division title; he went on to manage the England team.

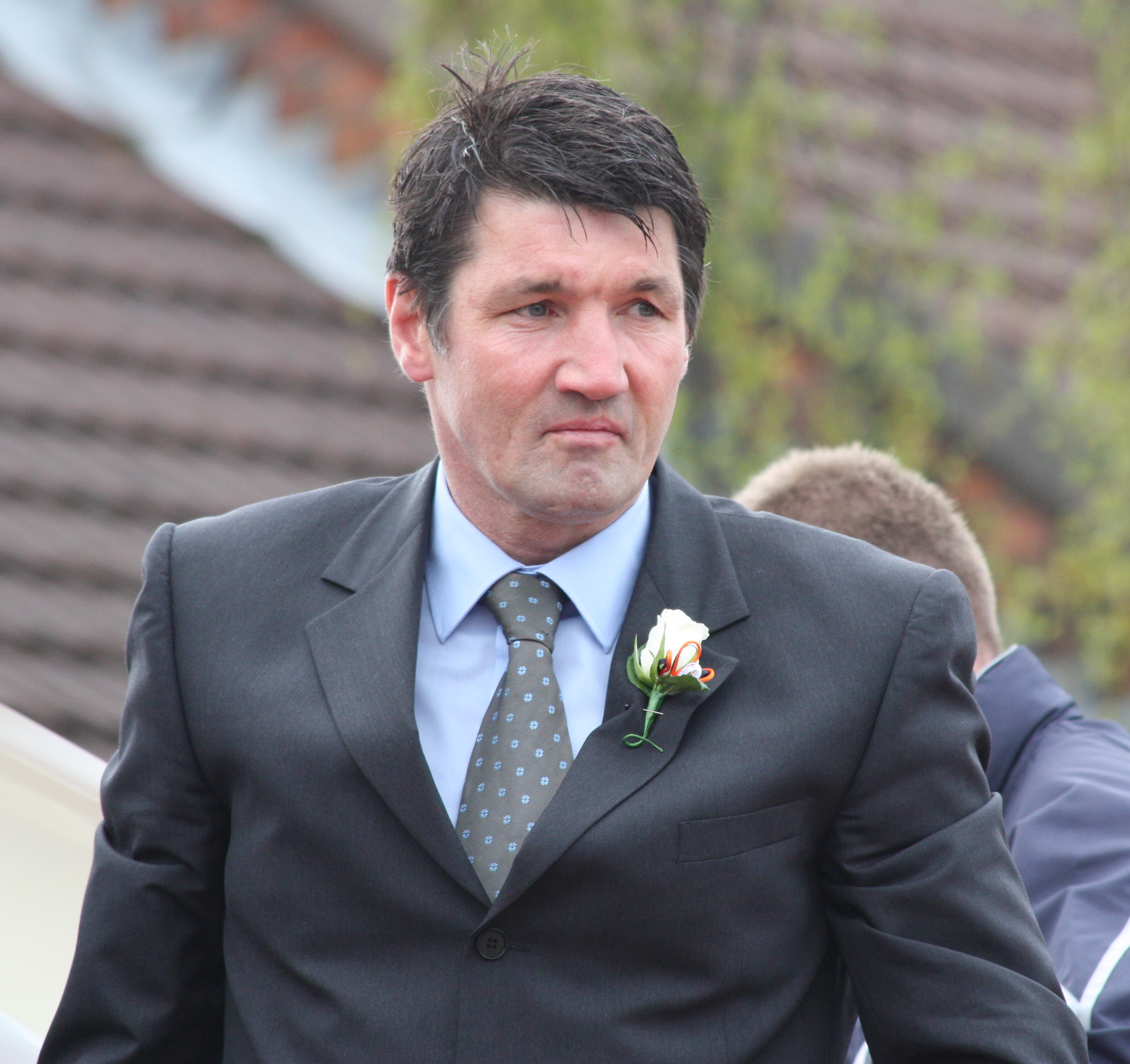
England international centre forward Mick Harford began his long career at Lincoln City.

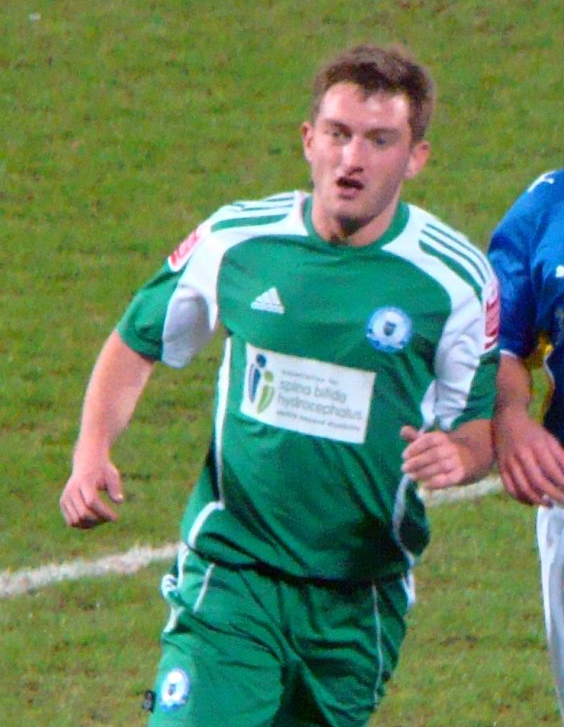
Lee Frecklington played for Ireland B while a Lincoln City player.

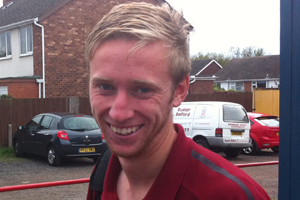
Danny Hone was one of just three players retained when Lincoln were relegated to the Conference in 2011.

Table of players, including playing position, club statistics and international selection
Name	Position	Club career	League apps	League goals	Total apps	Total goals	International selection	Refs
Grant Brown	DF	1989–2002	407	15	469	18		(Note: Leicester City)
Tony Emery	HB	1945–1958	402	1	424	1		(Note: The Lincoln City FC Archive includes appearances and goals from the various wartime leagues in totals on individual player pages. Totals for affected players are amended using the Season Stats dropdown menu at the bottom right of each player's individual page.)
Dave Smith	MF	1968–1978	371	52	420	59	English schools	
Alan Marriott	GK	2000–2008	351	0	395	0		
Gordon Hobson	FW	1978–1985; 1988–1990	333	96	386	105		
Phil Neale	DF	1975–1985	335	22	369	22		
Jeff Smith	DF	1958–1967	315	2	351	2		
George Fraser	HB	1901–1911	265	4	330	4		
Dan McPhail	GK	1931–1939	309	0	329	0		
George Whyte	FW	1931–1939	299	35	322	37		
Harry Pringle	FW	1922–1934	292	60	315	64		
Fred Middleton	HB	1954–1963	300	16	315	16		
Harry Troops	FW / FB	1949–1958	295	32	310	35		
Roger Holmes	MF	1960–1971	278	36	307	40		
Paul M. Smith	DF	1987–1995	232	27	305	40		
Terry Cooper	DF	1971–1972; 1972–1979	270	12	299	13		(Note: Notts County)
Phil Hubbard	MF	1966–1971; 1976–1979	261	53	295	60		
John Schofield	MF	1988–1994; 2000–2001	250	11	293	16		
Roy Finch	FW	1949–1958	275	56	291	58		
Andy Graver	FW	1950–1954; 1955; 1958–1961	274	143	289	150		
Bert Linnecor	HB	1957–1964	264	52	287	55		
Phil Turner	MF	1980–1986	239	18	283	20		
Jim Grummett, Jr.	DF	1963–1971	251	19	279	21	England youth	
John Kennedy	GK	1967–1974	251	0	278	0		
George Shipley	MF	1980–1985	230	42	274	52		
John Ward	FW	1971–1979; 1982	241	90	263	99		
Peter Grotier	GK	1974–1979	233	0	263	0		
Peter Gain	MF	1999–2005	228	21	263	22	Republic of Ireland U21	
Alan Power	MF	2011–2017	0	0	261	35	Republic of Ireland U21	
Wattie Wilson	FB	1907–1914	171	6	255	7		
Bobby Owen	HB	1947–1954	246	5	255	5		
George Peden	DF	1967–1974	225	15	252	18		
Bob Jackson	DF	1956–1964	235	0	251	0		
Paul Farman	GK	2011; 2012–2018	13	0	250	0	England C	(Note: Gateshead)
Scott Kerr	MF	2005–2011	222	8	249	9	England C	
Lee Beevers	DF	2005–2009; 2015–2016	166	9	249	11	Wales U21	
Doug Wright	HB	1948–1954	233	2	246	2	England	
Jason Barnett	DF	1995–2002	208	6	239	6		
Paul Morgan	DF	2001–2007	212	2	238	2	Northern Ireland U21	
Clem Jackson	FB	1909–1920	184	0	236	0		
Alan Harding	MF	1973–1979	209	38	234	43		
David Felgate	GK	1980–1985	198	0	232	0	Wales (1)	
Steve Holmes	DF	1995–1996; 1996–2001	201	32	230	37		(Note: Preston North End)
Dennis Leigh	DF	1973–1979	206	4	229	4		
Lee Thorpe	FW	1997–2002	192	58	222	67		
Glenn Cockerill	MF	1977–1979; 1981–1984	186	35	222	40		
Horace Green	DF	1949–1954	212	14	220	14		
Steve Thompson	DF	1980–1988; 1989–1990	181	8	217	11		
David Clarke	DF	1987–1993	147	9	214	17	England youth	
Albert Worthy	FB	1927–1933	198	5	211	5		
Terry Fleming	MF	1995–2000	184	8	210	12		
Shane Nicholson	DF	1986–1992; 1966–1997	141	7	209	10		(Note: Chesterfield)
Johnny Campbell	FW	1933–1939	184	104	207	110		
Harry Anderson	MF	2016; 2017–2021	142	19	207	33		(Note: Peterborough United)
Nat Brown	DF	2005–2008; 2013–2015	94	8	207	11		(Note: Macclesfield Town)
Dave Puttnam	MF	1990–1995	177	21	204	22		
Trevor Peake	DF	1979–1983	171	7	202	10	England C	
Dave Carr	DF	1979–1983	168	4	202	5		
Stuart Bimson	DF	1996–2003	175	3	201	4		
Alf Jones	DF	1962–1967	180	3	200	3		
Matt Rhead	FW	2015–2019	75	9	196	50		
Paul Mayo	DF	2000–2004; 2005–2007	168	10	195	14		
Sam Ellis	DF	1973–1977	173	33	194	41	England U23	
William McMillan	FB / HB	1898–1904; 1906	178	1	194	1		
Johnny Garvie	FW	1950–1956	184	78	192	80		
Lee Frecklington	MF	2003–2009; 2018–2019	167	28	192	30	Republic of Ireland B	
Doug Graham	FB	1951–1957	182	0	191	0		
Andy Gardner	HB	1909–1919	151	9	191	14		
Ian Branfoot	DF	1973–1977	166	11	189	12		
Roy Chapman	FW	1957–1961; 1965–1967	175	77	187	81		
Billy Bean	HB / FB	1935–1949	171	10	187	10		
Dennis Booth	MF	1974–1977	162	9	186	10		
Tosh Barrell	FW	1908–1915	141	26	186	43		
Paul A. Smith	MF	1997–2003	156	18	184	21		
Graham Bressington	MF	1987–1993	141	7	183	9		
Ray Harford	DF	1967–1971	161	10	182	10		
Alf Horne	FW	1932–1936	166	36	181	39		
Percy Freeman	FW	1970–1972; 1975–1977	152	64	181	76		
Corkie Blow	HB	1901–1906	162	1	180	1		
Jim Grummett Sr.	HB	1945–1951	165	12	179	12		
Peter Graham	FW	1973–1978	158	47	178	53		
John McGinley	MF	1984–1986; 1987–1989	112	18	176	39		
Tommy Wield	HB	1904–1906; 1909–1915	131	5	172	6		
Jimmy Munro	FW	1953–1958	161	24	171	25		
Graham Taylor	DF	1968–1973	151	1	170	2		
Dick Neal Jr.	HB	1954–1957; 1963–1964	156	15	169	17	England U23	
Tommy Fern	GK	1909–1913	127	0	169	0		
Pally Hale	FB / HB	1925–1930	156	4	167	4		
John Finnigan	MF	1998–2002	143	3	166	4		
William Watson	FW	1903–1909	120	28	166	47		
Mitchell Downie	GK	1954–1959	157	0	164	0		
Richard Hood	FB / HB	1904–1909	130	1	164	1		
Matt Robson	HB	1909–1915	121	3	160	3		
Simon Yeo	FW	2002–2005; 2006	134	42	157	51		
Matt Carmichael	FW	1989–1993	133	18	156	21		
Alf Young	HB	1929–1934	147	5	154	5		
Ernie Whittle	FW	1950–1954	145	62	151	64		
Billy Simpson	FB / HB	1902–1907	140	0	151	0		
Gary Strodder	DF	1982–1987	132	6	151	6		
Jimmy Hartley	FW	1897–1903	138	52	150	56		
Barry Richardson	GK	1995–2000	131	0	150	0		
Tony Battersby	FW	1998–2002	130	21	150	26		
Kevin Austin	DF	1996–1999	129	1	148	1	Trinidad and Tobago	
Tony Cunningham	FW	1979–1982	123	32	148	42		
Timothy Eyoma *	DF	2020–present	113	5	148	5	England U19	(Note: Tottenham Hotspur)
Dean West	DF	1991–1995; 2004	123	20	147	23		
Paddy McConville	FB	1925–1932	138	0	145	0		
Yaffer Ward	FB	1915–1923; 1925–1926; 1930	108	10	145	12		(Note: The Lincoln City FC Archive omits appearances and goals from the 1920–21 Midland League season from the totals on individual player pages. Totals for affected players are amended using the Season Stats dropdown menu at the bottom right of each player's individual page.)
Alf Webb	GK	1899–1904	131	0	144	0		
Will Gibson	HB	1898–1903	130	1	143	1		
Richard Butcher	MF	2002–2005; 2005; 2009–2010	124	12	143	14		(Note: Oldham Athletic)
Ben Futcher	DF	2002–2005	121	13	142	16		
John Fleming	MF	1975–1979	121	17	141	18		
Alf Ball	FW	1913–1921	97	13	141	23		
Neal Eardley	DF	2017–2020	122	3	140	3	Wales	
Colin Alcide	FW	1995–1999	121	27	140	31		
Arthur Atkin	FB / HB	1913–1924	96	2	140	3		
Quentin Neill	FB	1888–1894	59	0	139	3		
Luke Waterfall	DF	2015–2018	31	2	137	16		
Billy Dinsdale	FW	1926–1931	126	89	136	103		
Lasse Sørensen *	MF	2021–present	115	8	136	10	Denmark U20	
Russell Green	HB	1957–1963	125	8	135	8		
Freddy Simpson	FW	1902–1908	124	37	133	39		
Dennis O'Donnell	FW	1901–1905	118	31	133	37		
Adam Jackson *	DF	2020–present	116	3	133	3	England U19	
Gordon Hughes	MF	1968–1971	117	9	131	9		
Paul Miller	MF	1997–2001	116	11	131	12		
Regan Poole	DF	2021–2023	111	3	131	4	Wales U21	
Tom Maidment	FW	1926–1931	126	43	130	47		
John McClelland	FW	1958–1961	121	32	130	34		
Paul Green	DF	2007–2011	117	4	130	4		
Jack Manning	FW	1911–1915	90	9	130	20		
Tom Miller	MF	2012–2015	0	0	129	11		(Note: Newport County)
James Smith	FB	1931–1936	116	3	127	3		
Mick Harford	FW	1977–1980	115	41	126	46	England	
Michael Bostwick	MF	2016–2020	107	1	125	10	England C	
Jamie McCombe	DF	2004–2006; 2016–2018	87	7	125	11		
Darren Davis	DF	1988–1991; 1995	105	4	124	7	England youth	
Derek Trevis	MF	1970–1973	108	18	123	21		
John Irving	FW	1889–1897	51	10	123	43		
Jack Kendall	GK	1922–1924; 1928–1930	117	0	122	0		
Dickie Deacon	FW	1936–1939	111	22	121	25		
John Milner	HB	1963–1966	109	6	121	7		
Jon Whitney	DF	1995–1998	101	8	121	11		
Frank Pegg	FW	1926–1931	115	51	120	51		
Tom Brooks	DF	1965–1971	113	1	120	1		
Ben Sedgemore	MF	2001–2004	107	5	120	6	English schools	
Gary West	DF	1985–1987; 1991; 1991–1992	104	5	120	6	England youth	(Note: Port Vale)
Bob Fenwick	FW	1920–1926	76	2	120	5		
Frank Smallman	FW	1889–1896	58	23	120	53		
Harry Parr	FW	1946–1950	112	13	118	13	England amateur	
Jack Bryan	HB	1919–1922	75	1	117	2		
Bob Meacock	HB	1935–1938	106	0	116	0		
Brendan Guest	DF	1976–1980	104	2	116	2	England youth	
Francis Green	FW	2003–2006	100	18	116	20		
Gavin Gordon	FW	1997–2000	99	30	115	33		
Andy York	FB	1927–1930	106	6	114	6		
Neil Redfearn	MF	1984–1986	100	13	114	14		
Brian Heward	DF	1961–1966	97	2	114	2		
Fred Corbett	FB	1936–1939	103	0	113	0		
Tony Lormor	FW	1990–1994	100	30	113	34		
Alex Woodyard	MF	2016–2018	46	2	113	3	England C	
Charlie Bannister	HB	1897–1901	106	1	112	1		
Teddy Bishop *	MF	2021–present	94	11	112	15		
Mark Bailey	DF	2001–2004	98	1	111	4		
Matthew Bloomer	DF	2002–2006	94	3	110	4		
Bertie Foster	FW	1906–1912	67	1	110	9		
David Johnson	FW	1993–1996	88	13	109	23		
George Stillyards	DF	1945–1949	100	2	109	2		
Terry Branston	DF	1970–1973	100	1	109	1		
James Saunders	GK	1906–1909	65	0	109	0		
Dick Young	DF	1949–1954	100	2	106	3		
Jason Lee	FW	1991–1993	93	21	106	22		
Anthony Scully	FW	2020–2022	85	25	106	37	England U16; Republic of Ireland U21	
George Nisbet	HB	1906–1909	62	1	104	2		
Phil Brown	MF	1987–1990	43	3	104	24		
Jake Sheridan	MF	2011–2012; 2012–2014	0	0	104	4		(Note: Tamworth)
Dixie McNeil	FW	1972–1974	97	53	103	53		
Don Dykes	HB	1949–1958	95	4	101	4		
Jamie Forrester	FW	2006–2008	90	35	101	37	England U18	
Simon Weaver	DF	2002–2004	88	4	101	5		
Derek Bell	FW	1979–1983	83	33	101	40		
Conor McGrandles	MF	2020–2022; 2024	83	6	101	6		(Note: Charlton Athletic)
Gordon Simmonite	DF	1982–1985; 1987–1988	72	0	101	0	England C	
Ted Savage	HB	1929–1931	96	3	100	3		
Rod Fletcher	FW	1967–1971	92	29	100	31		
Rob Burch	GK	2008–2010	92	0	100	0	England U20	
Mark Wallington	GK	1988–1991	87	0	100	0	England U23	
Danny Hone	DF	2007–2011	85	3	100	4		
Tom Hopper	FW	2020–2023	83	14	100	22		

== See also ==
- List of Lincoln City F.C. players (25–99 appearances)

== Footnotes ==
Player statistics include games played while on loan from:
