= History of Lincoln City F.C. =

History of an English football club

Founded in 1884, Lincoln City F.C. won the Midland League in 1889–90, their first full season playing league football. They moved on from the Football Alliance to become founder members of the Football League Second Division in 1892, remaining there until they failed re-election in 1908. They won immediate re-election after winning the next year's Midland League, and would repeat this feat after failing re-election again in 1911 and 1920. Founder members of the Football League Third Division North in 1921, they won promotion as champions in 1931–32, but were relegated two seasons later. Crowned Third Division North champions again in 1947–48, they were relegated the next year, but would remain in the second tier for nine seasons after again winning the Third Division North title in 1951–52. Two successive relegations left them in the Fourth Division by 1962, where they would remain until Graham Taylor's title winning campaign of 1975–76.

Chart of table positions of Lincoln City in the Football League.

Relegated in 1978–79, they secured promotion again two years later but suffered a double relegation to find themselves in the Conference by 1987. Lincoln made an immediate recovery however, regaining their Football League status with the Conference title in 1987–88. They were promoted again in 1997–98, but were relegated the next season. They reached the play-offs in five consecutive seasons, from 2002 to 2007, losing in the final twice (2002–03 and 2004–05) and the semi-finals three times, which is a competition record. However they exited the division at the other end when they were returned to the Conference after relegation at the end of the 2010–11 campaign. A six-season stay in non-league was ended when Cowley brothers Nicky and Danny led the club to the National League title in 2016–17, as well as a run to the quarter-finals of the FA Cup – The 2016–17 FA Cup run was transformative: Lincoln, then non-league, beat Burnley (a Premier League club) to reach the quarter-finals - this made them the first non-league side to reach that stage in 103 years. Though they lost in the League Two play-offs the next year, they did win the 2018 EFL Trophy Final. In the 2018–2019 season they were champions of League Two and gained promotion to the third tier for the first time in 20 years.

== Origins and early years ==
Football in the city of Lincoln had been prominent since the 1860s although not strictly connected to the modern day club. After the disbanding of Lincoln Rovers (formerly Lincoln Recreation) in 1884, Lincoln City FC was formed as an amateur association, turning professional in the 1891–92 season. Originally they played at the John O'Gaunts ground (provided by wealthy local brewer Robert Dawber) before moving in 1895 to their current ground, Sincil Bank.

The first game Lincoln played as an amateur team was an emphatic 9–1 victory over local rivals Sleaford, on 4 October 1884. George Hallam set two records for the club that day: he scored the first ever goal for the club, and also the first ever hat-trick. Their first competitive game at home also ended in an emphatic manner, beating Boston Excelsior 11–0, with Edwin Teesdale scoring four goals.

At this time, before the club gained entry into the Football League and professional status, the County Cup was their main priority; Lincoln won it for the first time in the 1886–87 season with a 2–0 replay victory over neighbours Grimsby Town, after the initial match had finished 2–2.

Lincoln soon helped to form what was then the Second Division in 1892–93 season, as an increasing number of clubs wished to join the Football League. Their first game in the Football League was a 4–2 away defeat to Sheffield United on 3 September 1892. Their first home game was also against Sheffield United, this time, however, Lincoln won 1–0. The first game at Sincil Bank in 1895, after moving from the John O'Gaunts Ground due to Dawber's death, was a 0–0 friendly draw with local rivals, Gainsborough Trinity. The first competitive fixture at the ground was against Arsenal, the game ended 1–1.

In January 1907 The Imps knocked Chelsea out of the FA Cup after a replay. Managed by David Calderhead, two late goals salvaged a home draw in the first leg. In the replay in London, an injury time goal by Norrie Fairgray took Lincoln through. Chelsea returned at the end of the season to poach Calderhead to become their manager.

== Interwar era ==
Up until the 1920s Lincoln spent most of their time swinging between the Second Division and the more localised leagues, the Midland and also the Central league. After then, however, in the 1921–22 season, Lincoln, along with several other clubs from the Central and Midland leagues, founded the Third Division (North). Lincoln were promoted to the Second Division in 1931–32, only to be relegated back to the Third Division (North) the next season.

== Post-WWII era ==
Lincoln were promoted to the Second Division in and 1947–48, only to be relegated back to the Third Division the next season. They were promoted again in 1951–52, and remained in the second division for eight years until they suffered back-to-back relegations in 1960–61 and 1961–62 to the Fourth Division.

== 1975–1985 ==
It was the 1975–76, when they were managed by future England manager Graham Taylor, season where the club won the Division 4 title and broke the record for most points for a whole season when 2 instead of 3 points were awarded for a win with 74 points in total (this was and still is the record number of points achieved under the 2-point system); the record of winning the most games (32) and losing the fewest (4), was also set. City also become the first club in nearly a decade to score over 100 league goals (111 in total). They also won 21 out of 23 home league games in this season (the other 2 were drawn) and also won 11 games away from home, another impressive bout from the club. It was the season where, Graham Taylor recalls, "teams were petrified of coming to Sincil Bank".

In 1982 and again in 1983, Lincoln narrowly missed out on promotion to the Second Division. In 1985, Lincoln were the opposition at Bradford City when the Bradford City stadium fire claimed the lives of 56 spectators – two of them, Bill Stacey and Jim West, were Lincoln fans, and subsequently these fans had the Stacey-West stand named after them.

== 1986–2000 ==
Lincoln were relegated on the last day of the following season, and the year after that they became the first team to suffer automatic relegation from the Football League. This was a dramatic decline for a club who had almost reached the Second Division four years earlier and has been linked to the trauma arising from the disaster. This marked the fourth occasion on which Lincoln were demoted from the Football League, a record that still stands. They regained their Football League place automatically via promotion as champions of the Conference (beforehand it was done by re-election) at the first attempt with a long ball game devised by eccentric manager Colin Murphy and held on to it until the end of season 2010–11. On 8 September 1990, Lincoln were the opposition when David Longhurst suffered a fatal heart attack during the first half of a game against York City at Bootham Crescent. The game was abandoned at half-time.

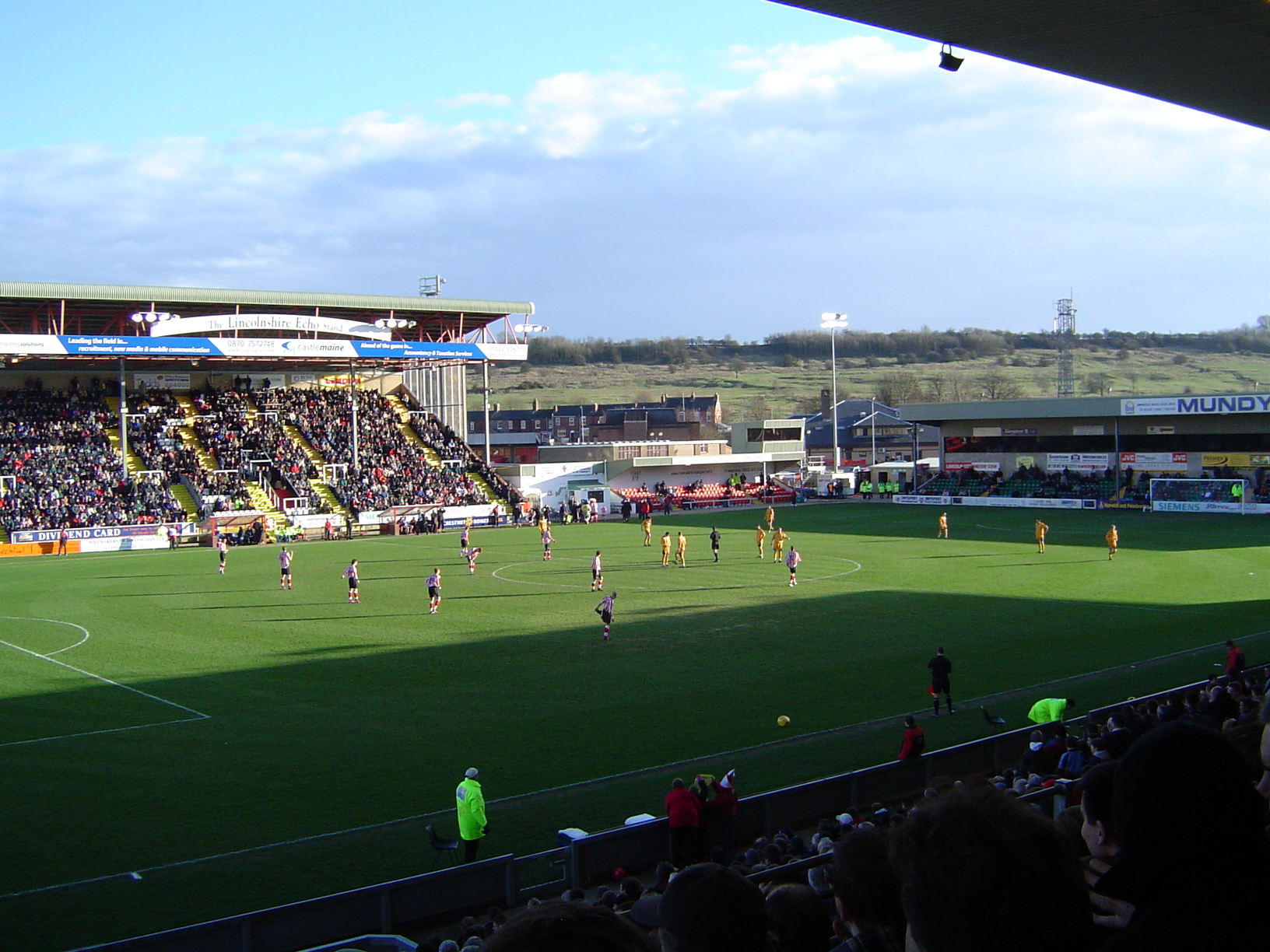
The Lincolnshire derby, between Lincoln City and local rivals Boston United, being played at Sincil Bank

== Into the new millennium ==
With Lincoln entering administration at the end of the 2001–02 season, Alan Buckley was relieved of his duties as manager on financial grounds with Keith Alexander placed in charge of all football matters. On 3 May 2002 Lincoln successfully petitioned to go into administration but the financial crisis would leave the first team squad bereft of players as the day saw five senior players – Jason Barnett, Grant Brown, David Cameron, Steve Holmes and Justin Walker – released at the end of their contracts with a sixth, Lee Thorpe, departing for Leyton Orient. A hectic day finished with confirmation of Alexander's official appointment as team manager.

In 2002–03, Alexander was given the task of keeping the team in the football league; he proved the many pundits and fans who believed that Lincoln would be relegated and sent out of business due to financial irregularities wrong. With a team made up of cheap ex-non-league players and the lower paid members of the previous season's squad, he took them to the play-off final which they lost 5–2 to Bournemouth. The team was rewarded with a civil reception in Lincoln, and an open-top bus ride through Lincoln, an event usually reserved for the winners of such competitions; it was awarded to the team because of the massive achievement.

In 2003–04 Alexander again confounded the critics by coaching the Imps to another play-off position, this time losing to eventual winners Huddersfield Town in the semi-finals. Alexander, one of the very few black managers in the Football League, had a very serious brain injury (a cerebral aneurysm) halfway through the season, but made a full recovery. In the 2004–05 season they again qualified for the play-offs, for the third year running, and in the semi-finals Lincoln beat Macclesfield Town 2–1 on aggregate over two legs but lost in the final against Southend United 2–0 after extra time.

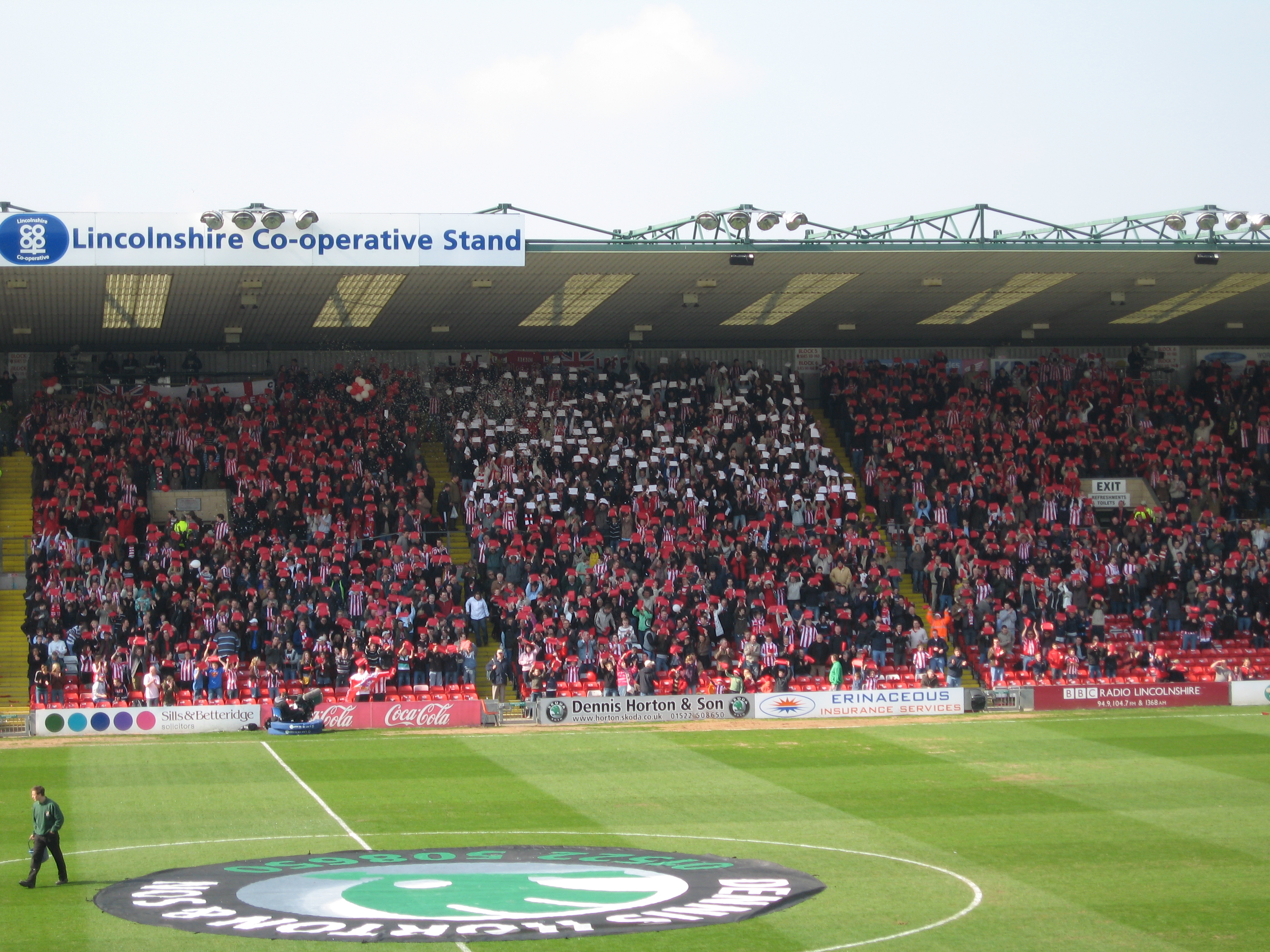
Lincoln fans do a card display before a match against Swindon

In the 2005–06 season, Lincoln City lost narrowly to then Premier League side Fulham in the second round of the 2005–06 League Cup, taking the match to extra-time before the London side won 5–4 in the final minute. In the league, Lincoln again reached the play-offs after many fans and critics believed that they would finish in the mid-table after losing many of their first team regulars from the previous three campaigns. In January both Alexander and former assistant manager Gary Simpson were put on gardening leave by the board. Alexander was soon after reinstated; however, Simpson did not return. Shortly after, over a disagreement with other board members over the way the club was being run and certain personnel, two prominent board members, Ray Trew and Keith Roe departed from the club. Lincoln brushed this saga to the side though, and finished 7th in League 2 after only losing 3 games since the new year. Lincoln were to face local neighbours Grimsby Town in the play-offs, a side they had beaten 5–0 at Sincil Bank earlier in the season. However, once again it was not to be, as Lincoln lost 3–1 on aggregate to become the first team ever to lose four consecutive play-off competitions.

After speculation that he would take up the vacant managerial role at Peterborough United, Keith Alexander left his position as manager of Lincoln City by mutual consent on 24 May 2006, stating that he could take the club no further, and shortly after on 15 June John Schofield was appointed his successor, with John Deehan as Director of Football. When John Deehan was the Director of Football, the club enjoyed a close link with Premier League outfit Aston Villa. As well as Villa hosting a behind closed-doors friendly with City earlier in the 2006–07 season, Paul Green, a promising youngster, made a permanent move to the club, whilst goalkeeper Bobby Olejnik featured several times on the substitute bench during his loan spell at City. Deehan also brought in Ryan Amoo, a youth player who he worked with at Villa, who has since left the club since his contract expired. For the fifth year in a row, under a different manager, however, Lincoln City reached the League Two play-offs after finishing 5th in the league (the highest position that they have qualified for the play-offs in). Once again, however, they lost, this time to Bristol Rovers in the semi-finals courtesy of a 2–1 defeat away and a 3–5 defeat at home. The failure to succeed in five successive play-off competitions is a record for any club.

The team started the 2007–08 campaign poorly, managing just two wins before a winless streak that lasted from 25 August to 24 November. During this winless streak the managerial team of John Schofield and John Deehan were sacked, and replaced with former Huddersfield Town manager Peter Jackson. Jackson quickly earned the nickname "Lord of the Imps" due to his shared name with Peter Jackson, the director who made the Lord of the Rings films. Jackson parted company with the club on 2 September 2009 due to poor home form in the previous season and a poor start to the 2009/10 season.

On 28 September 2009, the Lincoln hotseat was handed to former Chelsea, Blackburn Rovers, Celtic and England striker Chris Sutton. His assistant was named as Ian Pearce, another former Premier League player. The club had been managed by coach Simon Clark following the sacking of Peter Jackson and his assistant Iffy Onuora. It was announced that Sutton would take the reins from Clark on 30 September. Sutton led Lincoln City to the third round of the FA Cup, after beating Northwich Victoria in a second-round game televised live on ITV1. City were drawn with Premier League side Bolton Wanderers in the third round. The tie was played on 2 January 2010 at the Reebok Stadium, with Lincoln losing the game 4–0 and crashing out respectfully to the Premier League side. League form improved in January, with the team profiting from new loan and permanent signings. Loan signing Davide Somma became an instant hero, scoring 9 goals in his 14 games on loan and ending up being Lincoln's top goalscorer for the season.

Sutton resigned in September 2010, citing personal reasons. However, he later revealed it was due to disagreements over spending with the club's board. On 15 October, the Imps hired Steve Tilson as the club's new manager. Under new management, things looked up for the Imps and by Christmas, Tilson's side were 11th. The good run ended abruptly, and Lincoln started to slip down the table. After a run of nine losses and a draw in the final ten games, Lincoln City were relegated from League Two on the last day of the end of the 2010–2011 season. They needed a win in their final game against Aldershot Town to survive, but lost 3–0. With relegation rivals Barnet winning their final game, Lincoln finished 23rd and were relegated. Almost 8,000 supporters watched the game.

== In the Conference ==
Following relegation to the Conference Premier, Tilson released all but three members of the squad, telling them they had no future at Sincil Bank. By early October, Lincoln were one point above the relegation zone and the management were coming under fire after a run of one win in four; Tilson was sacked as manager on 10 October 2011 following a 4–0 defeat at Tamworth. Following the duo's sacking, Grant Brown was put in temporary charge.

Brown remained in charge for four games, winning the first but none of the subsequent three, before former Mansfield Town manager David Holdsworth was confirmed as manager. Holdsworth managed the Imps to safety but only by 8 points; furthermore, Lincoln lost to Isthmian League outfit Carshalton Athletic in the FA Trophy and suffered its earliest FA Cup exit since 1924–25.

Lincoln were one game away from facing Liverpool in the FA Cup third round the following season, but were denied by a second round replay defeat to Mansfield Town. On 17 February 2013, David Holdsworth left the club by mutual consent following twelve games without a win. On 27 February 2013, Gary Simpson, a former assistant of Keith Alexander during his time at the club, was appointed manager until the end of the season. Safety was secured on the final day with a 5–1 away win against Hyde.

After a good start to the 2013–14 season, Lincoln went on a run of just two wins in seventeen games, which saw the Imps embroiled in relegation trouble once more. From the start of February to the end of the season, Lincoln lost just three games, and finished 14th in the league, their best placing since relegation. Gary Simpson was placed on gardening leave on 3 November 2014. Assistant manager Chris Moyses was placed in temporary charge and then appointed permanently on 8 December 2014. Lincoln finished 15th that season. 2015–16 would prove to be largely a season of mid-table stability, eventually culminating in a 13th-place finish. Just before the season ended, Moyses announced that he would leave the club in order to focus on his business interests outside of football, and was subsequently replaced by Braintree Town manager Danny Cowley.

City started the 2016–17 season with mixed form, winning two and losing two of their opening four games. This was followed by a run of victories that resulted in the Imps sitting top of the table after a victory at Tranmere, the first time the club had topped any table in ten years. The form again dipped with defeats to Dover and Barrow in late September, but that would be the last time that the Imps would taste defeat in any competition until a last minute defeat to Guiseley on Boxing Day. During that run the Imps travelled to run-away leaders Forest Green and would have fallen twelve points behind with a defeat, but three goals in the final 30 minutes turned around a 2–0 deficit.

The good form continued into the New Year as the Imps gradually started to pull clear of the group. Despite a bit of a dip of form in March, Cowley would go on to lead the Imps to a National League title and a return to League Two for the first time since their relegation six years earlier. The club ended their second spell in non-league with draws against Maidstone and Southport, the latter of whom were the club's first opponents back in non-league, bringing it full circle.

In the 2016–17 FA Cup, Lincoln beat Championship side Ipswich Town, in a replay, after progressing past Guiseley, Altrincham and Oldham Athletic, before defeating Championship leaders Brighton and Hove Albion at Sincil Bank to make the fifth round of the FA cup for the first time since the end of the Victorian era. On 18 February, Lincoln went on to beat top flight side Burnley 1–0 to historically go through to the FA Cup quarter final, the first time a non-league club had progressed to the last eight since 1914. In the quarter-finals, they were defeated 5–0 at Arsenal.

== Return to the Football League ==
In the 2017–18 season, on 6 February 2018, Lincoln beat Chelsea U21s in the semi-final of the 2017–18 EFL Trophy, taking them to Wembley Stadium for the first time in the 134 years of the club. They went on to win the final against Shrewsbury Town on 8 April 2018. The winning goal was scored by Elliot Whitehouse in the 16th minute and was the only goal of the match. on 12 May, Lincoln drew 0–0 with Exeter City in the first leg of the play-off semi-final. In the second leg, on 17 May, Lincoln lost 3–1.

In the 2018–19 season, on 5 April 2019, Lincoln announced that Nettleham Ladies FC would be rebranded as Lincoln City Women from 1 June. Lincoln won League Two, on 22 April 2019, after a 0–0 draw against Tranmere Rovers, having been top of the table since 25 August 2018. Promotion from League Two represented Lincoln's first season in the EFL League One since the 1998–99 campaign.

Lincoln began their first season in the third tier in over twenty years with relative success, victorious in their first three games against Accrington Stanley, Rotherham and Southend. On 9 September 2019, the team's then manager, Danny Cowley, announced his departure to join Championship side Huddersfield Town, having guided Lincoln to two promotions in his previous three seasons alongside brother and assistant manager Nicky.

In the 2022–23 EFL Cup, Lincoln equalled a club record performance by reaching the fourth round of the tournament, losing 2–1 to Southampton. After leading Lincoln to a top-half finish in 2022–23 season, Lincoln parted company with Mark Kennedy with the Imps in 16th place.
