= Jeffery Smith =

Jeffery Smith is the name of

- Jeffery Smith (athlete) (born 1943), Zambian sprinter
- Jeffery Smith (musician) (1955-2012), American jazz singer

== See also ==
- Jeff Smith (disambiguation)
- Geoff Smith (disambiguation)
- Geoffrey Smith (disambiguation)
- Jefferson Smith (disambiguation)
