= Billy Bean (disambiguation) =

Billy Bean (1964–2024) was an American baseball player who publicly came out as gay.

Billy Bean or Billy Beane may also refer to:

- Billy Bean (musician) (1933–2012), American jazz guitarist
- Billy Bean (footballer) (1915–1993), born Alfred Samuel Bean, English footballer
- Billy Beane (born 1962), Oakland Athletics general manager and former baseball player
- Billy Bean, puppet character in 1950s UK children's TV series Billy Bean and His Funny Machine

== See also ==
- Bill Beaney (born 1951), American ice hockey coach
- Billy McBean (1889–1976), Australian-rules football player
- Willie Bean, a dog
- William Bean (disambiguation)
