= Harry Troops =

English footballer

Personal information
- Full name: Harold Troops
- Date of birth: 10 February 1926
- Place of birth: Sheffield, England
- Date of death: 5 March 1963 (aged 37)
- Place of death: Sheffield, England
- Positions: Outside forward; full back

Senior career*
Years	Team	Apps	(Gls)
–	Hadfield Works		
1948–1949	Barnsley	3	(1)
1949–1958	Lincoln City	295	(32)
1958–1960	Carlisle United	60	(1)
Total		358	(34)
- * Club domestic league appearances and goals

Harold "Harry" Troops (10 February 1926 – 5 March 1963) was an English professional footballer who scored 34 goals from 358 appearances in the Football League playing for Barnsley, Lincoln City and Carlisle United.

== Life and career ==
Troops was born in Sheffield, Yorkshire, and began his football career with Barnsley. He played three games in the Second Division for Barnsley, scoring once, before joining Lincoln City in 1949. He played at outside right for his first few seasons with Lincoln, and was ever-present in both 1950–51 and 1951–52, when he contributed to the club's Third Division North title. The 1951–52 forward line – Troops, Johnny Garvie, Andy Graver, Ernie Whittle and Roy Finch – scored more goals than any other league club's forwards that season. In the later part of his career, he played at full back. He left the club in 1958, having scored 35 goals from 310 games in all senior competitions, a total which at the time placed him sixth in Lincoln's all-time appearances list. Troops finished his career with two seasons at Carlisle United, whom he joined for a £2,000 fee.

After his retirement from football, Troops worked in a steelworks. He died in a road accident in Sheffield in 1963 at the age of 37.

== Honours ==
Lincoln City

- Third Division North: 1951–52
