= Roy Finch (footballer) =

Welsh footballer (1922-2007)

Personal information
- Full name: Roy Finch
- Date of birth: 7 April 1922
- Place of birth: Barry, Wales
- Date of death: 14 August 2007 (aged 85)
- Position: Outside forward

Senior career*
Years	Team	Apps	(Gls)
1939–1944	Swansea Town	0	(0)
1946–1949	West Bromwich Albion	15	(1)
1949–1958	Lincoln City	275	(56)
Total		290	(57)
- * Club domestic league appearances and goals

Roy Finch (7 April 1922 – 14 August 2007) was a Welsh professional footballer who scored 57 goals from 290 appearances in the Football League playing for West Bromwich Albion and Lincoln City.

== Life and career ==
Finch was born in Barry, Vale of Glamorgan, Wales, one of five children. He attended Gladstone School in the town, and played for the Barry Schools football team. He signed for Swansea Town just before the Second World War. During the war, he made guest appearances for clubs including Luton Town while serving as an aircraft fitter in the Royal Air Force. After the war, he spent two and a half years with West Bromwich Albion, but played infrequently, so in February 1949, he joined Second Division club Lincoln City for a £3,000 fee.

The circumstances of the move made the front page of the newspapers. The transfer was agreed while Finch was at his family home in Wales, which had no telephone. Because Lincoln needed him to play in a match the next day, they chartered a plane to fly him from Cardiff Airport to Southampton for the match, and asked the local police to visit Finch's home to give him the news. Lincoln lost 4–0.

Finch played at outside right for his first few seasons with Lincoln, and was ever-present in both 1950–51 and 1951–52, when he contributed to the club's Third Division North title. That season's forward line – Harry Troops, Johnny Garvie, Andy Graver, Ernie Whittle and Finch – scored more goals than any other league club's forwards. In the later part of his career he played at full back. He played his last game for the club in 1958, having scored 58 goals from 291 games in all senior competitions, a total which at the time placed him seventh in Lincoln's all-time appearances list.

Finch ran a newsagent's shop in Lincoln after his retirement from professional football, and later worked as a van driver for a bakery. Away from work, he enjoyed painting and golf. He was twice married, and had three sons with his first wife. Finch died in 2007 at the age of 85.
