= George Peden =

George Peden may refer to:

- George Peden (footballer) (George Wright Watson Peden, born 1943), Scottish footballer
- G. C. Peden (George C. Peden, born 1943), Scottish historian
