= Senator Vaughan =

Senator Vaughan or Vaughn may refer to:

- Don Vaughan (politician) (born 1952), North Carolina State Senate
- Horace Worth Vaughan (1867–1922), Texas State Senate
- Jackie Vaughn III (1917–2006), Michigan State Senate
- Lewis R. Vaughn (born 1938), South Carolina State Senate
