= Andy Flynn =

Andy Flynn may refer to:

- Andy Flynn (footballer) (1895–?), English professional footballer
- Andy Flynn (EastEnders), fictional character from EastEnders
- Andy Flynn (The Closer), fictional character from The Closer
