= Jim Grummett =

Jim or Jimmy Grummett may refer to:

- Jim Grummett Sr. (1918–1996), English footballer for Lincoln City and Accrington Stanley in the 1940s and 1950s
- Jim Grummett Jr. (born 1945), English footballer for Lincoln City, Denver Dynamos, and other clubs in the 1960s and 1970s
