= William Bean (disambiguation) =

William Bean (1721–1782) was one of the first permanent settlers in Tennessee.

William Bean may also refer to:

- William Bean (geologist) (1787–1866), English geologist and conchologist
- William Bean (born 1843), Australian businessman and politician, the oldest of Bean Brothers
- William Jackson Bean (1863–1947), British botanist
- William Hopper Bean, miller of Chillenden Windmill in 1882–1899
- William George Bean, British businessman, founded Blackpool Pleasure Beach in 1896
- William Bennett Bean (1909–1989), American medical writer

== See also ==
- Billy Bean (disambiguation)
- Willie Bean, a dog
- William McBean (1818–1878), Scottish soldier
