= Grumet =

Grumet is a surname. Notable people with the surname include:

- F. Carl Grumet (1937–2015), American physician and scientist
- Jacob B. Grumet (1900–1987), American lawyer and judge
- Madeleine Grumet (born 1940), American academic in curriculum theory and feminist theory

== See also ==
- Grummett
