= Dan McPhail =

Scottish footballer

Personal information
- Full name: Daniel McPhail
- Date of birth: 9 February 1903
- Place of birth: Campbeltown, Scotland
- Date of death: October 1987 (aged 84)
- Place of death: Lincoln, England
- Height: 5 ft 11 in (1.80 m)
- Position: Goalkeeper

Senior career*
Years	Team	Apps	(Gls)
- Falkirk
- Third Lanark
1922–1931	Portsmouth	128	(0)
1931–1939	Lincoln City	309	(0)
- * Club domestic league appearances and goals

Daniel McPhail (9 February 1903 – October 1987) was a Scottish professional footballer who made 437 appearances in the Football League playing for Portsmouth and Lincoln City. He played as a goalkeeper. Before moving to England he played for Falkirk and Third Lanark in Scotland.

== Life and career ==
McPhail was born in Campbeltown, Argyll. He played football for his grammar school team before joining Falkirk and appearing as a triallist for Third Lanark. He moved to England in January 1922 to sign for Portsmouth, then competing in the Third Division South. He made his debut at the end of the 1922–23 Football League season, and took over as Portsmouth's first-choice goalkeeper in October 1925, by which time the club was playing in the Second Division. They gained promotion to the First Division in 1926–27, and McPhail played regularly, keeping seven consecutive clean sheets in the second half of the 1927–28 season to help avoid relegation. He retained his place, despite conceding ten goals against Leicester City in what remains, as of 2012, Portsmouth's record league defeat, until breaking his wrist in October 1928. Although he remained with the club for another two and a half years, he was unable to dislodge Jock Gilfillan from the starting eleven. Ahead of the 1930–31 season, the Daily Mirror wrote that "Gilfillan's goalkeeping was so satisfactory last season that he was never disturbed from his position and was the only ever-present on the club's books. If he had had to stand down McPhail was at hand, but the brilliant Scot never had one chance."

McPhail joined Third Division North club Lincoln City in the 1931 close season, as what the Daily Express expected to be "an efficient substitute" for Jimmy Maidment, who had just signed for Notts County; Maidment's brother Tom went to Portsmouth in exchange, together with what was described as a small fee. McPhail went straight into the starting eleven, and was ever-present as Lincoln won the 1931–32 Northern Section title. On Boxing Day 1933, he was sent off for striking the opposing centre-forward, Tom Nolan of Port Vale, who had barged into him while he was holding the ball. It transpired that the case was one of mistaken identity. The referee saw McPhail bent over the unconscious Nolan and assumed him to be to blame, but the offending blow had in fact been struck by Lincoln's Alf Young in an off-the-ball incident. In the next match, McPhail suffered a dislocated elbow, an injury that forced his absence from a competitive match for the first time since signing for the club. When he returned to action, he kept his place until near the end of the 1938–39 season, rarely missing a game. His final tally of 309 Football League appearances was at the time a club appearance record for players in any position, and the record for appearances by a goalkeeper lasted until 2007, when it was broken by Alan Marriott.

After he retired from football, McPhail became a bookmaker in Lincoln. He died in Lincoln in October 1987 at the age of 84.
