= George Greaves =

George Greaves may refer to:

- George Greaves (footballer)
- George Greaves (British Army officer)
