= Arthur Atkins =

Arthur Atkins may refer to:

- Arthur Atkins (painter) (1873–1899), tonalist landscape painter
- Arthur Atkins (footballer) (1925–1988), English footballer

== See also ==
- Arthur Atkin (1893–1952), English footballer
