= Geoff Smith =

Geoff Smith may refer to:

- Geoff Smith (music composer) (born 1966), English composer, academic and vice chancellor of Regent's University London
- Geoff Smith (footballer, born 1928) (1928–2013), English footballer
- Geoff Smith (politician) (born 1934), former Australian politician
- Geoff Smith (Essex cricketer) (born 1935), former English cricketer
- Geoff Smith (Kent cricketer) (1925–2016), English amateur cricketer
- Geoff Smith (New Zealand cricketer) (born 1953), cricketer for Canterbury
- Geoff Smith (cyclist) (1942–2018), Australian Olympic cyclist
- Geoff Smith (decathlete) (born 1945), Australian decathlete
- Geoff Smith (Australian footballer) (born 1948), Australian rules footballer
- Geoff Smith (runner) (born 1953), British marathon runner
- Geoff Smith (mathematician) (born 1953), former leader of the United Kingdom International Mathematical Olympiad team
- Geoff Smith (businessman) (born 1955), Canadian businessman
- Geoff Smith (British musician) (born 1961), English musician
- Geoff Smith (ice hockey) (born 1969), former National Hockey League defenceman

== See also ==
- Geoffrey Smith (disambiguation)
- Jeff Smith (disambiguation)
