= Dave Smith (footballer, born 1947) =

English footballer (1947–2022)

Personal information
- Date of birth: 8 December 1947
- Place of birth: Thornaby-on-Tees, England
- Date of death: September 2022 (aged 74)
- Positions: Outside left; left midfielder

Youth career
- Manchester United
- Middlesbrough

Senior career*
| Years | Team | Apps | (Gls) |
| 1964–1968 | Middlesbrough | 2 | (0) |
| 1968–1978 | Lincoln City | 371 | (52) |
| 1978–1980 | Rotherham United | 33 | (3) |
- * Club domestic league appearances and goals

David Smith (8 December 1947 – September 2022) was an English professional footballer who scored 55 goals from 406 games in the Football League playing as an outside left or left midfielder for Middlesbrough, Lincoln City and Rotherham United.

== Career ==
Smith was born in Thornaby-on-Tees, Yorkshire on 8 December 1947. An England schoolboy international, he began his career on Manchester United's books, but signed for Middlesbrough as an apprentice and then as a professional. He played only three times for that club in four seasons, and joined Lincoln City in 1968. He went straight into the first team, finished the 1968–69 season as the club's top scorer with 11 goals, and remained a first-choice player for ten years. He missed only one game as Lincoln won the Fourth Division title in the 1975–76 season, and scored their 100th goal of that season. Released in 1978 after playing more than 400 games for the club, a total which placed him third behind only Grant Brown and Tony Emery in the club's all-time appearance list, he finished his professional career with 43 appearances for Rotherham United, then played and coached in Sunday league football for many years.

After retiring as a footballer, Smith had several different jobs, including running a pub, working on an oil rig, factory work and selling insurance. Smith died in September 2022, at the age of 74.
