= Grummett =

Grummett is a surname. Notable people with the surname include:

- Bill Grummett (1891–1967), Canadian politician
- Jim Grummett (disambiguation), multiple people
- Tom Grummett (born 1959), Canadian comics artist and penciller
- Scott Grummett Food Photographer and Director

== See also ==
- Grimmett
- Grummet
