= Jeff Smith (footballer, born 1935) =

English footballer

Personal information
- Full name: Jeffrey Edward Smith
- Date of birth: 8 December 1935 (age 90)
- Place of birth: Chapeltown, England
- Position: Left back

Youth career
- –: Sheffield United

Senior career*
Years	Team	Apps	(Gls)
1953–1958	Sheffield United	10	(10)
1958–1967	Lincoln City	315	(2)
Total		316	(12)
- * Club domestic league appearances and goals

Jeffrey Edward "Jeff" Smith (born 8 December 1935) is an English former professional footballer who made 316 appearances in the Football League playing for Sheffield United and Lincoln City.

== Life and career ==
Smith was born in Chapeltown, Sheffield and began his football career as a junior with Sheffield United. He turned professional with that club, but played only once in the Second Division – in a 5–1 defeat to Liverpool at Anfield on 1 December 1956 – before moving on to Lincoln City, also a Second Division club, in February 1958.

He played regularly for Lincoln at left back, remaining with the club as they fell from the Second to the Fourth Division. When Lincoln were relegated to the Third Division in 1961, the Daily Mirror commented that there were "several talented players in the side – notably young inside right Roger Holmes and sound left back Jeff Smith". He was released in 1967, having scored twice from 351 games in all senior competitions, a total which at the time placed him second behind Tony Emery in Lincoln's all-time appearances list.
