= Fred Middleton =

English footballer

Personal information
- Full name: Frederick Thomas Middleton
- Date of birth: 2 August 1930
- Place of birth: West Hartlepool, England
- Date of death: 8 April 2016 (aged 85)
- Position: Wing half

Youth career
- Newcastle United

Senior career*
Years	Team	Apps	(Gls)
1948–1954	Newcastle United	0	(0)
1954–1963	Lincoln City	300	(16)
- Skegness Town
- * Club domestic league appearances and goals

Frederick Thomas Middleton (2 August 1930 – 8 April 2016) was an English professional footballer who made 300 appearances in the Football League playing for Lincoln City.

== Life and career ==
Middleton was born in West Hartlepool, County Durham, and attended the town's Technical Day School. He began his football career as a junior with Newcastle United, and spent several years there as a professional, but never played in the Football League before moving on to Lincoln City in 1954.

Middleton played regularly for Lincoln at wing half, remaining with the club as they fell from the Second to the Fourth Division. Middleton left the club in 1964, having scored 16 goals from 316 games in all competitions, a total which at the time placed him fifth in Lincoln's all-time appearances list.
