= William McMillan (footballer, born 1876) =

Scottish footballer

Personal information
- Full name: William McMillan
- Date of birth: 1876
- Place of birth: Scotland
- Date of death: February 1958 (aged 81–82)
- Positions: Right back; centre half

Senior career*
Years	Team	Apps	(Gls)
–	Lanark Athletic		
1898–1904	Lincoln City	176	(1)
1904–1906	Newark Town		
1906	Lincoln City	2	(0)
–	Newark Town		
–	Castleford Town		
–	Lincoln South End		
–	RAMC		
–	Waddington		
–	Boston Town		
- * Club domestic league appearances and goals

William McMillan (1876 – February 1958) was a Scottish professional footballer who made 178 appearances in the Football League playing for Lincoln City between 1898 and 1906. He played as a right back or centre half. He also played non-league football for clubs including Newark Town, Castleford Town and Boston Town.
