= George Greaves (footballer) =

English footballer

Personal information
- Full name: George Henry Greaves
- Date of birth: 20 June 1897
- Place of birth: Nottingham, England
- Height: 5 ft 8 in (1.73 m)
- Position: Full back

Senior career*
Years	Team	Apps	(Gls)
–	Lincoln Rovers		
–	Chesterfield Municipal		
1920–1924	Lincoln City	72	(0)
–	Scunthorpe & Lindsey United		
–	Boston Town		
- * Club domestic league appearances and goals

George Greaves (20 June 1897 – after 1924) was an English footballer who made 72 appearances in the Football League playing for Lincoln City. He played as a full back. He also played non-league football for Lincoln Rovers, Chesterfield Municipal, Scunthorpe & Lindsey United and Boston Town.

He played a leading role in Wigan Borough's record Football League victory, by nine goals to one. On 3 March 1923, Lincoln were losing 2–0 after half an hour of the visit to Wigan Borough when their goalkeeper, Jack Kendall, was knocked unconscious by the ball rebounding off the frame of the goal and striking him on the back of the head. Kendall was taken to hospital, and Greaves replaced him in goal; he and Lincoln conceded a further seven goals.
