= Dave Cameron (footballer) =

Welsh footballer and manager

Personal information
- Full name: David Anthony Cameron
- Date of birth: 24 August 1975 (age 51)
- Place of birth: Bangor, Wales
- Position: Striker

Senior career*
| Years | Team | Apps | (Gls) |
| 1994–1995 | Falkirk | 0 | (0) |
| 1995–1996 | East Stirlingshire | 8 | (0) |
| 1998–1999 | St Mirren | 10 | (2) |
| 1999–2000 | Brighton & Hove Albion | 17 | (0) |
| 2000 | Worthing | | |
| 2000–2002 | Lincoln City | 69 | (9) |
| 2002–2003 | Chester City | 15 | (2) |
| 2002 | → Droylsden (loan) | | |
| 2003 | → Telford United (loan) | 6 | (0) |
| 2003 | Tamworth | | |
| 2003–2004 | Halifax Town | 9 | (1) |
| 2004–2006 | Droylsden | | |
| 2006–2008 | Rhyl | 48 | (12) |
| 2008 | Bradford Park Avenue | 0 | (0) |

Managerial career
- 2008: Bradford Park Avenue
- * Club domestic league appearances and goals

David Anthony Cameron (born 24 August 1975) is a Welsh football manager and former professional footballer.

He played as a striker, notably in the Football League for Brighton & Hove Albion, Lincoln City and Chester City. He also played in Scotland for Falkirk, East Stirlingshire and St Mirren as well as spells in Non-league football with Worthing, Droylsden, Telford United, Tamworth and Halifax Town. He retired with Rhyl, but later had a spell as player/manager of Bradford Park Avenue.

== Playing career ==
Cameron began his career with local side Dunipace Juniors before moving to Falkirk. In the summer of 1995, he linked up with East Stirlingshire spending a season there before joining the Argyll and Sutherland Highlanders as a driver. He spent three years in the military, combining this career with appearances in the East of Scotland Football League with the likes of Pencaitland & Ormiston and Whitehill Welfare. In February 1999 he joined St Mirren where he scored twice in ten appearances.

Cameron paid £1,400 in the summer of 1999 to buy himself out of the Argyll and Sutherland Highlanders in order to join Brighton & Hove Albion on a two-year contract. However, he struggled with the initial demands on full-time football, particularly his fitness and weight levels. However, having been threatened with the axe by manager Micky Adams, he began to come into form particularly impressing in the 2–2 home draw with Lincoln City on 23 November 1999. Finding goals elusive, his final game for Brighton against Hull City on 5 February 2000 saw him substituted after just twenty minutes and then be the subject of severe criticism from Brighton's assistant manager Alan Cork who stated that "Cameron was useless, full stop. If he wants to be a professional footballer he has got to liven up. On that performance it will be a long time before he plays again." Cork's comments caused controversy in the local media and Brighton manager Micky Adams was forced to defend Cork. At the end of February, Cameron spent a week on trial with Raith Rovers before moving to Worthing at the end of March. He would mark his home debut in spectacular fashion, scoring five times against Barton Rovers on 11 April 2000. His form for Worthing attracted attention and Lincoln City, remembering his performance against them the previous November, invited Cameron to trial for them in Grant Brown's testimonial game against Middlesbrough in May 2000. An impressive performance saw Cameron secure a two-year contract with the Imps.

== Managerial career ==
He served as Bradford Park Avenue manager in 2008, helping the team to win the Northern Premier League Division One North and promotion to Northern Premier League Premier Division. However, he resigned in November 2008 after a defeat to bottom-place side Witton Albion. In March 2010 Cameron joined the coaching staff at Droylsden where he played for 2 years.

== Honours ==
=== Manager ===
Bradford Park Avenue

Northern Premier League Division One North: Champions 2007–08
