= Lewis R. Vaughn =

American politician

Member of the South Carolina Senate from the 5th district
- In office 2006-2009
- Preceded by: J. Verne Smith
- Succeeded by: Phillip Shoopman

Personal details
- Born: March 18, 1934 (age 92) Greenville, South Carolina
- Party: Republican
- Spouse: Lila Mae Waldrop
- Profession: Businessman

Lewis Raymond Vaughn is an American Republican politician. He was elected to the South Carolina Senate for the 5th district in 2006 to fulfill the unexpired term of J. Verne Smith, serving until 2009. Prior to this term, he served in the South Carolina House of Representatives for the 18th district from 1989 to 2006.
