= Jefferson Smith =

Jefferson Smith may refer to:

- Soapy Smith (Jefferson Randolph Smith II, 1860–1898), American con artist and gangster
- Jefferson Smith, the main character in the 1939 film Mr. Smith Goes to Washington, portrayed by James Stewart
- J. Verne Smith (1925–2006), American politician from South Carolina
- Jefferson Smith (politician) (born 1973), member of the Oregon House of Representatives and the founder of the Bus Project

== See also ==
- Jeff Smith (disambiguation)
