= Tosh Barrell =

English footballer (1888–1960)

Personal information
- Full name: George Barrell
- Date of birth: 7 July 1888
- Place of birth: Lincoln, England
- Date of death: 18 May 1960 (aged 71)
- Place of death: Leicester, England
- Height: 5 ft 9 in (1.75 m)
- Positions: Left half; forward

Senior career*
Years	Team	Apps	(Gls)
- Rustons Engineers
1908–1917	Lincoln City (Note: Lincoln City appearances and goals are in the Football League only, not the Midland or Central Leagues.)	141	(26)
- Rustons Engineers
- Boston Town
- * Club domestic league appearances and goals

George "Tosh" Barrell (7 July 1888 – 18 May 1960) was an English professional footballer who scored 26 goals from 141 appearances in the Football League playing for Lincoln City. He played at left half or as a forward.

Barrell was born in Lincoln. He played for the works team of Lincoln-based engine builders Ruston's before joining Lincoln City. He made his debut on 19 November 1908 in a 3–0 win away to Notts County Reserves in the Midland League. In the 1912–13 season, Barrell was the club's leading scorer, with 13 goals from Football League Second Division and FA Cup games, including a hat-trick at Bury. He played his last game for Lincoln City in April 1917 in the wartime competition, later playing for Ruston's again and also for Boston Town. Barrell died in 1960 aged 71.
