= Andy Flynn (footballer) =

English association football player

Personal information
- Full name: Andrew Flynn
- Date of birth: 1895
- Place of birth: Sheffield, England
- Height: 5 ft 8 in (1.73 m)
- Position: Full back

Senior career*
Years	Team	Apps	(Gls)
?–1922	Mexborough		
1922–1926	Exeter City	34	(1)
1926–1928	York City	80	(0)
1928–?	Boston Town		
Total		114	(1)
- * Club domestic league appearances and goals

Andrew Flynn (1895 – ?) was an English professional footballer who played as a full back. He played for Mexborough, Exeter City, York City and Boston Town.

== Career ==
Born in Sheffield, West Riding of Yorkshire, Flynn played for Mexborough of the Midland League before joining Third Division South Exeter City in 1922. He made his league debut for Exeter against Southend United on 9 December, and scored his first and only goal for the club with the winner in a 1–0 victory away at Swindon Town 16 February 1924. However, Flynn failed to command a regular place in the Exeter team during his four-season stay, finishing his time at the club with 34 league appearances and one goal.

Flynn returned to playing Midland League football after signing for York City in August 1926, making his debut on 28 August in a 1–1 draw at home to Loughborough Corinthians. He was ever-present for York in the 1926–27 season, appearing in all of York's 38 Midland League matches. He also played in York's seven FA Cup games that season, in a run that saw the club reach the first round for the first time in its history, eventually being knocked out in the second round away at Grimsby Town on 11 December. Flynn missed two games the following season, against Scarborough and Mexborough Athletic, in which he made 48 appearances in all competitions. He left York following the end of the season, having made 93 appearances in all competitions, joining Boston Town as a player and a trainer.

== Style of play ==
Flynn played as a full back, and was able to operate on both the right and left sides.
