= George Whyte (footballer) =

Scottish footballer (1909–1992)

Personal information
- Full name: George Whyte
- Date of birth: 24 March 1909
- Place of birth: Cowdenbeath, Scotland
- Date of death: 23 October 1992 (aged 83)
- Height: 5 ft 8 1/2 in (1.74 m)
- Positions: Outside left; left half

Youth career
- –: Kelty Rangers

Senior career*
Years	Team	Apps	(Gls)
1927–1928	Dunfermline Athletic	16	(0)
1928–1929	Rhyl Athletic		
1929–1931	Accrington Stanley	73	(15)
1931–1939	Lincoln City	299	(34)
–	Gainsborough Trinity		
- * Club domestic league appearances and goals

George Whyte (24 March 1909 – 23 October 1992) was a Scottish professional footballer who scored 49 goals from 372 appearances in the Football League playing for Accrington Stanley and Lincoln City. He also played in the Scottish Football League for Dunfermline Athletic, for Rhyl Athletic in Wales, and for English non-league club Gainsborough Trinity. He played as a left half or outside left.

== Life and career ==
Whyte was born in Cowdenbeath, Fife, Scotland, and played in the Scottish Football League for Dunfermline Athletic. He moved south to play for Welsh club Rhyl Athletic and then signed for Third Division North club Accrington Stanley. He made his debut in the 1929–30 Football League season, and went on to make 73 league appearances, scoring 15 goals, before he and Stanley teammate Harold Riley joined fellow Northern Section club Lincoln City in the 1931 close season. According to a season preview in the Daily Express, Whyte was "expected to be a useful substitute" for Walter Lax, who had been transferred to Blackpool for a "substantial sum".

Whyte made his debut in the first match of 1931–32 and played in every match that season as Lincoln won the Northern Section title and promotion to the Second Division. Originally an outside left, he was converted to play at left half in the following season. Whyte set a club record of 183 consecutive appearances in league matches, between March 1934 and September 1938. He left Lincoln at the end of the 1938–39 season, having made 322 appearances in all first-team competitions, a total that at the time was the third-highest in the club's history.

After his football career ended, Whyte worked for the Lincoln Co-operative Society. He died in 1992 at the age of 83.
