= Jeff Smith =

Jeff Smith or Jeffrey Smith may refer to:

== Sports ==
=== Combat sports ===
- Jeff Smith (boxer) (1891–1962), American boxer
- Jeff Smith (1948–2019), American professional wrestling manager best known as Izzy Slapawitz
- Jeff Smith (martial arts) (born 1963), American martial artist

=== Gridiron football ===
- Jeff Smith (linebacker) (born 1943), linebacker for the New York Giants
- Jeff Smith (defensive end) (born 1962), defensive end, played for the Cincinnati Bengals
- Jeff Smith (running back) (born 1962), running back, played for the Chiefs and Buccaneers
- Jeff Smith (tight end) (born 1962), tight end, played for the New York Giants
- Jeff Smith (wide receiver, born 1962), gridiron football player, notably in the Canadian Football League
- Jeff Smith (offensive lineman) (born 1973), played for the Chiefs, Jaguars and Steelers
- Jeff Smith (wide receiver, born 1997), wide receiver for the New York Giants

=== Other sports ===
- Jeff Smith (motorcyclist) (1934–2026), English world champion motocross racer
- Jeff Smith (footballer, born 1935), English football full back (Lincoln City)
- Jeff Smith (British racing driver) (born 1966), British racing car driver and businessman
- Jeff Smith (American racing driver) (born 1963), American stock car racing driver
- Jeff Smith (baseball) (born 1974), coach in the Minnesota Twins' organization
- Jeff Smith (darts player) (born 1975), Canadian darts player
- Jeff Smith (footballer, born 1980), English football defender/midfielder (Port Vale, Carlisle United and Darlington)
- Jeff Smith (shot putter) (born 1943), American shot putter, 1965 All-American for the USC Trojans track and field team

== Politics and government ==
- Jeff Smith (British politician) (born 1963), MP for Manchester Withington 2015–
- Jeff Smith (Mississippi politician) (born 1949), Republican (formerly Democratic) legislator
- Jeff Smith (Wisconsin politician) (born 1955), Wisconsin legislator
- Jeff Smith (Iowa politician) (born 1967), Iowa State Representative
- Jeff Smith (Missouri politician) (born 1973), former State Senator, convicted of crimes related to federal election law violations
- Jeffrey H. Smith (lawyer) (born 1944/1945), former General Counsel of the CIA

== Other ==
- Jeff Smith (cartoonist) (born 1960), creator of the comic book Bone
- Jeff Smith, comedy musician from duo Raymond and Scum
- Jeff Smith (chef) (1939–2004), host of The Frugal Gourmet TV program
- Jefferson "Jeff" Smith, the protagonist in the 1939 film Mr. Smith Goes to Washington
- Jeffrey H. Smith, former professor of mathematics at Purdue University, Indiana
- Jeffrey M. Smith (born 1958), journalist, author and documentary filmmaker
- Jeffrey W. Smith, biologist at the Burnham Institute
- Jeffrey Chipps Smith, American art historian
- Jeffrey G. Smith (1921–2021), U.S. Army general
- Jeff Smith (hedge fund manager) (born 1972/1973), American hedge fund manager
- R. Jeffrey Smith, American journalist
- Jeffrey L. Smith (died 2021), Washington, D.C. police officer, responded to the 2021 storming of the U.S Capitol Building

== See also ==
- Geoff Smith (disambiguation)
- Geoffrey Smith (disambiguation)
- Jefferson Smith (disambiguation)
