= Geoffrey Smith =

Geoffrey Smith may refer to:

- Geoffrey Bache Smith (1894–1916), English poet before and during World War I
- Geoffrey C. Smith (politician), member of the Ohio House of Representatives, 1999–2006
- Geoffrey C. Smith (sculptor) (born 1961), American sculptor and photographer
- Geoffrey Johnson-Smith (1924–2010), Conservative politician in the United Kingdom
- Geoffrey L. Smith (born 1955), scientist specialising in vaccinia virus poxvirus research
- Geoffrey Smith (admiral) (born 1950), Australian Deputy Chief of Navy, 1999–2000
- Geoffrey Smith (filmmaker), maker of documentaries including The English Surgeon and Presumed Guilty
- Geoffrey Smith (gardener) (1928–2009), English gardener, author, broadcaster
- Geoffrey Smith (radio presenter) (1943–2026), British-based American radio presenter and writer
- Geoffrey Smith (rugby league) (born c. 1934), rugby league footballer of the 1960s for Great Britain and for York
- Geoffrey Smith (bishop) (born 1958/1959), Anglican Archbishop of Adelaide from 2017
- Geoffrey Stuart Smith (1901–1981), Anglican bishop in North Kerala

== See also ==
- Geoff Smith (disambiguation)
- Jeff Smith (disambiguation)
