= George Nisbet =

English footballer

Personal information
- Full name: George Nisbet
- Positions: Centre half; left half

Senior career*
Years	Team	Apps	(Gls)
–	Maxwelltown Volunteers		
1906–1909	Lincoln City (Note: The free-access sections of the Lincoln City FC Archive do not separate Nisbet's appearances in the 1908–09 season between Midland League and FA Cup, so the infobox statistics just include appearances and goal in the Football League.)	62	(1)
- * Club domestic league appearances and goals

George Nisbet (fl. 1906–1909) was a professional footballer who played 104 games for Lincoln City, including 62 appearances in the Football League. He played as a centre half or left half.

== Playing career ==
Nisbet played for Maxwelltown Volunteers in Scotland before joining Lincoln City in August 1906 along with teammates George Kennedy and Norrie Fairgray. He went straight into the starting eleven for the opening game of the season, on 1 September in a 4–3 away win at Burton United in the Football League Second Division, and played regularly through that season. He appeared in 26 games in 1907–08, at the end of which Lincoln failed to be re-elected to the Football League. He again played regularly in 1908–09, contributing to Lincoln winning the Midland League title, after which they were re-elected to the Football League. Nisbet played his last competitive game for the club exactly three years after his debut, in a 5–0 defeat at Leeds City.
