= Jack Bryan (footballer) =

English footballer

Personal information
- Full name: John Joseph Bryan
- Date of birth: 22 August 1897
- Place of birth: Langwith, England
- Date of death: 1978 (aged 80–81)
- Height: 5 ft 8 1/2 in (1.74 m)
- Position: Right half

Senior career*
Years	Team	Apps	(Gls)
- Langwith Red Rose
- Mansfield Swifts
- Shirebrook
1918–1922	Lincoln City (Note: Figures are for appearances and goals in the Football League only. The free-access sections of the Lincoln City FC Archive does not separate appearances by competition other than for the Football League.)	75	(1)
- Mansfield Town
- Worksop Town
- Mexborough
- * Club domestic league appearances and goals

John Joseph Bryan (22 August 1897 – 1978) was an English professional footballer who made 75 appearances in the Football League for Lincoln City. He played as a right half.

== Life and career ==
Bryan was born in Langwith, Nottinghamshire. He played local football in the Nottinghamshire area before joining Lincoln City towards the end of the First World War. He played in all but three senior matches in the first post-war season, as Lincoln finished 21st in the Second Division and failed to gain re-election, and missed only two as they won the Midland League title and returned to the Football League as founder members of the Third Division North. He again played all but two matches in the 1921–22 season, one of which was in goal after Robert Bainbridge missed his train to the away game at Durham City. At the end of the season he moved into the Midland League with Mansfield Town, and later played for Worksop Town and Mexborough.
