= Richard Hood =

English footballer

Personal information
- Full name: Richard Parker Hood
- Date of birth: 10 June 1881
- Place of birth: Seaham, County Durham, England
- Date of death: 26 November 1954 (aged 73)
- Place of death: Earl Shilton, Leicestershire, England
- Positions: Centre half; right back

Senior career*
Years	Team	Apps	(Gls)
- Seaham Rovers
1904–1909	Lincoln City (Note: Infobox statistics are for appearances in the Football League only. Hood played 25 matches in 1908–09, which included the FA Cup tie against Liverpool. If he played in the Cup against Stockton as well, then 23 Midland League matches should be added to the infobox total; if not, then 24.)	130	(1)
- * Club domestic league appearances and goals

Richard Parker Hood (10 June 1881 – 26 November 1954) was an English professional footballer who made 130 appearances in the Football League playing for Lincoln City. He played as a centre half or right back.

== Life and career ==
Hood was born in Seaham, County Durham, and played football for Seaham Rovers before joining Lincoln City. He made his debut in October 1904 in the Football League Second Division. Hood, described by the Daily Express as a "resolute back", and his fellow defenders were instrumental as Lincoln eliminated Chelsea from the 1906–07 FA Cup on their own ground in a first round replay. He remained with the club after they failed to be re-elected to the Football League in 1908, and contributed to their Midland League title in 1908–09, making his final first-team appearance for Lincoln in the last match of that season.
