= Geoff Smith (Kent cricketer) =

English cricketer

Personal information
- Full name: Geoffrey Smith
- Born: 30 October 1925; Huddersfield, Yorkshire
- Died: 8 November 2016 (aged 91); Heathfield, East Sussex
- Batting: Right-handed
- Bowling: Right-arm medium-fast
- Role: Bowler

Domestic team information
- Years: Team
- 1951–1958: Kent
- FC debut: 6 June 1951 Kent v Minor Counties
- Last FC: 12 July 1958 Kent v Surrey

Career statistics
Competition	First-class
Matches	42
Runs scored	728
Batting average	12.33
100s/50s	0/2
Top score	60
Balls bowled	9,079
Wickets	165
Bowling average	22.82
5 wickets in innings	10
10 wickets in match	0
Best bowling	8/110
Catches/stumpings	29/–
- Source: CricInfo, 16 December 2018

Geoffrey Smith (30 November 1925 – 8 November 2016), known as Geoff Smith, was an English amateur cricketer who played for Kent County Cricket Club between 1951 and 1958. He made 42 appearances in first-class cricket for the county, playing in his holidays, and professionally worked on engineering projects around the world.

== Early life ==
Smith was born at Huddersfield in 1925. He was educated at Christ's Hospital, a private school in West Sussex. He played cricket at school, captaining the Christ's Hospital team in 1944, and was described as an "excellent allrounder" as a schoolboy. He played for The Rest against Lord's Schools in 1944, a season in which he led the Christ's Hospital school batting and bowling averages, scoring 276 runs and taking 40 wickets.

After leaving school, Smith played two one-day war-time matches for Surrey in 1945 before undertaking his National Service, after which he returned to play for Surrey Club and Ground, appearing for Surrey's Second XI in the Minor Counties Championship in 1948 and 1949. Smith also played club cricket for teams such as Old Blues and played several times for the Club Cricket Conference (CCC) in 1949 and 1950, including against touring teams from New Zealand and the West Indies. He was capped by the CCC in 1949.

== First-class cricket at Kent ==
Smith had moved to live in Kent by 1950 and played for Ashford Cricket Club. He impressed in matches against Kent County Cricket Club's Club and Ground teams and made his Kent First XI debut in June 1951, playing against Minor Counties at Canterbury. He took five wickets on his County Championship debut the following season and played for the county each season until 1958, taking time away from his job to do so as an amateur. He also played for the Second XI occasionally, making a major contribution with 42 wickets as Kent won the 1956 Minor Counties Championship. He was awarded his county cap in 1953 after taking 31 wickets in six matches that summer, and in 1957 led the county's bowling averages with 57 wickets at an average of 16.19 runs per wicket from 11 matches, including his best bowling figures of 8/110.

In 1958 Smith played only once for the Kent First XI as a heart condition began to restrict his ability to play effectively. He had managed to play with an irregular heart beat throughout his career, to the extent that he was known to collapse whilst bowling. He did not play again for the county, although he was able to play club cricket for a variety of teams. As a cricketer he was described by Wisden as "an energetic fast bowler" and by Derek Ufton, who he played with at Kent, as a "quick" bowler who "moved the ball both ways and bowled [a] tight line and length". He made all of his 42 first-class appearances for Kent, taking 165 wickets.

== Later life ==
Smith worked for the Haden Group and rose to become the company's Overseas Managing Director. He worked as a heating and ventilating engineer on projects such as the Sydney Opera House and the Shell Centre. He died at Heathfield, East Sussex in November 2016 aged 91. At the time of his death he was Kent's oldest living capped player.

== Bibliography ==
- Carlaw, Derek (2024). Kent County Cricketers, A to Z: Part Three (1946–1999) (PDF). Cardiff: ACS.
