= Fred Corbett (footballer, born 1909) =

English footballer

Personal information
- Full name: Frederick William Corbett
- Date of birth: 8 October 1909
- Place of birth: Birmingham, England
- Date of death: 20 November 1974 (aged 65)
- Height: 5 ft 9 in (1.75 m)
- Position: Full back

Senior career*
Years	Team	Apps	(Gls)
1927–1928	Birmingham	0	(0)
1928–1929	Worcester City		
1929–1930	Torquay United	21	(1)
1930–1936	Manchester City	15	(0)
1936–1939	Lincoln City	103	(0)
Total		139	(1)
- * Club domestic league appearances and goals

Frederick William Corbett (8 October 1909 – 20 November 1974) was an English professional footballer who made 139 appearances in the Football League playing for Torquay United, Manchester City and Lincoln City. He played as a full back.

== Life and career ==
Corbett was born in Birmingham, and began his football career with his local professional club, Birmingham F.C. He never appeared competitively for the first team, and moved on to Worcester City. After Worcester won the 1929 Birmingham & District League title, their player-manager, former Birmingham captain Frank Womack, was appointed secretary-manager of Football League Third Division South club Torquay United. In preparation for the 1929–30 season, Womack made "extensive changes", which included the signing of Corbett, described by the Daily Express as a "young and promising back". Corbett played regularly for Torquay at full-back alongside fellow youngster Sid Cann. The pair were often picked out in match reports as playing well, and both were sold to First Division club Manchester City before the end of the season.

Corbett had to wait until November 1932 – nearly three years – for his City debut. He replaced Cann at right-back in what the Manchester Guardian's correspondent called "a surprising change in the defensive arrangements of the team", fearing that, however much Corbett may have contributed to the "excellent defensive record" of the second eleven, the visit of the league leaders might not be an ideal time to introduce a debutant. In the event, City won 5–2, and Corbett was described as "certainly not the poorest" full back on the field. By the following week, he was "shaping as though he might establish himself in the right full-back position", but despite remaining at City for six years, he made only 15 first-team appearances, and was transfer-listed at the end of the 1935–36 season.

Lincoln City signed Corbett in May 1936. He missed only two of Lincoln's 46 games in all senior competitions in his first season as the club were runners-up in the Third Division North, and missed four out of 46 in the next. He appeared less frequently in the 1938–39 season, and when the Second World War put an end to league football for the duration, he had made 113 appearances for Lincoln in all competitions. He scored 51 goals from 120 appearances in all senior competitions in five years with Lincoln,

When Corbett left Manchester City, the club paid him £200 in lieu of the benefit which he might have received as a long-serving employee. The Players' Union funded a test case in 1939 in the names of Corbett and former City teammate Bill Dale to challenge the Inland Revenue's opinion that benefit payments were taxable; some 130 footballers would be affected by the decision. The local Tax Commissioners ruled against the players. On appeal to the High Court, the judge noted that under Football League regulations, testimonials were not obligatory but were expected and usually granted. He ruled that such payments were not "a purely exceptional gift", as contended on the recipients' behalf, but were "made in respect of and as remuneration for employment" and thus taxable.

Corbett died in 1974 at the age of 65.
