= Grimmett =

Grimmett is a surname. Notable people with the surname include:

- Bill Grimmett (born 1956), Canadian politician
- Clarrie Grimmett (1891–1980), New Zealand-born Australian cricketer
- Geoffrey Grimmett (born 1950), English mathematician working in probability theory
- Steve Grimmett (1959–2022), British heavy metal vocalist

== See also ==
- Grimma
- Grimme
- Grimmen
- Grimms
- Grommet
