= Norrie Fairgray =

Scottish footballer

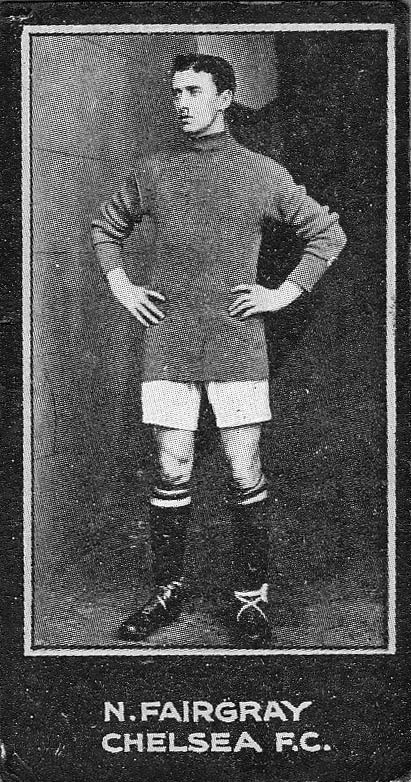

Personal information
- Full name: Norman Murray Fairgray
- Date of birth: 28 October 1880
- Place of birth: Dumfries, Scotland
- Date of death: 1968 (aged 87–88)
- Place of death: Holywood, Scotland
- Position: Outside left

Senior career*
Years	Team	Apps	(Gls)
–	Dumfries Primrose		
1901–1905	Maxwelltown Volunteers		
1903	→ Kilmarnock (loan)	1	(0)
1905–1907	Lincoln City		
1907–1914	Chelsea	79	(5)
1914–1915	Motherwell	32	(3)
1919–1921	Queen of the South		
- * Club domestic league appearances and goals

Norman Murray Fairgray (28 October 1880 – 1968) was a Scottish professional footballer who played mainly as an outside left for Maxwelltown Volunteers, Kilmarnock, Lincoln City, Chelsea, Motherwell and Queen of the South.

Having made the move from Maxwelltown to Lincoln a year earlier alongside George Kennedy and George Nisbet, Fairgray was signed for Chelsea in 1907 by manager David Calderhead, an ex-Queen of the South Wanderers player who had been Fairgray's manager at Lincoln. Soon afterwards, Kennedy followed the same path. At Chelsea Fairgray scored five goals in 84 games over seven seasons. At representative level he played in the Home Scots v Anglo-Scots annual trial match in 1908 and 1909 but was never selected for his country in a full international.

In August 1919, by now in his late 30s and having been out of top-level football for some time, Fairgray signed for hometown club Queen of the South. He played in their first-ever competitive game, a first round tie in the Scottish Qualifying Cup against Thornhill at Palmerston Park.
