= Alf Webb =

English footballer

Personal information
- Full name: Alfred Webb
- Date of birth: 1878
- Date of death: 25 August 1932 (aged 53–54)
- Height: 5 ft 11 in (1.80 m)
- Position: Goalkeeper

Senior career*
Years	Team	Apps	(Gls)
189?–1899	Mansfield		
1899–1904	Lincoln City	131	(0)
1904–19??	Mansfield Mechanics		
- * Club domestic league appearances and goals

Alfred Webb (1878 – 25 August 1932) was an English professional footballer who made 131 appearances in the Football League playing for Lincoln City as a goalkeeper.

Webb worked as a coal miner and played for Mansfield before joining Lincoln in the 1899 close season. He made 144 appearances for the club in all senior competitions, and later played for Mansfield Mechanics.
