= Tom Brooks (footballer) =

English footballer

Personal information
- Full name: Thomas William Brooks
- Date of birth: 2 February 1948
- Place of birth: Wallsend, England
- Position: Defender

Youth career
- Lincoln City

Senior career*
Years	Team	Apps	(Gls)
1965–1971	Lincoln City	113	(1)
- * Club domestic league appearances and goals

Thomas William Brooks (born 2 February 1948) is an English former professional footballer who made 113 appearances in the Football League playing for Lincoln City. He played as a defender.

Brooks was born in Wallsend, which was then in Northumberland. He was an apprentice with Lincoln City before making his debut on 10 April 1965 in a 2–0 win against Darlington in the Football League Fourth Division. He scored only once in a six-year career with the club, "a ferocious 30-yard drive" to give Lincoln a 2–0 lead away at Brentford in April 1968. He finished his league career in 1971 after 120 appearances in senior competition.
