= Arthur Atkin =

English footballer

Personal information
- Date of birth: 14 May 1893
- Place of birth: Skegness, Lincolnshire, England
- Date of death: 23 July 1952 (aged 59)
- Place of death: Spilsby, Lincolnshire, England
- Height: 5 ft 7 in (1.70 m)
- Positions: Full back; wing half

Senior career*
Years	Team	Apps	(Gls)
–	Skegness		
1913–1924	Lincoln City	132	(3)
–	Boston Town		
- * Club domestic league appearances and goals

Arthur W. Atkin (14 May 1893 – 23 July 1952) was an English professional footballer who made 96 appearances in the Football League playing for Lincoln City. He played as a full back or wing half.

== Life and career ==
Atkin was born in Skegness, Lincolnshire. He played football for his local club before joining Football League Second Division club Lincoln City. He made his first-team debut on the last day of the 1912–13 Football League season, and played twice more before league football was interrupted by the First World War. He scored only twice in the Football League, both goals coming in the first season after the resumption. He scored the second goal of Lincoln's 3–1 win at Stoke, in what the Daily Express called "one of the biggest surprises of the season"; Lincoln went on to finish 21st in the 22-team division, and failed to gain re-election to the League. Atkin played 36 matches, scoring once, as Lincoln won the Midland League title in 1921 and were elected to the newly formed Football League Third Division North. He finished his Football League career with Lincoln in 1924, and then returned to the Midland League with Boston Town.

Atkin was married to Grace and had children Joyce and Maurice. He died in 1952 at the age of 59.
