= Tommy Wield =

English footballer

Personal information
- Full name: Thomas William Wield
- Date of birth: 20 December 1885
- Place of birth: Lincoln, England
- Date of death: 18 April 1963 (aged 77)
- Place of death: Lincoln
- Position: Wing half

Senior career*
Years	Team	Apps	(Gls)
–	St Catherines (Lincoln)		
1904–1906	Lincoln City	13	(0)
–	Grantham Avenue		
1909–1919	Lincoln City (Note: Infobox stats exclude appearances in the 1911–12 season in the Central League. The free-to-access section of the Lincoln City FC Archive does not separate appearances in leagues other than the Football League from "other" appearances.)	118	(5)
–	Scunthorpe & Lindsey United		
–	Gainsborough Trinity		
1922	Grantham	1	(0)
–	Horncastle Town		
–	Lincoln Claytons		
- * Club domestic league appearances and goals

Thomas William Wield (20 December 1885 – 18 April 1963) was an English professional footballer who made 131 appearances in the Football League playing for Lincoln City. He played as a wing half.

== Life and career ==
Wield was born in Lincoln, Lincolnshire, and began his football career with St Catherines before joining his local professional club, Lincoln City. He made his debut in a 1–0 win away to Burslem Port Vale in the Football League Second Division in October 1904, and played 13 league games before spending a couple of seasons back in local football with Grantham Avenue. He returned to Lincoln City in 1909, and remained with the club for the next ten years, playing his last game for the club in the War League in 1919.

After the war, he played for Scunthorpe & Lindsey United and Gainsborough Trinity, made one Central Alliance appearance for Grantham in September 1922, and finished his career with Horncastle Town and then Lincoln Claytons.

Wield died in Lincoln in 1963.
