= Billy McBean =

Australian rules footballer (1889–1976)

Personal information
- Full name: William Harold McBean
- Born: 28 February 1889; Hawthorn, Victoria
- Died: 19 June 1976 (aged 87); Manangatang, Victoria
- Original team: Scotch College

Playing career^{1}
Years	Club	Games (Goals)
1909	Melbourne	1 (0)
- ^{1} Playing statistics correct to the end of 1909.

William Harold McBean (28 February 1889 – 19 June 1976) was an Australian rules footballer who played with Melbourne in the Victorian Football League (VFL).

== Family ==
The son of William McBean (1858–1921), and Lucy Margaret Leontine McBean (1862–1949), née Mortimer, William Harold McBean was born at Hawthorn, Victoria on 28 February 1889.

He married Mary Rothwell Dougall in 1917. They were divorced in 1934.

== Education ==
He attended Scotch College, Melbourne in 1906, and was a member of the Scotch College premiership First XVIII in 1906.

== Football ==
=== Melbourne (VFL) ===
He played one match for the Melbourne Football Club: against University on 14 August 1909.

=== Richmond (VFL) ===
Although cleared from Melbourne to Richmond in 1910, he did not ever play for Richmond.
