= Don Dykes =

English footballer

Personal information
- Full name: Donald William Dykes
- Date of birth: 8 June 1930
- Place of birth: Ashby by Partney, England
- Date of death: 25 October 2016 (aged 86)
- Place of death: Lincoln, England
- Position: Wing half

Senior career*
Years	Team	Apps	(Gls)
19??–1949	Metheringham		
1949–1959	Lincoln City	95	(4)
1959–1961	Boston United	67	(5)
- * Club domestic league appearances and goals

Donald William Dykes (8 June 1930 – 25 October 2016) was an English professional footballer who made 95 appearances in the Football League playing for Lincoln City. He played as a wing half.

== Life and career ==
Dykes was born in Ashby by Partney, Lincolnshire, and began his football career with village club Metheringham. He signed for Lincoln City of the Third Division North, having been spotted when he played in a charity match against them during the 1948–49 season; he also attracted an offer from Second Division Leicester City. He made his senior debut in August 1949, and went on to play 101 matches, scoring four times, in all competitions. Dykes moved into non-league football with Boston United in 1959. In the first of his two seasons with the club, he played 53 matches in all competitions.

Dykes died in Lincoln in 2016 at the age of 86.
