= Jack Kendall =

English professional footballer (1905 - 1961)

Personal information
- Full name: John William Kendall
- Date of birth: 9 October 1905
- Place of birth: Broughton, England
- Date of death: October 1961 (aged 55–56)
- Height: 5 ft 11 in (1.80 m)
- Position: Goalkeeper

Senior career*
Years	Team	Apps	(Gls)
–	Broughton Rangers		
1922–1924	Lincoln City	71	(0)
1924–1927	Everton	21	(0)
1927–1927	Preston North End	2	(0)
1928–1930	Lincoln City	46	(0)
1930–1934	Sheffield United	80	(0)
1934–1938	Peterborough United	125	(0)
Total		345	(0)
- * Club domestic league appearances and goals

John William Kendall (9 October 1905 – October 1961) was an English professional footballer who made 220 appearances in the Football League playing for Lincoln City (in two spells), Everton, Preston North End and Sheffield United. He played as a goalkeeper. He also played 125 games for Peterborough United in the Midland League.

== Life and career ==
Kendall was born in Broughton, near Brigg in Lincolnshire. He played football for his local club before joining Lincoln City. He made his first-team debut on 2 September 1922, shortly before his 17th birthday, and kept a clean sheet against Halifax Town in the Football League Third Division North. Later that season, he inadvertently played a leading role in Wigan Borough's record Football League victory, by nine goals to one. On 3 March 1923, Lincoln were 2–0 behind away at Wigan Borough when Kendall was knocked unconscious by the ball rebounding off the frame of the goal and striking him on the back of the head. He was taken to hospital, and with full-back George Greaves as stand-in goalkeeper, Lincoln conceded a further seven goals.

First Division club Everton sent a director to watch Kendall in March 1924; he reported back "very favorably", and thought the player could be available for "about £1,500". After further scouting trips, the club authorised his purchase at "up to £1,000". A fee of £1,250 was eventually agreed, and Kendall joined Everton in April. Selected instead of incumbent Alfred Harland for the second of three games in four days over the Easter weekend, he made what the Daily Express described as "a promising debut" as Everton beat Tottenham Hotspur 4–2. With Harland injured, Kendall began the 1924–25 season in the first team, and kept his place for a time after Harland's return to fitness. He made two more first-team appearances that season, in February 1925, again while Harland was unfit. At the end of the season, he was initially transfer-listed at a fee of £750, but was later re-engaged at a weekly wage of £6.

Early in the 1925–26 season, both Harland and Kendall played, but when Everton introduced a new first-team goalkeeper in England international Harry Hardy in October 1925, both were made available for transfer at fees of £1,500. The directors were not prepared to allow either to go out on loan to Crystal Palace. Kendall was retained for 1926–27, but returned for pre-season training in need of knee cartilage surgery that was to leave him unavailable for selection until mid-November. He was transfer-listed again in April 1927 at a fee of £100, and joined Preston North End in May for £50; Everton agreed to pay him the same amount as accrued share of any long-service benefit which he might have expected.

Kendall made only two league appearances for Preston, and rejoined Lincoln City in the 1928 close season. He eventually displaced Len Hill as first choice goalkeeper, and played his last game for Lincoln in March 1930. He then returned to the First Division with Sheffield United. Soon afterwards, he was involved in an 8–1 defeat against Arsenal at Highbury. Injured after half an hour, by which time Arsenal were already three goals to the good, he remained on the field while they scored another three, and after he left, another two. The last of his 80 league appearances for Sheffield United, and his last in the Football League, was also against Arsenal: a 2–0 defeat on the final day of the 1933–34 season that confirmed Arsenal as league champions.

He became the first full-time professional to be signed by the newly formed Peterborough United in 1934 as they prepared for their first season in the Midland League. He remained with the club as first-choice goalkeeper for four years.

Kendall died in October 1961, aged about 56.
