= Geoffrey C. Smith (sculptor) =

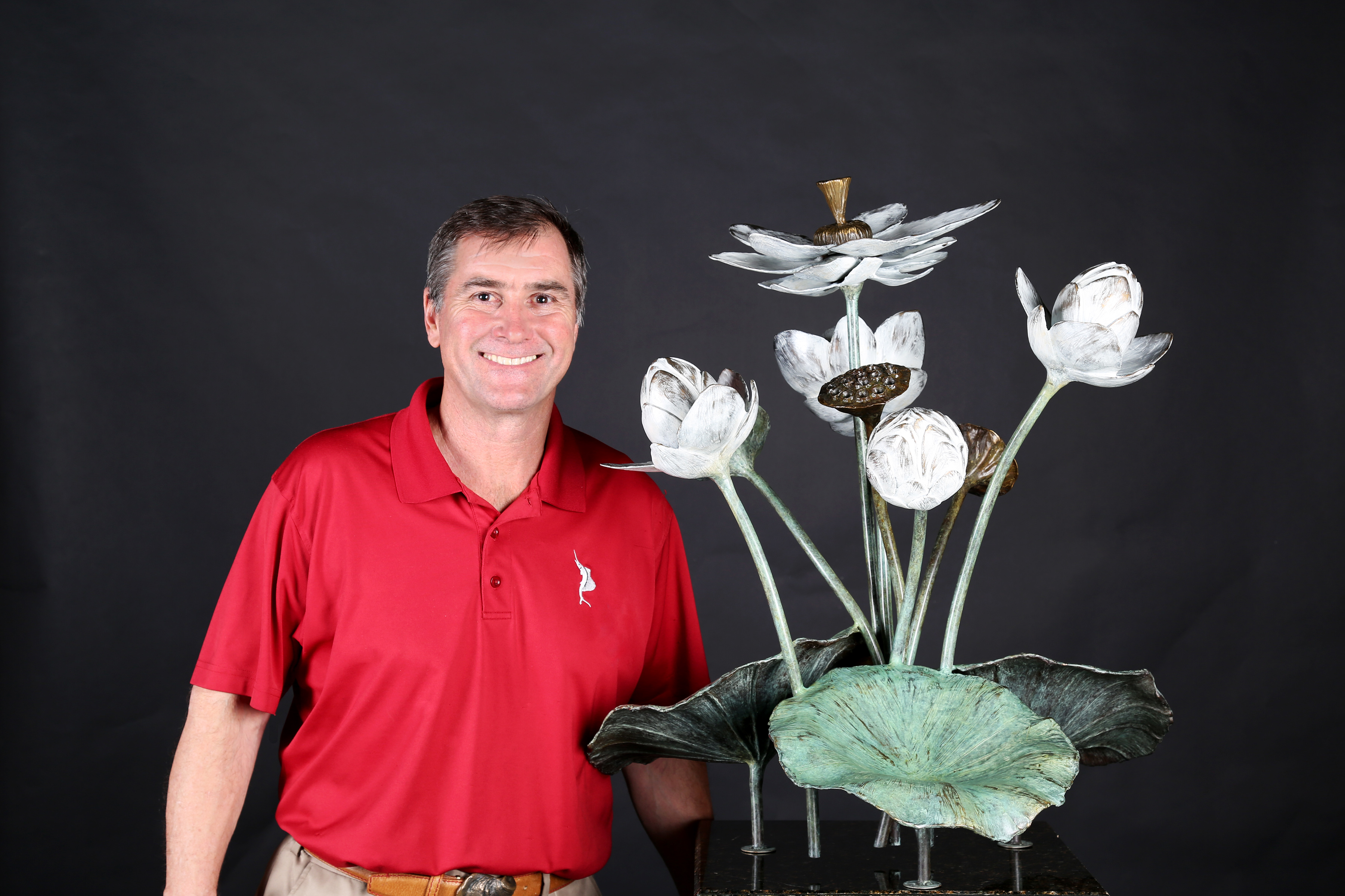
- The Lotus "Rising Above" by Geoffrey C. Smith given to Pope Francis by President Donald Trump May 24, 2017
- Born: 1961 (age 64–65); San Francisco, California
- Education: Montana State University, Bozeman, Montana
- Known for: Sculpture, Photography
- Movement: Representational Wildlife Sculpture
- Website: www.geoffreycsmith.com

Geoffrey C. Smith (born 1961) is an American bronze sculptor and photographer. He is a graduate of Montana State University, and currently resides in the coastal town of Stuart, Florida. His best-known work is that of the "Stuart Sailfish," an 18-foot monument situated in Downtown Stuart.

== Early life ==
Smith was born in San Francisco, California in 1961 to Maurice Smith, a neurosurgeon, and homemaker Carolyn Smith. He is the middle child of three sons.

Smith's interest in artistry was subsequently inspired by his maternal grandfather Charles, a wood carver. By the age of 15, Smith had begun to carve wooden duck decoys.

He then entered Montana State University to major in economics. He graduated with honors, and also enrolled in several art courses. In the fall of 1980, he held his first gallery show at Gallery 85 in Billings, Montana, and sold every piece he exhibited. Smith exchanged wood for bronze upon graduating in 1983, and promptly cast his first bronze sculpture the following year, a trumpeter swan in 12 editions, and sold every edition upon casting.

== Later years ==
In 1990 Smith converted an historic building in Billings, Montana into his first studio and gallery that would showcase his work for the next six years.

In 1996 Smith moved with his family to Stuart, Florida. He opened a new gallery at 47 West Osceola Street in 1997, situated across from the historic Lyric Theater.

In 2015 Smith opened his second gallery and working studio in nearby Port Salerno at 4545 SE Dixie Highway where he continues to build his creations today.

== Style and methods ==
Smith is characterized as a representational sculptor, and though stylistically he may be viewed as a naturalist, his signature aesthetic can be deemed "loose" wherein the subjects of his work are represented by their basic elements, with fingerprints giving the suggestion of feathers or fur.

== Stuart Sailfish ==
The Stuart Sailfish is an 18 ft bronze monument sculpted by Geoffrey Smith and cast by Eagle Bronze Incorporated, located in Lander, Wyoming. The 3,000 lb sculpture, installed in 2003 in the center of the "Sailfish Circle" roundabout at Dixie Highway and Joan Jefferson way, was created with special architectural armature, enabling it to withstand wind gusts of up to 200 mph, an essential in an area frequently hit by hurricanes. Since its installation on January 2, 2003, it has since been adopted as the symbol of the city of Stuart, Florida, a location deemed "The Sailfish Capital of the World."

== The Lotus "Rising Above" ==
The Lotus "Rising Above" by Geoffrey C. Smith was given to Pope Francis by United States President Donald Trump on May 24, 2017 during Trump's visit to the Vatican.

== Artistic career ==
Public commissions

(2016 - 2015) City of Stuart - Stuart, FL - Birds on Colorado Avenue Five life size individual sculptures of birds native to Florida including American Heritage, Pair of Osprey, Skimming the Wave III, The Roseate Spoonbill and The Dancing Sandhill Crane

(2010) Florida Oceanographic Society - Stuart, FL -The Sea Life Monument 19’ tall intricate monument depicting a variety of wildlife endemic to Florida’s Treasure Coast 890 NE Ocean Blvd, Stuart, FL 34994

(2010) Willoughby Country Club - Stuart, FL - Errie Ball Bust 1 1/2-Life size bronze bust of professional golfer Errie Ball 3001 SE Doubleton Dr., Stuart, FL 34997

(2008) The Children’s Museum - Indian Riverside Park - Jensen Beach, FL- Life’s Journey 16’ tall sculpture of mother and calf dolphins leaping 1707 NE Indian River Dr., Jensen Beach, FL 34957

(2007) Harborage Yacht Club - Stuart, FL - Blue Thunder Fountain with 16’ tall marlin & tuna sculpture 915 NW Flagler Ave, Stuart, FL 34994

(2006) Jensen Beach High School - Jensen Beach, FL - The Falcon Monument 12’ tall bronze Falcon representing Jensen Beach High School’s mascot 2875 NW Goldenrod Rd, Jensen Beach, FL 34957

(2005) Martin Memorial Health Systems - Stuart, FL - Trio of Leaping Bottlenose Dolphin Fountain featuring a 7’ tall sculpture of bottlenose dolphins 711 SE Osceola St, Stuart, FL 34994

(2004) Martin Memorial Hospital, Weissman Cancer Center - Stuart, FL - The Shell Boys Fountain depicting two young boys (life size) at play with giant clamshells 501 SE Osceola St, Stuart, FL 34994

(2003) City of Stuart - Stuart, FL - The Stuart Sailfish Monument Fountain featuring a 19’ tall sailfish, SW Joan Jefferson Way, Stuart, FL 34994

(2000) Palm Beach Zoo - Palm Beach, FL - Water Dogs Bronze sculpture of two lifesize river otters at play 1301 Summit Blvd, West Palm Beach, FL 33405
