= Brendan Guest =

English footballer (born 1958)

Personal information
- Full name: Brendan John Guest
- Date of birth: 19 December 1958 (age 67)
- Place of birth: Barnsley, England
- Height: 5 ft 10 1/2 in (1.79 m)
- Position: Right back

Youth career
- Lincoln City England U-19 International

Senior career*
Years	Team	Apps	(Gls)
1975–1980	Lincoln City	104	(2)
1980–1981	Swindon Town	0	(0)
1981–1983	Forest Green Rovers		
- * Club domestic league appearances and goals

Brendan John Guest (born 19 December 1958) is an English former professional footballer who made 104 appearances in the Football League playing for Lincoln City as a right back. With Forest Green Rovers, he won the 1982 FA Vase at Wembley. He also represented England at Under 19 level against Wales (twice), Greece, Belgium and Iceland.

== Life and career ==
Guest was born in Barnsley, Yorkshire, and began his football career as an apprentice with Lincoln City. He turned professional with that club, and made his senior debut on 11 December 1976, just before his 18th birthday, in an FA Cup tie against Nuneaton Borough. He went on to play 116 matches, scoring twice, in all competitions. Guest joined Swindon Town in June 1980, but was released after sustaining an injury in September 1980 without having appeared for the first team, and moved into non-league football with Forest Green Rovers. He is a former England Youth international having represented his country at U-19 level at the European UEFA tournament in Belgium.

Guest was a member of the Forest Green team that won the Hellenic League in the 1981–82 season, thus gaining promotion to the Southern League, and won the 1982 FA Vase, defeating Rainworth Miners Welfare 3–0 at Wembley. He was one of three players booked in the Vase final for "over-exuberant tackles".

== Honours ==
Forest Green Rovers

- Hellenic League: 1981–82
- FA Vase: 1981–82

- England U-19 Youth International
