= Geoff Smith (Australian footballer) =

Australian rules footballer

Personal information
- Full name: Geoff Smith
- Born: 22 October 1948 (age 78)
- Original team: Norwood
- Height: 175 cm (5 ft 9 in)
- Weight: 70 kg (154 lb)

Playing career^{1}
Years	Club	Games (Goals)
1969–72	Hawthorn	38 (24)
- ^{1} Playing statistics correct to the end of 1972.

Geoff Smith (born 22 October 1948) is a former Australian rules footballer who played with Hawthorn in the Victorian Football League (VFL).
