= Dennis O'Donnell =

English footballer (1880–c.1908)

Personal information
- Full name: Dennis O'Donnell
- Date of birth: q1 1880^{[A]}
- Place of birth: Willington Quay, England
- Position: Forward

Senior career*
Years	Team	Apps	(Gls)
–	Willington Athletic		
1901–1905	Lincoln City	118	(31)
1905–1906	Sunderland	21	(5)
1906–1907	Queens Park Rangers	25	(7)
1907–1908	Notts County	18	(4)
1908–1909	Bradford Park Avenue	10	(1)
- * Club domestic league appearances and goals

Dennis O'Donnell (q1 1880^{[A]} – after 1908) was an English professional footballer who scored 41 goals from 167 appearances in the Football League playing as a forward for Lincoln City, Sunderland, Notts County and Bradford Park Avenue. He also played in the Southern League for Queens Park Rangers.

== Football career ==
O'Donnell was born in Willington Quay, then in Northumberland. He made his debut for Lincoln City on 5 October 1901 in a 2–1 win at home to Middlesbrough in the Football League Second Division, and played for the club until the end of the 1904–05 season, during which he was the club's leading scorer, with 15 goals from League and FA Cup games. He then signed for First Division Sunderland. Though he scored on his First Division debut, his next goal came more than four months later, and at the end of the season he moved on to Southern League for Queens Park Rangers. After one year in London, O'Donnell returned to the Football League, spending the 1907–08 season with Notts County and the 1908–09 season at Bradford Park Avenue.

== Notes ==
A. ^{a} ^{b} : O'Donnell's birth was registered in the first quarter of 1880. However, a period of 42 days was permitted between birth and registration, so he may have been born as early as mid-November 1879.
