= Gordon Simmonite =

English footballer (born 1957)

Personal information
- Full name: Gordon Simmonite
- Date of birth: 25 April 1957 (age 69)
- Place of birth: Sheffield, England
- Position: Full back

Youth career
- –: Rotherham United

Senior career*
Years	Team	Apps	(Gls)
197?–1978	Sheffield Wednesday	1	(0)
1978–1980	Boston United (Note: Figures are for the 1979–80 and 1980–81 seasons in the Alliance Premier League only. The statistics at Ken Fox's BUFC site for the 1978–79 season in the Northern Premier League are incomplete.)	33	(1)
1980–1982	Blackpool	63	(1)
1982–1988	Lincoln City	85	(0)
1988–19xx	Gainsborough Trinity		
19xx–199x	Matlock Town		

International career
1979–1980	England semi-pro	5	
- * Club domestic league appearances and goals

Gordon Simmonite (born 25 April 1957) is an English former professional footballer who made 136 appearances in the Football League playing for Sheffield Wednesday, Blackpool and Lincoln City. He also played Non-League football for Boston United, Gainsborough Trinity and Matlock Town. He played as a full back.

== Life and career ==
Simmonite was born in Sheffield, Yorkshire, and began his football career as an apprentice with Rotherham United. He then joined Sheffield Wednesday, for whom he played just once in the Third Division – in a 2–0 defeat away to Chesterfield in February 1977 – before moving into Non-League football with Northern Premier League club Boston United the following year. He was voted the club's player of the year in his first season, and won five caps for the England semi-professional national team.

In 1980, Simmonite returned to the Football League with Third Division Blackpool for a £15,000 fee. He made his debut in a 3–0 defeat at Brentford on 20 September, and went on to make a further 17 League appearances that season, under player-manager Alan Ball firstly, then Allan Brown.

The following 1981–82 campaign saw Simmonite make 29 League appearances. He also scored one goal, in a 7–1 victory over Halifax Town at Bloomfield Road on 30 September.

Under new manager Sam Ellis, he started the first sixteen League games of Blackpool's 1982–83 season, before family reasons prompted a move to Lincoln City for a £6,000 fee. He played regularly for the first couple of years, but then made no senior appearances until 1987, after Lincoln suffered two consecutive relegations, becoming the first team to be automatically relegated to the Conference. He acted as assistant manager in the early part of the 1987–88 Football Conference season, and returned as a player in December, making 13 appearances as Lincoln returned to the Football League as champions.

After leaving Lincoln, Simmonite appeared for Northern Premier League clubs Gainsborough Trinity and Matlock Town.
