= Chris Moyses =

English footballer (born 1965)

Personal information
- Full name: Christopher Raymond Moyses
- Date of birth: 1 November 1965 (age 60)
- Place of birth: Lincoln, England
- Position: Defender

Senior career*
Years	Team	Apps	(Gls)
1982–1984	Lincoln City	4	(0)
1984–1985	Halifax Town	25	(0)
1985	Boston United	0	(0)
1985	Shepshed Charterhouse		
1985–1986	Grantham	26	(0)
1990–1991	Bourne Town	12	(0)
Total		64	(0)

Managerial career
- 2010–2011: Lincoln Moorlands Railway
- 2014: Lincoln City (caretaker)
- 2014–2016: Lincoln City
- 2018: Alfreton Town
- * Club domestic league appearances and goals

Christopher Raymond Moyses (born 1 November 1965) is an English football coach and former professional player. He is a former manager of Lincoln City and Alfreton Town.

As a player, he was a defender from 1982 to 1986 with Lincoln City, Halifax Town, Boston United, Shepshed Dynamo and Grantham. In the 1990–91 season he played for Bourne Town. He has since coached at Lincoln United before managing Lincoln Moorlands Railway. In 2011, he became involved with the youth setup at Lincoln City, also taking on a role as coach of the first team.

== Playing career ==
Moyses played in the Football League for Lincoln City and Halifax Town, before moving onto the non-league circuit where he appeared for a number of, largely Lincolnshire based, clubs. He began the 1985–86 season with Boston United, appearing as a substitute in the club's 5–3 Lincolnshire Senior Cup home victory over Grimsby Town on 3 August 1985. It would be his only appearance for the club before he moved on, first to Shepshed Charterhouse before joining Grantham, debuting in the club's 1–0 defeat at Hednesford Town on 28 October 1985. He went on to make 26 appearances for the club in their Southern Football League Midland division campaign before leaving at the end of the season. In the 1990–91 season he played for Bourne Town helping them win the United Counties League Premier Division for the 4th time in the club's history.

== Coaching career ==
In September 2009 he resigned his position as Assistant Manager at Lincoln United. In February 2010 he was appointed manager of Lincoln Moorlands Railway, helping the team secure 22 points from their final eleven league games to avoid relegation from the Northern Counties East Football League Premier Division. In the 2010–2011 season he steered the club to sixth place in the league, their highest ever position, but he resigned from the club on 14 May 2011 to invest in the Centre of Excellence at Lincoln City. The investment saw him assuming a coaching role within the Imps' youth structure.

On 3 November 2014, he was appointed caretaker manager of Lincoln City following the decision to relieve Gary Simpson of his duties. On 8 December 2014, he was appointed the full-time manager of Lincoln City after signing a 12-month rolling contract. In April 2016 it was announced he would leave the role at the end of the 2015–16 season. He was replaced by Danny Cowley in May 2016. He was appointed manager of Alfreton Town in January 2018, but left them in May 2018.

== Managerial statistics ==
As of 13 May 2016

Managerial record by team and tenure
Team	From	To	Record					Ref
Team	From	To	G	W	D	L	Win %	Ref
Lincoln City	3 November 2014	13 May 2016	80	27	19	34	33.8	
Total			80	27	19	34	33.8	
