= Jim Grummett Sr. =

English footballer

Jim Grummett
Personal information
- Full name: James Grummett
- Date of birth: 31 July 1918
- Place of birth: Birdwell, England
- Date of death: 11 May 1996 (aged 77)
- Place of death: Lincoln, England
- Position: Wing half

Senior career*
Years	Team	Apps	(Gls)
–	Ruston Sports		
1943–1952	Lincoln City	165	(12)
1952–1953	Accrington Stanley	40	(1)
1953–1954	Boston United	25	(2)
- * Club domestic league appearances and goals

James Grummett (31 July 1918 – 11 May 1996) was an English professional footballer who scored 13 goals from 205 appearances in the Football League, playing for Lincoln City and Accrington Stanley. He played as a wing half. He also played in the Midland League for Boston United.

== Life and career ==
Grummett was born in Birdwell, which was then in the West Riding of Yorkshire. He first played for Lincoln City during the Second World War, and by the time he made his Football League debut he was 28 years old. He contributed to Lincoln's Football League Third Division North titles in 1948 and 1952, and finished his career with the club at the end of the latter season, having played 165 matches in the league. He then spent one season with Accrington Stanley in the Third Division North and one with Boston United, for whom he played 25 games scoring twice in the Midland League and 5 games, also scoring twice, in the FA Cup.

Grummett died in Lincoln in 1996. His son, also called Jim, played 251 Football League games for Lincoln City and a further 131 for other clubs.
