= Roger Holmes (footballer) =

English footballer

Personal information
- Full name: Roger William Holmes
- Date of birth: 9 September 1942 (age 84)
- Place of birth: Scunthorpe, England
- Positions: Inside forward; wing half

Senior career*
Years	Team	Apps	(Gls)
- Limestone Rangers
1959–1970	Lincoln City	278	(36)
- Lincoln United
- Skellingthorpe
- * Club domestic league appearances and goals

Roger William Holmes (born 9 September 1942) is an English former professional footballer who scored 36 goals from 278 games in the Football League playing as an inside forward or wing half for Lincoln City, his only professional club.

== Career ==
Holmes was born in Scunthorpe, Lincolnshire, and attended Brigg Grammar School. While still at school he played for Limestone Rangers in the Gainsborough League, and made his debut at 15 for Lincoln City's reserve team. He left school with 13 O-levels, and began training as an industrial chemist at a Scunthorpe steel works. He signed for Lincoln City as a part-time professional, and made his debut in the Football League on 18 April 1960, aged only 17, in a Second Division away game against Brighton & Hove Albion. He was gradually introduced to regular first-team football, and remained with the club as they dropped to the Fourth Division. He was Lincoln's top scorer with 14 goals in 1967–68, but suffered an injury towards the end of that season which kept him out until the September. Only a few games after his return, he broke both bones of his leg, an injury which kept him out of football for 18 months and from which he never recovered his previous standard of play. After retiring from professional football, having made 305 appearances for his only club, he played and coached in non-League and junior football, including working under Graham Taylor with Lincoln's youth team.

After football, he spent 25 years with a major finance company, working his way up to a regional management position. He lived in Lincolnshire after retirement.
