= George Peden (footballer) =

Scottish footballer

Personal information
- Full name: George Wright Watson Peden
- Date of birth: 12 April 1943
- Place of birth: Rosewell, Midlothian, Scotland
- Date of death: 22 September 2026 (aged 83)
- Height: 5 ft 10 in (1.78 m)
- Position: Left back

Senior career*
Years	Team	Apps	(Gls)
1962–1964	Arniston Rangers		
1964–1967	Heart of Midlothian	13	(0)
1967–1974	Lincoln City	223	(13)
1974–19??	Worksop Town		
- * Club domestic league appearances and goals

George Wright Watson Peden (born 12 April 1943) was a Scottish former footballer, who played as a left back.

== Career ==
Peden began his career as a youth with Bonnyrigg Rose Athletic A, before signing his first professional contract with Hibernian (Hibs). After a small number of trial games for Hibs he was loaned to junior club Arniston Rangers. He subsequently joined Heart of Midlothian in May 1964 and played 13 times for them in the Scottish Football League.

He then made 223 appearances in the Football League for Lincoln City. After leaving Lincoln played non-league football in England for Worksop Town.

In September 1967, Peden and Jim Grummett scored the goals as Lincoln eliminated First Division club Newcastle United in the second round of the League Cup. The team went on to reach the fourth round, in which they lost to Derby County after a replay in front of what remains, as of 2014, Lincoln's record home attendance, of 23,196.
