= Willie Bean =

American canine political candidate

Willie Bean Roscoe P Coltrane

Willie Bean Roscoe P Coltrane is a yellow labrador retriever who has been the focus of several political satires during 2008, and is also the first dog who ran for mayor of Fairhope, Alabama. Tress Turner is the owner and director of the Willie Bean for Mayor and Willie Bean for President campaigns.

== Local recognition ==
Received the ceremonial first catch before the Mobile BayBears Braves game.

Icon for Baldwin Animal Rescue Center (BARC), a Humane society group, and Fairhope Dog Park Coalition, in an attempt to increase donations for a Fairhope Dog Park. As of November 16, 2008, Willie Bean has helped raise almost 2,000 dollars towards the cause.

== National recognition ==
Willie Bean was mentioned in an act on the Late Show with David Letterman in a satire attempt to elect Muffins the Turtle.

Willie Bean was also selected as one of the Creatures Small and Great of 2008 by AOL News.

== History ==
Similar events in 2004 in Rabbit Hash, Kentucky, elected Junior Cochran, a black Lab, as mayor. It was the second canine elected to lead the small Northern Kentucky town, according to the town's Web site.

== See also ==
- List of individual dogs
