= Jim Grummett Jr. =

English footballer (born 1945)

Jim Grummett
Personal information
- Full name: James Grummett
- Date of birth: 11 July 1945 (age 81)
- Place of birth: Maltby, England
- Position: Centre half

Senior career*
Years	Team	Apps	(Gls)
- Ruston Bucyrus
1963–1971	Lincoln City	251	(19)
1971–1973	Aldershot	81	(6)
1973	Chester	16	(0)
1973–1974	Rochdale	34	(2)
1974	Denver Dynamos	20	(0)
1974–1975	Boston United		
- * Club domestic league appearances and goals

James Grummett (born 11 July 1945), known as Jim Grummett or Jimmy Grummett, is an English former professional footballer who scored 27 goals from 382 appearances in the Football League, playing for Lincoln City, Aldershot, Chester and Rochdale. He played as a centre half. He also played in the North American Soccer League for Denver Dynamos and in the Northern Premier League for Boston United.

== Life and career ==
Grummett was born in Maltby, which was then in the West Riding of Yorkshire, the son of Lincoln City and Accrington Stanley footballer Jim Grummett Sr. In 1963, he was capped three times by England at youth level. He made his first-team debut for Lincoln City on 4 November 1963, in a League Cup match against Millwall. In September 1967, Grummett and George Peden scored the goals as Lincoln eliminated First Division club Newcastle United in the second round of the League Cup. The team went on to reach the fourth round, in which they lost to Derby County after a replay in front of Lincoln's record home attendance, of 23,196. He captained the team, played in all outfield positions for Lincoln, and also kept goal for nearly an hour in a League Cup win at Chester in December 1968 after John Kennedy was taken to hospital with a fractured elbow. He remained with the club for eight seasons, during which time he scored 27 goals from 279 games in all first-team competitions.

Grummett moved on to fellow Fourth Division club Aldershot in the 1971 close season. Shortly after joining, he and other players threatened to submit transfer requests after the rents of their club-owned houses were raised by 150%. Because the initial rent was agreed verbally rather than written into the players' contracts, the Football League were unable to intervene. Grummett spent two years with the club, and contributed to their promotion in 1973.

He spent a short spell with Chester in the Fourth Division in 1973, for whom he scored the only goal of the first-round FA Cup tie against Telford United, before finishing the season with Rochdale as they were relegated from the Third Division.

Grummett played for Denver Dynamos in the 1974 North American Soccer League season, then returned to England, where he finished the season with Northern Premier League club Boston United.
