= J. Verne Smith =

American politician (1925–2006)

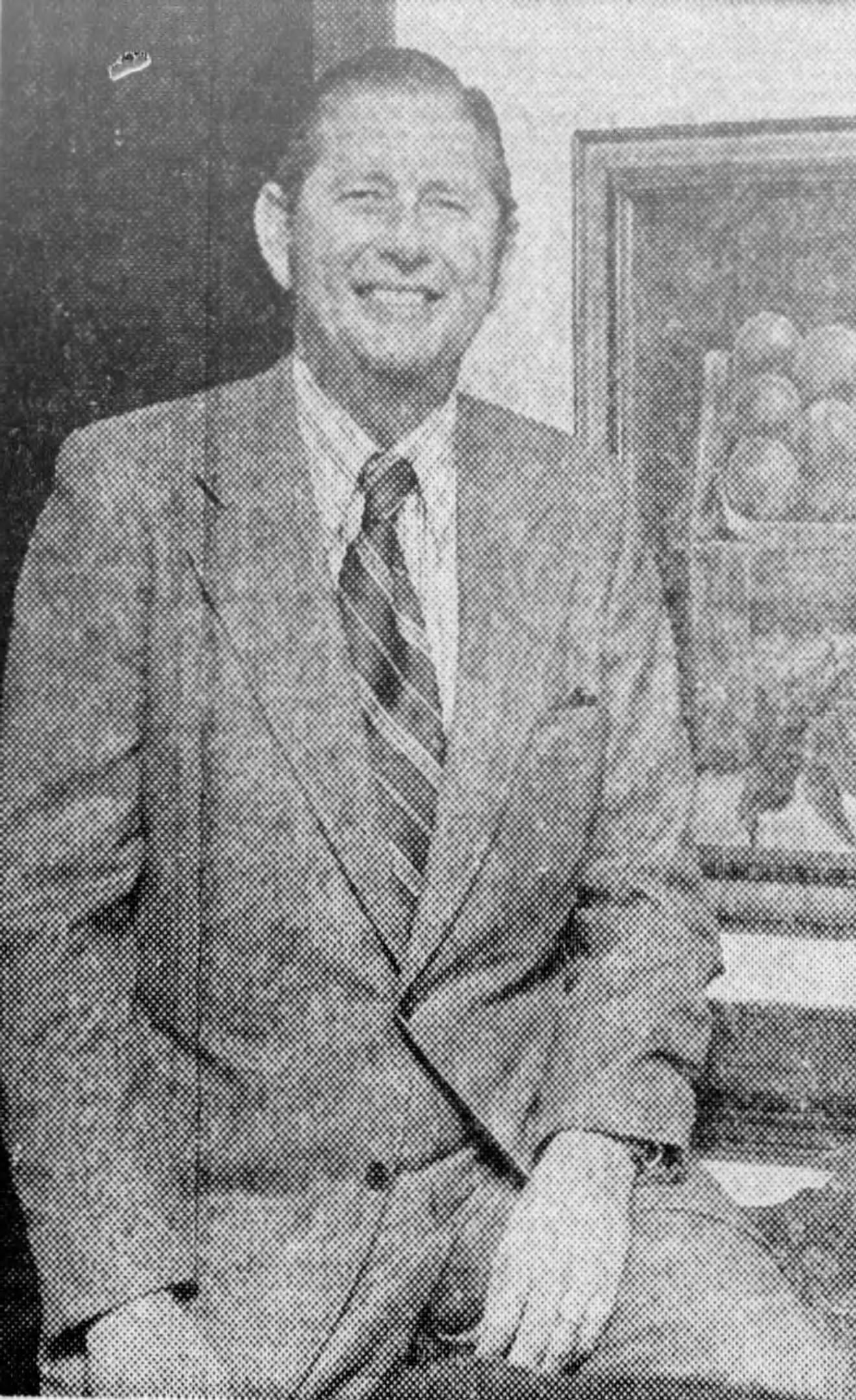
- Smith in 1974

Member of the South Carolina Senate from the 5th district
- In office 1973–2005

Personal details
- Born: January 15, 1925 Greer, South Carolina, U.S.
- Died: December 17, 2006 (aged 81)
- Party: Republican (after 2001)
- Other political affiliations: Democratic (1973–2001)

Jefferson Verne Smith Jr. (January 15, 1925 – December 17, 2006) was an American politician from the state of South Carolina.

== Early life and education ==
Jefferson Verne Smith was born on January 15, 1925, to Jefferson Verne Smith, Sr. and Lillian Farley Smith in Greer, South Carolina. He had two sisters, Nelle Smith Dillard and Frances Smith Wallace, and one brother, W. Thomas Smith. His father, the elder Jefferson, was locally influential in the town of Greer. He died when Smith was 8 years old, causing his mother to take over running the peach orchards they owned.

Smith was educated at Presbyterian College for a year but dropped out after a year, making him the only one of his siblings to not have a college degree. He served in the United States Army from 1943 to 1946 during World War II. Following the war, Smith left his work at the orchards and became a tire seller, earning $45 a week. He later bought into a tire company and invested in the Hercules Tire and Rubber Company, owning the former and becoming the latter's corporate vice president from 1974 to 1986.

== Political career ==
Initially serving on the Greer Commission of Public Works starting in 1966, in 1972, Smith campaigned, and won a seat in the state Senate. He remained in that position until resigning in July 2005, stating that "I thought it was my duty to resign so somebody could get out and get around". At the time, he was second in Senate seniority, behind John W. Drummond.

In 1980, the Smiths hosted a reception at their home for President Jimmy Carter, who was running for re-election. They raised a million dollars for his campaign, and Verne Smith marked the occasion by putting up a plaque in his bathroom which stated, "Jimmy Carter sat here". In 2000, he was one of 37 senators who voted for the South Carolina Heritage Act, a bill to remove the Confederate flag from the South Carolina State House.

Following the 2000 South Carolina Senate election, the Senate was evenly split with 23 Democrats and 23 Republicans. Smith, with lobbying from then-president George W. Bush, switched parties, giving the Republicans a majority in the State Senate for the first time since the Reconstruction era.

He was honored in 2004 by having his portrait hung in the South Carolina State Senate chambers.

== Personal life and death ==
Smith met his wife, Jean Myers Smith, when she was commuting from her home in Simpsonville to teach school in Greer in 1945. They married in 1947. They had two children together, Carole Jean Smith Olmert and Jefferson Verne Smith III. He received the Order of the Palmetto in 1995.

Around June 2005, Smith was diagnosed with myelodysplastic syndrome. He died on December 17, 2006, at the age of 81. His wife had previously died on November 18, 29 days before him.
