= Billy Bean (footballer) =

English footballer

Personal information
- Full name: Alfred Samuel Bean
- Date of birth: 25 August 1915
- Place of birth: Lincoln, England
- Height: 5 ft 8 in (1.73 m)
- Position: Utility player

Senior career*
Years	Team	Apps	(Gls)
19??–1934	Lincoln Corinthians		
1934–1949	Lincoln City	171 (Note: Bean played in three matches in the abandoned 1939–40 Football League season. Joyce includes those appearances, giving Bean a total of 174, but most sources, including his Lincoln City FC Archive statistics, do not (although, inconsistently, his prose profile at that site does).)	(10)
- * Club domestic league appearances and goals

Alfred Samuel Bean (25 August 1915 – 25 November 1993), known as Alf or Billy Bean, was an English footballer who made 171 appearances in the Football League playing for Lincoln City either side of the Second World War. He began his career as an outside left, switched to wing half, and later played even further back, at left back.
