= Alf Young (footballer, born 1900) =

English footballer

Personal information
- Date of birth: 27 November 1900
- Place of birth: Wingate, County Durham, England
- Date of death: 31 July 1975 (aged 74)
- Height: 5 ft 9 1/2 in (1.77 m)
- Position: Half-back

Senior career*
Years	Team	Apps	(Gls)
- Trimdon Grange
- Wingate Albion
1923–1928	Hartlepools United	123	(1)
1928–1929	Gillingham	18	(0)
1929	Workington		
1929–1933	Lincoln City	148	(5)
- * Club domestic league appearances and goals

Alfred Young (27 November 1900 – 31 July 1975) was an English professional association football player of the 1920s.

Born in Wingate, County Durham, he played for local clubs Trimdon Grange and Wingate Albion before joining Hartlepools United in 1923. He made over 120 appearances for the club before he was transferred to Gillingham in 1928. He made 18 Football League appearances for the Kent-based club during the 1928–29 season, but left at the end of the season to join Workington. Later in 1929 he joined Lincoln City and made 148 League appearances for the club, taking his total League appearances to 299. Nothing is known of his career after he left Sincil Bank.
