= Johnny Garvie =

Scottish footballer

Personal information
- Date of birth: 16 October 1927
- Place of birth: Bellshill, Scotland
- Date of death: 3 January 1996 (aged 68)
- Place of death: Corby, England
- Position: Inside right

Youth career
- Carfin Boys Club

Senior career*
Years	Team	Apps	(Gls)
1946–1949	Hibernian	0	(0)
1947–1948	→ Hamilton Academical (loan)	5	(1)
1948–1949	→ Stenhousemuir (loan)	19	(7)
1949–1950	Preston North End	5	(0)
1950–1956	Lincoln City	184	(78)
1956–1957	Carlisle United	25	(6)
1957–1959	Boston United	73	(23)
- Corby Town
- Stamford Town
1962	Ilkeston Town	5	(0)
- * Club domestic league appearances and goals

John Garvie (16 October 1927 – 3 January 1996) was a Scottish professional footballer who scored 87 goals from 237 games playing in the Scottish League for Hamilton Academical and Stenhousemuir and in the English Football League playing for Preston North End, Lincoln City and Carlisle United. He played as an inside right or centre forward.

== Career ==
Garvie was born in Bellshill, Lanarkshire. He began his football career with Hibernian after the Second World War. Though he played on loan for Hamilton Academical and Stenhousemuir in the Scottish League, he never appeared for Hibs' first team. Garvie moved to England to join Second Division club Preston North End in 1949, but made only five first-team appearances for Preston before dropping a division to sign for Lincoln City a year later.

In his first season, Garvie was the club's leading scorer with 21 goals in all competitions, only one more than Andy Graver, with whom he formed a fine goalscoring partnership. He scored another 21 the following season – rather fewer than Graver's 39 – and was ever-present as Lincoln won the Third Division North title in 1951–52. After three seasons of Graver top-scoring for Lincoln, Garvie was leading scorer for the second time in 1954–55, though with only 13 goals as they struggled in the bottom half of the Second Division. In six years with Lincoln, Garvie scored a total of 80 goals from 192 appearances in League and FA Cup. He spent the 1956–57 season with Carlisle United in the Third Division before moving into non-League football.

Garvie joined Boston United, playing in the Midland League, in 1957, resuming his partnership with Graver. In two seasons, he scored 31 goals from 95 games in all competitions, including goals in Boston's first four games in their first season in the Southern League. He then played for Corby Town, Stamford Town, and Ilkeston Town, where he was again reunited with Graver. However, the pair were prevented from renewing their prolific partnership once more by a foot injury which restricted Garvie to just five appearances.

Outside football, Garvie was steward of Corby Trades and Labour Club. He died in January 1996 at the age of 68.
