= Ernie Whittle =

English footballer

Personal information
- Full name: Ernest Whittle
- Date of birth: 25 November 1925
- Place of birth: Lanchester, England
- Date of death: 1998 (aged 72–73)
- Position: Inside forward

Senior career*
Years	Team	Apps	(Gls)
?–1944	South Moor Juniors		
1944–?	Newcastle United	0	(0)
?–1950	Seaham Colliery		
1950–1954	Lincoln City	145	(62)
1954–1956	Workington	110	(44)
1956–1957	Chesterfield	15	(4)
1957–1958	Bradford Park Avenue	18	(6)
1958–1960	Scarborough		
- * Club domestic league appearances and goals

Ernest "Ernie" Whittle (25 November 1925 – 1998) was an English footballer.

He played for South Moor Juniors, Newcastle United, Seaham Colliery, Lincoln City, Workington, Chesterfield, Bradford Park Avenue and Scarborough.
