= Tony Emery =

English footballer

Personal information
- Full name: Anthony John Emery
- Date of birth: 4 November 1927
- Place of birth: Lincoln, England
- Date of death: 5 November 2005 (aged 78)
- Position: Centre half

Youth career
- Lincoln City

Senior career*
Years	Team	Apps	(Gls)
1946–1959	Lincoln City	402	(1)
1959–1961	Mansfield Town	26	(0)
Total		428	(1)
- * Club domestic league appearances and goals

Anthony John Emery (4 November 1927 – 5 November 2005) was an English professional footballer who played as a centre half.

== Career ==
Born in Lincoln, Emery played for Lincoln City and Mansfield Town, making 428 appearances in the Football League.

== Personal life ==
His father Bob and uncle Fred were also footballers.
