= Grant Brown =

English footballer (born 1969)

Personal information
- Full name: Grant Ashley Brown
- Date of birth: 19 November 1969 (age 56)
- Place of birth: Sunderland, England
- Position: Defender

Senior career*
Years	Team	Apps	(Gls)
1988–1989	Leicester City	14	(0)
1989–2002	Lincoln City	407	(15)
2002–2003	Telford United	35	(0)
2003–2005	Alfreton Town	83	(1)
2005	Worksop Town	0	(0)
2005–2006	Grantham Town	42	(6)
Total		581	(22)

Managerial career
- 2005–2012: Lincoln City (Youth team)
- 2007: Lincoln City (joint caretaker)
- 2011: Lincoln City (caretaker)
- 2013: Lincoln City (caretaker)
- 2014: Lincoln City (joint caretaker)
- * Club domestic league appearances and goals

Grant Ashley Brown (born 19 November 1969) is an English football coach and former professional player.

As a player, he was a defender from 1988 to 2006, notably making 407 league appearances for Lincoln City between 1989 and 2002. He also played in the Football League for Leicester City prior to his move to Lincoln. After his departure from Sincil Bank he went on to spend the last four years of his career playing Non-league football for Telford United, Alfreton Town, Worksop Town and Grantham Town. He returned to Lincoln in 2005 as a part-time youth coach whilst still a player with Grantham and at the end of the season he rejoined the Imps on a full-time coaching basis. He has since held the position of both Head of Youth and Assistant manager, as well as being in caretaker charge of the first team on three occasions.

== Playing career ==
After beginning his professional career with Leicester City in 1988, he made 14 appearances for the Foxes before then Lincoln City manager Colin Murphy persuaded him to join the team at Sincil Bank.

Between 1989 and 2002, Grant went on to make a club record 407 league appearances for The Imps, scoring 15 goals. With Lincoln heading into administration, cost-cutting measures saw Brown join four other experienced first-team players in being released at the culmination of the 2001–02 season. In July 2002, Brown agreed a one-year contract to join Telford United. He spent a season with Telford before spending a further two seasons with Alfreton Town.

== Coaching career ==
In July 2005, Grant agreed a deal to join Worksop Town for the 2005–06 season. However, in August 2005 he was appointed Youth Team Coach at Lincoln City, a role which was incompatible with the training requirements at Worksop and so Brown was allowed to cancel his agreement with Worksop and sign instead for Grantham Town. He would spend a season with Grantham before the increasing commitments at Lincoln bought his playing career to an end at the age of 36.

When John Schofield and John Deehan were sacked by Lincoln City on 15 October 2007 following a disappointing start to the 2007–08 season culminating in a 4–0 defeat away to Paul Ince's league leaders, Milton Keynes Dons, Brown was appointed caretaker manager until the appointment of Peter Jackson. Following Jackson's appointment, Brown remained a presence on the bench at first team matches and, when Jackson underwent treatment for throat cancer, Brown assisted Lincoln's temporary manager Iffy Onuora. In the 2008–09 season, Brown reverted to his role with the youth team with Simon Clark moving into a first team coaching role. In July 2009, Brown was promoted to Assistant Head of Youth at the club and in June 2010 succeeded Tom Spall as the Head of Youth, agreeing a two-year contract with the club. He took over as caretaker manager for a second period on 10 October 2011 following the sacking of Steve Tilson. He remained in charge until 24 October when David Holdsworth was appointed. On 3 November 2014, he was once again appointed caretaker manager following the dismissal of Gary Simpson. Following the departure of manager Chris Moyses at the end of the 2015–16 season, Brown left the club on 25 June 2016.

He was appointed academy manager at FCV International Football Academy in July 2016.
