= Boston Town F.C. (1894) =

Boston Town
- Full name: Boston Town
- Nicknames: the Stumpites, Amber and Blacks
- Founded: 1894
- Dissolved: 1933
- Ground: Shodfriars Lane
- 1932–33 (last full season): Midland League, 18th
Home colours

Boston Town F.C. was an English football club based in Boston, Lincolnshire.

== History ==
The club was formed in 1894, and in its first season won the Spalding Cup, plus reached the final of the Lincolnshire Shield.

Although it did not participate in league competition until the 1920s when it joined the Midland League, it entered the FA Cup for the first time in 1900–01. On-field success was rare, however, as the club was drawn against, and lost to, Newark in the First Qualifying Round in each of its first four seasons - by scores of 6–1, 5–1, 4–1 and 4–1 respectively. A 10–1 drubbing at Worksop Town's Central Avenue ground in 1904–05 prompted a six-season hiatus from the competition, before the club registered a first victory in 1913–14 with a 6–0 win over Sneinton (now Carlton Town) in a replay, originally scheduled for the latter's Colwick Road ground, but for some reason switched back to Boston. Reality struck with a 6–1 defeat at Whitwick Imperial in the next ground, and two players (Overton and Manning), plus two club secretaries, were suspended in the aftermath over accounting irregularities - "no real check had apparently been kept on the gate receipts" and "the conduct of the prize draw and whist drives left much to be desired".

Following the First World War, when former local rivals Boston Swifts failed to re-emerge, the club's name reverted to Boston Football Club, and it was under this name that the club initially competed in the Midland League in 1921. Although the "Town" suffix was officially re-adopted in 1924, the club continued to be popularly known simply as Boston until its winding-up a decade later.

During the 1920s it was a force to be reckoned with in league competition, finishing in the top three in three successive years from 1924 to 1927, but it never managed to claim the title. The club did however win the Lincolnshire Senior Cup in 1925–26 beating Lincoln City 2–1 at Sincil Bank, in front of a crowd of nearly 3,000, Jenkinson scoring the winner with a direct free-kick in the 79th minute; three days after its Senior Cup triumph, Boston also won the R.A.F. Trophy, with a 3–2 victory over Scunthorpe United at Spalding.

The club held an extraordinary general meeting on 23 June 1933; at the meeting, it was reported stringent cost-cutting for the 1932–33 season had reduced wages and expenses by £650, but gate receipts also reduced by £450, and the club had made a loss of £162. With the 1933–34 Midland League looking to have six fewer clubs than before, and the wage bill remaining the same, the club required an injection of £200 instantly to continue. As directors had already lost over £1,000 between them, and the club had borrowed £900 from the bank, they resolved unanimously to wind up the club. The new Boston United was formed in its place.

== Colours ==
The club played in the same black and amber common to many other clubs from the town.

== Ground ==
The club originally played at Tower Road, and moved to Shodfriars Lane in September 1898, which it opened with a full gala celebration followed by a match with Basford Rangers.

== Nickname ==
The club's main nickname, the Stumpites, refers to the Boston Stump.

== Honours ==
- Lincolnshire Senior Cup: 1925–26
- R.A.F. Trophy: 1925–26
