= List of Lincoln City F.C. seasons =

The Lincoln City F.C. team of 1889–90, founder members of the Midland League

Lincoln City Football Club, an English association football club based in Lincoln, Lincolnshire, was founded in 1884. The club's first team won the major regional trophy, the Lincolnshire Senior Cup, in the 1886–87 season, and reached the last 16 of the FA Cup in the same year. In 1888, the club joined the Combination, a league set up to provide organised football for those clubs not invited to join the Football League which was to start the same year. However, the Combination was not well organised and folded in April 1889 with many fixtures still outstanding. Lincoln then became founder members of the Midland League, and won the inaugural league title. After two seasons the club turned professional and joined the Football Alliance; the following year they were elected to the newly formed Second Division of the Football League. Their highest finishing position – fifth in the Second Division – was achieved in 1901–02, and in the same season they reached the last 16 of the FA Cup for the third time. Lincoln failed to gain re-election to the League three times between 1909 and 1920; on each occasion, they won the championship of the league to which they had been demoted, either the Midland League or, in 1912, the Central League, and made an immediate return to the Football League.

In 1921, Lincoln were founder members of the Football League Third Division North, and ten seasons later won the division title, thus gaining promotion to the Second Division, though for one season only. In 1947–48, Lincoln again won the Third Division North title, and again suffered immediate relegation from the Second. On regaining Second Division status three years later they remained in the division until the 1960–61 season, but then suffered consecutive relegations. The club website rates 1975–76 as "by far the most successful season in the club's history". They won the Fourth Division title with a record points total for any division before the introduction of three points for a win, set new Fourth Division records for most wins and fewest defeats, and were undefeated at home, with 21 wins and 2 draws.

For many years, teams finishing at the bottom of the Football League had to apply for re-election to the League for the following season – Lincoln made eleven successful applications – but in the 1986–87 season, automatic promotion and relegation was introduced between the Football Conference, the fifth tier of English football, and the Football League Fourth Division. Lincoln finished bottom of the 1986–87 Fourth Division and thus became the first club automatically relegated from the League. They made an immediate return as Conference champions, and until 2011 spent all but one season in the bottom League division. Lincoln reached the promotion play-offs in five consecutive seasons, between 2003 and 2007, but were unsuccessful on each occasion. The 2006–07 season marked Lincoln's 100th season in the Football League; they were the first club to reach that milestone without ever playing in the top division of the League. After a return of only two points from Lincoln's last 11 games of the 2010–11 season, allowing Barnet to overturn an 11-point deficit, they returned to non-League football. Five successive bottom-half finishes in the Conference (renamed the National League for 2015–16) preceded Lincoln's return to the Football League as champions. They combined it with an FA Cup run in which they eliminated three Football League teams, including Championship runners-up Brighton & Hove Albion and Premier League club Burnley. A 1–0 win away at Burnley made them the first non-league club since 1913–14 to reach the quarter-finals; in the quarter-final, they lost 5–0 away to Arsenal. In their first season back, they made their first competitive trip to Wembley Stadium, where they beat Shrewsbury Town 1–0 to win the EFL Trophy, and reached the play-offs, in which they lost to Exeter City. They achieved promotion the following season as champions, and two years later reached but lost in the play-off final.

Since their election to the Football League in 1892, Lincoln have spent 36 seasons in the second tier, 35 in the third, 40 in the fourth, and 10 seasons in non-League football. The table details Lincoln City's achievements in senior first-team competition from their first appearance in the FA Cup in 1884–85 to the end of the most recently completed season.

== Key ==
Key to league record:

- P – Played
- W – Games won
- D – Games drawn
- L – Games lost
- F – Goals for
- A – Goals against
- Pts – Points
- Pos – Final position

Key to colours and symbols:

1st or W	Winners
2nd or F	Runners-up
↑	Promoted
↓	Demoted, either by relegation or by failing to secure re-election to the Football League
♦	Top league scorer in Lincoln's division

Key to competition:

- Combination – The Combination (Note: An attempt was made to set up a league called The Combination involving clubs not invited to join the Football League. Lack of proper organisation meant it was wound up in April 1889 with many fixtures still outstanding. Lincoln City played 14 of their full 16 fixtures.)
- Midland – Midland League
- Alliance – Football Alliance
- Central – The Central League
- Division 2 – Football League Second Division
- Division 3 – Football League Third Division
- Division 3N – Football League Third Division North
- Division 4 – Football League Fourth Division
- League 1 – League One
- League 2 – League Two
- Conference – Conference Premier
- National – National League
- Conf. Champ. Shield – Conference Championship Shield

Key to rounds:

- Prelim – Preliminary round
- Group – Group stage
- QR1 – First qualifying round
- QR2 – Second qualifying round, etc.
- R1 – First round
- R2 – Second round, etc.
- QF – Quarter-final
- SF – Semi-final
- F – Runners-up
- (N) – Northern section of regionalised stage
- DNE – Did not enter

Details of abandoned competitions – The Combination in 1888–89 and the 1939–40 Football League – are shown in italics and appropriately footnoted.

== Seasons ==
List of seasons, including league division and statistics, cup results and top scorer
Season	League									FA Cup (Note: Beginning with the 1925–26 season, the FA Cup was structured so that the third round proper contained 64 teams. Prior to that date, the structure had varied, so rounds are not directly comparable to the round of the same name after 1925. For example, in 1892–93, Lincoln's first season in the Football League, there were only three rounds proper before the semifinal, as compared with the current six.)	League Cup (Note: The League Cup competition started in the 1960–61 season.)	Other		Top scorer(s) (Note: Goals scored in the following first-team competitions are counted: the Combination, Midland League, Football Alliance, the Football League, including play-offs, the Central League, National League and predecessors, FA Cup, League Cup, EFL Trophy and predecessors, Third Division North Cup, Watney Cup, FA Trophy and Conference League Cup. For seasons up to and including 2012–13, sourced to the Lincoln City FC Archive; from 2013–14 to 2016–17, to Soccerway; from 2017–18 onwards, to Soccerbase. Select season required via dropdown menu.)	
Season	Division (Note: Divisions are sorted according to their level within the English football league system at the time.)	Pld	W	D	L	GF	GA	Pts	Pos	FA Cup	League Cup	Competition	Result	Player(s)	Goals
1884–85	—	—	—	—	—	—	—	—	—	R3	—	—	—	Walter Fox	2
1885–86	—	—	—	—	—	—	—	—	—	R1	—	—	—	No goalscorer	—
1886–87	—	—	—	—	—	—	—	—	—	R5	—	—	—	Billy Gregson	2
1887–88	—	—	—	—	—	—	—	—	—	R3	—	—	—	Walter Fox; Slotch Shaw; Jimmy Slater; Edwin Teesdale	1
1888–89	Combination	14	6	2	6	17	19	14		QR1	—	—	—	George Hallam	2
1889–90	Midland	20	16	2	2	75	19	34	1st	R2	—	—	—	Frank Smallman	17
1890–91	Midland	18	7	6	5	34	21	20	3rd	R1	—	—	—	Isaac Moore	16
1891–92	Alliance	22	6	5	11	37	65	17	9th	QR2	—	—	—	John Irving	12
1892–93	Division 2	22	7	3	12	45	51	17	9th	QR4	—	—	—	Frank Smallman	19
1893–94	Division 2	28	11	6	11	59	58	28	8th	QR2	—	—	—	Don Lees	17
1894–95	Division 2	30	10	0	20	52	92	20	13th	QR1	—	—	—	Albert Flewitt	13
1895–96	Division 2	30	9	4	17	53	75	22	13th	QR3	—	—	—	Billie Gillespie	15
1896–97	Division 2	30	5	2	23	27	85	12	16th	QR5	—	—	—	Billie Gillespie	10
1897–98	Division 2	30	6	5	19	43	82	17	14th	QR4	—	—	—	Hugh Robertson	17
1898–99	Division 2	34	12	7	15	51	56	31	12th	QR4	—	—	—	Hugh Robertson	22
1899–1900	Division 2	34	14	12	8	46	43	36	9th	QR3	—	—	—	Jimmy Hartley	16
1900–01	Division 2	34	13	12	7	43	39	33	8th	QR4	—	—	—	Jimmy Hartley	11
1901–02	Division 2	34	14	13	7	45	35	41	5th	R2	—	—	—	Tom McInnes	14
1902–03	Division 2	34	12	12	6	46	53	30	10th	R1	—	—	—	Jimmy Hartley	12
1903–04	Division 2	34	11	12	8	41	58	30	12th	QR3	—	—	—	Freddy Simpson	11
1904–05	Division 2	34	12	12	7	42	40	31	9th	R1	—	—	—	Dennis O'Donnell	15
1905–06	Division 2	38	12	12	6	69	72	30	13th	R2	—	—	—	Jack Martin	20
1906–07	Division 2	38	12	12	4	46	73	28	19th	R2	—	—	—	William Watson	11
1907–08	Division 2 ↓	38	9	3	26	46	83	21	20th (Note: Lincoln finished bottom of the League and failed to be re-elected. After Stoke later resigned from the League, a further election was held in which Lincoln and Tottenham Hotspur twice polled an equal number of votes. "The matter was then left in the hands of the Management Committee, who decided in favour of Tottenham Hotspur.")	R1	—	—	—	Billy Langham	13
1908–09	Midland ↑	38	29	5	4	86	38	63	1st	R1	—	—	—	Billy Langham	22
1909–10	Division 2	38	10	11	17	42	69	31	15th	QR4	—	—	—	William Hunter	8
1910–11	Division 2 (Note: After finishing bottom of the League, Lincoln failed to be re-elected, so joined the newly formed Central League, while their reserve team retained membership of the Midland League.) ↓	38	7	10	21	28	72	24	20th	QR5	—	—	—	Fred Haycock	6
1911–12	Central ↑	32	18	12	2	81	30	48	1st	R2	—	—	—	Walter Miller	21
1912–13	Division 2	38	15	10	13	50	52	40	8th	QR5	—	—	—	Tosh Barrell	13
1913–14	Division 2	38	10	6	22	36	66	26	19th	R1	—	—	—	Billy Egerton	7
1914–15	Division 2	38	11	9	18	46	65	31	16th	R1	—	—	—	Billy Egerton	14
1915–19	The Football League and FA Cup were suspended until after the First World War.														
1919–20	Division 2 (Note: After finishing next to bottom of the League, Lincoln finished fourth in the ballot for election to the two places available. Although the League expanded by forming a Third Division for the following season, the new division was made up of Southern clubs only, mostly from the First Division of the Southern League. In 1921–22, a Third Division North was formed to run in parallel with the Southern section.) ↓	42	9	9	24	44	101	27	21st	R1	—	—	—	Billy Chesser	8
1920–21	Midland ↑	38	27	3	8	95	40	57	1st	R2	—	—	—	Pip Rippon	27
1921–22	Division 3N	38	14	6	18	48	59	34	14th	QR5	—	—	—	Bob Chambers	12
1922–23	Division 3N	38	13	10	15	39	55	36	13th	QR4	—	—	—	Tommy Griffiths; Harry Pringle	7
1923–24	Division 3N	42	10	12	20	48	59	32	19th	QR5	—	—	—	Jimmy Bauchop; Archie Roe	12
1924–25	Division 3N	42	18	8	16	53	58	44	8th	QR5	—	—	—	Harry Pringle	15
1925–26	Division 3N	42	17	5	20	66	82	39	15th	R1	—	—	—	Harry Havelock	18
1926–27	Division 3N	42	15	12	15	90	78	42	11th	R3	—	—	—	Billy Dinsdale	25
1927–28	Division 3N	42	24	7	11	91	64	55	2nd	R3	—	—	—	Billy Dinsdale	29
1928–29	Division 3N	42	21	6	15	91	67	48	6th	R3	—	—	—	Billy Dinsdale	24
1929–30	Division 3N	42	17	14	11	83	61	48	5th	R2	—	—	—	Harry Roberts	21
1930–31	Division 3N	42	25	7	10	102	59	57	2nd	R2	—	—	—	Billy Dinsdale	25
1931–32	Division 3N ↑	40	26	5	9	106	47	57	1st	R2	—	—	—	Allan Hall (Note: Scored 42 goals in the Third Division North.)	45 ♦
1932–33	Division 2	42	12	13	17	72	87	37	18th	R3	—	—	—	Allan Hall	23
1933–34	Division 2 ↓	42	9	8	25	44	75	26	22nd	R3	—	—	—	Chick Reed	7
1934–35	Division 3N	42	22	7	13	87	58	51	4th	R2	—	Football League Third Division North Cup	R1	Johnny Campbell	18
1935–36	Division 3N	42	22	9	11	91	51	53	4th	R1	—	Football League Third Division North Cup	SF	Johnny Campbell	30
1936–37	Division 3N	42	25	7	10	103	57	57	2nd	R2	—	Football League Third Division North Cup	R1	Johnny Campbell	36
1937–38	Division 3N	42	19	8	15	66	50	46	7th	R2	—	Football League Third Division North Cup	R1	Johnny Campbell	14
1938–39	Division 3N	42	12	9	21	66	92	33	17th	R3	—	Football League Third Division North Cup	DNE (Note: Lincoln were one of eight clubs who chose not to enter the Third Division North Cup.)	Walter Ponting	19
1939–40	Division 3N	3	1	1	1	6	7	3	(Note: The 1939–40 season was abandoned with three matches played when the Second World War began. Lincoln City do not include appearances and goals from those three matches in players' career records.)	—	—	—	—	Walter Ponting	3
1939–45	The Football League and FA Cup were suspended until after the Second World War.														
1945–46	—	—	—	—	—	—	—	—	—	R2 (Note: Although the Football League did not resume until the 1946–47 season, the FA Cup was contested in 1945–46. From the first round proper to the sixth round (quarter-final), results were determined on aggregate score over two legs.)	—	—	—	Geoff Marlow	3
1946–47	Division 3N	42	17	5	20	86	87	39	12th	R3	—	—	—	Tommy Cheetham	30
1947–48	Division 3N ↑	42	26	8	8	81	40	60	1st	R1	—	—	—	Jimmy Hutchinson (Note: Scored 32 goals in the Third Division North.)	32 ♦
1948–49	Division 2 ↓	42	8	12	22	53	91	28	22nd (Note: Set a record league attendance of 23,146 against Grimsby Town.)	R3	—	—	—	Jock Dodds	13
1949–50	Division 3N	42	21	9	12	60	39	51	4th	R1	—	—	—	Jock Dodds	21
1950–51	Division 3N	46	25	8	13	89	58	58	5th	R1	—	—	—	Johnny Garvie	21
1951–52	Division 3N ↑	46	30	9	7	121	52	69	1st (Note: Beat Crewe Alexandra 11–1 at home to set a record league victory.)	R3	—	—	—	Andy Graver (Note: Scored 36 goals in the Third Division North.)	39 ♦
1952–53	Division 2	42	11	17	14	64	71	39	15th	R3	—	—	—	Andy Graver	18
1953–54	Division 2	42	14	9	19	65	83	37	16th	R4 (Note: Set a record FA Cup attendance of 23,027 against Preston North End.)	—	—	—	Andy Graver	25
1954–55	Division 2	42	13	10	19	68	79	36	16th	R3	—	—	—	Johnny Garvie	13
1955–56	Division 2	42	18	10	14	79	65	46	8th	R3	—	—	—	Tommy Northcott	20
1956–57	Division 2	42	14	6	22	54	80	34	18th	R3	—	—	—	Tommy Bannan	14
1957–58	Division 2	42	11	9	22	55	82	31	20th	R3	—	—	—	Jack Grainger	10
1958–59	Division 2	42	11	7	24	63	93	29	19th	R3	—	—	—	Roy Chapman	15
1959–60	Division 2	42	16	7	19	75	78	39	13th	R3	—	—	—	John McClelland	18
1960–61	Division 2 ↓	42	8	8	26	48	95	24	22nd	R4	R1^{[A]}	—	—	Roy Chapman	16
1961–62	Division 3 ↓	46	9	17	20	57	87	35	22nd	R1	R2	—	—	Brian Punter	8
1962–63	Division 4	46	13	9	24	68	89	35	22nd	R3	R2	—	—	Brian Punter	17
1963–64	Division 4	46	19	9	18	67	75	47	11th	R3	R3	—	—	Alan Morton	21
1964–65	Division 4	46	11	6	29	58	99	28	22nd	R3	R1	—	—	Bud Houghton	11
1965–66	Division 4	46	13	11	22	57	82	37	22nd	R1	R1	—	—	Barry Hutchinson	20
1966–67	Division 4	46	9	13	24	58	82	31	24th	R1	R3	—	—	Roy Chapman	21
1967–68	Division 4	46	17	9	20	71	68	43	13th	R1	R4 (Note: Set an all-time record attendance of 23,196 against Derby County in the League Cup.)	—	—	Roger Holmes	17
1968–69	Division 4	46	17	17	12	54	52	51	8th	R3	R2	—	—	Dave Smith	11
1969–70	Division 4	46	17	16	13	66	52	50	8th	R2	R1	—	—	Rod Fletcher	17
1970–71	Division 4	46	13	13	20	70	71	39	21st	R3	R3	—	—	Phil Hubbard	19
1971–72	Division 4	46	21	14	11	77	59	56	5th	R1	R3	—	—	Phil Hubbard	19
1972–73	Division 4	46	16	16	14	64	57	48	10th	R1	R1	—	—	Dixie McNeil	21
1973–74	Division 4	46	16	12	18	63	67	44	12th	R1	R1	Watney Cup	R1	Dixie McNeil	19
1974–75	Division 4	46	21	15	10	79	48	57	5th	R3	R1	—	—	Sam Ellis	15
1975–76	Division 4 ↑	46	32	10	4	111	39	74	1st	R4	R3	—	—	John Ward	29
1976–77	Division 3	46	19	14	13	77	70	52	9th	R3	R1	—	—	John Ward	18
1977–78	Division 3	46	15	15	16	53	61	45	16th	R1	R2	—	—	Peter Graham; Mick Harford	9
1978–79	Division 3 ↓	46	7	11	28	41	88	25	24th	R1	R1	—	—	Glenn Cockerill; John Fleming; Mick Harford; Gordon Hobson	6
1979–80	Division 4	46	18	17	11	64	42	53	7th	R1	R1	—	—	Mick Harford	16
1980–81	Division 4 ↑	46	25	15	6	66	25	65	2nd	R2	R2	—	—	Gordon Hobson	21
1981–82	Division 3	46	21	14	11	66	40	77 (Note: The 1981–82 season saw the introduction of three points for a win instead of two.)	4th	R1	R3	Football League Group Cup	Group (Note: Competed in the Football League Group Cup, a successor to the Anglo-Scottish Cup, failing to progress past the group stage in the first season, but reaching the final in the second, losing 3–2 at home to Millwall. The competition was renamed the Football League Trophy for that second season, but is often referred to as the Football League Group Trophy to distinguish from the more recent Football League Trophy, of which it was a forerunner.)	Tony Cunningham; George Shipley	15
1982–83	Division 3	46	23	7	16	77	51	76	6th	R1	R3	Football League Group Trophy	F	Derek Bell	29
1983–84	Division 3	46	17	10	19	59	62	61	14th	R2	R2	Associate Members' Cup	R1(N)	Gordon Hobson	11
1984–85	Division 3	46	11	18	17	50	51	51	19th	R1	R1	Associate Members' Cup	SF(N)	Gordon Hobson	11
1985–86	Division 3 ↓	46	10	16	20	55	77	46	21st	R1	R1	Associate Members' Cup	Prelim(N)	Neil Redfearn; Warren Ward	8
1986–87	Division 4 ↓	46	12	12	22	45	65	48	24th (Note: Lincoln became the first team to suffer automatic relegation to the Conference.)	R1	R2	Associate Members' Cup	R1(N)	Gary Lund	16
1987–88	Conference ↑	42	24	10	8	86	48	82	1st	R2	—	FA Trophy; Conf. League Cup; Conf. Champ. Shield	QF; R3; F	Phil Brown; John McGinley	20
1988–89	Division 4	46	18	10	18	64	60	64	10th	R1	R2	Associate Members' Cup	Prelim(N)	Gordon Hobson	15
1989–90	Division 4	46	18	14	14	48	48	68	10th	R2	R1	Associate Members' Cup	R1(N)	Gordon Hobson	9
1990–91	Division 4	46	14	17	15	50	61	59	14th	R1	R1	Associate Members' Cup	Prelim(N)	Tony Lormor	13
1991–92	Division 4	42	17	11	14	50	44	62	10th	R1	R1	Associate Members' Cup	Prelim(N)	Tony Lormor	9
1992–93	Division 3 (Note: When the newly formed FA Premier League split from the Football League, the remaining divisions of the Football League were renumbered upwards.)	42	18	9	15	57	53	63	8th	R1	R2	Football League Trophy	R1(N)	Jason Lee	12
1993–94	Division 3	42	12	11	19	52	63	47	18th	R2	R2	Football League Trophy	SF(N)	David Johnson	13
1994–95	Division 3	42	15	11	16	54	55	56	12th	R3	R2	Football League Trophy	R2(N)	Gary Bannister; Matt Carbon; Dean West	8
1995–96	Division 3	46	13	14	19	57	73	53	18th	R1	R1	Football League Trophy	QF(N)	Gareth Ainsworth	13
1996–97	Division 3	46	18	12	16	70	69	66	9th	R1	R3	Football League Trophy	R2(N)	Gareth Ainsworth	24
1997–98	Division 3 ↑	46	20	15	11	60	51	75	3rd	R2	R1	Football League Trophy	R1(N)	Lee Thorpe	14
1998–99	Division 2 ↓	46	13	7	26	42	74	46	23rd	R3	R1	Football League Trophy	SF(N)	Tony Battersby; Lee Thorpe	10
1999–2000	Division 3	46	15	14	17	67	69	59	15th	R2	R1	Football League Trophy	R2(N)	Lee Thorpe	17
2000–01	Division 3	46	12	15	19	58	66	51	18th	R2	R1	Football League Trophy	F(N)	Lee Thorpe	13
2001–02	Division 3	46	10	16	20	44	62	46	22nd	R2	R1	Football League Trophy	R1(N)	Lee Thorpe	13
2002–03	Division 3	46	18	16	12	46	37	70	6th (Note: Beat Scunthorpe United 6–3 on aggregate in the semi-final before losing 5–2 to AFC Bournemouth in the 2003 Football League Third Division play-off final.)	R1	R1	Football League Trophy	R2(N)	Ben Futcher	11
2003–04	Division 3	46	19	17	10	68	47	74	7th (Note: Lost 4–3 to Huddersfield Town on aggregate in the play-off semi-finals.)	R2	R1	Football League Trophy	QF(N)	Gary Taylor-Fletcher	19
2004–05	League 2 (Note: Division 3 was renamed League 2 as part of a rebranding exercise by the Football League.)	46	20	12	14	64	47	72	6th (Note: Beat Macclesfield Town 2–1 on aggregate in the semi-final before losing 2–0 to Southend United after extra time in the 2005 Football League Two play-off final.)	R1	R2	Football League Trophy	R1(N)	Simon Yeo	23
2005–06	League 2	46	15	21	10	65	53	66	7th (Note: Lost 3–1 to Grimsby Town on aggregate in the play-off semi-finals.)	R1	R2	Football League Trophy	R1(N)	Marvin Robinson	11
2006–07	League 2	46	21	11	14	70	59	74	5th (Note: Reached the play-offs for the fifth successive season: lost 7–4 on aggregate to Bristol Rovers in the semi-finals.)	R1	R1	Football League Trophy	R1(N)	Jamie Forrester	18
2007–08	League 2	46	18	4	24	61	77	58	15th	R1	R1	Football League Trophy	R2(N)	Ben Wright	15
2008–09	League 2	46	14	17	15	53	52	59	13th	R1	R1	Football League Trophy	R2(N)	Adrian Pătulea	11
2009–10	League 2	46	13	11	22	42	65	50	20th	R3	R1	Football League Trophy	R1(N)	Davide Somma	9
2010–11	League 2 ↓	46	13	8	25	45	81	47	23rd	R2	R1	Football League Trophy	R1(N)	Ashley Grimes	17
2011–12	Conference	46	13	10	23	56	66	49	17th	QR4	—	FA Trophy	R2	Sam Smith	9
2012–13	Conference	46	15	11	20	66	73	56	16th	R2	—	FA Trophy	R1	Jamie Taylor	16
2013–14	Conference	46	17	14	15	60	59	65	14th	R1	—	FA Trophy	R3	Ben Tomlinson	20
2014–15	Conference	46	16	10	20	62	71	58	15th	R1	—	FA Trophy	R1	Ben Tomlinson	14
2015–16	National (Note: The Football Conference was renamed the National League.)	46	16	13	17	69	68	61	13th	R1	—	FA Trophy	R1	Matt Rhead	23
2016–17	National ↑	46	30	9	7	83	40	99	1st	QF	—	FA Trophy	SF	Matt Rhead	15
2017–18	League 2	46	20	15	11	64	48	75	7th (Note: Lost to Exeter City 3–1 on aggregate in the play-off semi-final.)	R1	R1	EFL Trophy	W (Note: Beat Shrewsbury Town 1–0 in the 2018 EFL Trophy Final at Wembley.)	Matt Green	17
2018–19	League 2 ↑	46	23	16	7	73	43	85	1st	R3	R2	EFL Trophy	R2	John Akinde	17
2019–20	League 1	35	12	6	17	44	46	42	16th (Note: The 2019–20 football season was disrupted by the effects of the COVID-19 pandemic. The EFL was suspended in March 2020 and in June, the League One clubs voted to end the regular season programme early. Teams had not all played the same number of matches, so it was agreed to construct final league tables on a points-per-game basis. Lincoln City's 52.80 points per game placed them 16th.)	R1	R2	EFL Trophy	R1(N)	Tyler Walker	16
2020–21	League 1	46	22	11	13	69	50	77	5th (Note: After beating Sunderland 3–2 on aggregate in the play-off semi-final, lost 2–1 to Blackpool in the final.)	R2	R3	EFL Trophy	SF	Jorge Grant; Anthony Scully	17
2021–22	League 1	46	14	10	22	55	63	52	17th	R2	R1	EFL Trophy	R2(N)	Anthony Scully	15
2022–23	League 1	46	14	20	12	47	47	62	11th	R1	R4	EFL Trophy	QF	Ben House	13
2023–24	League 1	46	20	14	12	65	40	74	7th	R1	R3	EFL Trophy	R2	Joe Taylor	13
2024–25	League 1	46	16	13	17	64	56	61	11th	R3	R1	EFL Trophy	R3	Jovon Makama	11
2025–26	League 1 ↑	46	31	10	5	89	41	103	1st	R1	R3	EFL Trophy	R2	Reeco Hackett; Jack Moylan; Rob Street	12
