= Brierfield F.C. =

Former association football club in Lancashire

Brierfield
- Full name: Brierfield Football Club
- Nickname: the Stumpites
- Founded: 1882
- Dissolved: 1895
- Chairman: J. W. Midgeley
- Secretary: J. M. Latham
colours

Brierfield Football Club was an association football club from Brierfield, Lancashire.

== History ==
The Brierfield club entered the Lancashire Senior Cup from 1882–83 to 1884–85, but suffered double digit defeats in its three ties, ending with a 14–0 defeat to Preston Zingari. After the 1884–85 season, the club resolved solely to rely on members as players rather than recruit outsiders, and it stepped back from the senior game.

The club formally broke up after the 1887–88 season, but was quickly resurrected, and was one of the founder members of the North-East Lancashire League in 1889–90, It finished the season as the inaugural champions, despite an administrative error by the club resulting in a 4 point deduction, after it fielded two players (Mason and Duerden) in two matches without the consent of the league executive. The club took the title by beating Burnley Union Star 8–5 in an astonishing final match, before a crowd of 2,000, Brierfield coming from 5–1 down at half-time by scoring six goals in ten minutes.

The club did not gain election to the Lancashire League, but was considered by the ambitious Union Star as a suitable member of a new Lancashire Alliance; however, as Union Star secured membership of the Lancashire League, any such plans were abortive.

The club was known as the "champion protesters" for its willingness and ability to succeed in protests against other sides, notably in the 1888–89 Lancashire Junior Cup, where it lost in the first and third rounds, but both times overturned the result for successful replays, and in the fourth round succeeded in two protests, albeit finally going down 3–0 to Clitheroe.

Despite a fortnight suspension in October 1892 for making illegal approaches to two players (Halstead of Bell's Temperance and Ireland of Oswaldtwistle), the club remained a member of the North-East Lancashire League until 1894, when the competition merged with the Lancashire Combination, and Brierfield was one of the 14 clubs accepted as a member for 1894–95. However the club withdrew before the season started, amid "dissensions" which saw most of the club's committee resign, and the club join the Burnley & District League as an amateur outfit instead. The club's competitive career concluded with a disastrous 12–0 defeat to Ashton North End in the Lancashire Junior Cup in January 1895 and its last activity was hosting an athletics sports that July.

== Colours ==
The club's colours were navy blue and white, from 1892 in the format of navy blue jerseys with a white sash, and white "pants".

== Ground ==
The club's ground was simply known as the Brierfield Football Ground; one indication of financial difficulties was shown when the club secretary was summoned to the assizes for non-payment of rent in 1894 - his successful defence was that the entire committee was responsible.

== Nickname ==
The club's nickname of the Stumpites was derived from the Brierfield Stump, a 2-ton water trough made of stone, which stood in the town's market square from the 1840s to 1942.

== Notable players ==
- James Cockshutt, who played for the club in 1892–93 and later for Grimsby Town
- James McConnell, a former Burnley player
