= Colne and District F.C. =

1880s association football club

- Full name: Colne and District Football Club
- Nicknames: the Hillites, the Croftites
- Founded: 1882
- Dissolved: 1891
- Ground: the Horsfield
- President: James Carr
- Secretary: Walter Townson

Colne and District F.C. (originally known as Colne F.C., and normally referred to simply as Colne) was an association football club from Colne, Lancashire, active in the 1880s.

== History ==
The club was playing at least from the 1882–83 season; in 1883–84, it made a loss of £7. It was originally an offshoot of the Colne Cricket Club, but the arrangement had dissolved by 1885.

In 1886, it placed adverts for a lottery with the Burnley Gazette, but, as the lottery turned out to be illegal, did not pay the cost of the adverts. The Gazette was barred from recovering damages as it was a party to illegal conduct. It also raised money by going on tour to Scotland at Christmas 1886. Its best run in the Lancashire Junior Cup came in 1887–88, when it reached the third round, but was eliminated by eventual competition winner Blackpool, with the club unable to field its best side because of the long journey to the coast. The club did not take the competition seriously afterwards, as it lost money on its ties, and only entered with its second XI.

The club's entire existence was plagued by financial difficulties. At the end of the 1887–88 season, there were rumours that the club would collapse with estimated debts of £170, and the club underwent a re-organization to put itself on a sounder basis, which also included changing the name to Colne and District, and absorbing the Primet Bridge and Waterside clubs. However, the club did not generate much in the way of local support, and by the season's end, to save on expenses, the club had gone from mostly "District" to exclusively "town". By April 1889 debts were running at £190. and the club's landlord seized its grandstand in lieu of £20 unpaid rent.

=== Joining a league ===
In July 1889, the club cleared its debts by reaching an agreement with creditors to accept 25% of the amount owing, and it became a founder member of the North-east Lancashire League in 1889–90. The club's new ground was more central to the town, and, with a higher standard of regular football, the gates increased to the extent that the club was able to employ 7 professionals, including goalkeeper Kay and full-back Place from Burnley. However its hopes were soon checked by a 10–0 defeat at Darwen Rovers in the club's third match of the season, watched by a crowd of twelve. The club recovered enough to finish 6th out of 11.

The club doubled down for the 1890–91 season, as, having turned a profit in the 1889–90 season, it recruited three professional full-backs from Preston North End reserves (Smith) and Burnley (Pollard and Robert McCree), as well as others from local non-league teams. However, after the club struggled in the table, a report to the club's committee in February 1891 recommended the club withdraw from the North-east Lancashire League and step back to local football. The gate money for the season thus far was half of what it had been in 1889–90, and did not cover the expenses of each match. The club also blamed visiting clubs for late arrivals at Colne's ground - spectators would drift away to games at Burnley or Nelson, so would not pay admission, and even the club's members were not paying their dues, with 72 of its 142 members in 1890–91 not paying their full subscriptions. Further, the club's travel expenses were significant, as Colne was at the extreme end of the North-east Lancashire's geographical spread. Consequently, the club did not finish the 1890–91 season, and its North-east Lancashire League record (5 wins from 19 matches, and only ahead of Darwen Rovers) was expunged.

In May 1891, club secretary Towson - who had been the victim of a vicious assault in early 1890, attacked by a trespasser, William Tackler, whom Towson was trying to remove from Towson's uncle's house, for which Tackler was sentenced to 2 months in prison - decided enough was enough, and resigned.

The club was wound up before the 1891–92 season, with a new Colne F.C. - specifically for Colne-based players, as the Colne & District club was considered "nearly all district and very little Colne" - proposed in September 1891, and another club, Colne North End, picked up many of the club's players.

== Ground ==
The club's original ground was Greenfields. In 1885 it moved to a ground at Langroyd Road, and hosted a competition for sides representing the local industries to raise the £100 required for a grandstand. The distance from the town centre (and cold winds blowing through) proved unsatisfactory, and before the 1889–90 it moved to the Horsfield on Swan Croft.
