= Thomas Griffiths =

Thomas, Tom, or Tommy Griffiths may refer to:

== Arts, science, and academia ==
- Thomas Vernon Griffiths (1894–1985), New Zealand music teacher and lecturer, composer
- Tom Griffiths (cognitive scientist), professor who heads Princeton's Computational Cognitive Science lab
- Tom Griffiths (historian), Australian historian and author

== Religion ==
- Thomas Griffiths (bishop) (1791–1847), English Roman Catholic bishop
- Thomas Griffiths (priest) (born 1897), Welsh Anglican priest

== Sport ==
- Thomas Griffiths (footballer, born 1906) (1906–1981), Welsh footballer
- Tom Griffiths (footballer, born 1888) (1888–?), English footballer
- Tom Griffiths (rugby union) (born 1995), English rugby union player
- Tommy Griffiths (footballer, born 1901) (1901–1950), English footballer
- Tom Griffiths (bowls), Welsh bowls player

== Others ==
- T. Ras Makonnen (died 1983), Guyanese-born activist, born Thomas Griffiths
- Thomas Griffiths (general) (1865–1947), Australian Army colonel and temporary Brigadier General in World War I
- Thomas Griffiths (politician) (1867–1955), Welsh Labour Member of Parliament for Pontypool
- Tommy Griffiths (radio personality), former host of Rumble in the Morning radio program

== See also ==
- Thomas Griffith (disambiguation)
- Thomas Griffiths Wainewright (1794–1847), English journalist and subject-painter
