= Haslingden F.C. (1891) =

Football club in Lancashire (1891–1917)

Haslingden
- Full name: Haslingden Football Club
- Founded: 1891
- Dissolved: 1917
- Ground: Clarence Ground
Original colours	Final colours

Haslingden Football Club was an association football club from Haslingden, Lancashire, active at the turn of the 20th century.

== History ==
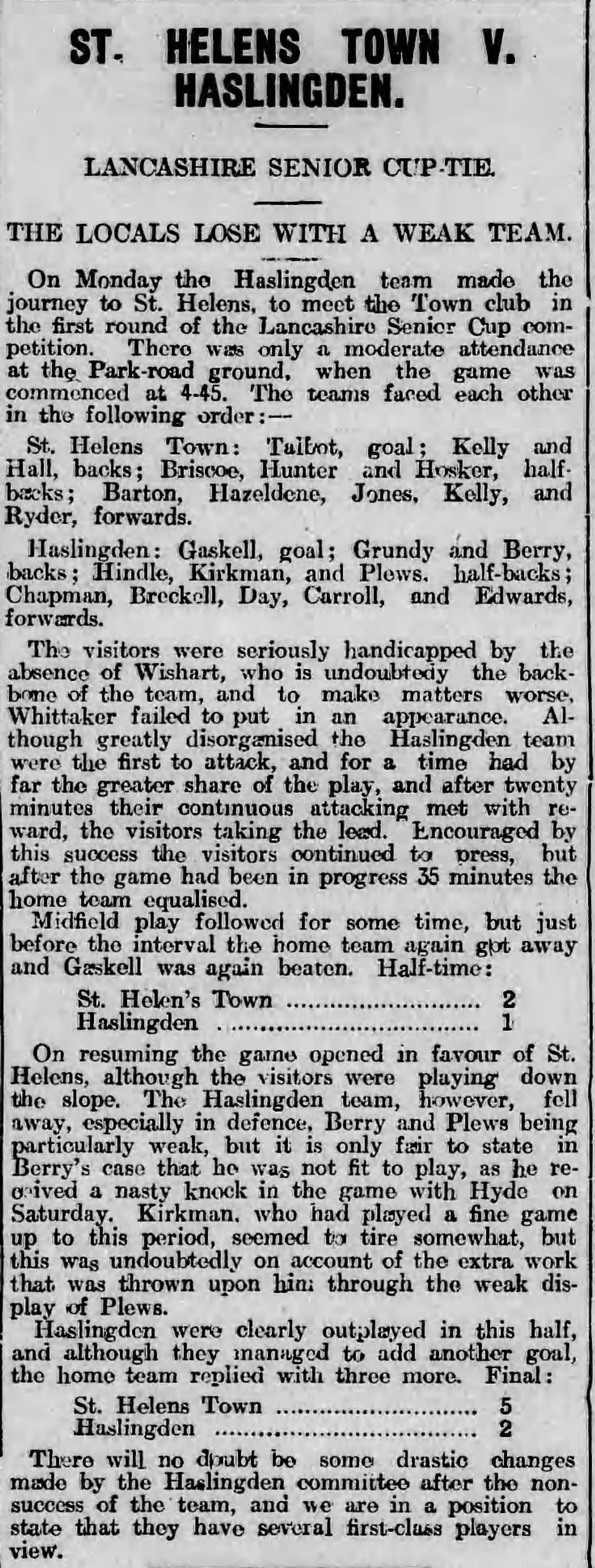
1913–14 Lancashire Senior Cup 1st Round, St Helens Town 5–2 Haslingden, Ramsbottom Observer, 26 September 1913

The club was formed as Haslingden Red Star in around 1891. The club changed its name to Haslingden at the start of the 1897–98 season Under its new name it won its first success, winning the Rossendale Charity Cup for 1897–98, with a side made up purely of Haslingden players.

After finishing second in the Central Lancashire League in 1904–05, the club applied to join the Lancashire Combination second division for 1905–06, originally unsuccessfully, but it was admitted after threats from clubs in the north-east of the county to set up an alternative competition. After two seasons of struggling, the club moved towards the top of the division, finally winning it in 1910–11. Its top flight tenure lasted just three seasons, the club finishing 16th out of 18 in 1913–14, having sold centre-forward Day, who had scored 27 goals in 13 matches, to Queen's Park Rangers at the start of the season. Relegation caused the club financial difficulties as it had just about broken even in the top flight, but ran a debt of £58.

Despite this tenure, the club had only been playing in the Lancashire Junior Cup, rather than the senior, and finished runner-up in 1912–13 to Fleetwood. A protest against the eligibility of one of the Fleetwood players (Frank Saul) was withdrawn when Haslingden realised that it had mistaken "F. Saul" for "T. Saul". This run however qualified the club for the Lancashire Senior Cup, albeit its one tie in the competition (in the first round in 1913–14) was a defeat at St Helens Town.

It has also been playing in the qualifying rounds of the FA Cup, its best run being to the 4th (and penultimate) qualifying round in 1907–08, 1909–10, and 1910–11. The club lost firstly to St Helens Recs and in the other ties at home to Accrington Stanley, both times by a single goal.

The club continued into the 1915–16 season in which the Combination would split into two geographical zones, and complete one set of fixtures by the end of the calendar year followed by a "subsidiary" competition. Haslingden finished 3rd in the Northern section, but then decided to cease for the period of the First World War hostilities. Perhaps not coincidentally, the club had also been reported to the Lancashire Football Association in October 1915 after a referee was "stoned and sodded" for giving a late penalty decision against Haslingden in a match with Padiham, and it had to play one Combination match away from home as a result. However, in March 1917, the club's grandstand was destroyed after a severe blizzard, and the club seems to have given up operations at that point.

== Colours ==
The club originally wore blue jerseys; by 1907 the club wore blue and white striped jerseys with white knickers.

== Ground ==
The club's ground was known as the Clarence Ground, which was the former ground of Haslingden Church Institute F.C., and was on Helmshore Road, rented from a Mr Isherwood.

== Notable players ==
- Former players ( 12 )
