= Parr A.F.C. =

Former association football club in Lancashire

- Full name: Parr Association Football Club
- Founded: 1894
- Dissolved: 1901
- Ground: Park Road
- Secretary: William Thompson
Home colours

Parr A.F.C. was an association football club from St Helens, Merseyside.

== History ==
The club's first reported match is from October 1894, and in 1895 it joined the West Lancashire & District League. The club suffered a tragedy at the end of 1895, when left-winger Thomas Duerden, a miner, died at Ashton Green Colliery, after he was struck by a large rock falling off the colliery roof.

Parr won the West Lancashire & District League in 1895–96, 1896–97, and 1897–98. It applied to join the Lancashire Alliance in November 1897 to replace the ailing Hindley, but was beaten in the ballot by Prescot - Parr's campaign was not helped by Parr not sending any representatives to the key meeting; however in 1898 the club accepted an invitation to join the competition.

The club's greatest season was 1900–01, when it reached the final of the Lancashire Junior Cup, losing 2–0 to Heywood in the final at Deepdale before 1,000 spectators, with the heavier Parr side unable to cope with the nimbler footwork of its opponent.

The club gained considerable consolation by winning the Alliance title, but, despite this success, the 1900–01 season proved the be the club's last, as it did not turn up to the Lancashire Alliance annual general meeting to arrange the fixtures for the 1901–02 season. It formally wound up in August 1901, the reason given being a dying out of local interest. However, a new club, St Helens Town, was promptly founded in the same parish, and of Parr's Junior final XI, goalkeeper Hoy, brothers R. and G. Lee, forward Halpin, and full-back Stirrup are found playing for Town in the following seasons. The Parr name was revived in 1902 to little effect.

== Colours ==
The club wore red and black jerseys, with black knickers.

== Ground ==
The club played at Park Road, which was also the location of St Helens Town's Primrose Ground, and which may have been the same ground.
