= Clitheroe Central F.C. =

Defunct UK football club from Lancashire

- Nicknames: the Castleites, the Clarets
- Founded: 1894
- Dissolved: 1910
- Ground: Waterloo Ground
Home colours

Clitheroe Central F.C. was an association football club from Clitheroe, Lancashire, active in the early 20th century.

== History ==
=== First use of name ===
The first Clitheroe Central Swan Hotel was founded at a meeting in Castle Street in 1891 as a split from the existing Clitheroe Football Club, the club being made up mostly of local, amateur, players while the professionals remained with the parent club. In order to prevent the new club gaining traction, Clitheroe reported Central to the Lancashire Football Association for poaching players before Central had even played a match, with the result that a number of players sat out a short suspension.

As a result, the club did not make its debut until late February, beating Hurst Green in a friendly at the Clitheroe ground; 9 of the players had been regulars for Clitheroe the previous season, but had hardly played in 1890–91, eased out by the "imports". However, a 6–1 hammering at the hands of a Clitheroe reserve XI effectively ended the first incarnation.

=== Clitheroe Congregational ===
The instant club was founded in 1894, by the Reverend R. A. Boothman, under the name Market Place Rovers. The name may have been inspired by a boys' team which had been set up in 1889 by John Topping, who was also a founder member of the 1894 set-up, and was captain of the club under its various guises until 1904.

In 1900 the club changed its name to Clitheroe Congregational, by which time it was playing in the Blackburn & District Sunday School League; in 1900–01, the club won a local "treble" by taking the Sunday School League, Cup, and North-east Lancashire Charity Shield.

The club took a step up in 1902, changing its name to Clitheroe Central, and entering the 1902–03 Lancashire Junior Cup. The Cup entry had given the club a higher profile, and within two months was complaining about players being "poached" while under contract. The club's Junior Cup run only ended at the semi-final stage, with a 3–0 defeat at Lytham Institute, a protest against the defeat being dismissed as being frivolous.

=== Lancashire Combination ===
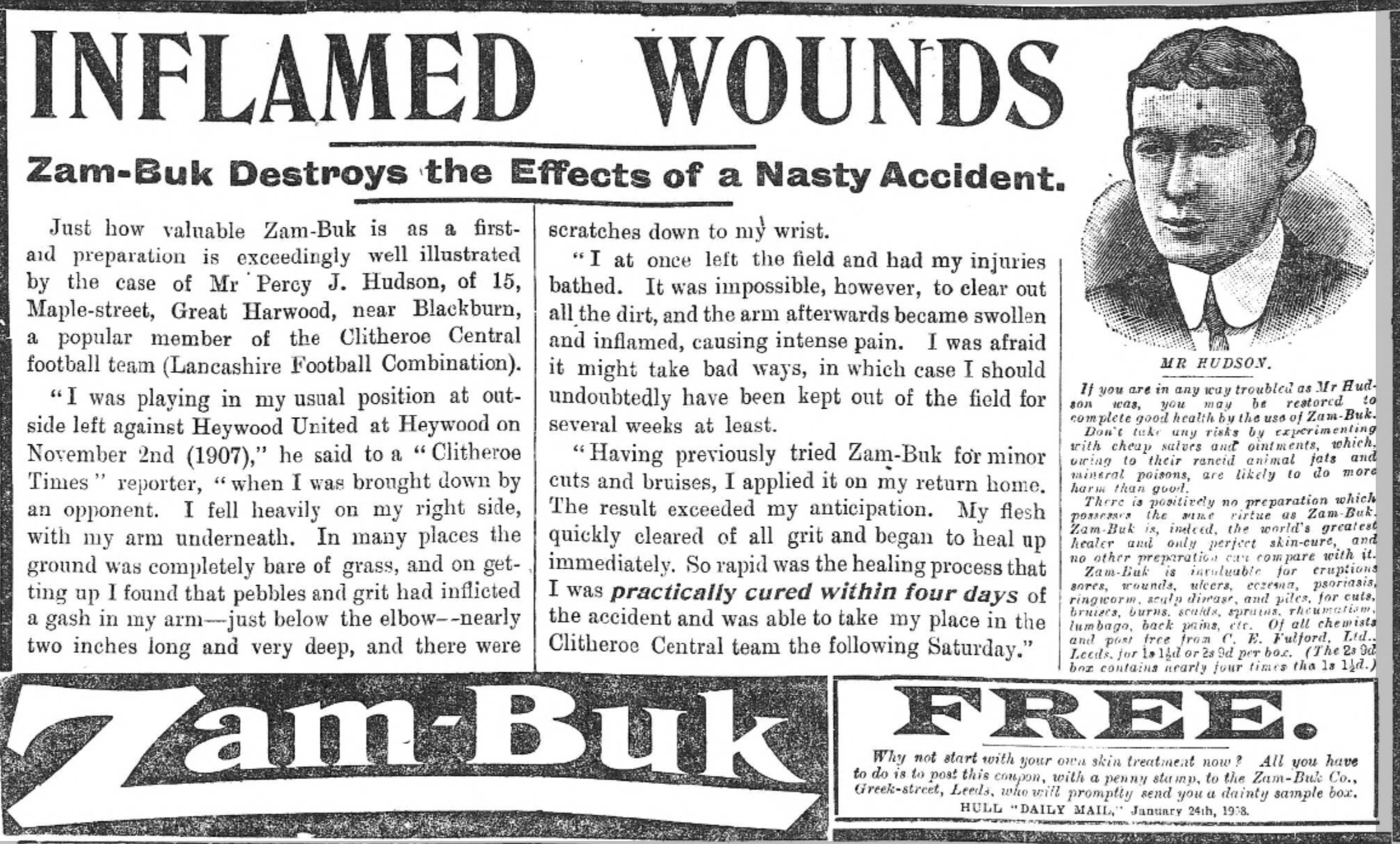
A nationwide advert for Zam-Buk ointment, featuring forward Percy Hudson, Hull Daily Mail, 24 January 1908

The club joined the Lancashire Combination in 1903 in the second division; it failed re-election after just one season, to the dismay of the club, which had already signed up players in anticipation of re-election; Central was particularly unlucky, as on the first ballot it had come equal fourth (for the four places available) with Bacup, which had finished the season bottom (and 12 points behind Central), but on a re-vote Bacup gained the nod. The club spent the 1904–05 season playing in the North-East Lancashire Combination and reached the League Shield final; after a 1–1 home draw against Blackburn St Philip's, Clitheroe threatened to forfeit the tie on the basis that the travel expenses would exceed the gate share, and when the replay did take place, St Philip's won 3–1, the Castleites not bothering to send a representative to collect the medals at the Combination's annual general meeting in July.

The club was re-elected to the Combination for 1905–06, which enabled the club to survive; the committee intended to wind the club up if it did not win its place back, on the basis that it was "practically suicidal" to run a club in the North-East competition, as the expenses were as high as the Lancashire, but the gates were minimal. The differences in finance in being a member of the Combination was shown by the club's gate income in 1904–05 being a mere £85 15/, but that for 1906–07 - as a Combination member - was £263, although wages had gone from £71 to £271. With the more professional and part-time environment having stabilised, the club formed a limited liability company in October 1907, with capital of £250.

It entered the qualifying rounds of the FA Cup for the first time in 1908–09, having to start in an Extra Preliminary Round against Great Harwood, winning two ties to reach the First Qualifying Round, at which stage the Castleites lost 4–0 at Chorley. In 1909–10, skipped the Extra Preliminary Round, and a win over Bacup saw it reached the First Qualifying Round. The defeat at that stage at Darwen was its last FA Cup match; worse, Clitheroe was fined £1 for fielding a reserve side in the Combination while the first XI was playing Darwen, the Castleites forced to do double-duty as Lancaster refused to postpone the Combination match and threatened to ask for compensation.

Early in the season, in a Combination match, the club scored a late winner at home to Barrow, which led to the death of William Lofthouse, a 71-year-old insurance agent, who had been watching the match from a house where he was making a business call; as he left, he heard the cheers, asked if Clitheroe had scored again, and fell dead of a heart attack.

=== Winding-up ===
In 1910 the club was wound up and withdrawn from the Combination because of the lack of geographical exclusivity. As the board meeting had been held without reference to the shareholders, a further meeting was called, but Clitheroe Central's resignation from the Combination was held to be binding, the players awarded free transfers, and the winding-up proceeded. Despite the club's lack of success, those in Clitheroe did not ultimately regret the decision, as the Combination "from the point of view of representing East Lancashire football was a mere travesty, and whose standard of football had so grievously deteriorated"

The club had entered the 1910–11 FA Cup qualifying rounds, and been drawn to visit Darwen, but there was no club left to take the fixture; the club's last action was to pay compensation to the club's goalkeeper Harry Finch, whose leg had been broken at the start of the year in a match at Bacup, and who was entitled to damages under the Workmen's Compensation Act.

== Colours ==
The club originally wore green, changing to claret and blue by the 1906–07 season.

== Ground ==
The club originally played at the Shawbridge ground. In 1906 it moved to the Waterloo Ground, behind Waterloo Mill, on Salthill Road.

== Notable players ==
- Rupert Cawthorne, centre-half, who played for Darwen in the Football League, and joined Congregational in 1900, staying loyal to Central until the 1906–07 season.
- Tommy Griffiths, who played for the club before joining Blackburn Rovers.
