= North-east Lancashire League =

- Founded: 1889
- Abolished: 1895
- Region: England
- Teams: 10–12
- Most championships: Accrington reserves/Burnley reserves, 2 titles each

The North-East Lancashire League was an association football competition for clubs in Lancashire, which ran from 1889 to 1894.

== History ==
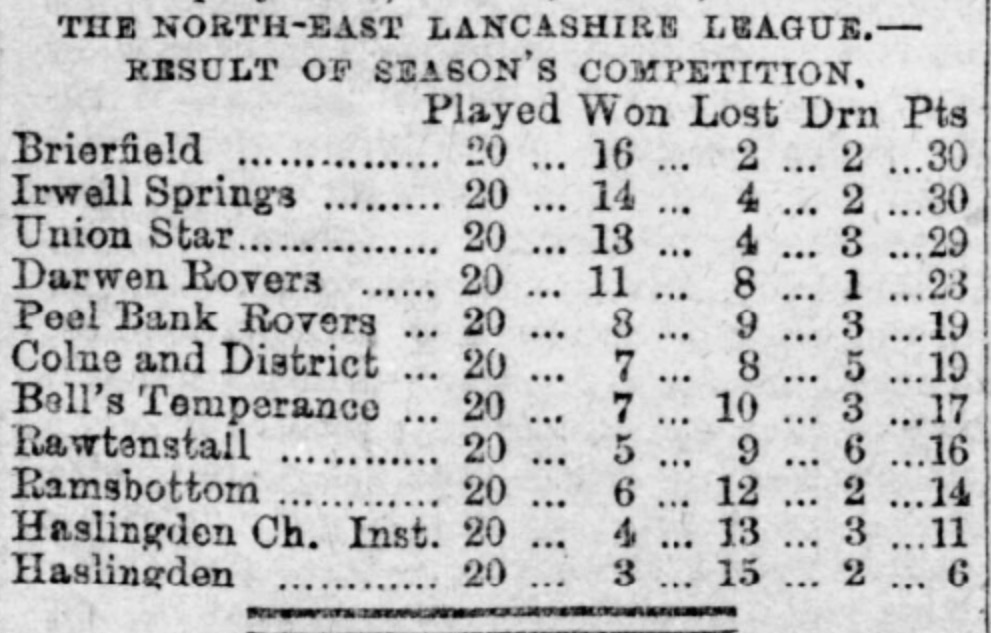
1889–90 North-east Lancashire League final table, Burnley Express, 14 May 1890. Brierfield had been deducted 4 points due to player registration errors but took the title on goal average.

=== Original members ===
The League was founded on 2 May 1889 at a meeting at the Bridge Inn, Accrington, with 12 original members:

- Bell's Temperance
- Brierfield
- Burnley Union Star
- Colne and District
- Darwen Rovers
- Haslingden Association
- Haslingden Church Institute
- Irwell Springs (changed name to Bacup in 1892)
- Padiham
- Peel Bank Rovers (changed name to Church in 1891, but reverted to Peel Bank Rovers in 1892)
- Ramsbottom
- Rawtenstall

Clitheroe was also meant to be a member, but withdrew before the season started.

The first champion was Brierfield, despite a 4 point deduction for fielding ineligible players, on goal average from Irwell Springs, with an 8–5 win over Burnley Union Star in its final match, coming from 5–1 down at half-time by scoring six goals in ten minutes.

=== Subsequent seasons ===
Reserve sides of Football League clubs were allowed into the competition from 1890–91, which caused problems for clubs fielding their first teams - Accrington for instance bolstering their XI with several first-team players when necessary - and the other titles were won by reserve sides. Accrington's reserves win in 1890–91 (having won its first 15 games) and 1891–92, and Burnley's reserve side, Burnley Swifts, took the next two titles. The 1893–94 season was the League's last, as, at the season end, it was absorbed into the Lancashire Combination; the competition had already been undermined when Bacup (the re-named Irwell Springs) had been elevated into the Lancashire League after 11 games in the season, at which point it had won 9 times.

== Membership changes ==
Year	Teams leaving	Teams joining
1890–91	Bell's Temperance, Burnley Union Star, Haslingden Association, Padiham	Accrington reserves, Blackburn Rovers reserves, Burnley Swifts, Clitheroe
1891–92	Darwen Rovers, Haslingden Church Institute; Blackburn Rovers reserves and Colne did not complete the previous season	Bell's Temperance, Darwen reserves, Oswaldtwistle Rovers, Padiham
1892–93	Darwen reserves	Haslingden Association
1893–94	Peel Bank Rovers, Haslingden Association	none
