= Tom Wagstaffe =

Indian-born English footballer

Personal information
- Full name: Thomas Daniel Wagstaffe
- Place of birth: Danapur, India
- Height: 5 ft 7 in (1.70 m)
- Position: Inside forward

Senior career*
Years	Team	Apps	(Gls)
1922	Fleetwood		
1922–1923	Sunderland	2	(0)
1924–1925	Fleetwood		
1925–1926	Morecambe		
1926–1927	Crewe Alexandra	3	(1)
1927–19??	Mossley		
- * Club domestic league appearances and goals

Thomas Daniel Wagstaffe was an English professional footballer who played as an inside forward for Sunderland.
