= Haslingden Association F.C. =

Haslingden Association
- Full name: Haslingden Association Football Club
- Founded: 1876
- Dissolved: 1893
- Ground: Rye Hill
Home colours

Haslingden Association FC was an English association football club based in Haslingden, Lancashire.

== History ==
The club was founded in 1876, by youngsters who did not stick to any particular code, but played both association and rugby; in 1878, with the association game grew, they abandoned rugby, and added the Association epithet to distinguish it from neighbours Haslingden Grane. The club was an original member of the Lancashire Football Association, taking part in the first Lancashire Senior Cup in 1879–80. The club beat Padiham in the first round - indeed, the first tie in the competition to be played, in front of 1,400 spectators at Padiham - but was beaten 12–1 by Darwen in the second. The scoreline would have been worse but Darwen agreed for three disputed goals not to be counted.

The club did not enter the competition again until 1882, losing in the first round to Greenwood's Millers, but, despite the club's low-key presence, it entered the FA Cup in the same season. Thanks to the Football Association forgetting to include the club in the first round draw, Association was given a bye to the second round. The club was drawn to play Darwen Ramblers away, and, after the referee refused a Haslingden claim of offside for a late winning goal for the Ramblers, the club walked off the pitch.

The club's FA membership lapsed from the 1883–84 season; the club remained a member of the Lancashire Association, but entered the junior rather than the senior cup. The club was a founder member of the North-East Lancashire League in 1889; it was however £20 in debt, and spending £50 on wages against gate income of under £120.

The club appears to have dissolved after finishing near the bottom of the League in 1892–93, the season including a 13–0 defeat by Burnley's reserve side Burnley Swifts, and having been excluded from the competition after the league cut down from 12 clubs to 10. A Haslingden club lost in the first round of the Lancashire Junior Cup in 1897 but this was a re-named Haslingden Red Star.

== Colours ==
The earliest cited colours for the club, from the 1878–79 season, are maroon and white shirts, white knickerbockers and socks. The following season the club changed to navy blue shirts, knickers, and socks.

== Ground ==
The club originally played at Rye Hill, but from 1880–81 moved to the Show Ground, Flaxmoss.

== Notable player ==
- Jonty Entwistle, who later played for Accrington and Darwen in the Football League.
