= 1884–85 Bolton Wanderers F.C. season =

Bolton Wanderers
1884–85 season
- Secretary: Tom Rawthorne
Home colours

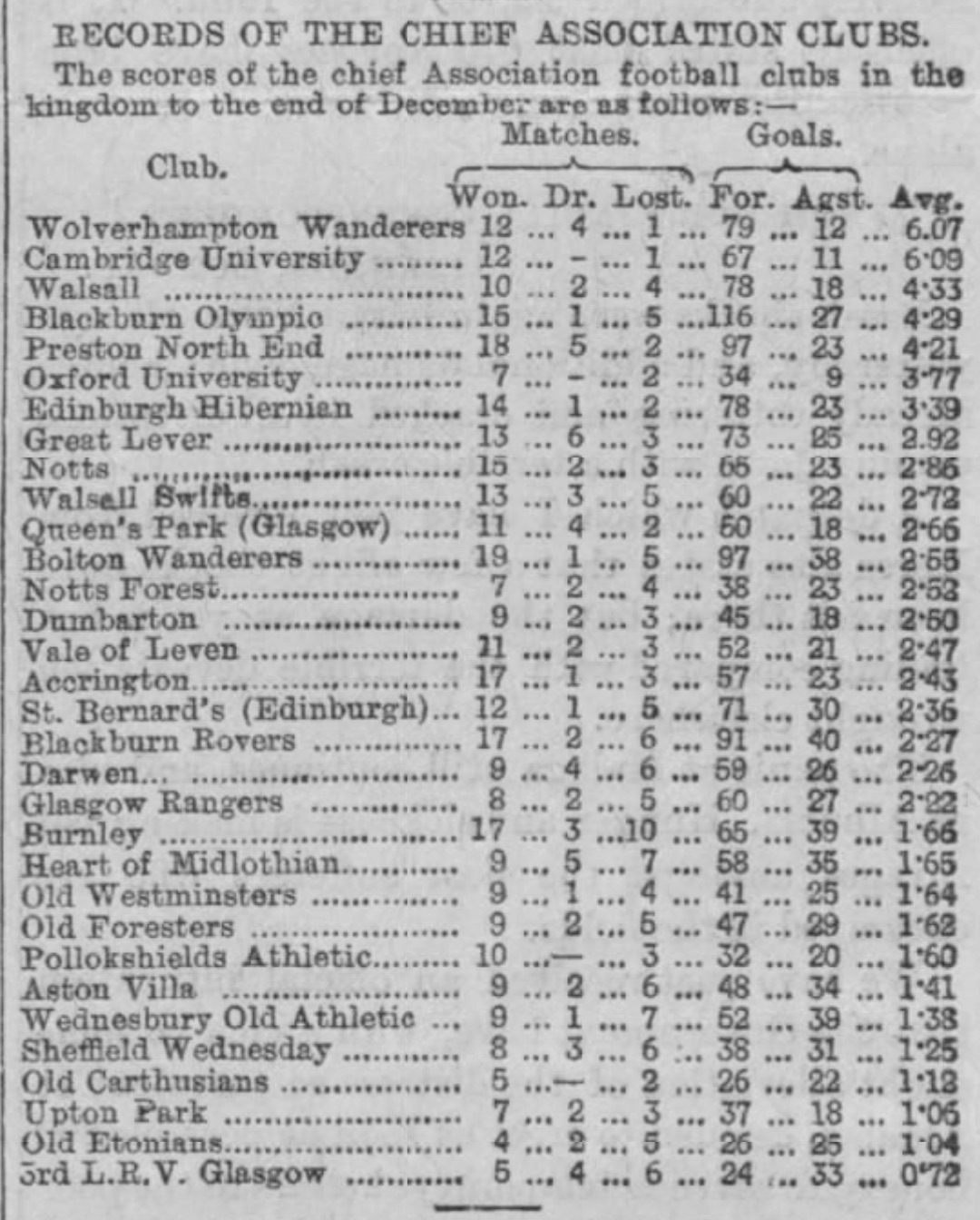
An early form of football league table, with clubs sorted by goal average. Manchester Courier, 5 January 1885

The 1884–85 English football season was Bolton Wanderers' 4th season in Football Association Cup, the top-level association football competition at the time. Wanderers originally entered the FA Cup and were drawn to play Preston Zingari. However, both clubs withdrew due to a professional argument with The Football Association.

== See also ==
- Bolton Wanderers F.C. seasons
