= Bell's Temperance F.C. =

Former association football club in Lancashire

Bell's Temperance
- Full name: Bell's Temperance Football Club
- Nicknames: Bell's, the Abstainers, the Watermen
- Founded: 1884
- Dissolved: 1895
- Ground: Bell's Temperance Field
- Chairman: E. J. Holden
- Secretary: A. Tattersall
colours

Bell's Temperance F.C. was an association football club from Accrington, Lancashire, active in the 1880s and 1890s.

== History ==
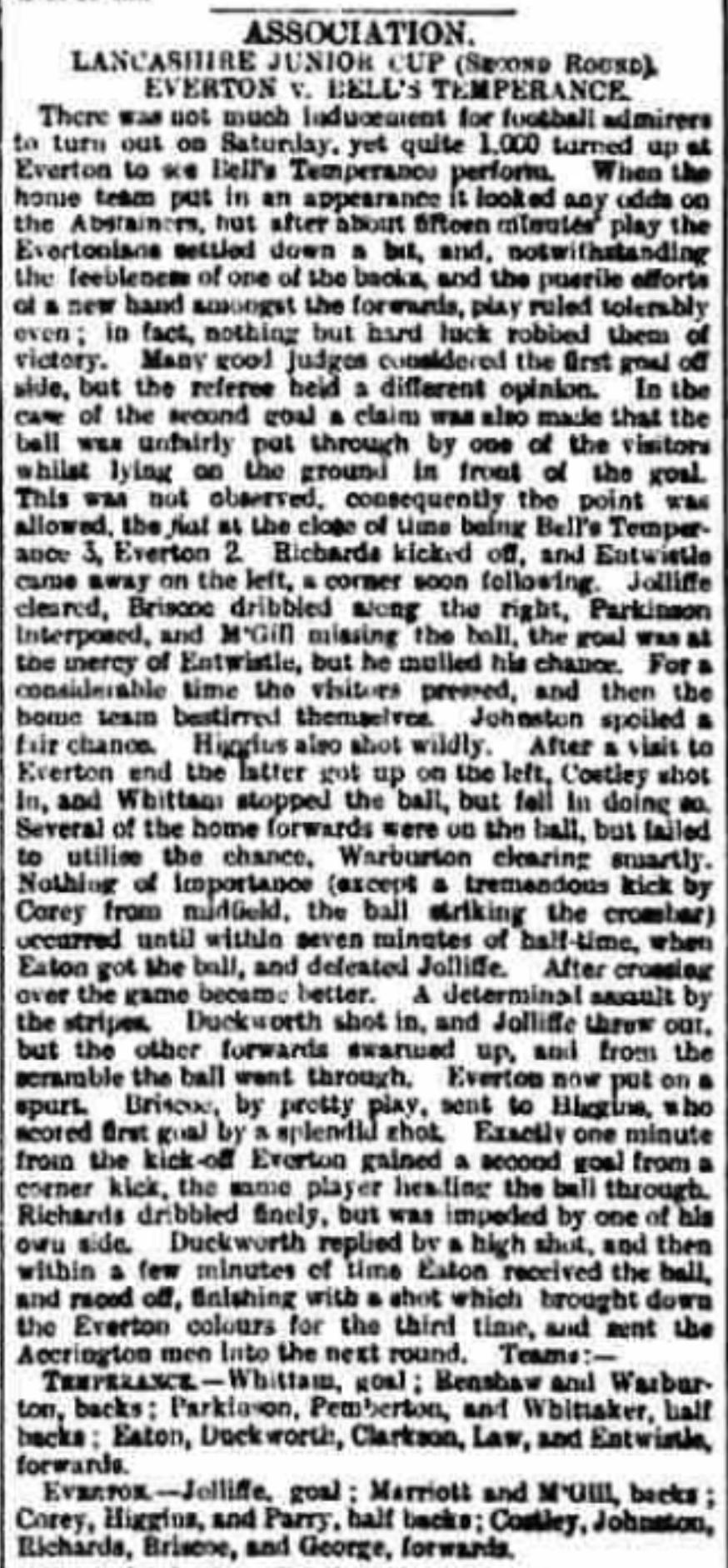
1886–87 Lancashire Junior Cup 2nd Round, Everton 2–3 Bell's Temperance, Liverpool Daily Post, 8 November 1886

The club was founded in 1884, from a working men's club in Nuttall Street named in honour of William Bell, a promoter of the Temperance Movement, and which did not serve alcohol. Its earliest recorded match was a 4–3 win over West End of Burnley in September. Bell's entered the Lancashire Senior Cup in 1884–85, losing 4–3 at Darcy Lever. The club was ambitious enough to attend the early meetings of the proposed British Football Association.

Bell's won the first Lancashire Junior Cup in 1885–86, beating Darwen Rovers 6–2 in front of 4,000 spectators at the Fleetwood Rangers ground, with goals from Holgate (2), Parkinson, Heaton, Sprone, and Entwistle - the score was 1–1 at half-time but Bell's had played into the wind in the first half. It retained the trophy in 1886–87, having originally been knocked out by Lostock Hall in a fifth replay but successfully appealing the defeat on the basis that Lostock had fielded professionals. En route to the final Bell's beat Everton 3–2 at Anfield.

It was unable to defend its Junior trophy in 1887–88 as the competition regulations forbade a two-time winner from entering, so that season it could only play in the Senior; it lost 10–1 at Bolton Wanderers in the first round. The one consolation for the club was its treasurer, Richard Watson, successfully appealed against some of the expenses Bolton Wanderers were claiming in order to reduce the gate share due to Bell's, his advocacy being so persuasive that he was invited onto the Lancashire FA committee. The club also reached the East Lancashire Charity Cup final, but lost 4–3 to Blackburn Park Road at Blackburn Rovers' Leamington ground.

In March 1889, the club proposed the foundation of a Junior football league, with clubs such as Burnley Union Star, Higher Walton, Nelson, and Blackburn Park Road as members. The competition - the North-East Lancashire League - was taken over by the Lancashire Combination in 1894–95, but this new higher standard was too much for Bell's. The club had been a mid-table outfit in the North-East Lancashire League, but it finished bottom of the 1894–95 Combination table, with only 3 wins in 24 matches - even worse for the club it had two points deducted for fielding an ineligible player, and was ordered to pay a 30s fine for not paying a season deposit; the club was so financially strapped that the money had to come from Bolton Wanderers.

Despite this poor season, the club was exempted from the Junior Cup qualifying stages in 1895–96, but the club lost 7–0 at Turton in the first round, and does not seem to have played again; it was certainly defunct by 1899.

== Colours ==
The club wore narrow blue and white striped shirts, white shorts, and blue stockings.

== Ground ==
The club played at the Bell's Temperance Football Field at Woodnook, which became Accrington Stanley's ground until 1901.

== Notable players ==
- James Hardman, who became captain of Accrington Stanley
- Harry Parkinson, half-back, who later joined Everton
- Luther Pemberton, half-back, who later joined Accrington
- Joe Clegg, centre-half, who later joined Bury

== See also ==
- Greenock Abstainers F.C., Good Templar football club in Greenock
- United Abstainers F.C., Scottish Temperance League club in Crosshill, Glasgow
