= James McConnell (footballer, fl. 1886–1890) =

English footballer

Personal information
- Place of birth: England
- Position: Goalkeeper

Senior career*
Years	Team	Apps	(Gls)
- Padiham
1886–1890	Burnley	1	(0)
- Brierfield
- * Club domestic league appearances and goals

James McConnell was an English professional footballer who played as a goalkeeper. He played for Padiham before joining Burnley in August 1886. He played first competitive match for Burnley on 23 October 1886 in the 3–3 draw away at Astley Bridge in the first round of the FA Cup. McConnell played four further FA Cup ties for Burnley, but by the time the Football League commenced in September 1888, he had been replaced by William Smith as the first-choice goalkeeper. He eventually made his league debut for the club on 11 January 1890 in the 1–3 loss to Stoke at Turf Moor. McConnell left Burnley in the summer of 1890 and subsequently signed for Brierfield.
