= William Smith (footballer, born 1865) =

English footballer

Personal information
- Full name: William Stevenson Smith
- Date of birth: 1865
- Place of birth: Haggate, England
- Position: Goalkeeper

Senior career*
Years	Team	Apps	(Gls)
1887	Haggate		
1888–1895	Burnley	7	(0)
- * Club domestic league appearances and goals

William Stevenson Smith (1865–?) was an English professional footballer who played as a goalkeeper. He played seven matches in the Football League for Burnley.

== Career ==
Born in Haggate, Lancashire, Smith played amateur local football before joining Burnley in October 1885. He was signed as an understudy to first-choice goalkeeper James McConnell, and accordingly played only a few friendly matches prior to the formation of the Football League. He made his competitive debut for Burnley in their first ever league match, the 2–5 defeat away at Preston North End on 8 September 1888. He kept his place in the side for the following two matches, but was dropped in favour of new signing Robert Kay. He never properly regained his place in the Burnley team, and had to wait until 30 November 1889 before he made another appearance. In total, Smith played seven league matches before leaving Burnley in 1895.

== 1888-1889 ==
William Smith made his League & Club debut on 8 September 1888, as a goalkeeper, at Deepdale, the home of Preston North End. The home team defeated Burnley 5–2. William Smith appeared in only three of the 22 League matches played by Burnley in season 1888–89.
