= Thomas Griffith =

Thomas, Tom or Tommy Griffith may refer to:

- Thomas Griffith (actor) (1680–1744), Irish stage actor and theatre manager
- Thomas Griffith (Australian politician) (1842–1913), member of the New South Wales Legislative Assembly
- Tommy Griffith (1889–1967), American baseball player
- Thomas B. Griffith (born 1954), American judge
- Thomas D. Griffith, American academic in taxation and tax law
- Thomas Ian Griffith (born 1962), American actor, screenwriter, producer, musician, and martial artist
- Thomas Risely Griffith (1848–?), British colonial official
- Thomas Griffith (MP) for Flint Boroughs in the 16th century

== See also ==
- Thomas Griffiths (disambiguation)
