= Harry Pringle =

English footballer

Personal information
- Full name: Henry Pringle
- Date of birth: 8 April 1900
- Place of birth: Perkinsville, County Durham, England
- Date of death: 8 January 1965 (aged 64)
- Place of death: Grantham, England
- Height: 5 ft 8 1/2 in (1.74 m)
- Position: Forward

Senior career*
Years	Team	Apps	(Gls)
–	Craghead United		
1920–1921	Arsenal	0	(0)
–	Chester-le-Street Town		
1922–1934	Lincoln City	292	(60)
1934–1940	Grantham		

Managerial career
- 1934–1937: Grantham
- * Club domestic league appearances and goals

Henry Pringle (8 April 1900 – 8 January 1965) was an English professional footballer who scored 60 goals from 292 appearances in the Football League playing as a forward for Lincoln City.

== Football career ==
Pringle was born in Perkinsville, County Durham. He began his football career with Craghead United, and was briefly on the books of Arsenal before returning to the north-east to play for Chester-le-Street Town. In 1922, Pringle joined Lincoln City. He made his debut on 26 August 1922 in a 3–1 defeat away to Halifax Town in the Football League Third Division North. Pringle finished the 1922–23 season as the club's joint leading scorer alongside Tommy Griffiths, though the pair scored only seven goals apiece. Two years later, Pringle was again Lincoln's top scorer, with 15 goals from League and FA Cup games. In all, he remained with the club for twelve seasons, becoming the first player to play in more than 300 League and FA Cup games for Lincoln City, finishing with 64 goals from 315 games, and set a club record (since broken) of 292 appearances in the Football League. He married the daughter of a director of the club.

His playing style was described as that of "an enthusiastic team man, a hard working forager and provider for others, but never a great shot. His best displays have been given on heavy grounds, as apparently he experiences some difficulty in controlling a light ball."

Pringle left Lincoln City in 1934 to become Grantham's first player-manager. As player, he scored on his debut in the Midland League, and played at least occasionally until 1940. As manager, he led the club to the First Round Proper of the 1935–36 FA Cup, and won the Lincolnshire Senior Cup in 1937 for only the second time in the club's history. However, Grantham's financial problems meant he stepped down as manager at the start of the 1937–38 season, but stayed with the club as trainer for a further 14 years. During the 1950s Pringle acted as trainer for the works team of Aveling Barford, the Grantham-based manufacturer of steamrollers.

Pringle died in Grantham in 1965 at the age of 64.
