= Football League Third Division =

Former third-tier football league division in England

- Founded: 1920; 106 years ago
- Folded: 2004; 22 years ago
- Replaced by: EFL League Two
- Country: England; Wales
- Number of clubs: 24
- Level on pyramid: 3 (1920–1992); 4 (1992–2004)
- Promotion to: Second Division
- Relegation to: Fourth Division (1958–1992); Football Conference (1992–2004)
- Domestic cup(s): FA Cup; League Cup; Football League Trophy
- Last champions: Doncaster Rovers (2003–04)
- Most championships: Plymouth Argyle (4 titles, including 2 in Third Division South)

The Football League Third Division was the third tier of the English football league system in 1920–21 and again from 1958 until 1992. When the FA Premier League was formed, the Third Division was renamed as the new Second Division, although continuing as the third tier. The previous Second Division (remaining as the second tier) was renamed as the new First Division. In 2004, following the renaming of the First Division as the Football League Championship, the division was renamed Football League One.

== Early attempts ==
Following the close of the 1910–11 season, the Football League initiated proceedings to add a new division, having received the approval of more than thirty of the forty member clubs. At least sixteen teams would have been required to apply for this to proceed. Representatives from a number of prominent non-league clubs - among them Lincoln City, recently voted out of the League - agreed to form a twenty-team Third Division. This was ultimately rejected by the Football League, who were concerned with the impact it would have on other leagues but were receptive to hearing a more detailed proposal for the following season. Seventeen clubs pledged themselves definitively to the new league: Cardiff City, Chesterfield, Crewe Alexandra, Croydon Common, Darlington, Hartlepool United, Lincoln City, Port Vale, Portsmouth, Rochdale, Rotherham Town, Southend United, South Liverpool, South Shields, Southport Central, St. Helens Town, Walsall. Six further clubs are known to have been invited to make up the numbers: Barrow, Castleford Town, Kidderminster Harriers, Shrewsbury Town, Stoke City and Worcester City In the event, following objections from the Southern League, the existing clubs rejected the scheme by 26 votes to 12 (with two abstentions) in December 1911. All but six of the rejected clubs did eventually go on to play League football.

== Founder clubs of the Third Division (1920) ==
Most of these clubs were drawn from what was then the top division of the 1919–20 Southern Football League, in an expansion of the Football League south of Birmingham. As Cardiff City was long considered a potential entrant for the Second Division due to their FA Cup exploits and good Southern League performances, they were sent directly into the Second Division and Grimsby Town, who finished in last place in the Second Division in 1919–20, were relegated.

- Brentford
- Brighton & Hove Albion
- Bristol Rovers
- Crystal Palace (inaugural champions in 1920–21)
- Exeter City
- Gillingham
- Grimsby Town
- Luton Town
- Merthyr Town
- Millwall
- Newport County
- Northampton Town
- Norwich City
- Plymouth Argyle
- Portsmouth
- Queens Park Rangers
- Reading
- Southampton
- Southend United
- Swansea Town
- Swindon Town
- Watford

== The split Third Divisions ==
This league continued in 1921–22 as Football League Third Division South whilst the Football League Third Division North was formed with the Northern clubs, the two Divisions jointly forming the third tier.

Geographical separation was abolished in 1958 with the creation of the Football League Fourth Division.

== As a single Third Division ==
The original members in 1958–59 were:

- From Third Division North: Accrington Stanley, Bradford City, Bury, Chesterfield, Halifax Town, Hull City, Mansfield Town, Rochdale, Stockport County, Tranmere Rovers, Wrexham
- From Third Division South: Bournemouth, Brentford, Colchester United, Newport County, Norwich City, Plymouth Argyle, Queens Park Rangers, Reading, Southampton, Southend United, Swindon Town
- Relegated from Second Division: Doncaster Rovers, Notts County

Of these, Bournemouth, Bradford, Brentford, Hull, Norwich, Notts, QPR, Reading, Southampton, and Swindon have made the top flight in either the First Division or the Premier League era. Stockport, Doncaster, Notts County and Rochdale were the first to be relegated into the Fourth Division the following season (1959–60), starting the bottom-four-team turnover tradition for the third tier. As with the Second Division, the champion and runner-up were automatically promoted; the third place was also promoted automatically beginning in 1974. Play-offs for the third promotion place were introduced in 1987. AFC Bournemouth, formerly Bournemouth & Boscombe Athletic, hold the record as the club to have spent most time in this division.

The Third Division of English football lasted for a total of 72 years, the first 38 years as two regionalised divisions (although just 31 seasons were played due to the advent of World War II) before a 34-year run as a national division. Plymouth Argyle were the most successful team at this level during these years, winning the national title twice, having already won the southern section twice.

In 1992, the FA Premier League started and the Football League was reduced in numbers, leading to the Third Division becoming the fourth tier. See Football League One for the subsequent third-tier history.

== Winners of the Third Division ==
See List of winners of English Football League One and predecessors for winners before 1992 and List of winners of English Football League Two and predecessors for winners afterwards.
