= Heywood F.C. (1897) =

Defunct football club from Lancashire

- Full name: Heywood Football Club
- Founded: 1897
- Dissolved: 1904
- Ground: Egerton Park
- President: Cllr R. Jackson
Home colours

Heywood F.C. was an English association football club based in Heywood, Lancashire.

== History ==
The club was formed in 1897, mainly from the recently folded Heywood Rovers setup. In October 1897 the club was admitted to the Central Lancashire League, to replace Holyroyd's of Milnrow, which had disbanded.

The club's greatest triumph was winning the Lancashire Junior Cup in 1900–01, beating Parr 2–0 in the final at Deepdale before 1,000 spectators, a week after winning the Parks cup; Heywood's superior teamwork and speed overran the heavy Parr side on a heavy pitch, with both goals being scored by centre-forward Hill, the second almost on time. It also won the Parks Challenge Cup that season, and was runner-up in the Manchester Junior Cup.

Heywood joined the Manchester League in 1901, and was invited to join the Lancashire League at the same time, but declined, owing to the strength of competition. The following season (1902–03), the club joined the Lancashire Combination, alongside rival Heywood United, and finished 12th in the division. At the end of the 1902–03 season, the club's long-standing secretary, William Greenhalgh, resigned, as he had moved to Rochdale. However, the 1903–04 season saw the club drop to near the bottom of the table, and go from making a profit to incurring losses of nearly £40, with wages rising but gates plummeting. An attempt to raise money via a prize draw was so disastrous that the losses incurred ended up causing the club to disband.

== Colours ==
The club wore white shirts and blue knickers; the blue refers to serge, readily available.

== Ground ==
The club played at Egerton Park.

== Notable players ==
- Harry Astley, who signed for Bolton Wanderers after the 1900–01 season.
