= Jonty Entwistle =

English footballer

Personal information
- Full name: Jonathan Entwistle
- Date of birth: Q3 1868
- Place of birth: Darwen, England
- Date of death: 1904
- Position: Forward

Senior career*
Years	Team	Apps	(Gls)
1884-1885	Darwen Rovers		
1885-1886	Haslingden Association		
1886–1889	Darwen		
1889–1890	Accrington	19	(9)
1890–1894	Darwen	40	(15)
1895–1896	Accrington		
1896–1897	Nelson		
1897–1898	Padiham		
Total		59	(24)
- * Club domestic league appearances and goals

Jonathan Entwistle, known as Jonty Entwhistle, (born Q3 1868 - 1904) was an English footballer who played in the Football League for Accrington and Darwen.

== Early career ==
Jonty Entwhistle in 1884 was signed as a Youth player with Darwen Rovers F.C. from his home town. In 1885 he signed for Haslingden Association and in 1886 for his first spell at Darwen aged 18. Entwhistle stayed at Darwen during the inaugural Football League season of 1888-89.

== Season 1889-90 ==
Accrington signed Entwhistle. He missed the first two weeks of the season. He made his Accrington and League debut on 21 September 1889 at Turf Moor, Burnley. Entwhistle played on the right-wing. Accrington drew the match 2-2.

Entwhistle kept his place on 28 September 1889 for the visit of Blackburn Rovers. Entwhistle scored both of Accrington's goals, including his debut goal, which earned Accrington a point.

Entwhistle only missed three League games scoring nine League goals. He played in all but one of Accrington's nine wins. Accrington finished sixth, their highest position in their short time as a League club.

Entwhistle played all three FA Cup ties scoring two in a 3-0 home First Round Replay win over West Bromwich Albion.

== Statistics ==
Club	Season	Division	League		FA Cup		Total	
Club	Season	Division	Apps	Goals	Apps	Goals	Apps	Goals
Accrington	1889–90	The Football League	19	9	3	2	22	11
Darwen	1891–92	Football League	22	7	2	0	24	7
Darwen	1892–93	Second Division	15	5	3	3	18	8
Darwen	1893–94	First Division	3	3	-	-	3	3
