= Jimmy Hutchinson =

English footballer

Personal information
- Full name: James Arthur Hutchinson
- Date of birth: 15 December 1915
- Place of birth: Sheffield, England
- Date of death: 1997 (aged 81–82)
- Position: Inside forward

Youth career
- Aqueduct

Senior career*
Years	Team	Apps	(Gls)
1937–1946	Sheffield United	0	(0)
1946–1947	Bournemouth & Boscombe Athletic	8	(3)
1947–1949	Lincoln City	85	(55)
1949–1950	Oldham Athletic	14	(3)
- Denaby United
Total		107+	(61+)
- * Club domestic league appearances and goals

James Arthur Hutchinson (28 December 1915 – 1997) was an English footballer who spent the 1940s with Sheffield United, Bournemouth & Boscombe Athletic, Lincoln City and Oldham Athletic. He was the father of Barry Hutchinson, a footballer in the 1950s and 1960s. Both father and son finished a season as Lincoln City's top-scorer.

== Career ==
Hutchinson played for Aqueduct and Sheffield United before the outbreak of World War II, in which he guested for Bradford City, the Royal Navy, Lincoln City, Hull City and Port Vale. After the war he moved on to Harry Kinghorn's Bournemouth & Boscombe Athletic, scoring three goals in eight Third Division South games in 1946–47. He left Dean Court and spent the 1947–48 season with Lincoln City, and scored 21 league goals as Bill Anderson's "Imps" won the Third Division North title by a one-point margin over Rotherham United. However, Lincoln were relegated out of the Second Division in last place in 1948–49, and Hutchinson left Sincil Bank. He spent the 1949–50 campaign with Oldham Athletic, scoring three goals in 14 Third Division North appearances for Billy Wootton's "Latics". He never found another club in the Football League after leaving Boundary Park and instead played non-League football for Denaby United.

== Career statistics ==
Appearances and goals by club, season and competition
Club	Season	League			FA Cup		Total	
Club	Season	Division	Apps	Goals	Apps	Goals	Apps	Goals
Sheffield United	1945–46		0	0	1	0	1	0
Bournemouth & Boscombe Athletic	1946–47	Third Division South	8	3	0	0	8	3
Lincoln City	1946–47	Third Division North	25	15	5	2	30	17
Lincoln City	1947–48	Third Division North	41	32	1	0	42	32
Lincoln City	1948–49	Second Division	19	8	0	0	19	8
Lincoln City	Total		85	55	6	2	91	57
Oldham Athletic	1948–49	Third Division North	7	3	0	0	7	3
Oldham Athletic	1949–50	Third Division North	7	0	0	0	7	0
Oldham Athletic	Total		14	3	0	0	14	3
Career total			107	61	7	2	114	63
