= Clitheroe F.C. (1887) =

British football club

Clitheroe
- Full name: Clitheroe Football Club
- Founded: 1879
- Dissolved: 1898
- Ground: Waterloo Playing Fields
- President: Mr W. King-Wilkinson, Middlewood Hall
- Secretary: James Wilson
Home colours

Clitheroe Football Club was an association football club from Clitheroe, Lancashire, active in the late 19th century.

== History ==
On 19 February 1887, Pendle Rangers F.C., the last remaining association club in Clitheroe, disbanded, despite having "ample funds in hand", due to "the great lack of interest shown by the members". Nevertheless, there was still a hidden demand for the association code in the town, and in September 1887 a Clitheroe selection was invited to play a friendly match at Cliftonville in the north of British Ireland.

Perhaps as a result of that, on 7 October 1887 a meeting of players took place to consider "whether a football club could not be started in the town", as a replacement of the original Clitheroe club. It was decided to form a club, again called Clitheroe Football Club, but this time as an amateur club.

=== FA Cup entries ===
The club entered the 1888–89 FA Cup qualifying rounds, beating Blackburn Park Road 3–2 at home in the first round, coming from 2–0 down after 20 minutes; the Roadsters protested on the basis that the Clitheroe pitch was 6 feet too narrow at one end and 8 inches too narrow in the middle, later amended to the pitch being four inches too short, but withdrew the protest before the second round draw. Clitheroe's second and final win came in the 1896–97 FA Cup qualifying rounds, Rossendale being the victim. (Clitheroe's defeat in the next round at Chorley, having sold home advantage, was not mourned - the third qualifying round date coincided with a League match, and Clitheroe could not afford the expense of postponing it; indeed it was only the £12 Chorley agreed to pay for switching the venue which persuaded Clitheroe not to scratch.)

=== Lancashire Junior Cup ===
As an amateur club, Clitheroe entered the Lancashire Junior Cup in 1888–89, although it came within a whisker of quitting the competition after thrice being told to re-play a tie with Brierfield. The first time, a Clitheroe win was annulled on the basis that the goals were found to be half an inch too small, the second time after Brierfield won in front of a Clitheroe crowd "in a positively insane state of mind" but fielded an ineligible player, and the third time (at neutral ground in Darwen) ended goalless, but Brierfield refused to play extra-time, so, at the referee's instruction, Clitheroe ran the ball into goal unopposed and claimed a 1–0 win. Clitheroe finally and definitively won 3–0 at the fourth time of asking, played at Witton, in front of 3,000 spectators; a further 750 were left behind at Clitheroe, unable to board the train. The sides buried the hatchet in a spirited and comic "wake" at Codger's Bull and Bush Hotel. The effort however evidently took too much out of the side, as it lost at Blackpool in the next round.

=== North-east Lancashire League ===
The club was one of the founder members of the North-east Lancashire League for the 1889–90 season, but the club withdrew before the season started, amidst rancour between the club members. In September 1889, club secretary and treasurer John Hargreaves resigned, having been accused of dishonesty by some of the new, "enterprising", committee members, who had come on board to replace "the old and somewhat inactive" members; just two months earlier, the club had presented Hargreaves with a marble clock in gratitude for his services. Following a "most animated" meeting, three committee members resigned, and Hargreaves was re-appointed as secretary.

=== Turning professional and the split with Central ===
The club turned professional for the 1890–91 season and re-started in the North-east Lancs League, but the simmering tensions split the club asunder at the start of 1891, with the amateur player-members joining the newly-formed Clitheroe Central, leaving behind professionals chiefly from Preston and Darwen. In order to prevent the new club gaining traction, Clitheroe reported Central to the Lancashire Football Association for poaching players before Central had even played a match, with the result that a number of players sat out a short suspension. A reserve Clitheroe XI hammered Central 6–1 in March 1891, which basically ended that incarnation of Central, although the name was revived a decade later.

=== Cup triumph and Lancashire Combination ===
The club's finest triumph was winning the Lancashire Junior Cup in 1892–93, beating Kearsley 4–0 in the final at Ewood Park; this was despite having to play most of the match with 10 men, after the injured Radcliffe summoned up enough strength to score the second goal with a "clinking" shot before limping off. The team was welcomed from Whalley Station by five waggonettes and serenaded by the Borough Prize Band with the songs "See The Conquering Hero Comes" and "The Man Who Broke The Bank At Monte Carlo".

The North-east League was merged into the Lancashire Combination at the end of the 1893–94 season, but Clitheroe joined the Lancashire League for 1894–95 instead. The club failed to gain re-election in 1895–96, having finished bottom of the table (and having been one off the bottom the previous season), but was brought back in after Blackpool left to join the Football League.

=== End of the club ===
At the end of the 1896–97 season, the club rose to 6th in the League, but the effort left the club £118 in debt, having lost £60 over the year, but, despite the club resolving to quit the Lancashire League, a "unanimous and enthusiastic" committee - given a week's grace to decide - had second thoughts, and resolved to give it another try. However, this merely delayed the inevitable; in April 1898 the club's finances collapsed entirely, and it was forced to disband, although the Lancashire League guaranteed the club's expenses for its final fixtures, so that its results would not have to be expunged - three clubs (Oldham County, Bacup, and Fairfield) had already quit the competition mid-season. Clitheroe bowed out with a 4–0 defeat at Ashton North End, its match at champion New Brighton Tower being unnecessary.

== Colours ==
The club's original outfit was of chocolate jerseys with yellow collars. After one season, the club changed to white shirts with blue collar and "wristbands"; in 1890 the club described its colours as "blue and white", which may have been the same design.

== Ground ==
The club originally played at Shaw Bridge, using the White Lion hotel for facilities. At the end of the 1888–89 season, the ground was taken for building, so the club moved to the Waterloo playing fields, using the Dog & Partridge for club facilities.
