= Johnny Campbell (footballer, born 1910) =

Scottish footballer

Personal information
- Date of birth: 7 March 1910
- Place of birth: Stevenston, Scotland
- Date of death: 6 July 1999 (aged 89)
- Height: 5 ft 10 1/2 in (1.79 m)
- Position: Forward

Senior career*
Years	Team	Apps	(Gls)
- Dalry Thistle
1931–1933	Leicester City	21	(12)
1933–1939	Lincoln City	184	(104)
1939–194?	Scunthorpe & Lindsey United		
194?–19??	Lincoln Co-op		
- * Club domestic league appearances and goals

John Campbell (7 March 1910 – 6 July 1999) was a Scottish professional footballer who scored 116 goals from 205 games in the Football League playing as a forward for Leicester City and Lincoln City.

== Career ==
Campbell was born in Stevenston, Ayrshire. He gave up his chemistry studies to join English First Division club Leicester City, together with John Calder, his teammate at junior club Dalry Thistle, in July 1931. He scored on his debut for the club, against Birmingham in December 1932, but despite a respectable goal return – 14 goals from 22 games – he failed to establish himself in the first team. A year later he signed for Lincoln City for a fee of £1,250, then a club record, but was unable to help the club avoid relegation to the Third Division North at the end of the 1933–34 Football League season.

Once moved to play at centre forward rather than at outside right, Campbell began to score freely, and was Lincoln's top scorer for four consecutive seasons, from 1934–35 to 1937–38. By the time he retired from League football due to injury in the summer of 1939, Campbell had produced 108 goals from only 193 first-team games. He then joined Midland League club Scunthorpe & Lindsey United, returning to Lincoln to play in the wartime competitions.

Campbell went on to complete his studies, earning a degree in chemistry and ophthalmics, and became superintendent chemist/optician for the Lincoln Co-operative Society. He retired in 1975, and died in July 1999 at the age of 89.
