= Hugh Robertson (1890s footballer) =

Scottish footballer

Personal information
- Full name: Hugh Robertson
- Place of birth: Newmains, Scotland
- Date of death: Not known
- Position: Centre forward

Senior career*
Years	Team	Apps	(Gls)
–	Millwall Athletic		
1895–1897	Burnley	40	(15)
1897–1899	Lincoln City	64	(34)
–	Millwall Athletic		
1900	Woolwich Arsenal	0	(0)
–	Dundee		
1901	Leicester Fosse	5	(1)
- * Club domestic league appearances and goals

Hugh Robertson was a Scottish professional footballer who scored 50 goals from 260 appearances in the English Football League playing as a centre forward for Burnley, Lincoln City and Leicester Fosse.

Robertson was born in Newmains, North Lanarkshire. He played for Southern League club Millwall Athletic before joining Burnley of the Football League First Division. After two seasons, Burnley were relegated and Robertson left for Second Division club Lincoln City. He was ever-present for the next two seasons, and returns of 17 and 22 goals made him the club's leading scorer in each. After leaving Lincoln at the end of the 1898–99 season, he rejoined Millwall Athletic, spent time on the books of Woolwich Arsenal without appearing in the Football League, and returned to Scotland with Dundee, before playing a few games on a trial basis for Leicester Fosse.
