= Billy Egerton =

English footballer

Personal information
- Date of birth: 1891
- Place of birth: Bollington, England
- Date of death: 1934 (aged 42–43)
- Position: Centre forward

Senior career*
Years	Team	Apps	(Gls)
- Bollington
1911	Bolton Wanderers	2	(0)
- Chesterfield Town
1913–1919	Lincoln City	67	(24)
–	Mid Rhondda		
- * Club domestic league appearances and goals

William N. Egerton (1891–1934) was an English footballer who played in the Football League for Bolton Wanderers and Lincoln City.
