= Walter Ponting =

English footballer (1913–1960)

Personal information
- Full name: Walter Thomas Ponting
- Date of birth: 13 April 1913
- Place of birth: Grimsby, England
- Date of death: 17 August 1960 (aged 47)
- Place of death: Grimsby, England
- Height: 5 ft 11 in (1.80 m)
- Position: Centre forward

Senior career*
| Years | Team | Apps | (Gls) |
- Humber United
| 1930–1936 | Grimsby Town | 12 | (3) |
| 1936–1938 | Chesterfield | 81 | (35) |
| 1938–1939 | Lincoln City | 23 | (15) |
- * Club domestic league appearances and goals

Walter Thomas Ponting (13 April 1913 – 17 August 1960), also known as Wally Ponting, was a professional footballer who scored 53 goals from 116 appearances in the Football League playing as a centre forward for Grimsby Town, Chesterfield and Lincoln City.

== Football career ==
Ponting was born in Grimsby, Lincolnshire, and made his debut for home-town club Grimsby Town, then playing in the Football League First Division, in the 1930–31 season while still a teenager. He remained with Grimsby for another five seasons, but appeared only rarely for the first team. Ponting joined Second Division club Chesterfield in the 1936 close season for a transfer fee of £1,015, plus an additional £200 payable if Chesterfield reached the Fourth Round of the 1936–37 FA Cup. They were drawn against Arsenal in the Third Round, and failed to progress further.

He went straight into the starting eleven, and finished the season as the club's leading scorer with 26 goals, all scored in League games. But for an unfortunate occurrence, he might well have had a 27th. The Times reported "a curious incident in the match between Chesterfield and Burnley, which Chesterfield won 4–1. Soon after the start Ponting, the home centre-forward, shot hard for goal and appeared to be a certain scorer when the ball became deflated and failed to reach the goal."

In 1937–38, Ponting's goals helped Chesterfield to reach the Fifth Round of the FA Cup, in which they lost to Tottenham Hotspur only after a replay. His contribution in the League was disappointingly low, and after scoring only once from nine first-team games at the start of the next season, he moved on. Though his final appearance for the club, on 5 November 1938, did produce a goal, in a 1–1 draw with Sheffield United's reserve team that ensured Chesterfield's reserves stayed top of the Central League.

Ponting then signed for Lincoln City of the Third Division North, and made his debut on the following Saturday. In his only season with the club before the outbreak of the Second World War put a stop to League football, Ponting was their leading scorer, with 19 goals from just 26 League and FA Cup games, despite not having played his first game for Lincoln until mid-November, some 2 1/2 months after the start of the season. During the 1939–40 season, he played both for Lincoln and as a guest for former club Grimsby Town in the wartime competitions.

Ponting died in his native Grimsby in 1960 at the age of 47.
