= Tom Griffiths (footballer, born 1888) =

English footballer

Personal information
- Full name: Thomas Griffiths
- Date of birth: 27 October 1888
- Place of birth: Liverpool, England
- Height: 5 ft 10 in (1.78 m)
- Position: Left half

Senior career*
| Years | Team | Apps | (Gls) |
- Liverpool Telegraph Messengers
- Clitheroe Central
| –1910 | Blackburn Rovers | 0 | (0) |
| 1910–1912 | Exeter City | 22 | (2) |
| 1912–1914 | Clapton Orient | 12 | (0) |
| 1914 | Llanelly | | |
| –1918 | Clapton Orient | | |
- * Club domestic league appearances and goals

Thomas Griffiths was an English professional footballer who played in the Southern League for Exeter City as a left half. He also played in the Football League for Clapton Orient.

== Personal life ==
Griffiths served as a gunner in the Royal Garrison Artillery during the First World War.

== Honours ==
Blackburn Rovers Reserves

- Lancashire Combination Second Division: 1907–08
