= Fleetwood F.C. (1899) =

Football club in Fleetwood, England

- Full name: Fleetwood Football Club
- Nicknames: the Wyresiders, Wyreporters
- Founded: 1899
- Dissolved: 1928
- Ground: Queen's Ground
- Capacity: 3,500
- Chairman: Cllr. John Henry Collins
pre-World War 1 colours	post-World War 1 colours

Fleetwood F.C. was an association football club from Fleetwood, Lancashire, active in the early part of the 20th century.

== History ==
=== Amateur days ===
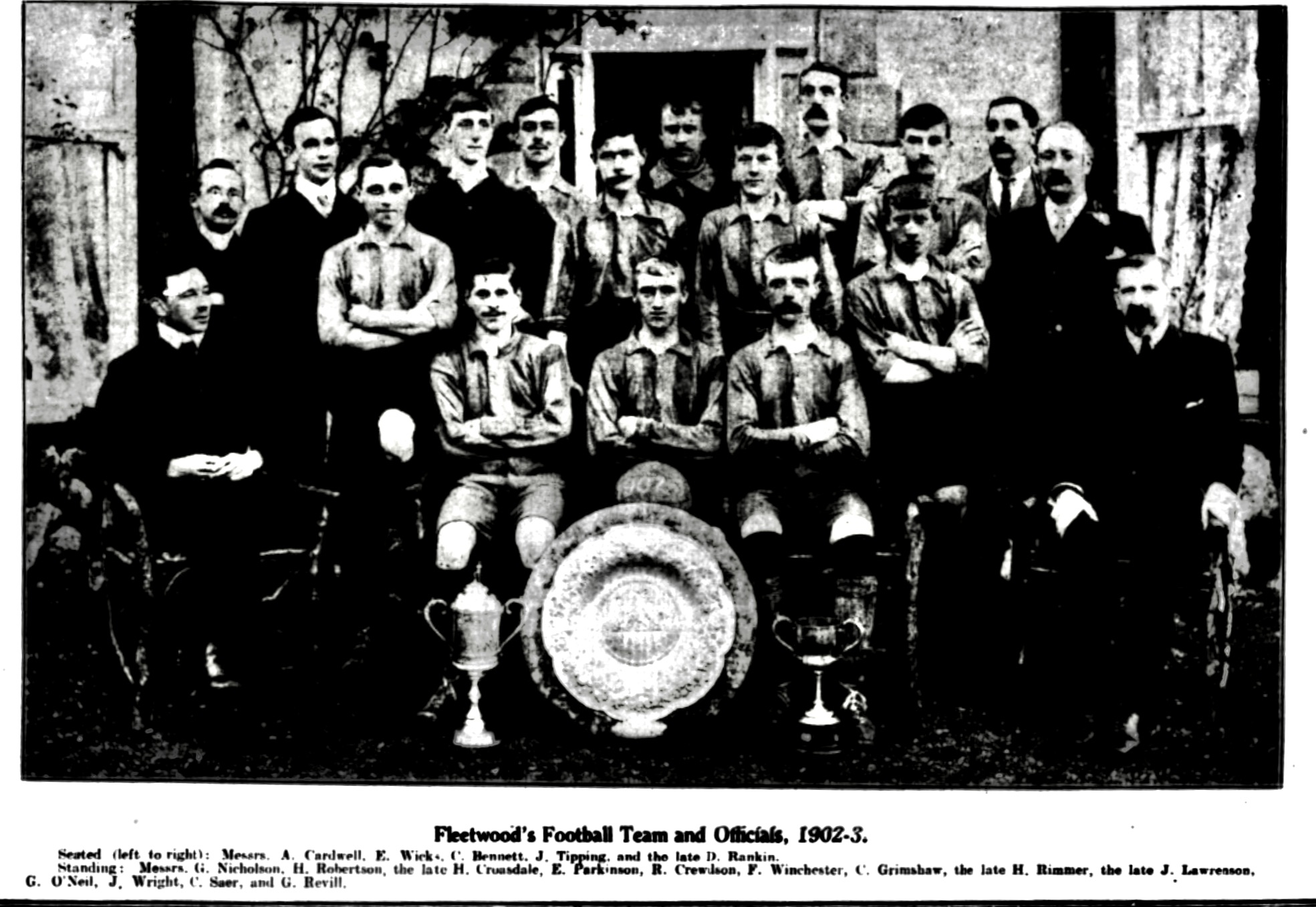
Fleetwood Amateur F.C. from 1902-03, with the Preston & District League shield, the Fylde League trophy, and the Blackpool tournament trophy; Fleetwood Chronicle, 9 November 1928

The club was founded in 1899 as Fleetwood Amateur F.C. (usually reported as Fleetwood Amateurs) to bring the association game back to the town after the dissolution of the professional club Fleetwood Rangers, and with the specific aim of remaining amateur, to the extent that the club resolved initially not to allow any of the Rangers' committee members to become involved, save for club president G. M. Humphreys, the prime force behind the new club.

The club's initial ambitions were modest, playing in the Fylde Amateur League (alongside Blackpool F.C. reserves), but the club's first season was almost its last - despite finishing runner-up to Lytham Institute, the club somehow overlooked arranging league fixtures for the following season, and only after an emergency meeting in October 1900 did the club committee agree to continue.

The club gained its first successes by winning both the Preston & District League and Fylde League in 1902–03, and in 1903–04 the club retained both titles. In 1904–05, it claimed a hat-trick of Fylde League titles, and was runner-up in the Lancashire Junior Cup, losing 1–0 to Turton to a goal in the last five minutes of the game. The following season it won the Lancashire Amateur Cup, coming from behind to beat Heaton Moor 2–1 in the final at Bloomfield Road. The congratulatory telegrams included one from the beaten side, "pleased to be beaten by such honourable opponents".

In 1906–07, the Wyreporters entered the FA Amateur Cup for the only time, and were unlucky to lose 2–1 at New Brighton Amateurs, the winner coming in the last five minutes after a mix-up between goalkeeper Frank Porter and left-back Anderton. It played in the Lancashire Alliance in the 1907–08 season, finishing 4th out of 15.

=== Semi-professionalism ===
In 1908, the club gave up on amateurism, changing its name to Fleetwood Football Club, and joined the West Lancashire League in time for the 1908–09 season; after a fourth-place finish in its first season, the club was ambitious enough to apply to join the second division of the Lancashire Combination in 1909, although the application was unsuccessful, as all clubs seeking re-election were re-elected. In 1909–10 the club was runner-up in the West Lancashire, and renewed its application to join the Combination, this time successfully; the reserve Fleetwood side remained in the West Lancashire.

The club was promoted to the Combination's top flight in 1911–12, pipping South Liverpool on goal average to the third and final promotion spot, and in 1912–13 won the Lancashire Junior Cup for the only time, beating Haslingden 2–1 at Chorley, with three further goals being disallowed; the Haslingden goal came as the final whistle blew. A Haslingden protest about the eligibility of Frank Saul, who scored the first goal, was withdrawn when Haslingden recognized that it had thought he was a different Saul.

This enabled the club to enter the Lancashire Senior Cup for the first time, but in both of its entries (in 1913–14 and 1914–15), it lost in the first round, 2–1 at home to South Liverpool and 3–2 at home to Rochdale respectively. The club's moneymaking schemes included changing colours in 1918 following sponsorship from a trawler company, in 1921, six directors were prosecuted for running an illegal lottery, selling 100,000 shilling tickets for a prize draw, in which the first prize was a house worth £2,000.

=== Post-war ===
The club entered the FA Cup for the first time in 1919–20, losing in the first preliminary round to Hamilton Central of Chorley, having to forfeit home advantage due to the new ground not being ready. It entered the competition until 1927–28, but never reached the first round proper, losing in the fourth qualifying round in 1920–21, 1922–23, and 1923–24, drawn away every time. The closest it came to progressing to the fifth was in going down 1–0 at Rochdale in 1920, after dominating the play and being denied a stonewall penalty; the victors reached the third round proper.

The club adopted limited liability in 1920 and approached the Football League with a view to applying for election in 1921. The club's greatest honour came in winning the Combination in 1923–24. However the cost of success was considerable; in its championship season, the club faced a summons for non-payment of rates, the chairman of the magistrates remarking that the club ought to host its own benefit match, and the overall losses for the season ran to £651 - the highest gate, for the derby with Morecambe, only being 2,000. With some player wages outstanding, the directors embarked on a scheme of selling 750 shares for £1 each by subscription of a shilling per week.

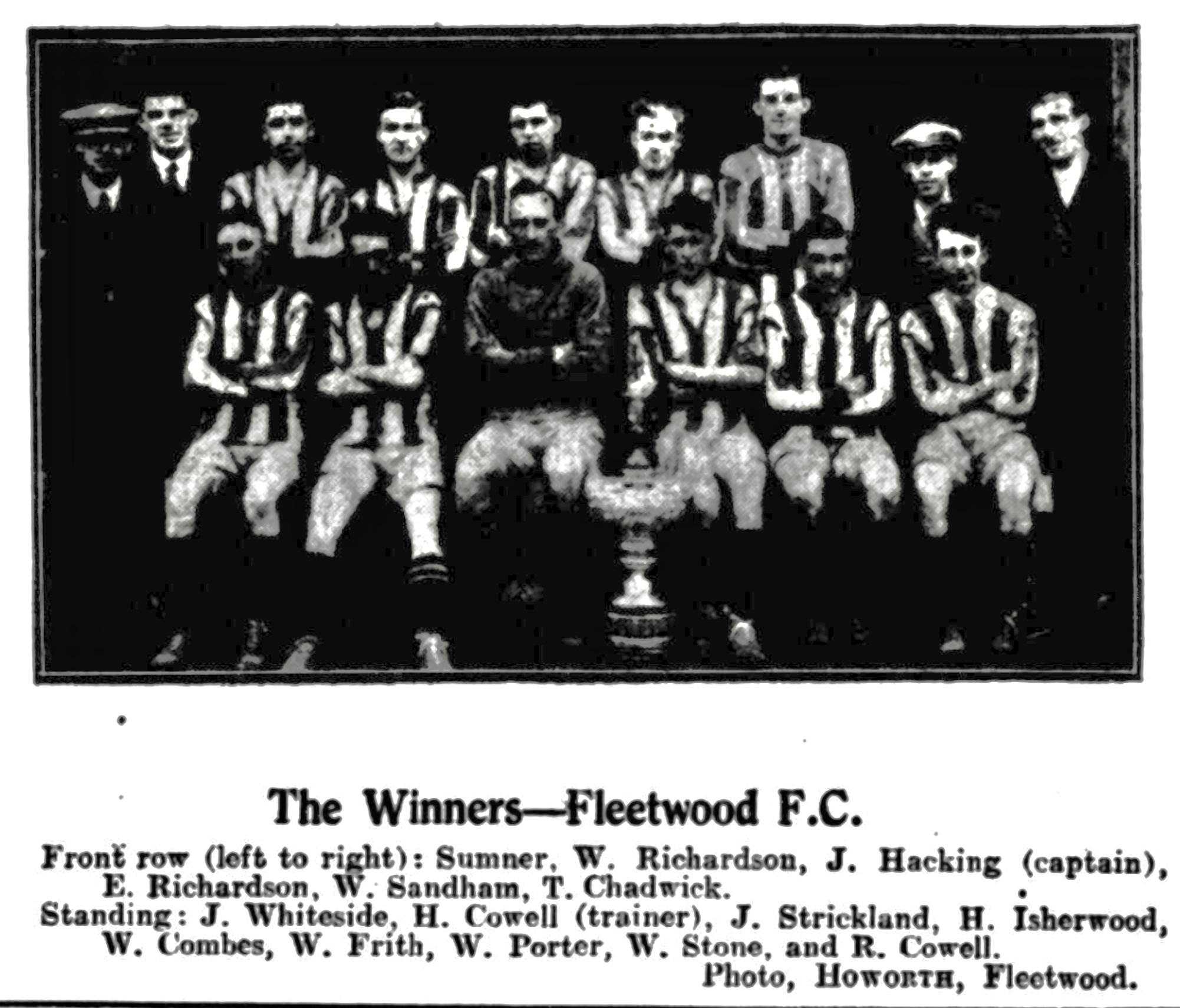
Fleetwood F.C. with the Lancashire Combination Cup, Fleetwood Chronicle, 21 May 1926

The following season, the club lost £405, with the club falling out with its own supporters' club in relation to a dispute over the signing of left-half Proctor, who originally withdrew from a deal the supporters had arranged after the directors interfered; it was in such a poor financial state that it nearly folded before the 1925–26 season. It did manage to continue, and won the Lancashire Combination Cup in 1925–26, with a surprise 2–0 win at the "strongly favoured" Nelson reserves in the final, the home side's first defeat that season, thanks to two smash and grab goals in the first half-hour, scored by Frith and Sandham from Whitesides crosses.

At the end of the 1926–27 season, the club was still losing over £200 per year, with accumulated debts of £3,900; the blame was put on disputes between the current board and the previous directors, and local fans going to Blackpool and Preston North End. The ground was duly put up for sale, stated to be "well-elevated and dry", but, on 27 and 28 October 1927, a devastating flood hit the town, flooding the ground and preventing the club from playing.

In February 1928, Fleetwood resigned from the Combination. The club's final match, at home to Accrington Stanley reserves on 4 February, was abandoned early in the second half with the visitors 4–0 up, because the Fleetwood players "were too exhausted to continue" playing into a driving rain; the gate for the match was a mere 50 and one gate of £1 6/ did not even cover the refereeing expenses. Its fixtures and record (bottom with 12 points from 22 games, including the Stanley match) were taken over by Prescot Cables. On 13 March 1928, the board resolved to wind up the club - by this time there was such apathy and resignation that only a handful of the 500 shareholders attended the crucial meeting.

== Colours ==
The club originally wore amber and black striped jerseys, as did Fleetwood Rangers, changing to red and white stripes after the First World War, leaving the old shirts to its reserve West Lancashire League side. Its change kit was plain white.

== Ground ==
The club's original ground was on Copse Road, and it moved to Warrenhurst Park in 1902. In 1909 the club opened a new ground at the North Euston Hotel, on the basis that the old ground was both distant from the town centre, and a "quagmire"; the first fixture was a friendly with Preston North End on 6 September, a crowd of 3,000 seeing the visitors win 2–1. After the First World War, the club moved to the Queen's Ground, on the junction of Poulton Road and Fleetwood Road. Once more Preston did the honours of playing in the first game, on 1 September 1920, before a crowd of 3,500; Fleetwood won 3–2 thanks to a Morris hat-trick. The cost of the ground was over £10,000, contributing to the financial issues which caused the club's demise in 1928.

== Nicknames ==
The club's nicknames of the Wyresiders or Wyreporters derived from the club's initial location at the River Wyre Port.

== Notable players ==
- Former players ( 15 )
- Centre-half George Wilson started his career with Fleetwood; he became an England international in 1921, and captained the national side seven times.
- Charlie Saer, former Leicester Fosse goalkeeper, and Harold Parker of Preston North End played for Fleetwood Amateur in its first season.
- John Arthur Scott joined the club from Blackpool in 1909, and captained the side to its Junior Cup triumph - the first success he had in after a 20-year career.
- Cecil Marsh, who joined the club in 1922 as a centre-forward, but after he mentioned that he had always wanted to play as centre-half, was moved there with such success that he was appointed as captain in 1924.
