= Billy Dinsdale =

English footballer

Personal information
- Full name: William Arthur Dinsdale
- Date of birth: 12 July 1903
- Place of birth: Darlington, England
- Date of death: 21 February 1984 (aged 80)
- Place of death: Darlington, England
- Height: 5 ft 11 in (1.80 m)
- Position: Centre forward

Senior career*
| Years | Team | Apps | (Gls) |
| – | Rise Carr | | |
| 1921–1922 | Darlington | 2 | (0) |
| – | Darlington RA | | |
| 1923 | York City (trial) | 1 | (0) |
| – | Crook Town | | |
| 1924–1926 | Aston Villa | 8 | (0) |
| 1926–1929 | Lincoln City | 92 | (69) |
| 1929–1930 | Bradford Park Avenue | 17 | (4) |
| 1930–1931 | Lincoln City | 34 | (20) |
| 1931–1932 | Darlington | 4 | (1) |
- * Club domestic league appearances and goals

William Arthur Dinsdale (12 July 1903 – 21 February 1984) was a professional footballer who scored 94 goals in 157 Football League appearances playing as a centre forward for Darlington, Aston Villa, Lincoln City and Bradford Park Avenue. He was Lincoln City's leading scorer for each of the four seasons he spent with the club.

== Football career ==
Dinsdale was born in Darlington, County Durham, and played local football before joining his home-town club, Darlington F.C., for whom he played twice in their first season in the newly formed Football League Third Division North. He then played for Darlington Railway Athletic and had a trial with York City, for whom he played one Midland League game in February 1923, before a return of 42 goals from 35 games for Northern League club Crook Town in the 1924–25 season earned him a transfer to First Division club Aston Villa. He played five games for Villa in what remained of that season, but the following year appeared only rarely for the first team, as cover for injuries or international absences, despite a good scoring record in the reserves.

He moved on to Lincoln City of the Third Division North. Although he scored in his first game for the club, against Southport on the opening day of the 1926–27 season, he was relegated to the reserves. His regular scoring earned him a first-team place a few months later, whereupon he scored 25 goals in just 27 League and FA Cup games to become the club's leading scorer for the season. He top-scored again the following season, and was described on a 1928 cigarette card as having "established himself as one of the most dangerous marksmen" in the division. After his third consecutive season as Lincoln's leading scorer, a bid of £1,500 came in from Second Division club Bradford Park Avenue which Lincoln's directors accepted.

Dinsdale scored only four goals over the 1929–30 season for Bradford, and returned to Lincoln for a £250 fee. For the fourth time in the four seasons he spent with the club, he top-scored with more than 20 goals. Described in his club profile as a "big bustling centre forward who relied on his strength and enthusiasm rather than his football skills" who was popular with the supporters, Dinsdale scored 103 goals from only 136 appearances in all competitions for Lincoln City. He left the club to return to Darlington, where he played four more games before retiring from football.

Dinsdale worked as a fitter for locomotive manufacturer Stephenson's in his native Darlington. In later life he was severely affected by arthritis. Dinsdale died in Darlington in 1984 at the age of 80.
