= Perkinsville, County Durham =

Village in County Durham, England

Coordinates: 54.877°N 1.608°W

Perkinsville
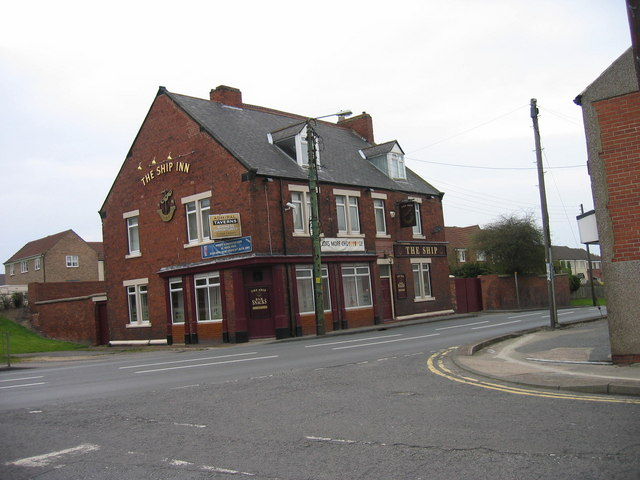
- The Ship Inn, Perkinsville

- Location within County Durham
- OS grid reference: NZ252536
- Civil parish: Pelton
- Unitary authority: County Durham
- Ceremonial county: County Durham
- Region: North East
- Country: England
- Sovereign state: United Kingdom
- Post town: Durham
- Postcode district: DH2
- Police: Durham
- Fire: County Durham and Darlington
- Ambulance: North East

Perkinsville is a village in County Durham, in England. It is situated immediately to the north of Pelton and north-west of Chester-le-Street.

There are a few shops including a convenience store, a fish and chip shop and a Beauty Salon. There is also a working men's club. A pub ('The Ship') was located in the village but has been demolished with new housing being built in its place.

Perkinsville was constructed between 1858 & 1871 by Edward Moseley Perkins, who ran Birtley Iron Works & 2 local coal mines. He was succeeded by his son Charles who expanded the business but was unfortunately killed in a car crash in 1905. Perkinsville was originally laid out in a simple colliery housing style with streets named "A street" through "E Street" and a North Street, but in the 20th century there was considerable redevelopment of the village.

The village is part of the Pelton ward of Pelton Parish Council and is part of the Pelton division of Durham County Council.
