= Brian Punter =

English footballer (born 1935)

Personal information
- Date of birth: 16 August 1935 (age 91)
- Place of birth: Wolverhampton, England
- Position: Forward

Youth career
- Wolverhampton Wanderers

Senior career*
Years	Team	Apps	(Gls)
1953–1954	Leicester City	0	(0)
1959–1964	Lincoln City	75	(21)
1964–1968	Hereford United		
- * Club domestic league appearances and goals

Brian Punter (born 16 August 1935) is an English former footballer who scored 21 goals from 75 appearances in the Football League playing as a centre forward for Lincoln City.

== Career ==
Punter was born in Waterloo Road, in Wolverhampton, Staffordshire. As a youngster he joined his local club, Wolverhampton Wanderers, for whom he played in the first leg of the FA Youth Cup Final in 1953, which Wolves lost 7–1 to a Manchester United team containing many of the "Busby Babes". An ankle injury sustained early on in that game prevented Punter taking part in the second leg, so he was not presented with his runners-up medal at the time. Feeling that "it would be nice to have one to show to our grandchildren", he eventually applied to the Football Association, and received his medal some 56 years after the event. Punter was selected for the England youth team to play against their Scottish counterparts in February 1953, one of his three international appearances made in the 1952–53 season.

Wolverhampton Wanderers were pioneers of floodlit football in the 1950s, playing friendly matches against top sides from Continental Europe. In the hope of offering better visibility under lights than their traditional old gold kit, they developed a fluorescent shirt, which was tried out in a youth team game. Only a single prototype shirt was initially produced, and Punter, who as a winger would be expected to play near the edge of the pitch and thus be noticeable, was chosen to wear it for the trial.

After leaving Wolves, Punter was on the books of Leicester City, but he moved on to Lincoln City without appearing for Leicester's first team. He made his debut on 12 December 1959 in a 1–0 home defeat to Rotherham United in the Football League Second Division. In the 1960–61 season, Lincoln finished bottom of their division. The following season, Punter, now playing as a centre forward, was the club's leading scorer, though with only eight goals as they suffered a second consecutive relegation. He repeated the achievement the next season in the Fourth Division, this time with 17 goals in all competitions as Lincoln narrowly avoided having to apply for re-election. Punter played his last game for the club in April 1964. He had remained a semi-professional player for the whole of his five years with Lincoln, while continuing his main career as a design draughtsman.

He returned to the Midlands to play for Hereford United of the Southern League, where he remained until at least the 1968–69 season. He also played for several other Midlands sides, including Kidderminster Harriers, Bromsgrove Rovers, Nuneaton Borough, Stourbridge and Darlaston.

In later life, Punter scouted for Wolverhampton Wanderers' Academy.
