= Darwen Rovers F.C. =

Former association football club in England

- Full name: Darwen Rovers Football Club
- Nickname: the Rovers
- Founded: 1877
- Dissolved: 1892
- Ground: Knowl Meadow
- Secretary: H. M. Briggs
Home colours

Darwen Rovers F.C. was an association football club from Darwen, Lancashire, active in the late 19th century.

== History ==
The earliest reference to the club is from the 1877–78 season, a win over Lytham being noted in December 1877. Its first notable achievement came in the 1884–85 Lancashire Senior Cup, with an unexpected 4–2 win at Eagley - a regular FA Cup entrant - in the first round, put down to "mutiny being rife in [the Eagley] camp". Rossendale scratched to the Rovers in the second round, and in the third the Rovers of Darwen were not disgraced with a 4–1 defeat at the Rovers of Blackburn, albeit the hosts fielding a reserve side.

However, as an amateur side, the Rovers eschewed the senior competition henceforth, and played in the first Lancashire Junior Cup competition the next season. The club in fact made it all the way to the final, but lost 6–2 against Bell's Temperance of Accrington, the match played at Fleetwood Rangers. The club reached another final in 1888–89, this time the East Lancashire Charity Shield, against Oswaldtwistle Rovers, and again lost 6–2, the Darwen side complaining about rough play.

Having made a small profit in 1888–89 (£5 5/ on an income of just under £63), the club was a founder member of the North-east Lancashire League in 1889–90, and finished 4th of the 11 clubs in the initial season, with 11 wins, 1 draw, and 8 defeats in its 20 matches. It also gained a revenge against Oswaldtwistle Rovers in the semi-final of the Charity Shield, beating them 3–1 at the Pothouse, with Singleton and Smith, plus an own goal by goalkeeper Duckett, giving Rovers a three goal half-time lead. Darwen's defeat in the final to Witton was overturned after a successful protest that the winner came after time had expired, but Witton nevertheless won at the second time of asking, 3–1, at Blackburn Rovers' Leamington Road ground.

However, it suffered a humiliating 10–2 defeat at Blackpool in the first round of the Junior Cup, having sold home advantage, and the 1891–92 season was a disaster. The club finished bottom of the North-east Lancashire League (which was now allowing reserve sides from Football League clubs), recording 11 points from 18 games, was not re-elected to the competition, and wound up as a consequence.

== Colours ==
The club wore blue and white.

== Ground ==
The club played at the Knowl Meadow, the former ground of Lower Darwen.

== Notable players ==
- Jonty Entwistle, forward, who played for the club in 1884–85.
