= Barry Hutchinson =

English footballer (1936-2005)

Personal information
- Full name: James Barry Hutchinson
- Date of birth: 27 January 1936
- Place of birth: Sheffield, England
- Date of death: 12 June 2005 (aged 69)
- Place of death: Rotherham, England
- Positions: Wing half; forward

Youth career
- Bolton Wanderers

Senior career*
Years	Team	Apps	(Gls)
1953–1960	Chesterfield	154	(16)
1960–1964	Derby County	107	(51)
1964–1965	Weymouth		
1965–1966	Lincoln City	24	(18)
1966	Darlington	30	(14)
1966–1967	Halifax Town	25	(14)
1967–1968	Rochdale	27	(3)
–	Bangor City		
- * Club domestic league appearances and goals

James Barry Hutchinson (27 January 1936 – 12 June 2005), known as Barry Hutchinson, was an English professional footballer who scored 116 goals from 367 appearances in the Football League playing for Chesterfield, Derby County, Lincoln City, Darlington, Halifax Town and Rochdale. He was a member of Frank O'Farrell's Weymouth team that won the Southern League title in 1964–65 and of the Darlington team promoted from the Fourth Division the following season. He played as a wing half in the early part of his career, later as a forward.

== Football career ==
Hutchinson was born in Sheffield, the son of former Bournemouth, Lincoln City and Oldham Athletic footballer Jimmy Hutchinson. He began his football career as an amateur with Bolton Wanderers, but never appeared for the first team, and moved on to Chesterfield in 1953. He made his debut on 19 March 1955 in a 2–1 home win against Halifax Town in the Football League Third Division North. He spent seven years with Chesterfield, mainly playing as a wing half, before moving on to Derby County of the Second Division for a fee of £2,000 plus two players.

Derby used Hutchinson as an inside left. After his second appearance for the first team produced his first goal, the Derby Evening Telegraph's reporter felt he "merit[ed] further opportunities". He scored again in the next game, and in the next, despite his inexperience in the position, he was described as "nearly always seem[ing] to have space in which to receive the ball; many of his precise passes set up movements which betrayed the Colliers' defenders into a series of thoughtless clearances, and he was a constant menace near goal". He went on to score 51 goals from 107 League games in four seasons with Derby. Transfer-listed early on in the 1963–64 season, once returned to the first team his performances as both creator and scorer of goals helped Derby avoid relegation.

Hutchinson signed for Southern League club Weymouth, then managed by Frank O'Farrell, in July 1964 for a £6,000 fee. Hutchinson's goalscoring was prolific. From 56 matches in the 1964–65 season he produced 46 goals, eleven of which came in January 1965, when he scored in each of the seven games Weymouth played that month. His 36 goals in League competition contributed not only to a Southern League winners' medal, but also a £2,000 move back into the Football League. Six months with Lincoln City in the Fourth Division was enough to make him their leading scorer for the 1965–66 season, with 20 goals from 27 games in all competitions (18 from 24 in the League). A move to Fourth Division rivals Darlington followed, "signed in February 1966 to add goals to the promotion push". The transfer fee of £5,000 was high by Fourth Division standards of the time, but the push for promotion – the club's first in more than 40 years – was successful and earned manager Lol Morgan and his team legendary status among Darlington supporters.

Hutchinson played only 30 League games for Darlington, which produced 14 goals, before moving on in November 1966 to yet another Fourth Division club, Halifax Town, for a £2,000 fee. At the end of that season he continued his tour of the Fourth Division, joining Rochdale for a fee of £2,500. A year later he dropped into non-League football with Bangor City, founder members of the Northern Premier League.

Hutchinson died in Rotherham in 2005 at the age of 69.

== Honours ==
Weymouth

- Southern League winners: 1964–65

Darlington

- Football League Fourth Division runners-up: 1965–66
