= Tommy Griffiths (footballer, born 1901) =

English footballer (1901–1950)

Personal information
- Full name: Thomas Griffiths
- Date of birth: 27 May 1901
- Place of birth: Willington Quay, England
- Date of death: 1950 (aged 48–49)
- Height: 5 ft 9 1/2 in (1.77 m)
- Position: Centre forward

Senior career*
Years	Team	Apps	(Gls)
- Willington St Aidan's
1922–1923	Lincoln City	22	(7)
1923	Jarrow		
1923–1924	Ashington	1	(0)
1924–19??	Jarrow		
- * Club domestic league appearances and goals

Thomas Griffiths (27 May 1901 – 1950) was an English professional footballer who made 28 appearances in the Football League playing as a centre forward for Lincoln City and Ashington.

== Life and career ==
Thomas Griffiths was born on 27 May 1901 in Willington Quay, Northumberland. The 1911 Census records him living in St Mary's Terrace, Willington Quay, the youngest of four surviving children of Thomas William Griffiths, a labourer in a metal foundry, and his wife, Jane.

Griffiths played local football for Willington St Aidan's, initially at full back before being switched to centre forward, from which position he scored 11 goals in the last five matches of the 1921–22 season. He signed for Lincoln City of the Football League Third Division North in August 1922.

He made his debut in the opening match of the season, on 26 August 1922 in a 3–1 defeat away to Halifax Town, and missed only two matches between then and 3 February 1923. At this point the club found itself unable to pay the players' wages, and without drastic action, was in danger of folding. Meetings were held at which the players were requested to accept half-pay until the position improved. Griffiths refused, and he was one of seven who were paid their outstanding two weeks' wages of £10 and released on a free transfer. He had seven goals at this stage, and that was enough to make him Lincoln's joint top scorer for the season alongside Harry Pringle.

Griffiths returned to the north-east of England where he scored 10 goals for Jarrow of the North-Eastern League in what remained of the season. Trials with Darlington and Hartlepools United came to nothing, but he was able to make a return, albeit brief, to the Football League with Ashington. He went straight into the league side for a 4–0 defeat away to Wrexham, Tom Robertson reclaimed the centre-forward position for the next match, and Griffiths was restricted to Northern Alliance football with Ashington's reserves until he returned to Jarrow in February 1924.

The 1939 Register records Griffiths employed as a labourer in an iron foundry and living in Saltburn Gardens, Wallsend, with his wife, Elizabeth, and two children. He died in 1950.
