= St Helens Town A.F.C. (1901) =

Former association football club

St Helens Town Football Club
- Full name: St Helens Town
- Nickname: the Town
- Founded: 1901
- Dissolved: 1915/1928
- Ground: Primrose Ground
- Chairman: Peter Phythian
1905–13 colours

St Helens Town A.F.C. was an association football club from St Helens, founded in 1901. It was admitted to the Lancashire League in its first season and later competed in the Lancashire Combination, where it won promotion to the first division three times. Its best first-division finish was 13th in 1911–12. The club also entered the FA Cup and twice reached the quarter-finals of the Lancashire Senior Cup, including wins over Bolton Wanderers and Everton.

In 1911, St Helens Town applied to join the English Football League as part of a proposed expansion, but the plan was rejected. Financial difficulties led the club to withdraw from the Lancashire Combination after the 1913–14 season. It continued in the Liverpool & District League in 1914–15 but did not appear after that season. A revival in 1925 lasted three years.

== History ==
St Helens Town was formed in June 1901, proposed by the mayor of St Helens (Alderman Forster) on the basis that "a well-conducted and properly managed football organisation in St Helens would be for the benefit of the working classes"; the new club was promptly admitted to the Lancashire League, ahead of the slightly more established St Helens Recs, which was presumably considered too much of a works team rather than a town club. The Townites were also boosted by the disbanding of Lancashire Alliance champions Parr A.F.C., as it recruited a number of players (goalkeeper Hay, full-back Stirrup, forward Halpin, and full-back/half-back brothers G. and R. Lee) from their ranks.

The club's first match was a home friendly with Liverpool, attended by 3,000 spectators, and won by the visitors 3–0. It entered the 1901–02 FA Cup qualifying rounds and reached the third stage, where it lost 5–2 at Glossop.

After two mid-table seasons, the League was folded into the Lancashire Combination, and Town was put in the second division, alongside its cross-town rivals. Town won promotion in 1903–04, but was relegated after one season, replaced in the top flight by the Recs. Town earned promotion to the top division twice more, in 1908–09 and 1910–11, but the club only ever avoided relegation in two first division seasons, its best finish being 13th out of 17 in 1911–12. Following the 1910–11 season, the club rather optimistically applied to join the Football League, inviting the Recs to combine in the event of a successful bid; the logic was that there was a movement for a new Third Division, and 16 teams applied en masse. The League however postponed consideration of the expansion until December, at which time the measure was defeated by a more than 2 to 1 margin, due to pressure from the Southern Football League.

The club never had as good a run in the FA Cup as in its first entry; in the second qualifying round in 1902–03, it lost 3–0 in a derby against the Recs. Its Lancashire Senior Cup runs were almost as inconsequential, never winning more than two ties in a season, although as the number of entries fluctuated, that was enough to reach the quarter-finals twice, in 1902–03 and 1913–14. Each of these years saw the Town beat a Football League club, namely Bolton Wanderers (thanks to an 88th minute penalty from Grundy) and Everton (a Tommy Jones header from a Benson cross being the only goal of the game) respectively.

The club was in serious financial difficulties in 1913, and only continued for one more season due to the Recs' decision in 1913 to abandon association for rugby league, encouraging the board to try for one final season; however, after finishing the 1913–14 season 17th out of 18 in the Combination top division, albeit just one point short of safety, the club withdrew from the competition, and was reported to have disbanded. The club managed to re-start in the Liverpool & District League but did not appear after the 1914–15 season. A revival in 1925 only lasted three years.

=== Tommy Blackstock ===
The club was involved in a tragic incident in 1907; when the club was playing Manchester United Reserves, United player Tommy Blackstock headed a clearance, whereupon he collapsed and died, an inquest suggesting he had suffered a heart attack.

== Colours ==
The club originally played in blue and white halves; by 1903–04 it had changed to amber and blue, by 1905–06 to red and white halves, and by 1913–14 to red jerseys with white knickers.

== Ground ==
The club played at the Primrose Ground on Park Road, and used the Black Horse pub for facilities.

== Notable players ==
- Bob Kelly, who joined Burnley in 1913 for a transfer fee "much in excess of what has been paid for any of the six or seven who are engaged with Football League teams".
