= Burnley Union Star F.C. =

Former association football club in Lancashire

Burnley Union Stars
- Full name: Burnley Union Stars Football Club
- Nicknames: the Stars, the Local Lads
- Founded: 1881
- Dissolved: 1891
- Ground: Daneshouse
- Secretary: Edwin Whitehead
colours

Burnley Union Star F.C. was an association football club from Burnley, Lancashire, active in the 1880s.

== History ==
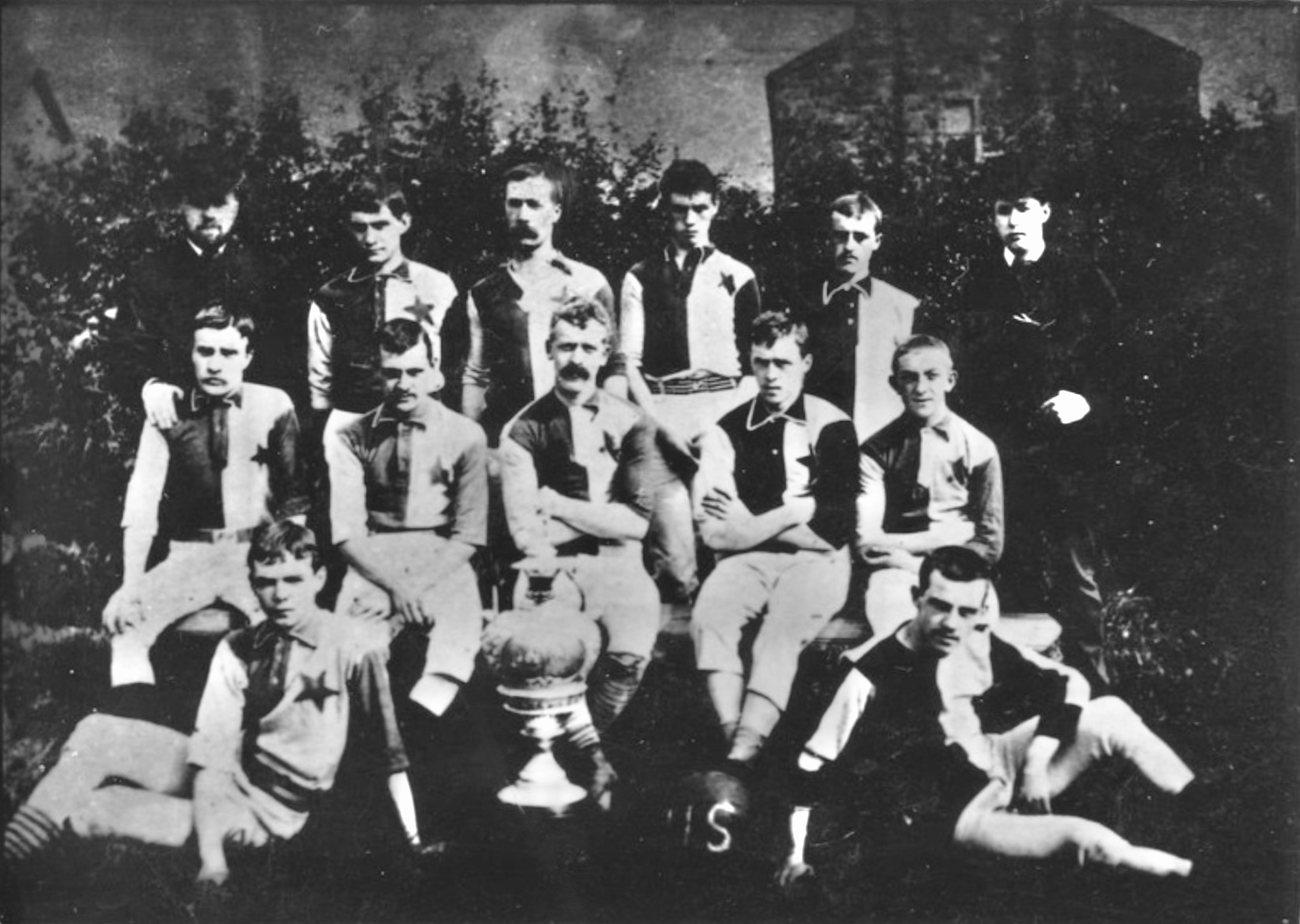
Burnley Union Star FC, with the Burnley Challenge Cup, 1885

The club was founded in 1881 by cotton mill workers in the north of Burnley. Despite starting out as an amateur side in the shadow of the sub rosa professionals of Burnley F.C., the club was one of the many in Lancashire which joined the nascent British Football Association in order to put pressure on the F.A. to legalize professionalism.

Union Star never entered the FA Cup, but did enter the Lancashire Senior Cup from 1884–85 to 1890–91. It reached the quarter finals in 1887–88, losing 6–2 to Darwen Old Wanderers, and 1888–89, being edged 2–1 at Haydock.

Its most controversial tie came in the first round in 1886–87, when it held Burnley to a 2–2 draw, after extra time; Burnley had been forced to play an under-strength side as some of its professional players were ineligible for the tie. However, the Lancashire Football Association expelled the Stars from the competition before a replay could take place, ruling that Westhead (signed from Blackpool South Shore) had not been registered properly, suspending the club for a month and Westhead until further notice. This exacerbated the enmity between the supporters of the two clubs, with Union Star supporters occasionally causing trouble at Turf Moor by supporting the opposition.

The Stars' greatest triumph was winning the Burnley Hospital Challenge Cup in 1885, beating Haggate 3–0 in the final at Turf Moor, before a crowd of over 12,000.

The club started to pay players from 1887–88, with 13 registered professionals; half as many as Burnley, and all of whom were part-time players. Union Star was one of the founder members of the North-East Lancashire League in 1889–90, and finished the season third, after losing to champions Brierfield in the final match. Off the back of that success, the club applied to join the Lancashire League in 1890, but failed in its application; after Blackburn Park Road withdrew, Union Star was successful at the second time of asking However, by that time, the Stars had released most of its players, and the hurriedly-assembled squad was outgunned. At the end of the season, the club, having only won 4 games in 24, was insolvent, and was wound up before the next season.

== Colours ==
The club wore red and white halved shirts, with a red star badge.

== Ground ==
The club played for most of its existence at Rake Head. In April 1890, it moved to Daneshouse, nearer to Burnley town centre. After the club was wound up, Burnley F.C. bought and transported the main stand to Turf Moor, and it was known as the Star Side for some decades afterwards.

== Notable players ==
- John Macaulay, who joined the club from Arthurlie in 1885
- Jack Abrahams and Robert Kay, who both joined the Stars from Burnley in 1889
- Robert Spencer, who emigrated to the United States of America and won three American Cup winners' medals in the 1890s
