= Lancashire FA Challenge Trophy =

- Founded: 1885; 141 years ago
- Region: Lancashire
- Teams: 28
- Current champions: Lancaster City
- Most championships: Chorley (18 wins)

The Lancashire Football Association Challenge Trophy is an English football competition for senior non-league clubs who are members of the Lancashire County Football Association. The trophy was first played for in 1885, when it was known as the Lancashire Junior Cup. It is currently sponsored by Partners Foundation and is known as The Partners Foundation Challenge Trophy.

== Format ==
The competition is open to senior non-league clubs within the historical boundaries of Lancashire. A total of 28 clubs currently enter the competition from six different leagues. As of 2008–09 the four clubs from the Football Conference each receive byes to the second round, where they are then joined by the twelve winners from the first round.

From the 2009–10 season the semi-finals have been played at the County Ground, Thurston Road in Leyland, with the final being held at the Reebok Stadium, home of Bolton Wanderers. The 2011–12 final between Chorley FC and Kendal Town FC, played on 12 March 2012, attracted a crowd of 2,673.

== History ==
The first Lancashire FA Challenge Trophy took place in the 1885–86 season, when Bell's Temperance of Accrington beat Darwen Rovers 6–2 in the final at Fleetwood Rangers.. Before the First World War, the champions mostly came from the Lancashire Combination and the Lancashire League, but on occasion from the lower level Lancashire Alliance, and in 1897 the surprise winner was Hapton from the North-East Lancashire Combination.

The only times the trophy was not competed was 1915–18 during World War I, 1940–41 season during World War II, although it did continue for the rest of the war years, and 2020–21 due to the COVID-19 pandemic. Chorley are the most successful club with eighteen wins, the first coming in 1893–94 and the last of which came in 2017–18. Former non-league clubs Morecambe, who now play in the Football League and Wigan Athletic, now in League One are next with eleven wins. Morecambe's last victory was in 2003–04 and Wigan's last victory was in 1977–78.

== Past winners ==
Season	Winners
1885–86	Bell's Temperance
1886–87	Bell's Temperance
1887–88	Blackpool
1888–89	Oswaldtwistle Rovers
1889–90	Bury
1890–91	Blackpool
1891–92	Kearsley
1892–93	Clitheroe
1893–94	Chorley
1894–95	Lytham
1895–96	Blackburn Park Road
1896–97	Hapton
1897–98	Skerton
1898–99	Skerton
1899–1900	Turton
1900–01	Heywood
1901–02	Turton
1902–03	Turton
1903–04	Earlestown
1904–05	Turton
1905–06	Colne
1906–07	Earlestown
1907–08	Nelson
1908–09	Chorley
1909–10	Rochdale
1910–11	Bacup
1911–12	Rossendale United
1912–13	Fleetwood
1913–14	Heywood United
1914–15	Skelmersdale United
1915–18	(no competition)
1918–19	Runcorn
1919–20	Southport
1920–21	Accrington Stanley
1921–22	New Brighton
1922–23	Croston
1923–24	Chorley
1924–25	Horwich RMI
1925–26	Morecambe
1926–27	Morecambe
1927–28	Lancaster Town
1928–29	Lancaster Town
1929–30	Horwich RMI
1930–31	Lancaster Town
1931–32	Dick, Kerr's
1932–33	Darwen
1933–34	Lancaster Town
1934–35	Fleetwood
1935–36	Wigan Athletic
1936–37	South Liverpool
1937–38	South Liverpool
1938–39	South Liverpool
1939–40	Chorley
1940–41	(no competition)
1941–42	Blackpool Services
1942–43	Blackpool Services
1943–44	Blackpool Services
1944–45	Howard & Bulloughs
1945–46	Chorley
1946–47	Rochdale Reserves
1947–48	Burscough
1948–49	Barrow Reserves
1949–50	Burscough
1950–51	Rochdale Reserves
1951–52	Lancaster City
1952–53	Wigan Athletic
1953–54	Wigan Athletic
1954–55	Nelson
1955–56	Wigan Athletic
1956–57	New Brighton
1957–58	Chorley
1958–59	Chorley
1959–60	Wigan Athletic
1960–61	Chorley
1961–62	Morecambe
1962–63	Morecambe
1963–64	Chorley
1964–65	Chorley
1965–66	Wigan Athletic
1966–67	Burscough
1967–68	Wigan Athletic
1968–69	Morecambe
1969–70	Skelmersdale United
1970–71	Skelmersdale United
1971–72	Wigan Athletic
1972–73	Rossendale United
1973–74	Wigan Athletic
1974–75	Lancaster City
1975–76	Chorley
1976–77	Wigan Athletic
1977–78	Wigan Athletic
1978–79	Marine
1979–80	Chorley
1980–81	Barrow
1981–82	Chorley
1982–83	Chorley
1983–84	South Liverpool
1984–85	Clitheroe
1985–86	Morecambe
1986–87	Morecambe
1987–88	Marine
1988–89	Colne Dynamoes
1989–90	Colne Dynamoes
1990–91	Marine
1991–92	Great Harwood Town
1992–93	Southport
1993–94	Morecambe
1994–95	Bamber Bridge
1995–96	Morecambe
1996–97	Southport
1997–98	Southport
1998–99	Morecambe
1999–2000	Marine
2000–01	Southport
2001–02	Accrington Stanley
2002–03	Leigh RMI
2003–04	Morecambe
2004–05	Accrington Stanley
2005–06	Southport
2006–07	Burscough
2007–08	Southport
2008–09	Skelmersdale United
2009–10	Southport
2010–11	AFC Fylde
2011–12	Chorley
2012–13	AFC Fylde
2013–14	AFC Fylde
2014–15	Chorley
2015-16	Chorley
2016–17	Ashton Athletic
2017-18	Chorley
2018-19	Southport
2019-20	Lancaster City
2020-21	Competition not held
2021-22	Southport
2022-23	Southport
2023-24	Colne
2024-25	Southport
2025-26	Lancaster City

== Winners by club ==
	Club	Number of Wins	Most Recent Win
1	Chorley	18	2017-18
2	Southport	12	2024-25
3	Morecambe	11	2003–04
	Wigan Athletic	11	1977–78
5	Lancaster City (inc. Lancaster Town)	8	2025 - 26
6	Burscough	4	2006–07
	Marine	4	1999–2000
	South Liverpool	4	1983–84
	Turton	4	1904–05
	Skelmersdale United	4	2008–09
11	Accrington Stanley	3	2004–05
	AFC Fylde	3	2013–14
	Blackpool Services	3	1943–44
	Leigh RMI (inc. Horwich RMI)	3	2002–03
	Rochdale (inc. Rochdale Reserves)	3	1950–51
16	Barrow (inc. Barrow Reserves)	2	1980–81
	Bell's Temperance	2	1886–87
	Blackpool	2	1890–91
	Colne Dynamoes	2	1989–90
	Earlestown	2	1906–07
	Fleetwood	2	1934–35
	Nelson	2	1989–90
	New Brighton	2	1906–07
	Rossendale United	2	1972–73
	Skerton	2	1898–99
26	Bacup Borough (as Bacup)	1	1910–11
	Bamber Bridge	1	1994–95
	Blackburn Park Road	1	1895–96
	Bury	1	1889–90
	Clitheroe (1887)	1	1892–93
	Clitheroe (1925)	1	1984–85
	Colne (1903)	1	1905–06
	Colne (1996)	1	2023–24
	Croston	1	1922–23
	Darwen	1	1932–33
	Dick, Kerr's	1	1931–32
	Great Harwood Town	1	1991–92
	Hapton	1	1896–97
	Heywood	1	1900–01
	Heywood United	1	1913–14
	Howard & Bulloughs	1	1944–45
	Kearsley	1	1891–92
	Lytham	1	1894–95
	Oswaldtwistle Rovers	1	1888–89
	Runcorn	1	1918–19
	Ashton Athletic	1	2016–17
