= Geoff Collier =

English footballer

Personal information
- Full name: Geoffrey Heywood Collier
- Date of birth: 25 July 1950 (age 76)
- Place of birth: Blackpool, England
- Position: Forward

Senior career*
Years	Team	Apps	(Gls)
19??–1970	Norcross		
1970–1971	Blackpool Wren Rovers		
1971–1972	Fleetwood		
1972–1973	Macclesfield Town	21	(9)
1973–1974	Notts County	3	(0)
1974–1976	Macclesfield Town	66	(24)
- * Club domestic league appearances and goals

Geoffrey Heywood Collier (born 25 July 1950) is an English former footballer who played as a forward in the Football League for Notts County.

Collier was born in Blackpool, and began his football career with Norcross and Blackpool Wren Rovers, with whom he won the 1970–71 West Lancashire League and Lancashire Amateur Shield. After two seasons in the Northern Premier League with Fleetwood and Macclesfield Town, with whom he won the Cheshire Senior Cup in 1973, Collier attracted attention from bigger clubs, and signed for Notts County of the Football League Second Division. He made his debut as a substitute in a 2–1 home win against Fulham, and appeared twice more, each time as a substitute, before returning to Macclesfield, where he was top scorer in both 1974–75 and 1975–76.
