= Lancashire County Football Association =

Governing body of association football in Lancashire, England

- Formation: 1878
- Headquarters: The County Ground; Thurston Road
- Location(s): Leyland; Lancashire PR25 2LF
- Chief Executive: Simon Gerrard
- Website: lancashirefa.com

The Lancashire County Football Association, also known simply as the Lancashire FA, is the governing body of football within the historical county boundaries of Lancashire, England. They are responsible for the governance and development of football at all levels in the county.

== History and organisation ==
The Lancashire County FA was formed on 28 September 1878 at a meeting held one Saturday afternoon in the parlour of The Volunteer Inn, Bromley Cross.

The LFA runs a number of different cup competitions catering for the various levels of football played throughout the county, which is based on the historic county boundaries of Lancashire, before the 1974 county boundary re-organisation, rather than the current administrative county boundaries and so includes Barrow-in-Furness to the north and Manchester, Rochdale, Oldham and Liverpool to the south. Warrington, historically part of Lancashire, is not administered by the Lancashire FA and is instead covered by the Cheshire FA. The administrative area covered by the Lancashire County FA overlaps with areas covered by Manchester FA and Liverpool FA. According to the Memorandum on Areas and Overlapping of Associations the Manchester FA covers the area 12 miles from Manchester Town Hall and is confined to Lancashire. The Liverpool FA covers 18 miles in Lancashire and 8 miles in Cheshire from Liverpool Town Hall. In addition in an agreement with the Cumberland FA the Lancashire FA received eight clubs in the South Cumberland area of Millom from the end of season 1969/70.

The county is divided into nine areas with each area having one member on the LFA Council. The divisions are as follows:

Division 1: Burnley – Pendle – Rossendale
Division 2: Blackburn with Darwen – Hyndburn – Ribble Valley
Division 3: Bolton
Division 4: Bury – Rochdale
Division 5: Chorley – Liverpool – West Lancashire
Division 6: Preston – South Ribble – Blackpool – Fylde
Division 7: Oldham – Manchester
Division 8: Barrow – Lancaster – Wyre
Division 9: St Helens – Wigan – Warrington

The Lancashire FA governs 100 leagues, 4,000 teams and 1,500 referees.

== Lancashire County Schools team ==
In the 2005–06 season the Lancashire County FA Schools team won the English Schools' Football Association Under-16 Inter County Trophy. In the semi-final held at Victoria Park, Burscough, Lancashire beat Leicestershire & Rutland County Schools FA 3–1. They then beat Devon County Schools FA 2–1 in the final which was held at Ewood Park in Blackburn on 11 May 2006.

== County Ground ==
The Lancashire FA are based at the County Ground, Thurston Road in Leyland. They moved their headquarters to the County Ground in 1998 from Blackburn.

The County Ground is the current home of Bolton Wanderers reserve team, who play in the Premier Reserve League and who, in the 2009–10 season, play in the North Division. The club also use the ground for all their home matches in the Manchester Senior Cup. The county representative team and county youth team also use the ground for home matches, and up until the 2009–2010 season County Cup finals were played at the County Ground. The ground has a 500-seater covered stand.

Facilities include an all-weather pitch as well as six corporate rooms, the largest of which, the Tom Finney Suite, can seat up to 100.

== Affiliated Leagues ==
=== Men's Saturday Leagues ===
- Accrington Combination
- Blackburn and District Combination
- East Lancashire League
- Furness Premier League
- Lancashire League
- Lancashire Amateur League
- Mid Lancashire and District League
- North Lancashire & District Football League
- Rochdale Alliance League
- SportsReach League
- West Lancashire League

=== Ladies and Girls Leagues ===
- Lancashire FA Women's County League
- Lancashire Girls League
- West Lancashire Girls League

=== Other Leagues ===
- Bolton Sports Federation Over 35 Veterans League
- Lancashire Ability Counts
- Lancaster University Inter College Men’s League

=== Men's Sunday Leagues ===
- Blackburn Sunday League
- Blackpool and Fylde Sunday Alliance
- Burnley and District Sunday League
- Bury and District Sunday League
- Chorley Nissan Sunday League
- Harry Dewhurst Memorial Sunday League
- Middleton and District Sunday League
- Lancashire Evening Post Sunday League
- Ormskirk and District Sunday League
- Pendle Charity League
- Skelmersdale and District Sunday League
- South Lancashire Counties League

=== Small Sided Leagues ===
- Blackburn Community 7-a-side League
- Furness Futebol – Barrow-in-Furness
- Lancashire FA County 6ixes
- PSL Soccer Leagues
- Soccer Burnley 5's
- Soccer Sixes

- Blackburn
- Lancaster
- Morecambe
- Preton

- Leisure Leagues

- Garstang - Longridge - Colne

=== Youth Leagues ===
- Lancashire FA Under 18 Floodlight League
- Accrington and District Junior League
- Barrow and District Junior League
- Blackpool and District Youth
- Bolton and Bury Junior Football League
- Bury & Radcliffe Junior League
- East Lancashire Alliance
- Craven Minor Junior League
- Central Lancashire Junior League
- Lancaster and Morecambe Service to Youth League
- Lune and District Junior League
- Mid Lancashire Colts Junior League
- North Bury Junior League
- North Valley Youth League
- Poulton and District Primary League
- Preston City Development League
- Rochdale and Oldham Youth League
- Skelmersdale Junior League
- Warburton Youth League
- Wigan & District Youth League

== Disbanded Leagues ==
A number of leagues that were affiliated to the Lancashire FA have disbanded or amalgamated with other leagues including:

- Lancashire Combination
- Bolton & District Amateur Combination
- Bolton Boys and Girls Federation
- Fylde District League
- Lancashire Palatine League
- Lancaster and Morecambe Grassroots Sunday League
- Leigh & District Amateur League
- Morecambe & Lancaster Sunday Football League
- Preston Churches League
- Blackburn & Darwen Junior League
- Hindley & District Junior League
- Hyndburn & District Boys League

== Members ==
=== Full members ===
There are 79 clubs who have full membership of the Lancashire FA. These are –

- Accrington Stanley
- A.F.C. Blackpool
- A.F.C. Darwen
- AFC Fylde
- Ashton Athletic
- Atherton Collieries
- Atherton Laburnum Rovers
- Atherton Town
- BAC/EE/Springfields
- Bacup Borough
- BAE Systems Barrow
- Bamber Bridge
- Barrow
- Blackburn Rovers
- Blackpool
- Blackpool Wren Rovers
- Blackrod Town
- Bolton Wanderers
- Bolton Wyresdale
- Breightmet United
- Bridge Celtic FC, Adlington
- Burnley
- Burnley United
- Burscough
- Bury
- Charnock Richard
- Chorley
- Clitheroe
- Collegiate Old Boys
- Croston Sports Club
- Daisy Hill
- Dalton United
- Eagley
- Everton
- Fleetwood Town
- Fulwood Amateurs
- Golborne Sports
- Hesketh Bank
- Hesketh Casuals
- Hindsford
- Holker Old Boys
- Lancashire Constabulary
- Lancaster City
- Leigh Genesis
- Liverpool
- Lytham St. Annes & Fylde YMCA F.C.
- Manchester City
- Manchester United
- Marine
- Merseyside Police
- Mill Hill St. Peters
- Morecambe
- Nelson
- Norcross & Warbreck
- Old Blackburnians
- Old Boltonians
- Old Xaverians
- Oldham Athletic
- Oldham Hulmeians
- Padiham
- Poulton Town
- Preston North End
- Prestwich Heys
- Radcliffe Borough
- Ramsbottom United
- Rochdale
- Rochdale Town
- Rochdale St. Clements
- Rossendale United
- Skelmersdale United
- Southport
- Southport Trinity
- Squires Gate
- Tranmere Rovers
- Turton
- Walshaw Sports
- Whalley Range
- Wigan Athletic
- Woodbank
- Wyre Villa
- Wythenshawe Amateurs

=== Associate members ===
Clubs who are associate members of the Lancashire FA include:-

- Coppull United
- Euxton Villa
- Fleetwood Hesketh
- Freckleton
- Freehold
- Garstang
- Kendal Town
- The Pleasant Inn (Royton)

== County Cups ==
The Lancashire FA currently organises nineteen County Cup competitions.

Competition	Current Sponsor	2014-2015 Holders
Lancashire FA Challenge Cup (Senior Cup)
Lancashire FA Challenge Trophy (Junior Cup)	The Co-operative Group	
Lancashire FA Professional Youth Cup	(no sponsor)	Preston North End F.C.
Lancashire FA Amateur Shield	(no sponsor)	Coppull United
Lancashire FA Amateur Cup	Sharrocks	Blessed Sacrament
Lancashire FA Sunday Trophy	Maxlocal	Poulton Youth
Lancashire FA Women's Knock-Out Cup	Nayler Group	Blackburn Rovers Ladies
Lancashire FA Under-18 Youth Cup	(no sponsor)	Ulverston Rangers Juniors U18
Lancashire FA Under-16 Youth Cup	Rigby Taylor	Aston U16
Lancashire FA Under-15 Youth Cup	(no sponsor)	Myerscough College J.F.D.C. U15
Lancashire FA Under-14 Youth Cup	Milano	Lytham St. Annes Y.M.C.A. U14
Lancashire FA Under-13 Youth Cup	(no sponsor)	Mill Hill (Blackburn) U13
Lancashire FA Under-12 Youth Cup	Solidstrip	Ladybridge U12 Pumas
Lancashire FA Under-16 Girls Knockout Cup	Tesco	Preston North End Women's (Juniors) U15 Blues
Lancashire FA Under-14 Girls Knockout Cup	Tesco	Preston North End Women's (Juniors) U14
Lancashire FA Under-18 Inter-League Cup	(no sponsor)	Preston & District League
Lancashire FA Under-16 Inter-League Cup	(no sponsor)	East Lancashire Alliance
Lancashire FA Under-14 Inter-League Cup	(no sponsor)	Craven Minor League
Lancashire FA Under-12 Inter-League Cup	(no sponsor)	Wigan & District Youth League

== Recent Lancashire County FA Cup Competition Winners ==
Season	Lancashire FA Senior Cup	Lancashire FA Challenge Trophy	Lancashire FA Amateur Shield	Lancashire FA Amateur Cup
2005–06	Oldham Athletic	Southport	Kirkham & Wesham	
2006–07	Blackburn Rovers	Burscough	Charnock Richard	
2007–08	Manchester United	Southport	Euxton Villa	
2008–09	Manchester United	Skelmersdale United	Little Lever Sports Club	
2009–10	Liverpool	Southport	Blackpool Wren Rovers	Hurst Green
2010–11	Blackburn Rovers			
2011–12	Manchester United			
2012–13	Manchester United			
2013–14	Bury			Prestwich FC
2014–15	Bury			
2015–16	Everton			
2016–17	Liverpool			
2017–18	Bury			
