= Turf Moor =

Football stadium in Burnley, Lancashire, England

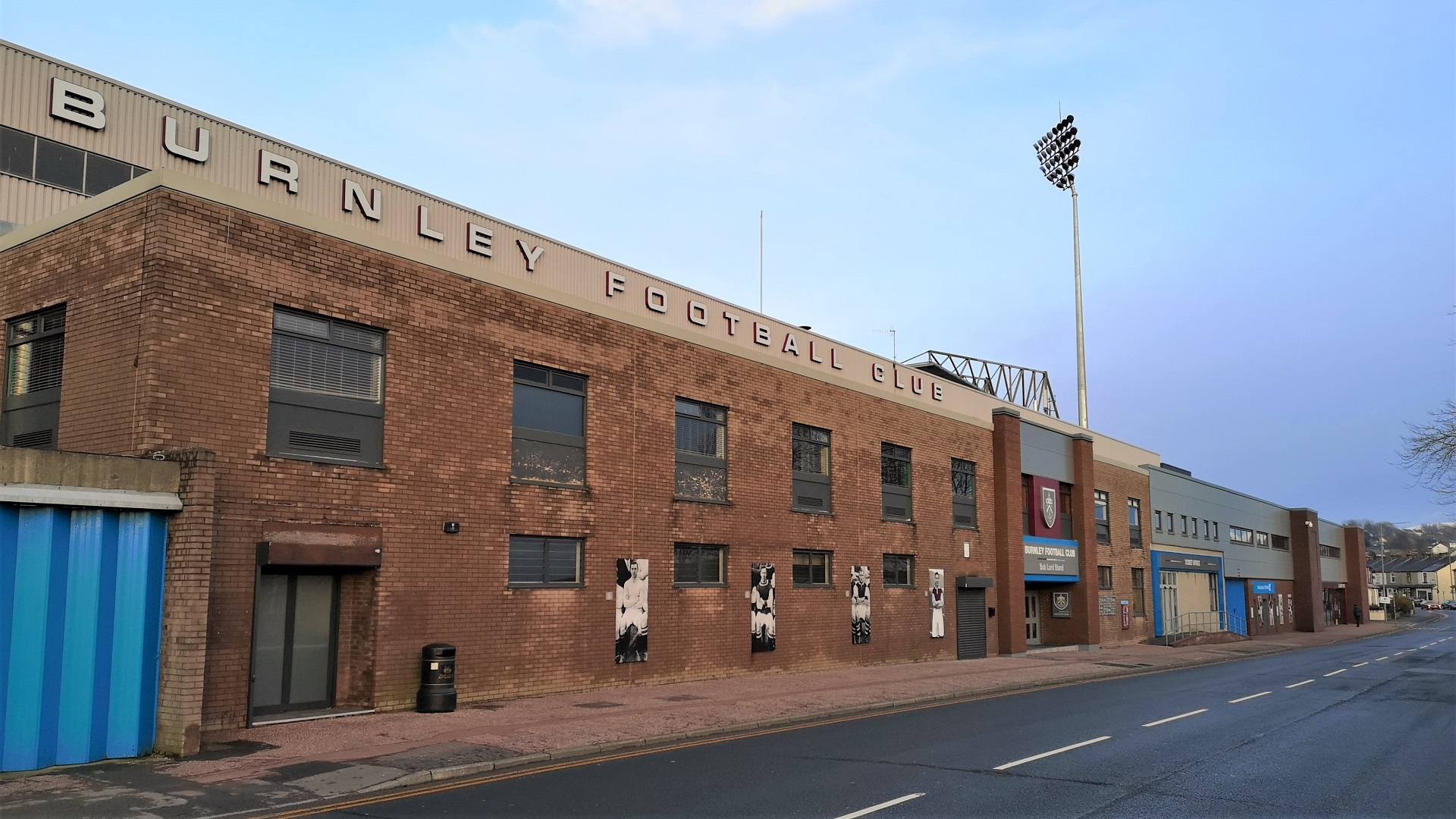
- View of Turf Moor from Harry Potts Way

- Location in Burnley Location in Lancashire
- Address: 52-56 Harry Potts Way
- Location: Burnley; Lancashire, England; BB10 4BX
- Coordinates: 53°47′21″N 2°13′49″W
- Owner: Burnley F.C.
- Operator: Burnley F.C.
- Capacity: 21,944
- Surface: Desso GrassMaster
- Record attendance: 54,775 (Burnley vs Huddersfield Town, 23 February 1924)
- Field size: 105 by 68 metres (114.8 yd × 74.4 yd)

Construction
- Built: 1883
- Opened: 17 February 1883

Tenants
- Burnley F.C. (1883–present); Burnley Belvedere F.C. (1902–1904); Burnley F.C. Women (2026–present)

Turf Moor is an association football stadium in Burnley, Lancashire, England, which has been the home of Burnley F.C. since 1883. This unbroken service makes Turf Moor the second-longest continuously used ground in English professional football. The stadium is situated on Harry Potts Way, named after the manager who won the 1959–60 First Division with the club, and has a capacity of 21,944.

The Turf Moor site has been used for sporting activities since at least 1843, when Burnley Cricket Club moved to the area. In 1883, they invited Burnley to use a pitch adjacent to the cricket field. The first grandstand was not built until 1885, while terraces were also added to each end of the ground in the same year. Between the mid-1950s and mid-1970s, all stands were rebuilt. Turf Moor underwent further refurbishment during the 1990s, when the Longside and the Bee Hole End terraces were replaced by all-seater stands following the recommendations of the Taylor Report. The ground comprises four stands: the Bob Lord Stand, the Cricket Field Stand, the North Stand and the Jimmy McIlroy Stand.

In 1886, Turf Moor became the first football ground to be visited by a member of the Royal Family, when Prince Albert Victor attended a friendly match between Burnley and Bolton Wanderers. The first Football League match at the ground took place in October 1888; Burnley's Fred Poland scored the first league goal at the stadium. In 1922, Turf Moor hosted its only FA Cup semi-final and, in 1927, it was the venue of an international match between England and Wales. The stadium's record attendance was set in 1924, when 54,775 people attended an FA Cup third-round game between Burnley and Huddersfield Town.

== History ==
=== Early years and construction ===
Burnley is in Lancashire in Northern England on the edge of the Pennines; its River Brun drains the moors to the east. During the Middle Ages, the Turf Moor area was one of the town's commons and the inhabitants probably cut turf here for fuel. Sport has been played at the Turf Moor site since at least 1843, when Burnley Cricket Club made it their home. Before 1840, there was a short-lived attempt to host an annual horse (turf) race. In 1878, rugby football club Burnley Rovers (Note: The Burnley Advertiser reported on 26 September 1874 that a rugby football team named "The Burnley Rovers Football Club" had "just been formed", already having 35 members. On 18 May 1882, Burnley Rovers voted for a shift to association football; the suffix "Rovers" was dropped several days later, and the club was simply known as Burnley F.C. at the time of its first recorded match on 10 August 1882.) played a side from Bacup on the cricket field in an evening match to demonstrate electric lighting. The pitch was surrounded by only three lamps which were powered by a small engine; the experiment cost £39 (the equivalent of £4,000 as of 2025 (Note: UK Consumer Price Index inflation figures from 1209–2024 based on data from "Inflation calculator". Bank of England. London. 18 February 2026.)) but was unsuccessful as the darkness caused many spectators to leave early. In January 1883, the cricket club leased seven acres of land between the cricket field and Bee Hole Colliery to the east. The following month, they invited association football team Burnley to move from their original home at Calder Vale to the pitch adjacent to the cricket field at Turf Moor, which offered superior facilities and a more central location. The cricket club also donated £65 (the equivalent of £7,000 as of 2025) toward the setup costs, partly to provide its members with an organised winter sport. Burnley played their first match at Turf Moor on 17 February but lost 6–3 against Rawtenstall; according to a local newspaper, "a high wind made correct play impossible". Committee member Charles Riley subsequently appointed himself Turf Moor's first groundsman.

Attendances during the early years averaged around 2,000, although a crowd of 12,000 was at the ground in March 1884 to see Burnley play local rivals Padiham. Spectators had to congregate around the pitch or watch from the hill at the back of Turf Moor, so in 1885, the club built an 800-seater wooden grandstand along the south side of the ground, along Brunshaw Road (as it was then known), and installed uncovered standing areas (terraces) for 5,000 people at each end of the pitch. In the same year, a dispute broke out as the cricketers complained that the footballers left the shared dressing room uncleaned and did not pay toward repairs. In October 1886, Turf Moor became the first football ground to be visited by a member of the Royal Family, when Prince Albert Victor attended a friendly between Burnley and Bolton Wanderers while he was in the town to open a new hospital.

The Football League, the world's first professional league, was founded in 1888, and Burnley were one of its 12 founder members. Turf Moor hosted its first league match on 6 October, an encounter between Burnley and Bolton Wanderers. Burnley forward Fred Poland scored the first league goal at the ground after five minutes, and the home side went on to defeat Bolton 4–1. In 1889, after more disputes, Burnley separated from the cricket club and agreed to pay £77 per year (the equivalent of £9,000 as of 2025) to rent the stadium, and subsequently increased their ticket prices from four to six pence (the equivalent of £2.78 as of 2025) to the dissatisfaction of the supporters. In 1891, local rivals Burnley Union Star disbanded and vacated their ground, which included a grandstand. Burnley bought the stand and moved it to the north side of Turf Moor, where it became known as the Star Stand. Turf Moor hosted its first floodlit football match in March of the same year, between Burnley and Nelson; 16 creosote-fuelled lamps were placed on poles at intervals along the sides of the pitch. Spectators reported that while the edges of the field were sufficiently lit, there was a dark area in the centre.

The Star Stand was demolished in 1898 and replaced by a larger grandstand, which continued to be referred to as the Star Stand by the supporters. In 1903, Burnley built a second tier on the Brunshaw Road Stand to accommodate club offices, and in September of that year, the club hosted its first annual general meeting at Turf Moor. The Star Stand was extended in 1909 with new turnstiles and barricades erected in preparation for the FA Cup quarter-final game against reigning Football League champions Manchester United. In 1911, the club unveiled plans for the rebuilding of the Brunshaw Road Stand, with former Burnley forward Arthur Bell being the architect for the project. A strike amongst railway workers delayed the deliveries of steelwork for the new roof but spectators were still able to use the stand in time for Burnley's first league game of the 1911–12 season against Leeds City. Work on the dressing rooms had not been completed so players from both teams changed in the adjoining cricket pavilion. The stand cost the club £5,000 (the equivalent of £509,000 as of 2025) and could accommodate over 5,500 spectators, including 2,200 seated places. By this time an L-shaped embankment had been constructed, possibly with spoil from the coal mine, stretching from the eastern goal around the northeast corner to the halfway line.

=== Development and decline ===
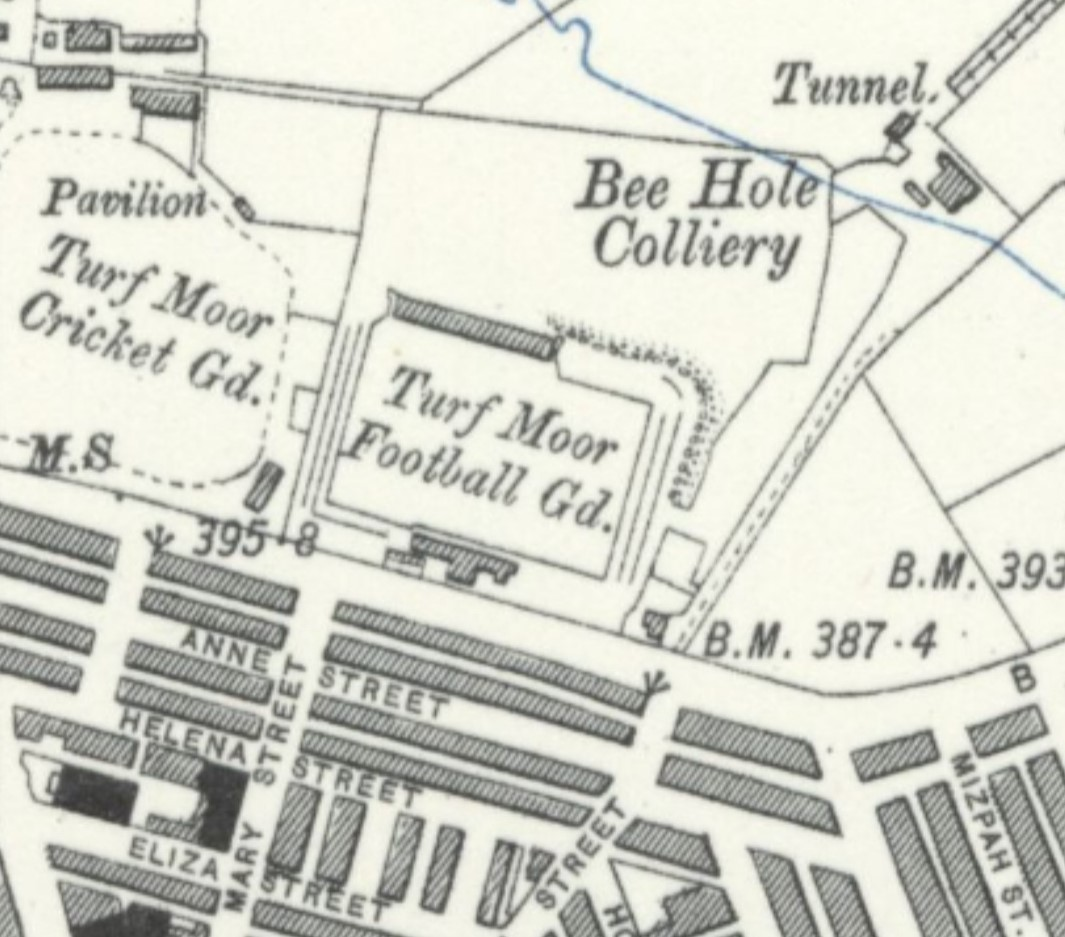
Turf Moor featured on an Ordnance Survey map in 1913

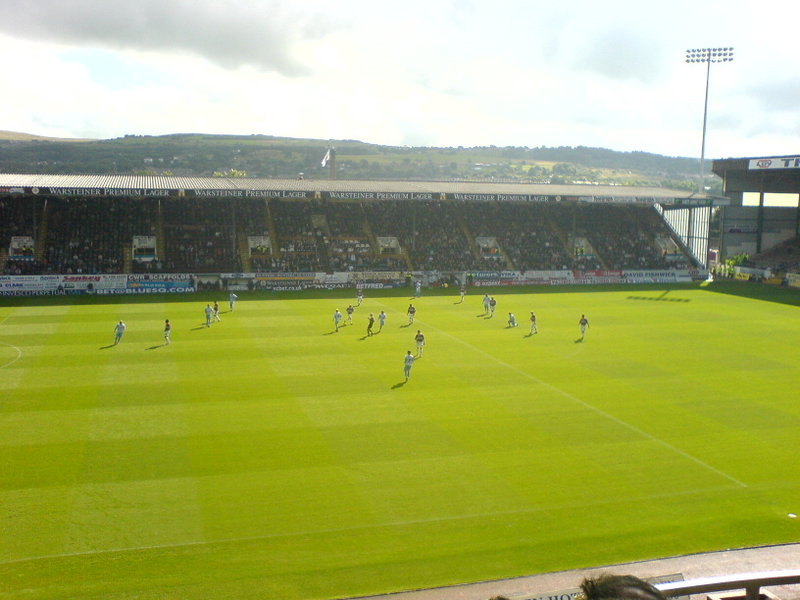
The pitch and the Bob Lord Stand

In 1913, the Burnley directors decided to demolish the Star Stand for a second time and opted instead to expand the uncovered embankment. The Brunshaw Road Stand was also extended to run the whole length of the pitch. In 1914, a roof was constructed to cover the terracing at the Cricket Field End. The developments increased the ground's capacity to around 50,000, almost equal to the town's male population. Burnley won the FA Cup during the same year, and they were crowned First Division champions in 1920–21. During that season, the team went unbeaten in 30 consecutive league matches—at that time an English record—and won 18 consecutive games at Turf Moor. The average home attendance was more than 30,000, a then club record. In 1922, Turf Moor hosted its only FA Cup semi-final, with around 46,000 spectators watching Huddersfield Town defeat Notts County 3–1. The Football Association demanded that the pitch be lengthened to 115 yards (105 m) for the match, although afterwards it was returned to its original 111 yards (101 m). That same year, Burnley bought Turf Moor for £4,500 (the equivalent of £221,000 as of 2025) at a Thursby Estates auction. The club also acquired the adjoining cricket ground. On 23 February 1924, Burnley beat Huddersfield 1–0 in the FA Cup third round in front of 54,775 supporters, still the record for Turf Moor. The ground hosted its only senior international fixture three years later when England played Wales. The Englishmen lost 2–1 after Burnley captain Jack Hill scored an own goal to give the visitors the win. In 1932, a hut and scoreboard were installed at the Bee Hole End embankment—named after the Bee Hole Colliery—with funds from Burnley's newly founded supporters' club.

In 1938, the club announced that a covered terrace would be built on the site of the old Star Stand. The plan was delayed by the outbreak of the Second World War, but the new Longside terrace was eventually completed in 1954. Constructed on the four-decade-old embankment, the club spent £20,000 (the equivalent of £475,000 as of 2025) on the roof alone. The terrace was built with help from the Burnley youth players. In 1955, Burnley became one of the first clubs to set up a purpose-built training ground, on 80 acres of farmland at Gawthorpe Hall purchased by their new chairman, Bob Lord. The club installed permanent floodlights in 1957, which were first used during a friendly against local rivals Blackburn Rovers. Around this time, terracing was added to the banking at the Bee Hole End.

Burnley won the First Division title in 1959–60, and as a result, Turf Moor hosted its first ever European Cup match on 16 November 1960; Jimmy Robson and Jimmy McIlroy scored early in the first half as Burnley recorded a 2–0 victory over French side Stade de Reims. In 1969, the Cricket Field Stand was built at a cost of £180,000 (the equivalent of £2.62 million as of 2025) and incorporated the changing rooms, which made Turf Moor one of the few English grounds to have the players' tunnel behind one of the goals. It was the first stand to include oil-fired heating for supporters, with hot air blown through holes under the seats. The system was abandoned after two seasons due to high costs. The club also extended the open terrace at the Bee Hole End in 1970, with the aim of increasing its capacity to around 20,000.

Lord hired Cambridge Soil Services to re-lay the pitch in 1974, and to install new drainage technology and under-soil heating. Neither came into operation as Lord found them uneconomical, partly because of a major rise in oil prices. The pitch was raised, however, and the slope that had existed was minimised. Lord then replaced the Brunshaw Road Stand with a single-tier stand named after himself, which was opened in September 1974 by former prime minister Edward Heath. The Bob Lord Stand could accommodate 2,500 supporters and cost £450,000 (the equivalent of £4.27 million as of 2025). It was partly financed by Martin Dobson's transfer to Everton, leading some fans to dub it the "Martin Dobson Stand". In 1978, Scottish club Celtic visited Turf Moor for the Anglo-Scottish Cup quarter-final first leg match. The Celtic fans rioted and hurled bottles, stones and iron railings, injuring 60 supporters. Burnley won the game 1–0 and defeated the Scots 2–1 in the return leg, securing a 3–1 aggregate victory before going on to win that season's cup final.

A drop in home attendances combined with increased debt caused a rapid decline in the team's fortunes between the late 1970s and the early 1990s. Burnley were left with little money to invest in the stadium's redevelopment and safety work. In 1992, the 17-year-old apprentice footballer Ben Lee was killed when he fell through the roof of the ageing Longside terrace as he tried to retrieve a football during training. The author Simon Inglis noted that the Longside "symbolised how far Turf Moor, once deemed to be so modern, had fallen behind".

=== Conversion to all-seater ===
Following the Hillsborough disaster in 1989, in which a human crush on the terraces of the Hillsborough Stadium resulted in 97 fatalities, the Taylor Report was published. It recommended the introduction of all-seater stadiums in the top two divisions of English football by the start of 1994–95. Burnley competed in the second tier during the 1994–95 season but were relegated to the third tier at the end of the campaign. As a result of their season at the second level, Burnley were granted £2.25 million (the equivalent of £4.63 million as of 2025) by the Football Trust in April 1995 to convert Turf Moor into an all-seater stadium, which had to be spent within 12 months. The club contracted the Lincolnshire-based Linpave company in September 1995 to build two stands in place of the Longside and the Bee Hole End terraces at a total cost of £5.2 million (the equivalent of £10.7 million as of 2025). The last match in front of the Longside was played on 16 September—Burnley won 2–1 against Hull City. The two-tiered North Stand was built in its place and was opened in April 1996 for the visit of Bristol Rovers. It was later renamed the James Hargreaves Stand following a sponsorship agreement. A day after the North Stand had opened, demolition of the Bee Hole End started. The Jimmy McIlroy Stand, named in honour of the former Burnley player, was completed in September 1996 and took the stadium's capacity to 22,619.

In 2006, Burnley sold Turf Moor and the Gawthorpe training ground to Longside Properties to address financial difficulties arising from the 2002 ITV Digital collapse, which had caused the club to lose over 30 per cent of its expected television revenue. Burnley's chairman Barry Kilby owned 51 per cent of Longside Properties' shares. In 2007, the club revealed plans for a £20 million (the equivalent of £33.8 million as of 2025) redevelopment of Turf Moor and Gawthorpe, to be carried out in six phases and expected to be completed by 2010. Among the ideas were the demolition of the Cricket Field and the construction of a stand incorporating a hotel, restaurant, business centre and cricket pavilion. Planning permission for the first phase of development was granted in April 2008, but in October, the club delayed the project as a result of the global financial crisis. The plans were again put on hold in 2010, due to Burnley's relegation from the Premier League and a projected recession.

Turf Moor and Gawthorpe returned to Burnley ownership under co-chairmen John Banaszkiewicz and Mike Garlick in 2013, after support from private investors. Following promotion back to the Premier League in 2014, several stadium alterations followed over the next years, beginning with the relocation of the players' tunnel to the corner between the James Hargreaves and the Cricket Field Stands. In 2016, a new club shop was constructed between the Jimmy McIlroy and Bob Lord Stands as part of a stadium extension, followed in 2019 by the construction of two corner stands for disabled home supporters between the Jimmy McIlroy and both the James Hargreaves and Bob Lord Stands, in order to comply with the Accessible Stadium Guide regulations. In December 2020, the American investment company ALK Capital acquired an 84% stake in Burnley for £170 million in a leveraged takeover. Under the new ownership, the Preston-based ADI installed digital signage and large LED screens at Turf Moor in 2021, while safe standing was introduced in a part of the Cricket Field Stand at the end of the 2023–24 season. The club also made several changes to the stadium ahead of its return to the Premier League in 2025–26, including switching the home and away sections within the Cricket Field Stand and relocating the players' tunnel from the north-west to the south-west corner of the ground.

During a pre-season friendly against Italian side Lazio at Turf Moor in August 2025, Burnley became the first football club in history to live stream a game in immersive virtual reality. (Note: The broadcast, developed by club partner Rezzil, offered viewers a virtual seat inside the ground with a panoramic view of the pitch, live commentary, ambient crowd noise, and real-time visuals including club branding and player kits.)

== Structure and facilities ==
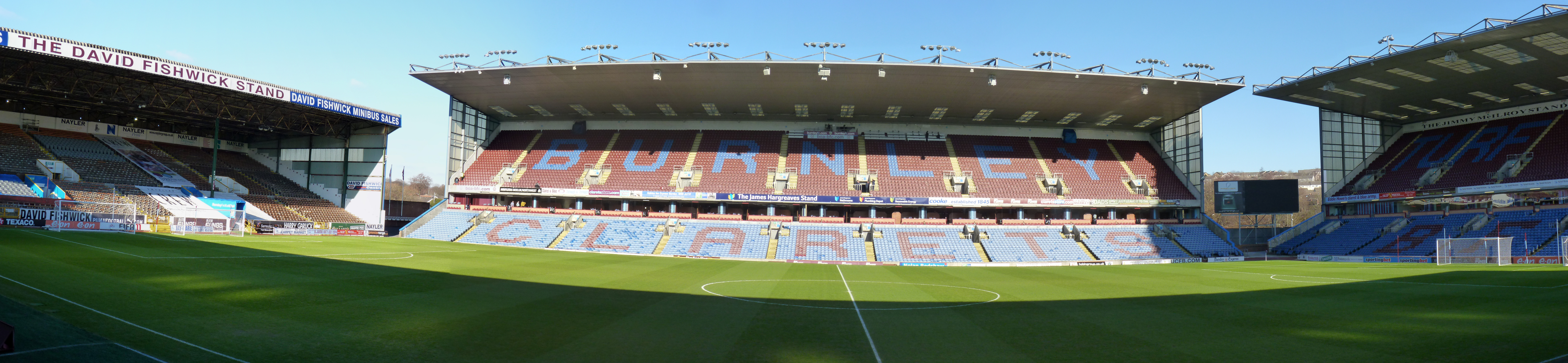
Panorama of Turf Moor (2011), looking north from the Bob Lord Stand, with the Cricket Field Stand to the left, the North Stand opposite and the Jimmy McIlroy Stand to the right

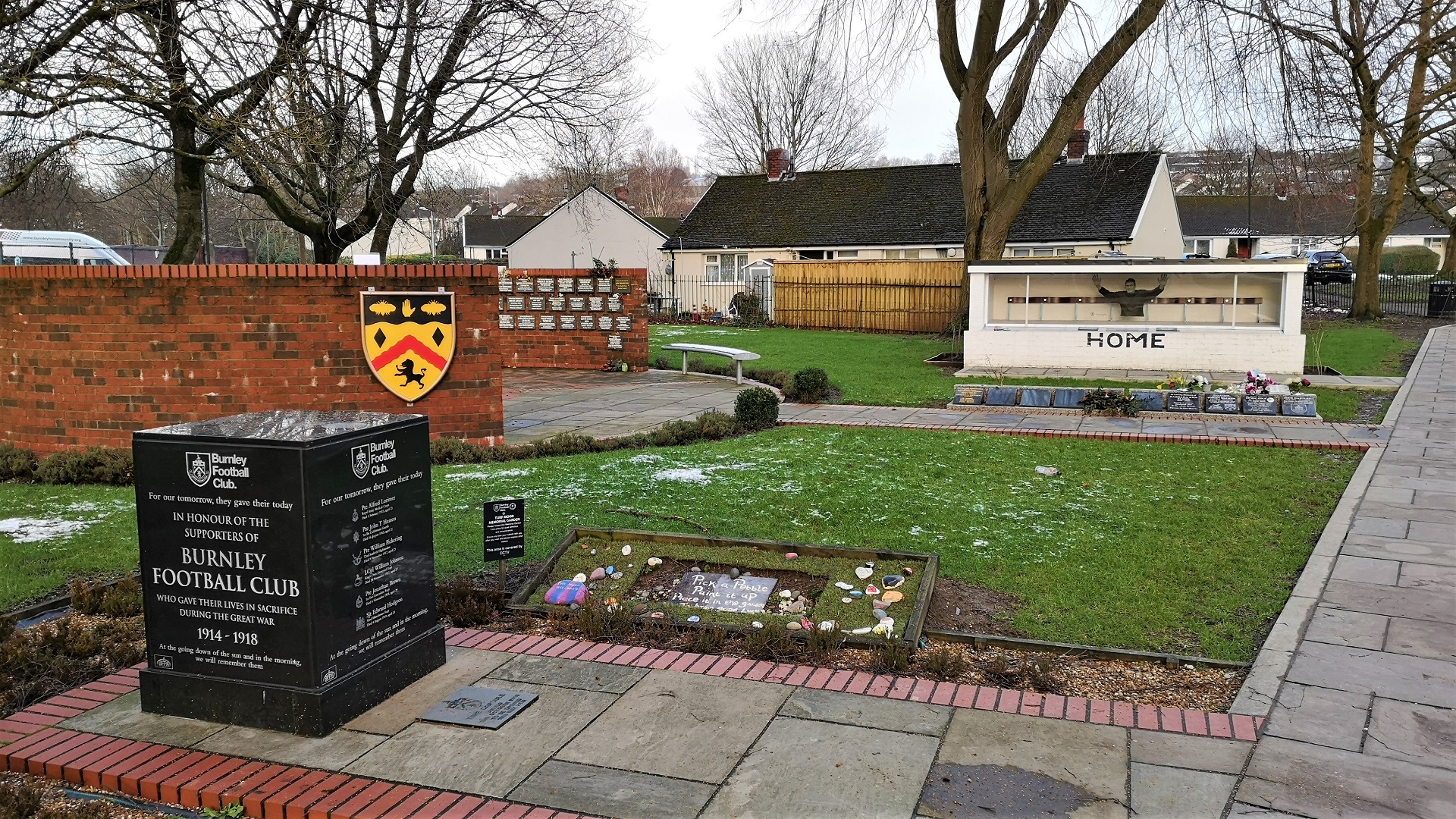
A memorial garden and a dugout replica are located behind the Jimmy McIlroy Stand.

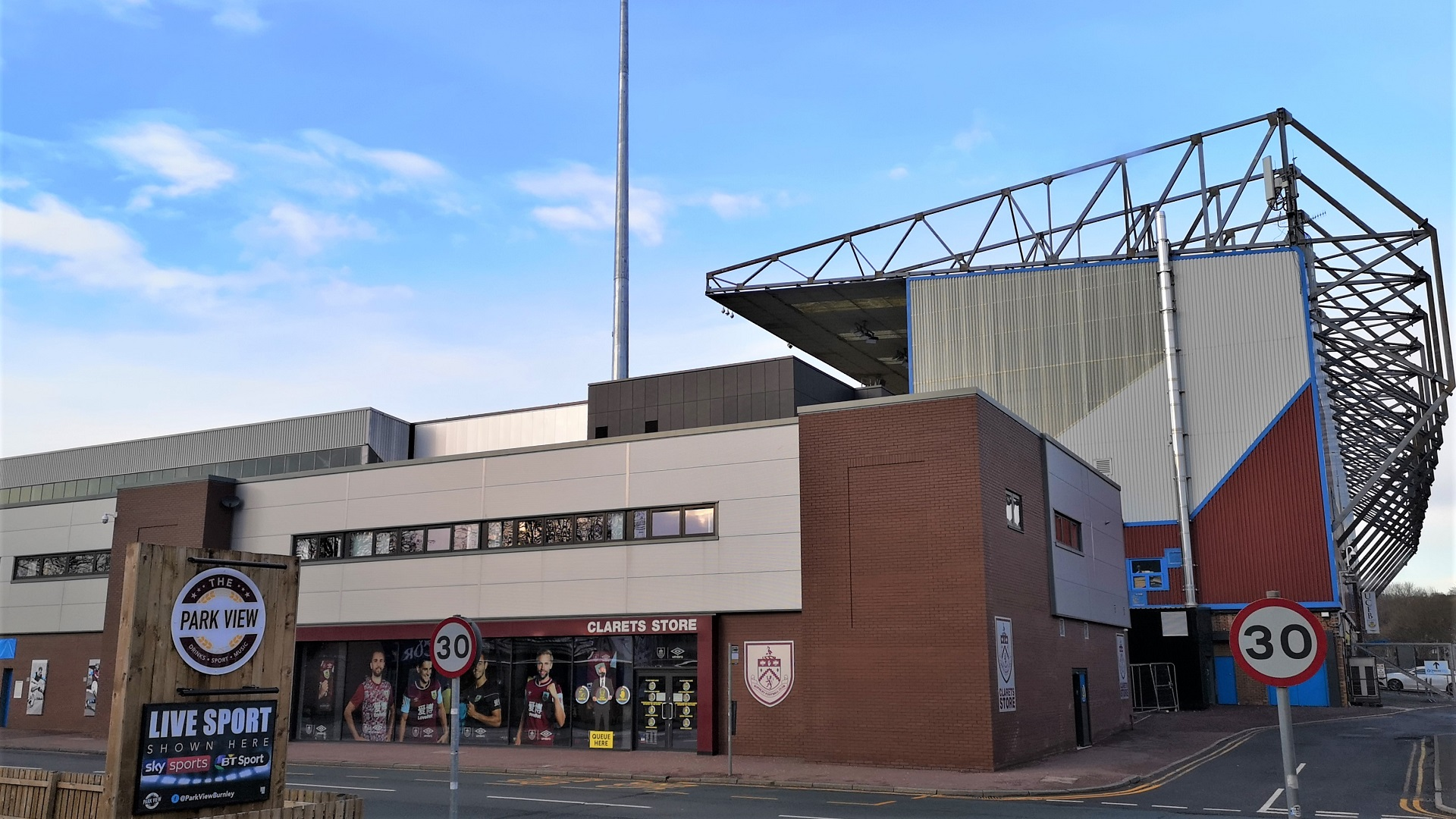
The club shop is situated between the Bob Lord (left) and the Jimmy McIlroy (right) Stands.

Turf Moor's pitch measures 105 by 68 metres (114.8 yd × 74.4 yd) and is surrounded by four stands: the Bob Lord Stand, the Cricket Field Stand, the North Stand and the Jimmy McIlroy Stand. The two newest stands, the North and the Jimmy McIlroy, each have two tiers, while the Bob Lord and the Cricket Field are single-tiered. In 2010, Burnley installed a hybrid grass (Desso GrassMaster) pitch at a cost of £750,000 (the equivalent of £1,160,000 as of 2025), which was funded by revenue from their stay in the Premier League. It replaced the natural grass surface which often cut up during the winter months. The stadium has a capacity of 21,944, which is approximately one seat for every three inhabitants of the town—one of the highest ratios in English football.

The North Stand was constructed in 1996. It can accommodate around 8,000 spectators and runs parallel to the length of the pitch. The television gantry and the press box are both situated at the back of the North. The stand's suite has been licensed since 2005 to hold civil wedding services and it can also be used for banqueting events. The Jimmy McIlroy Stand was erected in 1996 and is situated at the eastern side of the pitch with an approximate capacity of 6,000. Both the North and Jimmy McIlroy Stands contain the stadium's corporate hospitality boxes. The Jimmy McIlroy's upper tier is the designated family area. A memorial garden is located behind the stand and includes a dugout replica with an image of former manager Brian Miller with his hands aloft, which was taken before Burnley's match against Orient in 1987; Burnley defeated their opponents in the final game of the season and avoided relegation from the Football League.

The Bob Lord Stand, constructed in 1974, has a capacity of around 4,000 and runs parallel with Harry Potts Way, named after Harry Potts, the manager who won the 1959–60 First Division title with Burnley. It houses the club's trophy room as well as the directors' box and a corporate area. The Burnley club shop is located between the Bob Lord and Jimmy McIlroy Stands. The Cricket Field, opened in 1969, is Turf Moor's oldest stand. It houses home and away fans and has a capacity of around 4,000. The stand backs onto Burnley Cricket Club's pavilion and contains both teams' dressing rooms and the officials' lounge. Since the 2000s, the Cricket Field Stand has been renamed the David Fishwick Stand, the Ladbrokes Stand and the Barnfield Construction Stand for sponsorship reasons.

In 2011, Burnley opened the world's first higher education institution with university degrees in the football and sports industry. It was named the University Campus of Football Business and was set up at Turf Moor. Other campus locations were later opened at Wembley Stadium (London) and at the City of Manchester Stadium (Manchester).

A popular drink served at Turf Moor since the First World War is "Béné & Hot"—the French liqueur Bénédictine topped up with hot water. The East Lancashire Regiment soldiers acquired a taste for the liqueur while stationed at the birthplace of the beverage in Fécamp, Normandy, during the war. They drank it with hot water to keep warm in the trenches, and the surviving soldiers later returned to East Lancashire with the liqueur. More than 30 bottles are sold at each match, making Burnley one of the world's largest sellers of Bénédictine and Turf Moor the only British football ground to serve it.

== Other events and uses ==
The ground has staged several representative and international fixtures over the years. In 1914, Turf Moor was used for a game between the Football League XI and the Scottish Football League XI, with the Scots beating their English counterparts 3–2. The Football League team featured Burnley players Teddy Hodgson, Eddie Mosscrop and Tommy Boyle, the latter scoring from a penalty kick. In 1922, Turf Moor hosted its only FA Cup semi-final, and in 1927, it staged its only senior international fixture when England met Wales. England B and England's junior sides have also played at the ground on several occasions, at under-21, under-20 and schoolboy levels. The stadium was also a venue for the 1983 UEFA European Under-18 Championship, hosting a group stage match between Czechoslovakia and West Germany.

The England women's national team played their first match at Turf Moor in September 2003 against Australia, which was the stadium's first international women's fixture. Burnley-born Rachel Brown, a Burnley fan, was England's goalkeeper and kept a clean sheet in a 1–0 victory. Women's football at the ground, however, dates back to the early 1920s, when several charity matches were staged. The first took place in March 1920, when Dick Kerr's Ladies played Liverpool Ladies in aid of the National Association of Discharged Sailors and Soldiers. More recently, in April 2023, Burnley F.C. Women played their first match at Turf Moor, winning 2–1 against Liverpool Feds in an FA Women's National League North fixture in front of almost 3,000 supporters. Burnley Women will play all their home games at Turf Moor during the 2026–27 Women's Super League 2 season, the team's first campaign in the second tier of the English women's football pyramid.

Football clubs other than Burnley have played "home" matches at the ground. Between 1902 and 1904, financial difficulties forced Burnley to share Turf Moor with Burnley Belvedere, members of the Lancashire Amateur League. As part of the arrangement, several Belvedere players registered to play for Burnley, as amateurs. In 1993, Accrington Stanley played their FA Cup first-round game against Scunthorpe United at Turf Moor, relocating the match from their Crown Ground home to attract a larger crowd. Turf Moor has also been used for other sporting activities than football, including an exhibition lacrosse match in 1912 and an American football game in 1987.

During the late 1980s, local club Colne Dynamoes were rapidly progressing through the English non-League system. Colne's benefactor and chairman-manager, Graham White, had a proposal for a groundshare rejected by the Burnley board, and also made an unsuccessful attempt to buy the club in 1989.

== Records ==
Turf Moor has been Burnley's home ground since 1883. This unbroken service makes it the second-longest continuously used stadium in English professional football, behind Preston North End's Deepdale. Burnley are one of the best supported sides in English football per capita, with average attendances of around 21,000 in the Premier League in a town of approximately 78,000 inhabitants.

The highest attendance recorded at Turf Moor is 54,775 for a match against Huddersfield Town in the FA Cup third round on 23 February 1924. During an FA Cup fifth-round replay against Bradford City in 1960, the official attendance was recorded as 52,850. However, some of the gates were broken down, allowing a large number of uncounted fans to enter the ground. The highest attendance at a league match is 52,869 against Blackpool on 11 October 1947, during the 1947–48 First Division season, which also saw Burnley record their highest seasonal average attendance of 33,621.

== Transport ==
Turf Moor is approximately 0.5 miles (0.8 km) east of Burnley's town centre. The ground sits adjacent to the A671 and A6114 roads, and near to the M65 motorway. As most of the stadium's surrounding streets have parking restrictions on matchday, away supporters are advised to park at the cricket club or to use the car parks in the area. The closest railway station to the ground is Burnley Manchester Road, which is a 15-minute walk from Turf Moor. The other railway station is Burnley Central, which is a 20-minute walk away and is mainly served by local trains. The Burnley bus station is relatively close to the ground; a bus ride to Turf Moor takes about five minutes.
