= Barrie Stimpson =

English footballer and manager

Personal information
- Full name: Barrie George Stimpson
- Date of birth: 8 February 1964 (age 62)
- Place of birth: Billingham, England
- Position: Full-back

Youth career
- ????–1980: Hartlepool United

Senior career*
Years	Team	Apps	(Gls)
1980–1983	Hartlepool United	68	(2)
1983–1984	Chesterfield	28	(0)
1984–1985	Hartlepool United	18	(0)
1985–????	Gateshead		
??????	Morecambe		
????–1990	Colne Dynamoes		
1990–????	Barrow		
????–1995	Lancaster City		
1995–????	Barrow		
1995	Morecambe		
1995–????	Lancaster City		

Managerial career
- 2006–2009: Lancaster City
- 2009–2010: Garstang
- * Club domestic league appearances and goals

Barrie George Stimpson (born 8 February 1964) is an English former professional footballer and non-league manager. He played as a full-back, including Football League appearances for both Hartlepool United and Chesterfield.

== Playing career ==
Born in Billingham, Stimpson was an apprentice with Hartlepool United, making his debut in March 1981, a 1–0 win at home to Stockport County. He played in the next three games, an away defeat against Crewe Alexandra and wins at home to Halifax Town and Darlington before losing his place, though played more regularly during the following two seasons. He left to join Chesterfield in the 1983–84 season, but returned to Hartlepool in December 1984 after playing 28 times. On leaving Hartlepool he played for Gateshead, Morecambe and Colne Dynamoes before joining Barrow in August 1990.

He moved to Lancaster City where he was captain under manager Alan Tinsley, before rejoining Barrow in February 1995 after initially being on loan. he had a spell at Morecambe before rejoining Lancaster City in December 1995.

== Managerial career ==
In February 2003 Stimpson was assistant manager of Lancaster City, under manager Tony Hesketh. When Hesketh left to manage Kendal Town, Stimpson followed him, again as assistant manager. Stimpson, along with former player-manager Peter Smith took over as caretaker of Kendal after Hesketh left the club in November 2006, but left after just one game in charge.

Stimpson returned to Lancaster City later in November 2006, this time as manager of a side marooned at the foot of the Conference North after going through serious financial problems. Despite having nine points when Stimpson took over, they finished the season with just one point following a ten-point deduction, over 40 points adrift at the foot of the table.

He left Lancaster by mutual consent in March 2009 after a poor run of form and further economic constraints. In May 2009 he took over as manager of Garstang. He left the club two games into the 2010–11 season.
