= Lancaster City F.C. =

Association football club in England

Coordinates: 54°3′4″N 2°48′40″W

- Full name: Lancaster City Football Club
- Nicknames: The Dolly Blues, Dollies, The Blues, City, The Town
- Founded: 1911; 115 years ago (as Lancaster Town F.C.)
- Ground: Giant Axe
- Capacity: 3,500 (513 seated)
- Chairman: Andy Baker
- Manager: Jimmy Marshall
- League: Northern Premier League Premier Division
- 2025–26: Northern Premier League Premier Division, 6th of 21
Home colours	Away colours	Third colours

Lancaster City Football Club is an English semi-professional non-League football club based in the northern city of Lancaster, Lancashire. They currently compete in the Northern Premier League Premier Division, the seventh tier of English football, and play at Giant Axe. They are full members of the Lancashire County Football Association.

== History ==
Two Lancaster-based clubs, Skerton F.C. (1897–1900) and Lancaster Athletic F.C. (1905–11), had competed in the Lancashire Combination but both clubs folded without completing their final season's fixtures, with Lancaster Athletic playing their final season in the West Lancashire Football League. The present club was then founded in the spring of 1911 as Lancaster Town F.C. and were admitted to Division Two of the Lancashire Combination for the start of the 1911–12 season having proved to the league and the Lancashire FA that they had no connection with the previous two clubs.

After World War I, the Combination was reduced to one division. The club finished as runners-up in 1919–20, and the following season the club made an unsuccessful bid to join the Third Division North of the Football League. Lancaster won the Combination for the first time in 1921–22 and in 1928–29 reached the first round of the FA Cup for the first time losing 3–1 at home to Lincoln City. The following year they again won the Combination whilst the first round was again reached in 1929–30, 1930–31, 1931–32 and 1933–34, losing on each occasion. Back to back league titles were won in 1934–35 and 1935–36, and in 1937, the club adopted its current name, Lancaster City F.C., after the town was awarded city status as part of King George VI's coronation celebrations.

The club continued in the Combination with varying degrees of success including an FA Cup second round appearance, losing to Gateshead, in 1947-48 and a Lancashire FA Challenge Trophy final victory in 1951–52, but by 1970, it was decided that a change was needed so for the 1970–71 season the club left the Combination to join the recently formed Northern Premier League. City again reached the second round of the FA Cup in 1972–73, losing 2–1 at Notts County and won the Lancashire FA Challenge Trophy for a sixth time in 1974–75, but after finishing seventeenth in 1981–82 the club resigned from the league and dropped into the North West Counties League when financial difficulties forced them to fold and reform. A first ever relegation followed three years later, yet despite only finishing thirteenth in 1986–87, City were accepted into the newly formed Division One of the Northern Premier League thanks to in no small part to ground standard and support.

In 1994–95, after several years of consolidation, and now managed by former Preston North End and Bury player Alan Tinsley, Lancaster won the Northern Premier League Presidents Cup, a first trophy in twenty years, and the following season were promoted to the Premier division as champions of Division One, also winning the Division One League Challenge Cup to complete a League and cup double. Two consecutive Northern Premier League Challenge Cup wins followed in 1999–2000 and 2000–01 under Tony Hesketh and after finishing eighth in 2003–04 the club were placed in the newly established Conference North. This was a hugely successful period for Lancaster with the club enjoying healthy league positions and several cup successes as well as reaching the FA Cup first round proper on four occasions. More financial problems led to the club folding at the end of the 2006–07 season though, suffering a 10-point deduction for going into administration and finishing bottom of the league with one point. During the summer, the club reformed and were accepted back into Division One of the Northern Premier League.

2008–09 was the final season for ex-player Barrie Stimpson, who was replaced as manager by the returning Hesketh. Lancaster lost the 2009–10 play-off final 1–0 at home to Colwyn Bay and despite another Presidents Cup Final triumph in 2011, Hesketh could not guide the club to promotion, eventually leaving in September 2012 to be replaced by ex Sunderland player Neil Wainwright. Wainwright left in February 2013 and was, in turn, replaced by former Newcastle United defender Darren Peacock, who brought in former West Ham United winger Trevor Sinclair as his assistant. Both Peacock and Sinclair left the club in September 2015, and City appointed ex player Phil Brown as manager. He led the team to a top six finish and a narrow penalties defeat in the Lancashire FA Challenge Trophy final to Chorley. Brown then took City to the 2016–17 Northern Premier League Division One league title. After a bright start to the 2017–18 season, the team then struggled, finishing eighteenth, and Brown left City early in the 2018–19 season. Former Nelson and Ramsbottom United manager Mark Fell was brought in as his replacement in October 2018. With assistant manager Graham Lancashire, he guided Lancaster to safety. The COVID-19 pandemic meant both the 2019–20 and the 2020-21 league seasons were abandoned with City challenging at the higher end of the league table in both campaigns.

City got the 2021–22 season underway by winning their first silverware in four years lifting the 2019-20 Lancashire FA Challenge Trophy for the first time since 1975, beating Prestwich Heys 6–1 at the County Ground, Leyland, in a rearranged final that was played over a year late due to the COVID-19 pandemic.

After Fell left the club in late 2023, experienced non-league manager Chris Wilcock took over the reins; however, after a year at the helm, he in turn was replaced in April 2025, this time by Kendal Town manager Jimmy Marshall. Marshall guided the club away from the relegation zone, before leading them to a top six finish in 2025-26, just one point and one position off a play-offs place, as well as to victory in the Lancashire FA Challenge Trophy with victory over Padiham at Leyland.

== Stadium ==
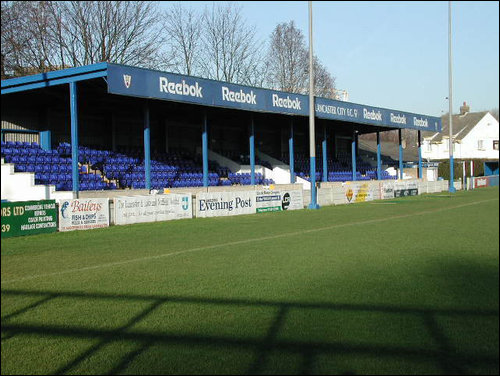
Main Stand at Giant Axe

The club play at Giant Axe. It has been their home ground since the formation of the present club in 1911, although the first club to bear the name Lancaster also played there. Giant Axe was given its name as it was the centrepiece of a sports club, the exterior wall which was, when viewed from above, the same shape as an axe head. In those early years tennis, cricket and bowls were also played at the ground, with the football pitch being at the centre of a huge circle of grass called 'the sixpence', which also featured four cricket pitches. The ground has seen many changes since those early days and was renovated in the 1970s when the original main grandstand and then the social club were both destroyed by fire. A new main stand was built in 1977 and in 1994 a new social club, The Dolly Blue Tavern, was built when the ground was again modernised. The West Road End Terrace was added in 2000 and modern plastic seating installed in the main stand.

The Giant Axe layout consists of the 513-seat Main Stand, named the John Bagguley Stand after the club's late president. There are turnstiles located in three corners of the ground. Next to the main stand are the players and officials changing facilities, a supporters' bar named Netbusters, the directors lounge, toilets and The Dolly's Diner refreshments kiosk. The open West Road Terrace is situated behind one goal and a covered terracing called The Shed, now renamed The Neil Marshall Stand, in memory of City's long-serving captain, at the other. Opposite the Main Stand is the Long Side, an open terrace that also plays host to a second supporters bar, a raised sponsors hospitality lounge and the dugouts. The club offices are now in the club car park behind the West Road Terrace.

Lancaster City's social club The Dolly Blue Tavern, which included the club offices and was built and opened in 1995, was located by the club car park.

The club closed in August 2012 and has since been redeveloped into sheltered accommodation.

== Nickname ==
Lancaster City's official nickname of The Dolly Blues is taken from the dolly blue washing tablets and bags that were manufactured in the early 20th century, the club's team colours being the same colour as the tablets. This is now more often than not abbreviated to The Dollies. Other nicknames adopted by the club are The Blues, City and Town. Town comes from Lancaster's early name of Lancaster Town.

== Reserves, ladies and youth teams ==
Lancaster City also have several other teams starting with Lancaster City Reserves/development squad who play in the Lancashire U23 Football League West Division, winning both the 2011–12 and 2012–13 titles in a league that included several other non-league reserve teams from the North West of England. Lancaster City Juniors and Youth FC teams, ranging from under 7s to under 17s, play in the Lune and District Junior Football League and the Lancaster and Morecambe Service to Youth League. Lancaster City also have ladies team, reforming in time for the start of the 2022–23 season, and were admitted into the Lancashire FA Women's County League, competing in Division One North West, and winning the league and cup double in their first season. The ladies team then went onto to win the Championship Division in 2025-26.

== Club rivalries ==
Lancaster City's oldest rivals have always been neighbours Morecambe; however, since Morecambe's rise through the leagues, few games have been played between the two clubs since the early 1980s. Despite this, the rivalry still continues to be strong amongst fans of City. Rivalries with Accrington Stanley, Barrow and Fleetwood Town are also on hold for the same reason. Over the years, though, Lancaster have built up rivalries, some longstanding, against other clubs from the region with Bamber Bridge, Chorley, Clitheroe, AFC Fylde, Kendal Town, Southport and Workington all providing extra interest whenever the clubs meet.

== Attendances and support ==
Lancaster City's average crowd has declined over the years with the 2012–13 average gate of 171 being its lowest for nearly 30 years. During the 1930s it has been reported that crowds regularly reached 3,000 and by the 1950s gates of 4,500 have been recorded. During the 1960s Lancaster were still attracting around 1,500 for home games, this though dwindled during the 1970s and 1980s and gates dropped to a modest 250. Success on the pitch in the mid-1990s through to the mid-2000 pushed the average gate to a steady 300–400 but this again dropped after the club's demotion of two leagues in 2007. There have though been games when the crowds have soared once again at Giant Axe, especially when neighbours Morecambe have visited for one-off cup matches in recent years, with crowds getting as high as 2,500 for the 1996 FA Cup game. Gates were also up more recently when City entertained well supported clubs such as Chester, FC Halifax Town, Darlington and F.C. United of Manchester. with gates pushing upwards of four figures and, therefore, keeping the average gate at around 250. The FC United of Manchester game alone attracted a gate of over 2,200 in 2007. Lancaster also have a passionate traveling support with the club regularly taking a healthy following on away trips, the highlights being when around 500 fans traveled to Glossop North End in 2017 to see Lancaster win the league, and when over 800 travelled to Leyland to witness City lift the 2025-26 Lancashire FA Challenge Trophy. Since 2021 attendances have steadily been on the rise.

=== Averages ===
Past averages:

- 2025-26: 677
- 2024-25: 511
- 2023-24: 454
- 2022-23: 388
- 2021-22: 310
- 2020-21: 198
- 2019-20: 309
- 2018–19: 242
- 2017–18: 258
- 2016–17: 255
- 2015–16: 219
- 2014–15: 236
- 2013–14: 232
- 2012–13: 171
- 2011–12: 232
- 2010–11: 218
- 2009–10: 240
- 2008–09: 225
- 2007–08: 318
- 2006–07: 253
- 2005–06: 319
- 2004–05: 316
- 2003–04: 334

== Current squad ==
As of 19 August 2026

Note: Flags indicate national team as defined under FIFA eligibility rules; some limited exceptions apply. Players may hold more than one non-FIFA nationality.

No.	Pos.	Nation	Player
—	GK	ENG	Cameron Graham
—	GK	ENG	Brad Kelly
—	DF	ENG	Joe Amison
—	DF	ENG	Sam Bailey (captain)
—	DF	ENG	Tom Bentley-White
—	DF	ENG	James Nolan
—	DF	ENG	Toby Oliver
—	DF	FRA	Sekouba Sanogo
—	DF	ENG	Dylan Thompson
—	MF	ENG	Charlie Bailey

No.	Pos.	Nation	Player
—	MF	ENG	Alfie Cunningham (on loan from Southport )
—	MF	ENG	Nathan Caine
—	MF	ENG	Jim Craig
—	MF	ENG	Dylan Moonan
—	MF	ENG	Matthew Tweedley
—	FW	ENG	James Bailey
—	FW	ENG	Nic Evangelinos
—	FW	ENG	Dom Lawson
—	FW	ENG	Lewis Mansell
—	FW	ENG	Steven Yawson

== Club officials ==
Coaching staff

- Manager: Jimmy Marshall
- Assistant manager: Gavin Clark
- Coach: Lee Marshall
- Goalkeeper coach: Josh Lucas
- Physio: Jack Hatton
- Kitmen: Michael McGahon & Jack Harkin

== Club honours ==
- Northern Premier League Division One North champions: 2016–17
- Northern Premier League Division One champions: 1995–96
- Northern Premier League Challenge Cup winners: 1999–2000, 2000–2001
- Northern Premier League Presidents Cup winners: 1994–95, 2010–11
- Northern Premier League Division One Challenge Cup winners: 1995–96
- Lancashire Combination champions: 1921–22, 1929–30, 1934–35, 1935–36
- Lancashire Combination Challenge Cup winners: 1921–22
- Lancashire FA Challenge Trophy winners: 1927–28, 1928–29, 1930–31, 1934–35, 1951–52, 1974–75, 2019–20, 2025-26

== Club records ==
- Record Attendance - 7,506 v Carlisle United, FA Cup 4th Qualifying round, 17 November 1927
- Record Win - 17-2 v Appleby, FA Cup, 1915
- Record Defeat - 0-10 v Matlock Town, Northern Premier League, 1974
- Most Career Appearances - Edgar J. Parkinson, 531, 1949-1964
- Most Career Goals - Dave Barnes, 143, 1979-1984, 1987-1991
- Most Goals in a Season - 48, Rod Thomas, 1974-75 & Dave Barnes, 1983–84
- Record Transfer Fee Paid - £6000 for Jamie Tandy, July 2006
- Record Transfer Fee Received - £50'000 from NAC Breda for Peter Thomson, 1999
- Best FA Cup performance - 2nd Round, 1946-47 & 1972-73
- Best FA Trophy Performance - 4th Round, 2004-05
- Best FA Vase Performance - 2nd Round, 1986-87 & 1990-91

== Managerial history ==
Permanent managers listed in order from 1966–67:

Name	From	To
Joe Hayes	1966	1968
Barrie Betts	1968	1971
Peter Gilmour	1971	1973
Derek Armstrong	1973	1974
Sean Gallagher	1974	1980
Keith Dyson	1980	1982
Dickie Danson	1982	1991
Russ Perkins	1991	1991
John Smith	1991	1992
Keith Brindle	1992	1992
Alan Tinsley	1992	1996
Gordon Raynor	1996	1998
Alan Tinsley	1998	1999
Tony Hesketh	1999	2003
Phil Wilson	2003	2005
Peter Ward	2005	2006
Gary Finley	2006	2006
Barrie Stimpson	2006	2009
Tony Hesketh	2009	2012
Neil Wainwright	2012	2013
Darren Peacock	2013	2015
Phil Brown	2015	2018
Mark Fell	2018	2023
Chris Willcock	2024	2025
Jimmy Marshall	2025	
