= Dalton United F.C. =

Association football club in England

Dalton United
- Full name: Dalton United Association Football Club
- Founded: 1963
- Ground: Railway Meadow, Dalton-in-Furness
- Chairman: Phill Rigg
- Manager: Andrew Marshall
- League: West Lancashire League Division Two
- 2024–25: West Lancashire League Division Two, 11th of 16
Home colours

Dalton United Association Football Club is a football club based in Dalton-in-Furness in Cumbria, England. They are currently members of the West Lancashire League Division Two and play at Railway Meadow. The club are affiliated with the Lancashire Football Association, and also have two teams playing in the local Furness Premier League. Their colours are red and black striped shirts, black shorts and black socks.

== History ==
Dalton United became members of the West Lancashire League in 1971, playing in the Second Division. In the 1975–76 season they finished as runners-up and were promoted to the First Division. In 1980–81 and 1981–82 seasons the club entered the FA Vase, reaching the first round in the latter season. They were West Lancashire League champions in the 1983–84 season and again the following season. The West Lancashire League was restructured for the 1998–99 season and the First Division was renamed the Premier Division. They were Premier Division runners-up in 1999–2000 season and again the following season.

Of all the current member clubs, only Burnley United have had a longer spell playing in the Premier Division.

In October 2004 Dalton United became the first team to beat AFC Fylde since January 2003, a record that had spanned 21 months. The run finally ended when Dalton beat AFC Fylde 1–0 in a league match.

== Honours ==
- West Lancashire League
  - Runners-up 1999–2000, 2000–01

Division one winners 1983–84, 1984–85 Division two winners 1974–75 Richardson Cup Winners 1982–83, 2008–09 Runners-up 1984–85, 1988–89, 1999–00 Presidents Cup Winners Runners-up 1975–76 Wilson Carradus Trophy winners 2010–11

== Records ==
- FA Vase
  - First Round 1981–82
