= Burnley Belvedere F.C. =

Association football club in England

Burnley Belvedere
- Full name: Burnley Belvedere Football Club
- Nickname: Belvo
- Founded: 1881
- Ground: Holden Road, Burnley
- League: East Lancashire League Premier Division
- 2025–26: Lancashire Amateur League Premier Division, 1st of 12

Burnley Belvedere Football Club is a football club based in Burnley, Lancashire, England. They are currently members of the East Lancashire League Premier Division and play at Holden Road.

== History ==
The club was established in 1881. In 1979–80, the club entered the FA Vase for the first time, going on to enter the competition in each of the next eight seasons. In 1999, they joined Division Two of the West Lancashire League. After winning the division at the first attempt, they were promoted to Division One. The club finished bottom of Division One in 2004–05, resulting in relegation back to Division Two. They left the league at the end of the 2008–09 season.

Burnley Belvedere later joined the East Lancashire League, and were Division One champions in 2016–17. They retained the league title the following season, after which they moved up to the Premier Division of the Lancashire Amateur League. The club managed to win the premier division of Lancashire Amateur League in the 2025-2026 season.

== Honours ==
- West Lancashire League
  - Division Two champions 1999–2000
- East Lancashire League
  - Division One champions 2016–17, 2017–18
- Lancashire Amateur League
  - Premier Division champions 2025-2026

== Records ==
- Best FA Vase performance: First round, 1979–80, 1985–86
