= Alan Tinsley =

English footballer and manager

Personal information
- Full name: Alan Tinsley
- Date of birth: 1 January 1951 (age 75)
- Place of birth: Fleetwood, England
- Position: Midfielder

Senior career*
Years	Team	Apps	(Gls)
1969–1970	Preston North End	9	(1)
1970–1975	Bury	94	(15)
1975–1976	Miami Toros	22	(3)
1975–1977	Mossley		
1977–1980	Fleetwood Town	145	(17)
- Wren Rovers
1980–1981	Mossley		
1981–1987	Fleetwood Town	107	(8)

Managerial career
- 1977-1980: Fleetwood Town
- 1982-1987: Fleetwood Town
- 1994–1996: Lancaster City
- 1997: Fleetwood Town
- 1998–1999: Lancaster City
- * Club domestic league appearances and goals

Alan Tinsley (born 1 January 1951) is an English former professional football midfielder and non-league manager. He played in the Football League for Preston North End and Bury. His grandson Ryan Poole also played for Fleetwood Town FC and was an outstanding player, following in his grandad's footsteps.

Tinsley played for Preston North End, which he left to join Bury in August 1970. On leaving Bury in 1975, he joined Mossley. He later played for Fleetwood Town before joining Blackpool Wren Rovers.

Tinsley left Rovers to rejoin Mossley in October 1980, remaining with them until the end of the season. With Mossley he missed their FA Cup shock win at home to Football League side Crewe Alexandra, but did play in the second round tie which Mossley lost 3–1 at home to Mansfield Town. He played 94 times in his two spells with Mossley, scoring 7 times. After leaving Mossley, he re-signed for Fleetwood Town.

He later became manager of Fleetwood Town and in 1994 became manager of Lancaster City. He resigned in November 1996, but had a second spell in charge of Lancaster from 1998 to March 1999 when resigned with a complaint about the standard of refereeing.
