= Eagley F.C. =

Association football club in England

Coordinates: 53°36′58″N 2°26′03″W

Eagley
- Full name: Eagley Football Club
- Nickname: The Eagles
- Founded: 1952
- Ground: Dunscar Sports Complex, Eagley
- Chairman: Sam Cowen
- Manager: Neil Hart
- League: West Lancashire League Premier Division
- 2025–26: West Lancashire League Premier Division, 1st of 16
- Website: eagleyfc.co.uk
Home colours

Eagley Football Club is a football club based in the village of Eagley, near Bolton in Greater Manchester. They are currently members of the West Lancashire League Premier Division and play at the Dunscar Sports Complex. The club are affiliated to the Lancashire Football Association. The club's colours are yellow shirts and black shorts.

== History ==
The original Eagley FC was formed in 1875. It disbanded before the 1886–87 season. A new club Eagley Mills FC, was formed after the Second World War, which played in the Manchester League and in 1959–60 was the winner of the Lancashire Amateur Shield.

The club declined in the 1970s until 1980 when a group of local enthusiasts stepped in to try to revive Eagley to some of its former glories. In 1981, the club appointed the ex-Walker Institute player Paul Thompson as manager with Peter Conroy as his assistant. This led to a further period of success in the Combination plus a Lancashire Junior Shield Final appearance, losing 3–2 to Latham & Burscough and a 2–1 Hospital Cup Final victory over Little Hulton. A new phase of the club's history was entered into on joining the West Lancashire League for the 1988–89 season. After two seasons settling into the league, the club appointed Terry Finney as team manager. Soon after, the club had success, being promoted to the Premier Division as champions. Finney's success continued over the next eight seasons with the club making appearances in the West Lancashire Presidents and Richardson's Cup finals, along with four Hospital Cup finals, winning two. However, during this period the club suffered a major blow when the clubhouse was completely destroyed by fire in August 1992. The Football and Cricket Clubs joined to build a new clubhouse which is still used today.

From December 2013 to 2014, the club was managed by former Wales and Wigan Athletic striker Simon Haworth.

Following the appointment of Neil Hart as first team manager, the Eagles saw success during the 2023-24 season, achieving promotion from Division One of the West Lancashire League back into the Premier Division. The season was also capped off with victory in the final of the Hospital Cup, defeating CMB 5-1 to lift the trophy. After a year of consolidation, the 2025-26 season saw Eagley win the West Lancashire Premier Division for the first time in 37 years, and reach the final of the Hospital Cup, due to face Walshaw Sports Club.

== Colours ==
The original Eagley club wore white shirts and shorts, with blue socks.

== Honours ==
- West Lancashire League Premier Division
  - Runners-up 2003–04
  - Champions 2025-26
- West Lancashire League Division One
  - Champions 2023–24
- West Lancashire League Division Two
  - Champions 1990–91
- Bolton Hospital Cup
- Champions 2023-24
