= Charnock Richard F.C. =

Association football club in England

Coordinates: 53.6322°N 2.6733°W

Charnock Richard
- Full name: Charnock Richard Football Club
- Nicknames: The Villagers; The Greens
- Founded: 1933 (folded 1948); 1955 (reformed)
- Ground: Mossie Park, Charnock Richard
- Chairman: Shaun Tootell
- Manager: Ryan Donnellan
- League: North West Counties League Premier Division
- 2024–25: North West Counties League Premier Division, 12th of 24
- Website: charnockrichardfc.co.uk
Home colours	Away colours

Charnock Richard Football Club is a football club based in Charnock Richard, near Chorley, Lancashire, England. They are currently members of the North West Counties League Premier Division and play at Mossie Park.

== History ==
The club was originally established in 1933 when a team from the village of Charnock Richard joined the Chorley Alliance League, a Sunday league competition. However, after winning the league in 1947–48, the club folded after attempting to run two teams during the following season. The club was reformed in 1955 and rejoined the Chorley Alliance League, winning the title in 1956–57, before switching to the Preston & District League. They won the league in 1960–61 and went on to win three successive league titles between 1966–67 and 1968–69. They won their final Preston & District League title in 1989–90, and also spent some time in the Bolton Combination.

In 1993 the club moved up to Division Two of the West Lancashire League. They were runners-up in 1994–95, earning promotion to Division One. After finishing as Division One runners-up in 1996–97, they won the division in 1997–98. The division was renamed the Premier Division in 1998, and they were runners-up again in 1998–99 and 2001–02, before winning the title in 2002–03. After finishing as runners-up in 2005–06, the club won the Premier Division and Wilf Carr Memorial Cup in 2008–09, and went on to win four consecutive Premier Division titles between 2011–12 and 2014–15. A second-place finish in 2015–16 saw the club promoted to Division One of the North West Counties League. In their first season in Division One they were runners-up, earning promotion to the Premier Division. In 2021–22 the club won the league's Challenge Cup, beating Cammell Laird 5–0 in the final.

In 2023–24 Charnock Richard finished fourth in the Premier Division, qualifying for the promotion play-offs. They subsequently lost 1–0 to Bury in the semifinals. The club won the Challenge Cup for a second time in 2024–25, beating Stafford Town 6–2 in the final.

=== Season-by-season record ===
Season	Division	Position	FA Cup	FA Trophy	FA Vase	Significant events
1993–94	West Lancashire League Division Two	4/17	–	–	–	
1994–95	West Lancashire League Division Two	2/17	–	–	–	Promoted
1995–96	West Lancashire League Division One	5/17	–	–	–	
1996–97	West Lancashire League Division One	2/18	–	–	–	
1997–98	West Lancashire League Division One	1/18	–	–	–	
1998–99	West Lancashire League Premier Division	2/16	–	–	–	Division renamed
1999–00	West Lancashire League Premier Division	4/16	–	–	–	
2000–01	West Lancashire League Premier Division	7/15	–	–	–	
2001–02	West Lancashire League Premier Division	2/16	–	–	–	
2002–03	West Lancashire League Premier Division	1/16	–	–	–	
2003–04	West Lancashire League Premier Division	6/16	–	–	–	
2004–05	West Lancashire League Premier Division	4/16	–	–	–	
2005–06	West Lancashire League Premier Division	2/16	–	–	–	
2006–07	West Lancashire League Premier Division	5/16	–	–	–	
2007–08	West Lancashire League Premier Division	3/16	–	–	–	
2008–09	West Lancashire League Premier Division	1/16	–	–	–	
2009–10	West Lancashire League Premier Division	4/17	–	–	–	
2010–11	West Lancashire League Premier Division	2/16	–	–	–	
2011–12	West Lancashire League Premier Division	1/16	–	–	–	
2012–13	West Lancashire League Premier Division	1/16	–	–	–	
2013–14	West Lancashire League Premier Division	1/16	–	–	–	
2014–15	West Lancashire League Premier Division	1/15	–	–	–	
2015–16	West Lancashire League Premier Division	2/16	–	–	–	Promoted
2016–17	North West Counties League Division One	2/22	–	–	R2	Promoted
2017–18	North West Counties League Premier Division	6/23	EP	–	R1	
2018–19	North West Counties League Premier Division	6/20	P	–	R1	
2019–20	North West Counties League Premier Division	–	Q1	–	R1	Season abandoned due to COVID-19 pandemic
2020–21	North West Counties League Premier Division	–	Q1	–	R2	Season abandoned due to COVID-19 pandemic
2021–22	North West Counties League Premier Division	4/21	Q1	–	Q1	
2022–23	North West Counties League Premier Division	11/22	Q1	–	R1	
2023–24	North West Counties League Premier Division	4/24	Q1	–	R4	Lost Playoff Semi-Final
2024–25	North West Counties League Premier Division	12/24	P	–	R2	
Source: Football Club History Database

== Ground ==
The club started playing at Mossie Close in 1968, later moving to Mossie Park on the other side of the road. The ground has a 100-seat stand.

== Non-playing staff ==
=== Corporate hierarchy ===
Position	Name	Source
Chairman	Shaun Tootell	
Vice-Chairman	Geoff Haslam	
Secretary	David Rowland	
Assistant Secretary	Graham Randle	
Treasurer	Steve Mawdesley	
Programme Editor/Social Media	Etienne Jones	
Commercial Manager	Josh Vosper	
Hospitality Manager	Jim Bibby	
Club Photographer	Steven Taylor	
Groundsman	Ryan Donnellan	
Kit Manager	Dave Smith	

=== Management hierarchy ===
Position	Name	Source
Manager	Ryan Donnellan	
Assistant Manager	Danny Nolan	
Coaches	Craig Worthington	
Coaches	Jack Bennett	
Coaches	Lewis Spensley	
Goalkeeper Coach	Gareth Jones	
Physio	Julia Rose-Bryce	
Reserve Team Manager	Paul Billington	
Reserve Team Coach	Joe Singleton	

== Honours ==
- North West Counties League
  - Challenge Cup winners 2021–22, 2024–25
- West Lancashire League
  - Premier Division champions 2002–03, 2008–09, 2011–12, 2012–13, 2013–14, 2014–15
  - Division One champions 1997–98
  - Richardson Cup winners 2001–02, 2003–04, 2013–14, 2014–15, 2015–16
  - Wilf Carr Memorial Cup winners 2008–09
- Preston & District League
  - Premier Division champions 1960–61, 1966–67, 1967–68, 1968–69, 1989–90
  - Guildhall Cup winners 1957–58, 1963–64, 1968–69, 1992–93
- Chorley Alliance League
  - Champions 1947–48, 1956–57
- Lancashire Amateur Shield
  - Winners 1967–68, 2001–02, 2006–07, 2010–11, 2011–12
- Goldline Trophy
  - Winners 2000–01, 2005–06

== Records ==
- Best FA Cup performance: First qualifying round, 2019–20, 2020–21, 2021–22, 2022–23, 2023–24
- Best FA Vase performance: Fourth round, 2023–24
- Record attendance: 979 vs Bury, FA Cup preliminary round, 19 August 2023

== See also ==
- Charnock Richard F.C. players
