= Old Boltonians A.F.C. =

English association football club

Old Boltonians
- crest
- Full name: Old Boltonians Association Football Club
- Founded: 1920; 106 years ago
- Ground: Turton Football Ground
- Coordinates: 53.6383°N 2.4019°W
- League: Lancashire Amateur League; Premier Division
- Website: https://www.oldbolts.co.uk/
Home colours	Away colours

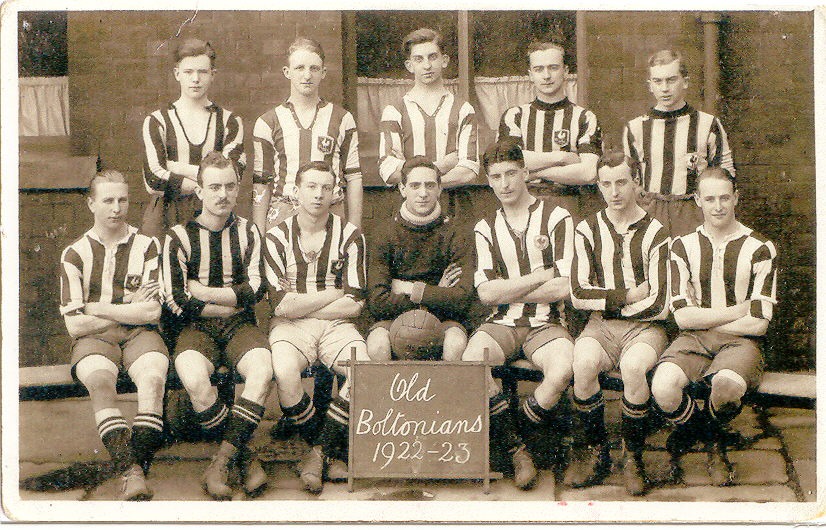
Old Boltonians in 1922–23

Old Boltonians Association Football Club are a football club based in Chapeltown, England. Their ground may be the oldest in the world still in use today.

Old Boltonians were founded in 1920 for former members of Bolton School. As of 2023–24, they play the Premier Division of the Lancashire Amateur League.

Old Boltonians play in black and white striped shirts, black shorts and black socks with white band at top; their second kit is maroon shirts, white shorts and maroon socks.

== Ground ==
Old Boltonians play their home games at Turton Football Ground, on Tower Street in Chapeltown. In the 2020 book British Football's Greatest Grounds by Mike Bayly, Turton was voted one of the top grounds to visit in the country. Bayly writes:

Research by sports historian Dr Peter Swain has proposed football - or antecedants of - had been played here since the 1830s.

Indeed, Turton may be the oldest football ground in the world still in use today, having hosted a match between Tottington and Darwen in 1830. The ground was later home to Turton F.C., founded in 1871 and instrumental in bringing the rules of association football from London to the North West.

Old Boltonians have played at Turton since 1952. In 1970, they bought the land on Tower Street, and in 2012 built its pavilion.
