= Lancashire Amateur League =

Association football league in England

- Founded: 1899
- Country: England
- Divisions: 6
- Number of clubs: 59: Premier Division: 12; Division One: 12; Division Two: 11; Division Three: 13; Division Four: 11; Division Five:
- Website: http://www.lancsam.co.uk/

The Lancashire Amateur Football League is an English association football league founded in 1899. Currently the league consists of five divisions – Premier, One, Two, Three and Four.

The top two teams from each division are promoted to the next division up and the bottom two teams are relegated to the next division down. Two teams from the same club are not permitted to compete in the same division.

== History ==
The Lancashire Amateur Football League (more commonly known as the LAL) was founded in 1899. Clubs are situated throughout the traditional boundaries of Lancashire and Cheshire; stretching from Preston in the north, Southport in the west, Rochdale and Oldham in the east and Lymm in the south.

The Executive Committee and League Council are elected by clubs in membership of the League. Although clubs running a minimum of two teams are preferred, the League will consider applications for clubs running one team provided they match the League's standards expected for discipline, ground and facilities, fair play and standards of organisation/administration. The League has a strict policy of monitoring the discipline record of players (using a points system) and players whose conduct has not been considered acceptable are subject to their registration being withdrawn.

Member club Old Boltonians play on what has been recognised as the oldest football ground still in use in the world.

== Current members ==
=== Premier Division ===
Club	Home ground
Ashtonians	Byrchall High School
Bolton Wyresdale	The Castle Hill Centre
Burnley Belvedere	Holden Road
Chaddertonians	Hopwood Hall College
Old Blackburnians AFC	Harrison Playing Fields
Old Boltonians A.F.C.	Tower Street
Old Mancunians	Manchester University Sports Ground
Radcliffe Town AFC	King George V Playing Fields
Roach Dynamos Open Age	Darnhill Playing Fields
Rochdale St. Clements	Burton Park
Whitworth Valley	Rawstron Street
Winstanley St Aidans	The Convent

=== Division One ===
Club	Home ground
Accrington Amateurs	Stanley Sports Hub
AFC Wigan	Scot Lane Playing Fields
Ashtonians Reserves	Byrchall High School
Burnley United	Barden Sports Arena
Bury G.S.O.B.	Buckley Wells
Chaddertonians	Hopwood Hall College
Crompton FC Academy Crompton FC OA	ESSA Academy
Howe Bridge Mills	Howe Bridge Leisure Centre
Milltown FC	Hopwood Hall College
Old Mancunians Reserves	Manchester University Sports Ground
Radcliffe Boys	Hollinhurst Playing Fields
Wardle	Rutherford Park

=== Division Two ===
Club	Home ground
Bury G.S.O.B. Reserves	Buckley Wells
Breightmet United	Moss Park Bury Road Bolton BL2 6NX
Old Blackburnians AFC Reserves	Harrison Playing Fields
Old Boltonians AFC Reserves	Tower Street
Old Rivingtonians	Green Lane
Oldham Hulmeians AFC	Kingsway Park High School
Radcliffe Town AFC Reserves	King George V Playing Fields
Rochdale St. Clements Reserves	Burton Park
Rossendale Athletic FC	Stacksteads Recreation Ground
Rossendale FC	Marl Pits Sports Complex
Whitworth Valley Reserves	Rawstron Street

=== Division Three ===
Club	Home ground
Ainsworth FC	Ainsworth Hall
Bolton Wyresdale Reserves	The Castle Hill Centre
Breightmet United FC Reserves	Moss Park Bury Road Bolton BL2 6NX
Chaddertonians 'A'	Hopwood Hall College
Crompton FC Academy	Canon Slade School
Hesketh Casuals	Preston New Road Recreation Ground
Howe Bridge Mills Reserves	Howe Bridge Leisure Centre
Lymm AFC	Sandy Lane
Old Mancunians 'A'	Manchester University Sports Ground
Old Rivingtonians Reserves	Green Lane
Radcliffe Boys Reserves	Hollinhurst Playing Fields
Tyldesley FC	St Mary's Catholic High School
Wardle Second	Rutherford Park

=== Division Four ===
Club	Home ground
AFC Wigan Reserves	Scot Lane Playing Fields
Bury G.S.O.B. 'A'	Buckley Wells
Halshaw Moor Reserves	Kearsley Academy
Lymm AFC Reserves	Sandy Lane
Milltown FC Reserves	Hopwood Hall College
Moses Gate FC	Little Lever School & Sports Centre
Old Mancunians 'B'	Manchester University Sports Ground
Oldham Hulmeians AFC Reserves	Kingsway Park High School
Prestwich	Hopwood Hall College
Radcliffe Town AFC 'A'	King George V Playing Fields
Rossendale Athletic FC	Stacksteads Recreation Ground

== Lancashire Amateur League winners ==
=== 2003–2004 ===
Season	Premier	One	Two	Res Prem	Res One	Res Two	Three 'A'
2003–04	Gregorians Reserves	Old Mancunians	Gregorians Reserves	Old Boltonians Reserves	Bolton Wyresdale Reserves	Bury Amateurs	Old Blackburnians 'A'

=== 2004–10 ===
Season	Premier	One	Two	Three	Four	Five	Six	Seven
2004–05	Prairie United	Walshaw SC	Chaddertonians Reserves	Walshaw SC Reserves	Fairfield Reserves	Gregorians 'A'	Old Blackburnians 'A'	Accrington Loyal Amateurs 'B'
2005–06	Little Lever Sports Club	Hindley Juniors	Spotland Methodists	Old Blackburnians Reserves	Hesketh Casuals Reserves	Radcliffe Boys Reserves	Rochdale St Clements 'B'	Rossendale Amateurs 'B'
2006–07	Rochdale St Clements	Old Blackburnians	Failsworth Dynamos	Rochdale St Clements 'A'	Bury Amateurs Reserves	Rossendale Amateurs 'A'	Bury Amateurs 'A'	Mostonians 'B'
2007–08	Rossendale Amateurs	Failsworth Dynamos	Howe Bridge Mills	Hesketh Casuals Reserves	Mostonians Reserves	Bury Amateurs 'A'	Rossendale Amateurs 'B'	Lymm 'B'
2008–09	Old Blackburnians	Howe Bridge Mills	Rossendale FC Reserves	Mostonians Reserves	Castle Hill Reserves	Radcliffe Boys Reserves	Lymm 'B'	Chaddertonians 'B'
2009–10	Little Lever Sports Club	Horwich St Mary's Victoria	Prestwich	Roach Dynamos	Chaddertonians 'A'	Hesketh Casuals 'A'	Prestwich Reserves	Broughton Amateurs 'B'

=== 2010–11 ===
Season	Premier	One	Two	Three	Four	Five	Six (N)	Six
2010–11	Failsworth Dynamos	Prestwich	Rochdale St Clements Reserves	North Walkden	Old Boltonians 'A'	Prestwich Reserves	Rossendale Amateurs 'C'	Ashtonians Reserves

=== 2011–14 ===
Season	Premier	One	Two	Three	Four	Five	Six	Seven
2011–12	Castle Hill	Hindley Juniors	North Walkden	Tottington United	Prestwich Reserves	Rossendale Amateurs 'C'	Thornleigh 'A'	Horwich Victoria 'A'
2012–13	Prestwich	Tottington United	Oldham Hulmeians	Failsworth Dynamos Reserves	Mostonians Reserves	Thornleigh Reserves	Thornleigh 'A'	Howe Bridge Mills 'A'
2013–14	Prestwich	North Walkden	Oldham Hulmeians Reserves	Old Boltonians 'A'	AFC Dobbies	Radcliffe St Mary's Reserves	Oldham Hulmeians 'A'	Radcliffe Boys Reserves

=== 2014–17 ===
Season	Premier	One	Two	Three	Four	Five	Six
2014–15	Old Boltonians	Tyldesley United	Whitworth Valley	Hesketh Casuals Reserves	Accrington Amateurs Reserves	Mostonians 'A'	Whitworth Valley Reserves
2015–16	Failsworth Dynamos	Oldham Hulmeians	Thornleigh	Accrington Amateurs Reserves	Horwich St Mary's Victoria Reserves	Thornleigh 'A'	Howe Bridge Mills 'A'
2016–17	Failsworth Dynamos	Roach Dynamos	AFC Dobbies	Horwich St Mary's Victoria Reserves	Old Blackburnians 'A'	Howe Bridge Mills 'A'	Radcliffe Boys Reserves

=== 2017–23 ===
Season	Premier	One	Two	Three	Four	Five
2017–18	Mostonians	Whitworth Valley	Chaddertonians	Oldham Hulmeians	Whitworth Valley Reserves	Horwich RMI Reserves
2018–19	Whitworth Valley	Bolton Wyresdale	Little Lever Sports Club (Seniors) Reserves	Bolton Wyresdale Reserves	Old Boltonians A.F.C. 'A'	Old Mancunians 'A'
2019–20	Void	Void	Void	Void	Void	Void
2020–21	Void	Void	Void	Void	Void	Void
2021–22	Little Lever Sports Club (Seniors)	Radcliffe Town AFC	Blackburn Eagles JFC Saturday	Radcliffe Boys	Oldham Hulmeians AFC Reserves	Radcliffe Boys Reserves
2022–23	Chaddertonians	Mill Hill (Blackburn)	Radcliffe Boys	Oldham Hulmeians AFC	Crompton FC Academy Reserves	Old Rivingtonians Reserves

=== Premier Division league titles by club ===
Club	Winners	Winning seasons
Failsworth Dynamos	3	2010–11, 2015–16, 2016–17
Prestwich	2	2012–13, 2013–14
Little Lever Sports Club	2	2005–06, 2009–10
Chaddertonians	1	2022–23
Little Lever Sports Club (Seniors)	1	2021–22
Whitworth Valley	1	2018–19
Mostonians	1	2017–18
Old Boltonians	1	2014–15
Castle Hill	1	2011–12
Old Blackburnians	1	2008–09
Rossendale Amateurs	1	2007–08
Rochdale St Clements	1	2006–07
Prairie United	1	2004–05
Gregorians Reserves	1	2003–04
