= Blackpool Wren Rovers F.C. =

Association football club in England

Blackpool Wren Rovers
- Full name: Blackpool Wren Rovers Football Club
- Nickname: Wrens
- Founded: 1931 (as Wren Rovers)
- Ground: Brews Park, School Road
- Capacity: 4,000
- Chairman: Oliver Perkins & Mark Watkins
- Manager: Henry Wright & Ste McEwan
- League: West Lancashire League Premier Division
- 2025–26: West Lancashire League Premier Division, 3rd of 16
- Website: http://www.blackpoolrovers.co.uk
Home colours	Away colours

Blackpool Wren Rovers Football Club is a football club based in Blackpool, Lancashire, England. They are currently members of the West Lancashire League Premier Division and play at Brews Park, which is located on School Road; the ground adjoins the ground of Squires Gate, and is also very close to the ground of AFC Blackpool. They are currently managed by Henry Wright & Ste McEwan.

Blackpool Wren Rovers are members of the Lancashire Football Association. The club's colours are red shirts, red shorts and red socks.

== History ==
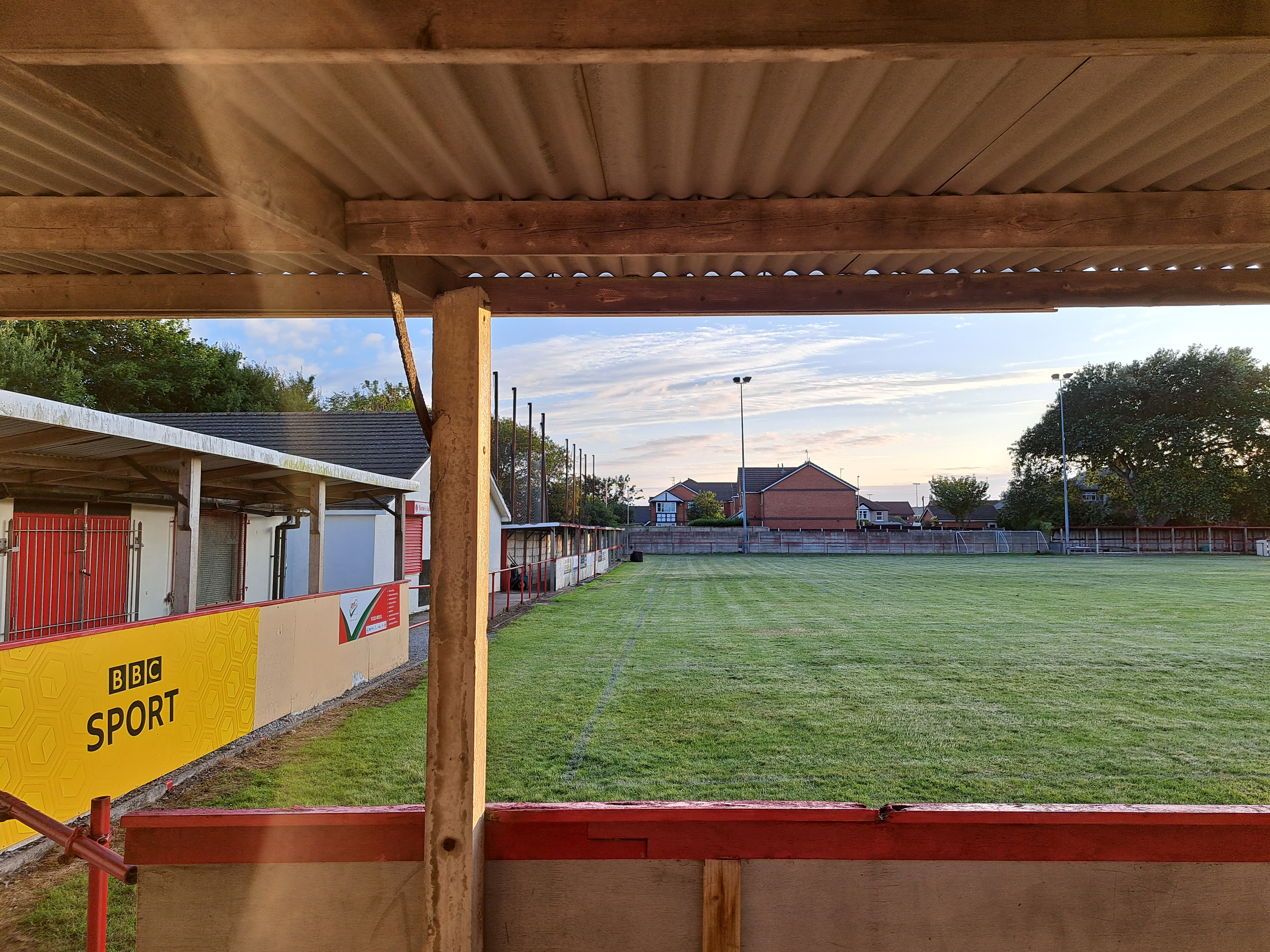
Brews Park pictured from the neighbouring Brian Addison Stadium

The club were formed in 1931 and were originally known as Wren Rovers. They changed the club name to Blackpool Rovers in 1990, before adopting their present name in 1998. They were founder members of the re-formed West Lancashire League in 1959, and subsequently played in the Lancashire Combination and the North West Counties League. They entered the FA Cup regularly between 1983–84 and 1990–91. Financial considerations necessitated that they dropped down the football pyramid, and they returned to the West Lancashire League.

The club also operates a women's football club, Fleetwood Town Wrens Women's.

== Honours ==
- North West Counties League Division Two
  - Runners-up 1990–91
- Lancashire Combination
  - Champions 1978–79, 1980–81
  - Runners-up 1977–78
- West Lancashire League Premier Division
  - Champions 2009–10, 2010–11, 2015–16
  - Runners-up 2007–08, 2008–09, 2011–12, 2012–13, 2013–14, 2014–15, 2016–17, 2017–18
- West Lancashire League Division One
  - Champions 2000–01
  - Runners-up 2004–05
  - Champions Reserves 2024-25
- West Lancashire League Division Two
  - Champions 1998–99

== Records ==
- Best FA Cup performance: Second qualifying round, 1984–85, 1986-87
- Best FA Vase performance: Fourth round, 1987-88
