= West Lancashire Football League =

Association football league in England

- Founded: 1904
- Country: England
- Divisions: Premier Division; Division One; Division Two
- Number of clubs: 43
- Level on pyramid: Level 11 (Premier Division)
- Feeder to: North West Counties League; Division One North
- Domestic cup(s): Richardson Cup; Presidents Cup; Challenge Cup
- Current champions: Thornton Cleveleys (Premier Division); Eagley (Division One); Astley and Buckshaw (Division Two) (2023–24)
- Website: Official website

The West Lancashire Football League is a football competition based in northern England, consisting of five divisions – three for first teams (Premier, One and Two), and two for reserve teams. The top division, the Premier Division, sits at step seven of the National League System and is a feeder league for the North West Counties Football League, although promotion and relegation is based upon application to the National League System Panel.

== History ==
The league was formed in 1904, although 1905–06 was the first season. It was originally known as the Preston & District Combination, with member clubs having to be within ten miles of Preston. It became the West Lancashire League in 1908, and over the years the qualification area was gradually extended. At first it was a competition for minor non-league football clubs, but from the 1920s the membership changed with the league including several Football League club's 'A' teams. This continued through to the early 1950s. However, the creation of the Lancashire League meant that some of the Football League clubs changed their allegiance. The West Lancashire League struggled along for a few years, until 1954 when it was closed down.

The league was re-established in 1959, with a small membership of clubs from the Blackpool area. Steadily the league grew, and in 1964–65 it expanded to two divisions. The league had a rapidly changing membership, but continued to prosper, with a third senior division being formed for the 1998–99 season. The league now covers the whole of modern Lancashire, plus areas of Cumbria, Greater Manchester, Merseyside, and even West Yorkshire. A fourth division operated for two seasons between 2016 and 2018.

In past seasons the league has included former Football League club Nelson and the forerunners of former Football League side Morecambe.

== Current members (2026-27) ==
The constitution for season 2026-27 is as follows:

=== Premier Division ===
- Astley & Buckshaw United
- Blackpool Wren Rovers
- Burscough Richmond
- CMB Sports
- Cleator Moor Celtic
- Eagley
- Haslingden St Mary's
- Hesketh Bank
- Hurst Green
- Kendal County
- Lostock St. Gerards
- Millom
- Milnthorpe Corinthians
- Poulton
- Rossendale
- Tempest United

=== Division One ===
- Askam United
- Carnforth Rangers
- Chipping
- Coppull United
- Crooklands Casuals
- Croston Sports
- Freckleton
- Fulwood Amateurs Reserves
- Holker Old Boys Reserves
- Lytham Town
- Pause United
- Slyne with Hest
- Stoneclough
- Turton
- Ulverston Rangers
- Whitehaven

=== Division Two ===
- Appley Bridge
- Bamber Bridge Reserves
- Caton United
- Charnock Richard Reserves
- Dalton United
- Euxton Villa Reserves
- Galgate
- Garstang Reserves
- Hawcoat Park
- Langho
- Mill Hill
- Standish St. Wilfrid's
- Storeys of Lancaster
- Thornton Cleveleys Reserves
- Trawden Celtic
- Walney Island

== West Lancashire League Champions ==
Season	(as Preston & District Combination)		
1905–06	Coppull Central		
1906–07	Great Harwood		
1907–08	Southport Park Villa		
Season	(as West Lancashire League)		
1908–09	Leyland		
1909–10	Longridge		
1910–11	Horwich RMI		
1911–12	Higher Walton Albion		
1912–13	Hamilton Central		
1913–14	Horwich RMI		
1914–15	Leyland		
1919–20	Leyland		
1920–21	Leyland Motors		
1921–22	Croston		
1922–23	Accrington Stanley Reserves		
1923–24	Croston		
1924–25	Fleetwood Reserves		
1925–26	Lancaster Town Reserves		
1926–27	Breightmet United		
1927–28	Burnley 'A'		
1928–29	Lancaster Town Reserves		
1929–30	Chorley Reserves		
1930–31	Bolton Wanderers 'A'		
1931–32	Westhoughton		
1932–33	Chorley Reserves		
1933–34	Calderstones		
1934–35	Whittingham CMH		
1935–36	Bolton Wanderers 'A'		
1936–37	Whittingham CMH		
1937–38	Bolton Wanderers 'A'		
1938–39	Burnley 'A'		
1946–47	Blackpool 'A'		
1947–48	Morecambe Reserves		
1948–49	Blackpool 'A'		
1949–50	Burnley 'A'		
1950–51	Blackburn Rovers 'A'		
1951–52	Blackburn Rovers 'A'		
1952–53	Blackburn Rovers 'A'		
1953–54	Preston North End 'A'		
1959–60	Fleetwood Reserves		
1960–61	Blackpool Mechanics		
1961–62	Blackpool Mechanics		
1962–63	Vickers Sports		
1963–64	Lancashire Constabulary		
Season	Division One	Division Two	
1964–65	Lancashire Constabulary	Heyhouses	
1965–66	Vickers Sports	Layton Institute Reserves	
1966–67	Layton Institute	Lytham St. Annes YMCA	
1967–68	Penwortham Hill Rovers	Norcross & Warbreck	
1968–69	Great Harwood Reserves	Longridge United	
1969–70	Wren Rovers	Wigan Technical College	
1970–71	Wren Rovers	Colne Dynamoes	
1971–72	Colne Dynamoes	Padiham	
1972–73	Colne Dynamoes	Trimpell	
1973–74	Colne Dynamoes	Colne British Legion	
1974–75	Colne Dynamoes	Corinthians	
1975–76	Springfields	Dalton United	
1976–77	Blackpool Rangers	Padiham	
1977–78	Springfields	Harwood Wellington	
1978–79	Blackpool Rangers	Penwortham Hill Rovers	
1979–80	Freckleton	Squires Gate	
1980–81	Freckleton	Haslingden	
1981–82	Freckleton	Barnoldswick Park Rovers	
1982–83	Blackpool Rangers	ICI Thornton	
1983–84	Dalton United	Colne Dynamoes Reserves	
1984–85	Dalton United	Anchor Cables	
1985–86	BAC Preston	Kirkham Town	
1986–87	Holker Old Boys	Royal Ordnance	
1987–88	BAC Preston	Turton	
1988–89	BAC Preston	Wyre Villa	
1989–90	Colne Dynamoes Reserves	Burnley Bank Hall	
1990–91	BAC Preston	Eagley	
1991–92	Burnley Bank Hall	ICI Thornton	
1992–93	Vickers Sports Club	Leyland DAF	
1993–94	Burnley United	Lancashire Constabulary	
1994–95	Fulwood Amateurs	Wyre Villa	
1995–96	Springfields	Lansil	
1996–97	Wyre Villa	Fleetwood Hesketh	
1997–98	Charnock Richard	Vickers Sports Club	
Season	Premier Division	Division One	Division Two
1998–99	Fulwood Amateurs	Barnoldswick United	Blackpool Wren Rovers
1999–2000	Kirkham & Wesham	Padiham	Burnley Belvedere
2000–01	Kirkham & Wesham	Blackpool Wren Rovers	Crooklands Casuals
2001–02	Kirkham & Wesham	Milnthorpe Corinthians	Coppull United
2002–03	Charnock Richard	Coppull United	Lytham St. Anne's
2003–04	Kirkham & Wesham	Hesketh Bank	Crosshills
2004–05	Kirkham & Wesham	Lytham St. Annes	Haslingden St. Mary's
2005–06	Kirkham & Wesham	Haslingden St. Mary's	Trimpell
2006–07	Kirkham & Wesham	Poulton Town	Vickerstown Cricket Club
2007–08	Garstang	Stoneclough	Crooklands Casuals
2008–09	Charnock Richard	Tempest United	Thornton & Cleveleys
2009–10	Blackpool Wren Rovers	Thornton & Cleveleys	BAC//EE/Springfields
2010–11	Blackpool Wren Rovers	Burnley United	Lytham Town
2011–12	Charnock Richard	Longridge Town	Ambleside United
2012–13	Charnock Richard	Norcross & Warbreck	Hurst Green
2013–14	Charnock Richard	Hesketh Bank	Askam United
2014–15	Charnock Richard	Fulwood Amateurs	Haslingden St. Mary's
2015–16	Blackpool Wren Rovers	Turton	CMB
2016–17	Longridge Town	Haslingden St. Mary's	Fulwood Amateurs Reserves
2017–18	Garstang	Poulton Town	Leyland United
2018-19	Fulwood Amateurs	Lytham Town	Horwich St Marys
2019-20	Seasons not completed due to COVID-19 pandemic		
2020-21	Seasons not completed due to COVID-19 pandemic		
2021-22	Thornton Cleveleys	Milnthorpe Corinthians	Rossendale
2022-23	Burscough Richmond	Lostock St. Gerards	Chipping
2023-24	Thornton Cleveleys	Eagley	Astley and Buckshaw
2024–25	Tempest United	Millom	Pause United

== Member clubs progressing to higher standard leagues ==
Club	Left League	Comments
Blackpool Mechanics	1962	Left to join the Lancashire Combination. Currently play in North West Counties League Premier Division and now known as AFC Blackpool.
Blackpool Wren Rovers	1972	Left to join the Lancashire Combination, and later played in the North West Counties League. Now back playing in the West Lancashire League.
Colne Dynamoes	1975	Left to join the Lancashire Combination, and later played in the North West Counties League and the Northern Premier League. Folded in 1990.
Holker Old Boys	1991	Left to join the North West Counties League. Currently play in North West Counties Football League First Division.
Squires Gate	1991	Left to join the North West Counties League. Currently play in the North West Counties Football League Premier Division.
Nelson	1992	Returned to the North West Counties League. Resigned from the North West Counties Football League Premier Division in 2010. Rejoined NWCFL in 2011, and currently play in the North West Counties Football League First Division.
Padiham	2000	Returned to the North West Counties League. Currently play in the North West Counties Football League Premier Division having spent three seasons in the Northern Premier League Division One North between 2013 and 2016.
Kirkham & Wesham	2007	Left to join the North West Counties League. Currently play in National League, known as AFC Fylde.
Barnoldswick Town	2009	Left to join the North West Counties League. Currently play in North West Counties Football League Premier Division.
AFC Darwen	2010	Returned to the North West Counties League. Currently play in North West Counties Football League Division One North.
Charnock Richard	2016	Left to join the North West Counties League. Currently play in North West Counties Football League Premier Division.
Longridge Town	2018	Left to join the North West Counties Football League. Currently play in North West Counties Football League Division One North.
Garstang	2018	Left to join the North West Counties Football League. Currently play in North West Counties Football League Division One North.
Thornton Cleveleys	2024	Left to join the North West Counties Football League. Currently play in North West Counties Football League Division One North.
Fulwood Amateurs	2025	Left to join the North West Counties Football League. Currently play in North West Counties Football League Division One North.
