= 1888–89 FA Cup qualifying rounds =

Tournament details
- Country: England; Wales; Ireland

The FA Cup, from this season onwards, began to incorporate a series of qualifying rounds in order to determine qualifiers for the actual Cup competition itself. The qualifying rounds were made up of amateur teams, semi-professional teams, and professional sides not yet associated with the Football League. The only game to be played on Christmas Day took place, Linfield Athletic beating Cliftonville 7–0. Everton became the first Football League team to withdraw from the Cup after drawing Ulster in the first qualifying round.

See 1888–89 FA Cup for details of the rounds from the First Round onwards.

== First qualifying round ==
Home team (tier)	Score	Away team (tier)
Saturday 6 October 1888
Ashington	0–4	Elswick Rangers
Chester	2–2	Macclesfield Town – Disqualified
Dulwich	0–13	London Caledonians
Kettering	3–4	Newark
Stoke	1–2	Warwick County
Maidenhead	4–0	Old Etonians
Rochester	2–4	Old Harrovians
Old Wykehamists	1–2	Chatham
Notts County	4–1	Eckington Works
Old Foresters	2–0	Schorne College
Blackburn Olympic	W-W	Fleetwood Rangers – Walkover Home
Heeley	6–1	Redcar
Sheffield	3–2	South Bank - match declared void
Grimsby Town	1–1	Lincoln City
Clitheroe	3–2	Blackburn Park Road
Irwell Springs	4–5	Southport Central
Hurst	0–0	Bolton Wanderers
Middlesbrough	0–1	Ecclesfield
Hartford St John's	1–7	Nantwich
Old Brightonians	W-W	Hendon – Walkover Home
Rawtenstall	3–4	Rossendale
Casuals	W-W	Hitchin – Walkover Home
Burton Swifts	1–3	Leek

Home team (tier)	Score	Away team (tier)
Burton Wanderers	3–0	Wednesbury Old Athletic
Lancing Old Boys	4–0	Millwall Rovers
Horncastle	2–1	Grantham
Chesham	4–2	Lyndhurst
Luton Town	4–0	Reading
Basford Rovers	3–1	Belper Town
Crusaders	5–1	Royal Engineers
Wellington St George's	1–1	Shrewsbury Town
Newcastle West End	7–2	Bishop Auckland Church Institute
Morpeth Harriers	5–0	Whitburn
Over Wanderers	1–5	Chester St Oswalds – Home team Disqualified
Great Bridge Unity	0–1	Aston Shakespeare
Scarborough	2–0	Whitby
Newcastle East End	3–1	Port Clarence
Park Grange	1–0	Rotherham Swifts
Liverpool Stanley	3–0	Workington
Heywood Central	2–3	Astley Bridge
Birtley	2–0	Darlington
Sunderland Albion	8–2	Shankhouse
Ulster	W-W	Everton – Walkover Home
Gorton Villa	2–6	West Manchester
Beeston St John's	2–0	Notts Olympic
Doncaster Rovers	1–9	Rotherham Town
Wrexham	3–0	Davenham

Home team (tier)	Score	Away team (tier)
Replay: Saturday 12 October 1889
Bolton Wanderers	W-W	Hurst – Walkover Home
Lincoln City	1–1	Grimsby Town
Shrewsbury Town	2–1	Wellington St George's
Replay: Saturday 20 October 1889
South Bank	4–0	Sheffield
2nd replay: Wednesday 24 October 1889
Grimsby Town	3–1	Lincoln City

== Second qualifying round ==
Home club	Score	Away club	Date
Chester	5–1	Over Wanderers	27 October 1888
Maidenhead	1–2	Old Brightonians	27 October 1888
Old Harrovians	0–1	Crusaders	27 October 1888
Notts County	4–2	Beeston St John's	27 October 1888
Blackburn Olympic	1–3	Oswaldtwistle Rovers	27 October 1888
Staveley	4–0	Matlock	27 October 1888
Heeley	2–1	South Bank	27 October 1888
Chatham	4–0	London Caledonians	27 October 1888
Clitheroe	0–7	Higher Walton	27 October 1888
South Shore	7–1	Southport Central	27 October 1888
Rossendale	4–3	Darwen	27 October 1888
Derby Midland	2–1	Derby St Luke's	27 October 1888
Leek	4–0	Oldbury Town	27 October 1888
Newark	4–4	Grimsby Town	27 October 1888
Sunderland	5–3	Elswick Rangers	27 October 1888
Casuals	1–3	Clapton	27 October 1888
Chirk	12–0	Nantwich	27 October 1888
Burton Wanderers	4–0	Shrewsbury Town	27 October 1888
Horncastle	0–1	Boston	27 October 1888
Chesham	3–3	Luton Town	27 October 1888
Basford Rovers	0–1	Mellors	27 October 1888
Watford Rovers	6–0	Old Foresters	27 October 1888
Cleethorpes Town	Walkover	Netherfield	
Newcastle West End	1–2	Sunderland Albion	27 October 1888
Swindon Town	2–5	Marlow	27 October 1888
Old St Mark's	3–1	Lancing Old Boys	27 October 1888
Morpeth Harriers	3–1 Match void	Birtley	27 October 1888
Owlerton	3–2	Rotherham Town	27 October 1888
Scarborough	2–4	Ecclesfield	27 October 1888
Newcastle East End	2–1	Stockton	27 October 1888
Warwick County	4–2	Aston Shakespeare	27 October 1888
West Manchester	1–0 Match void	Bolton Wanderers	27 October 1888
Jardines	0–4	Gainsborough Trinity	27 October 1888
Park Grange	2–1 Match void	Attercliffe	27 October 1888
Vale of Llangollen	6–3	Oswestry	27 October 1888
Liverpool Stanley	3–0	Astley Bridge	27 October 1888
YMCA	0–5	Cliftonville	27 October 1888
Ulster	1–7	Linfield Athletic	27 October 1888
Small Heath	3–2	Burslem Port Vale	27 October 1888
Wrexham	3–2	Northwich Victoria	27 October 1888

=== Replays ===
Home club	Score	Away club	Date
Grimsby Town	9–0	Newark	3 November 1888
Luton Town	10–2	Chesham	3 November 1888
Birtley	1–0	Morpeth Harriers	3 November 1888
Bolton Wanderers	9–0	West Manchester	3 November 1888
Park Grange	4–1	Attercliffe	3 November 1888

== Third qualifying round ==
Home club	Score	Away club	Date
Chester	5–1	Vale of Llangollen	17 November 1888
Clapton	0–1	Chatham	17 November 1888
Notts County	2–1	Derby Midland	17 November 1888
Staveley	5–0	Mellors	17 November 1888
Sheffield Heeley	3–1	Park Grange	17 November 1888
Grimsby Town	5–0	Cleethorpes Town	17 November 1888
South Shore	4–0	Oswaldtwistle Rovers	17 November 1888
Rossendale	2–3	Higher Walton	17 November 1888
Sunderland	2–0	Newcastle East End	10 November 1888
Old Brightonians	3–1	Luton Town	17 November 1888
Burton Wanderers	5–1	Warwick County	17 November 1888
Gainsborough Trinity	5–3	Boston	17 November 1888
Crusaders	1–0	Old St Mark's	17 November 1888
Watford Rovers	0–2	Marlow	17 November 1888
Cliftonville	Walkover	Liverpool Stanley	
Owlerton	3–2	Ecclesfield	17 November 1888
Birtley	2–5	Sunderland Albion	17 November 1888
Small Heath	4–0	Leek	17 November 1888
Linfield Athletic	4–0	Bolton Wanderers	17 November 1888
Wrexham	2–1	Chirk	17 November 1888

== Fourth qualifying round ==
Home club	Score	Away club	Date
Chester	2–3	Wrexham	8 December 1888
Staveley	1–3	Notts County	8 December 1888
Sheffield Heeley	5–1	Owlerton	8 December 1888
Chatham	0–0	Crusaders	8 December 1888
Grimsby Town	Walkover	Gainsborough Trinity	
South Shore	5–0	Higher Walton	8 December 1888
Old Brightonians	5–2	Marlow	8 December 1888
Cliftonville	3–3	Linfield Athletic	8 December 1888
Sunderland Albion	Walkover	Sunderland	
Small Heath	9–0	Burton Wanderers	8 December 1888

=== Replays ===
Home club	Score	Away club	Date
Crusaders	2–3	Chatham	15 December 1888
Linfield Athletic	3–3	Cliftonville	15 December 1888

=== Second replay ===
Home club	Score	Away club	Date
Linfield Athletic	7–0	Cliftonville	25 December 1888
