= 1889–90 FA Cup qualifying rounds =

Tournament details
- Country: England; Ireland; Wales

This was the second season where the FA Cup, or the Football Association Challenge Cup, used a series of qualifying rounds in order to determine qualifiers for the actual Cup competition itself.

See 1889–90 FA Cup for details of the rounds from the first round onwards.

== First qualifying round ==
Home team (tier)	Score	Away team (tier)
Saturday 5 October 1889
Boston	0–2	Gainsborough Trinity
Birtley	3–1	Bishop Auckland
Bishop Auckland Church Institute	0–9	Stockton
Chatham	4–5	Crusaders
Chesham	0–1	Maidenhead
Chester	2–0	Over Wanderers
Chester St Oswald's	4–0	Druids
Clapton	W–W	London Caledonians
Darlington St Augustine's	5–0	Darlington
Denton	1–5	Gorton Villa
Derby Junction	4–2	Matlock Town
Dulwich	0–9	Old St Paul's
Gateshead NER	1–0	Elswick Rangers
Halliwell	5–0	Clitheroe
Heanor Town	7–1	Long Eaton Midland
Jardines	4–1	Notts Swifts
Macclesfield Town	2–4	Hartford & Davenham United
Middlesbrough	3–4	South Bank
Millwall Athletic	0–4	Schorne College
Newcastle East End	4–0	Shankhouse

Home team (tier)	Score	Away team (tier)
Newcastle West End	9–1	Port Clarence
Old Brightonians	4–0	Marlow
Old Harrovians	2–4	Thorpe
Old St Mark's	5–5	Norwich CEYMS
Old Wykehamists	3–4	Rochester
Owlerton	1–9	Rotherham Swifts
Redcar	1–0	Clinton F.C.
Rotherham Town	2–1	Doncaster Rovers
Royal Arsenal	11–0	Lyndhurst
Scarborough	1–6	Sheffield United
Shrewsbury Town	3–2	Nantwich
South Shore	W–W	Workington
Whitburn	7–1	Morpeth Harriers
Walsall Town Swifts	3–0	Wellington St George's
Watford Rovers	5–3	Swindon Town
Wednesbury Old Athletic	1–0	Leek
Replays
Saturday 12 October 1889
Old St Mark's	2-1	Norwich CEYMS
Whitby	6–0	Attercliffe

== Second qualifying round ==
Home team (tier)	Score	Away team (tier)
Saturday 26 October 1889
Chester	1–0	Burslem Port Vale
Clapton	3–0	Rochester
South Bank	3–0	Whitburn
Reading	3–4	Old St Paul's
Sheffield	2–0	Walkley
Maidenhead	1–2	Luton Town
Old Etonians	3–3	Old Brightonians
Northwich Victoria	3–1	Wrexham
South Shore	3–1	Witton
Redcar	1–8	Rotherham Town
Long Eaton Rangers	1–3	Staveley
Derby Junction	6–1	Belper Town
Notts Rangers	3–2	Beeston
Casuals	3–8	Swifts
Lincoln City	2–1	Notts Olympic
Higher Walton	W–W	Blackburn Park Road
Burton Swifts	5–3	Great Bridge Unity
Burton Wanderers	2–3	Wednesbury Old Athletic
Gainsborough Trinity	W–W	Kettering
Crusaders	2–0	Old St Mark's
Distillery	(Bye)	
Warwick County	1–1	Walsall Town Swifts
Chester St Oswald's	6–1	Shrewsbury Town

Home team (tier)	Score	Away team (tier)
Liverpool Stanley	0–2	Halliwell
Oldbury Town	1–3	Small Heath
Birtley	1–2	Newcastle West End
Stockton	5–0	Gateshead NER
Belfast YMCA	(Bye)	
Gorton Villa	2–7	Darwen
Whitby	1–5	Rotherham Swifts
Schorne College	1–2	Watford Rovers
Beeston St John's	1–3	Jardines
Linfield Athletic	4–0	Cliftonville
Loughborough	2–1	Derby St Luke
Sheffield United	1–0	Sheffield Heeley
Heanor Town	2–7	Derby Midland
Hartford & Davenham United	0–4	Crewe Alexandra
Thorpe	2–2	Royal Arsenal
North End Athletic	(Bye)	
Darlington St Augustine's	2–1	Newcastle East End
Replays
Saturday 2 November 1889
Old Brightonians	4–1	Old Etonians
Walsall Town Swifts	2–0	Warwick County
Derby St Luke	2–0	Loughborough
Royal Arsenal	W–W	Thorpe

== Third qualifying round ==
Home team (tier)	Score	Away team (tier)
Saturday 16 November 1889
Clapton	W–W	Old Brightonians
Darwen	4–1	Halliwell
Staveley	2–0	Derby Junction
Wednesbury Old Athletic	1–5	Small Heath
South Shore	6–2	Higher Walton
Crewe Alexandra	9–0	Northwich Victoria
Derby St Luke's	0–1	Derby Midland
Notts Rangers	2–7	Lincoln City
Burton Swifts	1–6	Walsall Town Swifts
Watford Rovers	2–5	Swifts
Newcastle West End	5–2	South Bank
Distillery	W–W	Belfast YMCA

Home team (tier)	Score	Away team (tier)
Jardines	2–2	Gainsborough Trinity
Chester St Oswald's	0–3	Chester
Stockton	3–1	Darlington St Augustine's
Linfield Athletic	W–W	North End Athletic
Rotherham Swifts	0–0	Rotherham Town
Sheffield United	3–0	Sheffield
Royal Arsenal	5–2	Crusaders
Old St Paul's	4–0	Luton Town
Replays
Saturday 18 November 1889/Monday 2 December 1889
Rotherham Town	3–1	Rotherham Swifts
Saturday 25 November 1889
Gainsborough Trinity	4–1	Jardines

== Fourth qualifying round ==
Home team (tier)	Score	Away team (tier)
Saturday 7 December 1889
Chester	2–1	Crewe Alexandra
South Shore	2–0	Darwen
Rotherham Town	2–2	Sheffield United
Derby Midland	6–0	Staveley
Lincoln City	5–3	Gainsborough Trinity
Distillery	3–3	Linfield Athletic
Stockton	0–1	Newcastle West End

Home team (tier)	Score	Away team (tier)
Small Heath	4–0	Walsall Town Swifts
Royal Arsenal	1–5	Swifts
Old St Paul's	0–6	Clapton
Replays
Saturday 21 December 1889
Sheffield United	2–1	Rotherham Town
Linfield Athletic	3–5	Distillery
