= 1886–87 FA Cup =

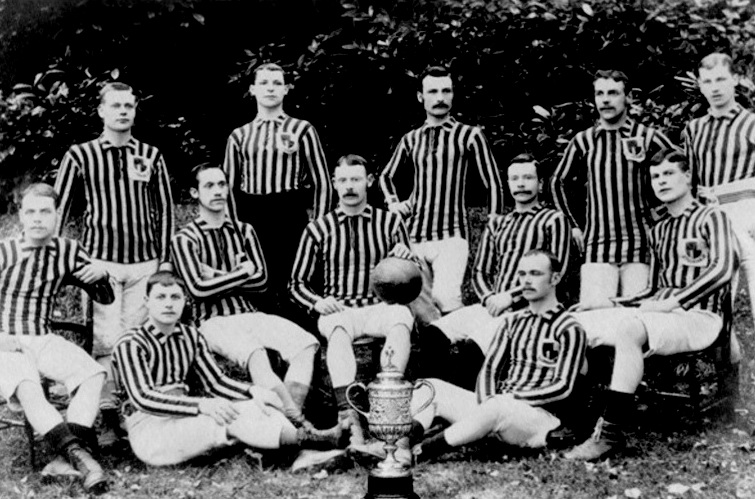
- The Aston Villa team following the final

Tournament details
- Country: England; Scotland; Wales; Ireland
- Teams: 128

Final positions
- Champions: Aston Villa (1st title)
- Runners-up: West Bromwich Albion

The 1886–87 Football Association Challenge Cup was the 16th FA Cup, England's oldest football tournament. One hundred and twenty-eight teams entered, two fewer than the previous season, in addition to four of the one hundred and twenty-eight never playing a match.

== Rejected entries ==
The Football Association rejected entries from the following clubs for being received too late:

- Aston Shakespeare
- Bury
- Eckington Works
- Hurst
- Lancing Old Boys
- Romford
- Sheffield Wednesday
- Stafford Rangers
- Stafford Road
- Walsall Swifts
- Wellington Town

One consequence of this was that a number of Sheffield Wednesday players registered to play with Lockwood Brothers instead, resulting in the works side's best FA Cup run.

== First round ==
Home club	Score	Away club	Date
Clapton	0–5	Crusaders	23 October 1886
Darwen	7–1	Heart of Midlothian (Scotland)	30 October 1886
South Bank	0–4	Gainsborough Trinity	30 October 1886
Stoke	10–1	Carnarvon Wanderers (Wales)	30 October 1886
Sheffield	0–3	Notts Rangers	30 October 1886
Clapham Rovers	0–6	Old Brightonians	30 October 1886
Queen's Park (Scotland)	0–3	Preston North End	30 October 1886
Upton Park	9–0	1st Surrey Rifles	23 October 1886
Old Etonians	1–0	Royal Engineers	30 October 1886
Swifts	13–0	Luton Wanderers	23 October 1886
Rochester	0–2	Marlow	23 October 1886
Old Wykehamists	3–0	Hanover United	30 October 1886
Old Harrovians	0–4	Old Westminsters	30 October 1886
Notts County	13–0	Basford Rovers	30 October 1886
Hendon	1–2	London Caledonians	30 October 1886
Old Foresters	Walkover *	Cannon	
Nottingham Forest	3–0	Notts Olympic	30 October 1886
Blackburn Rovers	Walkover	Halliwell	
Hotspur	3–1	Luton Town	23 October 1886
Aston Villa	13–0	Wednesbury Old Athletic	30 October 1886
Old Carthusians	2–1	Reading	23 October 1886
Blackburn Olympic	1–3	Partick Thistle (Scotland)	23 October 1886
Astley Bridge	3–3	Burnley	23 October 1886
Staveley	7–0	Attercliffe	30 October 1886
Small Heath Alliance	1–3	Mitchell St. George's	30 October 1886
Sheffield Heeley	1–4	Grimsby Town	30 October 1886
Bootle	2–4	Great Lever	16 October 1886
Blackburn Park Road	2–2	Cliftonville (Ireland)	9 October 1886
Bolton Wanderers	5–3	South Shore	30 October 1886
Lockwood Brothers	1–0	Long Eaton Rangers	30 October 1886
Chatham	Walkover	Bournemouth Rovers	
Northwich Victoria	10–0	Furness Vale Rovers	30 October 1886
Church	1–1	Rawtenstall	30 October 1886
Aston Unity	1–4	Derby County	30 October 1886
South Reading	0–2	Maidenhead	30 October 1886
Redcar	4–0	Tyne Association	30 October 1886
Wrexham Olympic (Wales)	1–4	Crewe Alexandra	23 October 1886
Wolverhampton Wanderers	6–0	Matlock	30 October 1886
West Bromwich Albion	6–0	Burton Wanderers	30 October 1886
Birmingham Excelsior	3–3	Derby Midland	30 October 1886
Leek	2–1	Druids (Wales)	23 October 1886
Sunderland	2–1 Match void	Newcastle West End	30 October 1886
Derby St Luke's	3–3	Walsall Town	30 October 1886
Darwen Old Wanderers	1–4	Cowlairs (Scotland)	23 October 1886
Goldenhill	4–2 Match void	Macclesfield Town	30 October 1886
Casuals	2–4	Dulwich	30 October 1886
Chirk (Wales)	8–1	Hartford St John's	23 October 1886
Oswaldtwistle Rovers	2–3	Witton	23 October 1886
Burton Swifts	0–1	Crosswell's Brewery	30 October 1886
Bollington	2–8	Oswestry	30 October 1886
Burslem Port Vale	1–1	Davenham	30 October 1886
Lincoln Lindum	0–1	Grantham	23 October 1886
Third Lanark (Scotland)	5–0	Higher Walton	16 October 1886
Horncastle	2–0	Darlington	30 October 1886
Rangers (Scotland)	Walkover ***	Everton	30 October 1886
Chesham	4–2	Lyndhurst	30 October 1886
Wellington St George's	0–1	Derby Junction	30 October 1886
Fleetwood Rangers	Walkover **	Newton Heath	30 October 1886
Renton (Scotland)	1–0	Accrington	30 October 1886
Bishop Auckland Church Institute	0–1	Middlesbrough	30 October 1886
Cleethorpes Town	2–1	Mellors	30 October 1886
Swindon Town	1–0	Watford Rovers	23 October 1886

[*] The Cannon side (from Tottenham) had entered the competition without being registered with the Football Association, so was ineligible to play

[**] Newton Heath turned up for the match with several ineligible players, and so scratched before the game; the sides played a friendly, which ended 2-2.

[***] Due to a number of their first-team being ineligible to play, Everton scratched to Rangers and played a friendly match instead, with Rangers winning 1-0

=== Replays ===
Home club	Score	Away club	Date
Burnley	2–2 Burnley disqualified	Astley Bridge	30 October 1886
Cliftonville (Ireland)	7–2	Blackburn Park Road	23 October 1886
Rawtenstall	1–7	Church	13 November 1886
Derby Midland	2–1	Birmingham Excelsior	13 November 1886
Newcastle West End	1–0	Sunderland	13 November 1886
Walsall Town	6–1	Derby St Luke's	13 November 1886
Macclesfield Town	2–3	Goldenhill	13 November 1886
Burslem Port Vale	3–0	Davenham	13 November 1886

== Second round ==
Home club	Score	Away club	Date
Chester	1–0 Chester disqualified	Goldenhill	20 November 1886
Darwen	Walkover	Astley Bridge	
Grantham	3–2	Redcar	20 November 1886
Preston North End	6–0	Witton	13 November 1886
Marlow	4–0	Upton Park	20 November 1886
Maidenhead	2–3	Dulwich	20 November 1886
Swifts	7–1	Swindon Town	20 November 1886
Old Wykehamists	0–1	London Caledonians	20 November 1886
Notts County	3–3	Notts Rangers	13 November 1886
Old Foresters	Bye		
Nottingham Forest	2–2	Grimsby Town	13 November 1886
Aston Villa	6–1	Derby Midland	20 November 1886
Old Carthusians	4–2	Crusaders	13 November 1886
Staveley	4–0	Rotherham Town	20 November 1886
Chatham	1–0	Hotspur	20 November 1886
Walsall Town	Bye		
Horncastle	Bye		
Northwich Victoria	0–0	Chirk (Wales)	13 November 1886
Great Lever	1–3	Cliftonville (Ireland)	13 November 1886
Wolverhampton Wanderers	14–0	Crosswell's Brewery	13 November 1886
Rossendale	2–10	Cowlairs (Scotland)	20 November 1886
Crewe Alexandra	6–4	Stoke	20 November 1886
Middlesbrough	1–1	Lincoln City	20 November 1886
West Bromwich Albion	2–1	Derby Junction	20 November 1886
Leek	4–2	Oswestry	20 November 1886
Derby County	1–2	Mitchell St George's	20 November 1886
Old Brightonians	1–1	Old Westminsters	16 November 1886
Burslem Port Vale	Bye		
Third Lanark (Scotland)	2–3	Bolton Wanderers	13 November 1886
Rangers (Scotland)	2–1	Church	21 November 1886
Chesham	1–7	Old Etonians	20 November 1886
Partick Thistle (Scotland)	7–0	Fleetwood Rangers	20 November 1886
Renton (Scotland)	2–2	Blackburn Rovers	20 November 1886
Cleethorpes Town	1–4	Lockwood Brothers	20 November 1886
Newcastle West End	2–6	Gainsborough Trinity	20 November 1886

=== Replays ===
Home club	Score	Away club	Date
Notts County	5–0	Notts Rangers	20 November 1886
Grimsby Town	0–1	Nottingham Forest	20 November 1886
Chirk (Wales)	3–0	Northwich Victoria	20 November 1886
Lincoln City	2–0	Middlesbrough	27 November 1886
Old Westminsters	3–0	Old Brightonians	20 November 1886
Blackburn Rovers	0–2	Renton (Scotland)	4 December 1886

== Third round ==
Home club	Score	Away club	Date
Darwen	4–3	Bolton Wanderers	11 December 1886
Marlow	3–0	Dulwich	11 December 1886
Old Etonians	0–3	Old Westminsters	11 December 1886
Swifts	Bye		
Aston Villa	2–2	Wolverhampton Wanderers	11 December 1886
Old Carthusians	walkover	London Caledonians	
Staveley	0–3	Notts County	11 December 1886
Lockwood Brothers	2–1	Nottingham Forest	11 December 1886
Chatham	1–4	Old Foresters	11 December 1886
Walsall Town	2–7	Mitchell St George's	11 December 1886
Crewe Alexandra	Bye		
West Bromwich Albion	Bye		
Leek	2–2	Burslem Port Vale	11 December 1886
Chirk (Wales)	0–0	Goldenhill	11 December 1886
Horncastle	2–0	Grantham	9 December 1886
Rangers (Scotland)	3–2	Cowlairs (Scotland)	4 December 1886
Gainsborough Trinity	2–2	Lincoln City	11 December 1886
Renton (Scotland)	0–2	Preston North End	11 December 1886
Cliftonville (Ireland)	1-11	Partick Thistle (Scotland)	4 December 1886

=== Replays ===
Home club	Score	Away club	Date
Wolverhampton Wanderers	1–1	Aston Villa	15 January 1887
Wolverhampton Wanderers	3–3	Aston Villa	22 January 1887
Aston Villa	2–0	Wolverhampton Wanderers	29 January 1887
Burslem Port Vale	1–3	Leek	20 January 1887
Chirk (Wales)	Walkover	Goldenhill	
Lincoln City	1–0	Gainsborough Trinity	24 January 1887

== Fourth round ==
Home club	Score	Away club	Date
Darwen	Bye		
Preston North End	Bye		
Marlow	Bye		
Swifts	0–2	Old Foresters	15 January 1887
Notts County	Bye		
Aston Villa	Bye		
Old Carthusians	Bye		
Mitchell St George's	0–1	West Bromwich Albion	15 January 1887
Lockwood Brothers	Bye		
Old Westminsters	Bye		
Crewe Alexandra	0–1	Leek	29 January 1887
Lincoln City	Bye		
Chirk (Wales)	Bye		
Horncastle	Bye		
Rangers (Scotland)	Bye		
Partick Thistle (Scotland)	Bye		

== Fifth round ==
Home club	Score	Away club	Date
Notts County	5–2	Marlow	29 January 1887
Old Foresters	0–3	Preston North End	29 January 1887
Aston Villa	5–0	Horncastle F.C.	5 February 1887
Lockwood Brothers	0–1 Match void	West Bromwich Albion	29 January 1887
Old Westminsters	1–0	Partick Thistle (Scotland)	29 January 1887
Leek	0–2	Old Carthusians	5 February 1887
Chirk (Wales)	1–2	Darwen	22 January 1887
Rangers (Scotland)	3–0	Lincoln City	29 January 1887

=== Replay ===
Home club	Score	Away club	Date
West Bromwich Albion	2–1	Lockwood Brothers	12 February 1887

== Sixth Round ==
Home club	Score	Away club	Date
Notts County	1–4	West Bromwich Albion	19 February 1887
Aston Villa	3–2	Darwen	12 February 1887
Old Carthusians	1–2	Preston North End	2 March 1887
Rangers (Scotland)	5–1	Old Westminsters	19 February 1887

== Semi-finals ==
Home Club	Score	Away Club	Date	Venue
Aston Villa	3–1	Rangers (Scotland)	5 March 1887	
West Bromwich Albion	3–1	Preston North End	5 March 1887	

== Final ==
Home club	Score	Away club	Date
Aston Villa	2–0	West Bromwich Albion	2 April 1887
