= Long Eaton Midland F.C. =

Long Eaton Midland
- Full name: Long Eaton Midland Football Club
- Nickname(s): the Midlanders, the Mids
- Founded: 1884
- Dissolved: 1890
- Ground: College Road
Home colours

Long Eaton Midland Football Club was a football club based in Long Eaton, Derbyshire, England, active in the late 19th century.

== History ==
The earliest record for the club is from the 1884–85 season, originally under the name Long Eaton Midland Star, although this was shortened by the end of the campaign. As the town was represented by Long Eaton Rangers at a senior level, Midland played amateur football, and gained an early success by winning the Derbyshire Minor Cup in 1887–88, beating Breaston 1–0 at Long Eaton Rangers' Recreation Park; left-winger Clarke scored the only goal in the 73rd minute, and Breaston had a late "goal" disallowed for offside.

The Mids optimistically entered the 1889–90 FA Cup qualifying rounds, but lost 7–1 at Heanor Town, conceding five without reply in the first half; Osborne scored for Long Eaton soon after the start of the second half, but two goals in the last two minutes made the score look more humiliating.

The club also lost in the first round of the Derbyshire Senior Cup, handicapped by two players (one being goalkeeper Marriott) not turning up to the tie at Sheffield Heeley due to a misunderstanding, and by the end of the season the club was having to deny rumours that it had broken up. It did enter the Derbyshire Cup for 1890–91, but did not play a tie, as by October the club definitely had broken up.

== Colours ==
The club's colours were blue and white.

== Ground ==
The club played at College Road.
