= 1887–88 FA Cup =

Tournament details
- Country: England; Wales; Ireland
- Teams: 149

Final positions
- Champions: West Bromwich Albion (1st title)
- Runners-up: Preston North End

The 1887–88 Football Association Challenge Cup was the 17th staging of the FA Cup, England's oldest football tournament. One hundred and forty-nine teams entered, twenty-one more than the previous season, although four of the one hundred and forty-nine never played a match.

This was the last season in which there were no qualifying rounds, so all entering clubs were placed in the first round. After the formation of the Football League, a set of qualifying rounds was introduced, with the Football Association holding a vote to determine 16 sides exempt to the first round proper.

== First round proper ==
Home club	Score	Away club	Date
Chester	2–3	Davenham	15 October 1887
Burnley	4–0 Match void	Darwen Old Wanderers	15 October 1887
Grantham	4–0	Lincoln Lindum	15 October 1887
Preston North End	26–0	Hyde	15 October 1887
South Bank	3–2	Newcastle East End	15 October 1887
Stoke	1–0	Burslem Port Vale	15 October 1887
Matlock	2–3	Rotherham Town	15 October 1887
Reading	0–2 Match void	Dulwich	15 October 1887
Sheffield	1–3	Lockwood Brothers	15 October 1887
Hitchin	2–5	Old Wykehamists	8 October 1887
Royal Engineers	3–0 Match void	Rochester	15 October 1887
Marlow	4–1	South Reading	8 October 1887
Old Etonians	4–2	Lancing Old Boys	8 October 1887
Swifts	3–1	Maidenhead	15 October 1887
Notts County	9–0	Lincoln Ramblers	15 October 1887
Hendon	2–4	Old Harrovians	15 October 1887
Nottingham Forest	2–1	Notts Swifts	15 October 1887
Blackburn Rovers	Walkover	Bury	
Hotspur	Bye		
Stafford Road	2–1 Match void	Great Bridge Unity	15 October 1887
Old Carthusians	5–0	Hanover United	15 October 1887
Blackburn Olympic	Bye		
Staveley	1–2	Derby County	15 October 1887
Small Heath Alliance	6–1	Aston Unity	15 October 1887
Sheffield Heeley	9–0	Attercliffe	15 October 1887
Bootle	6–0	Workington	15 October 1887
Blackburn Park Road	2–1 Match void	Distillery (Ireland)	8 October 1887
Bolton Wanderers	1–0 Match void	Everton	15 October 1887
Accrington	11–0	Rossendale	15 October 1887
Chatham	5–1	Luton Town	15 October 1887
Walsall Town	1–2	Mitchell St George's	15 October 1887
South Shore	Walkover	Denton	
Church	Walkover	Cliftonville (Ireland)	
Macclesfield Town	1–3	Shrewsbury Town	15 October 1887
Walsall Swifts	1–2	Wolverhampton Wanderers	15 October 1887
Old Westminsters	4–1	Clapton	15 October 1887
Wrexham Olympic	Bye		
Hurst	5–3 Match void	Astley Bridge	15 October 1887
Crewe Alexandra	5–0	Druids (Wales)	15 October 1887
Long Eaton Rangers	6–3	Park Grange	15 October 1887
Middlesbrough	4–0	Whitburn	15 October 1887
West Bromwich Albion	7–1	Wednesbury Old Athletic	15 October 1887
Birmingham Excelsior	4–1 Match void	Warwick County	15 October 1887
Leek	2–2	Northwich Victoria	15 October 1887
Sunderland	4–2 Match void	Morpeth Harriers	15 October 1887
Old Brightonians	1–0	Swindon Town	8 October 1887
Derby Junction	3–2	Derby St Luke's	15 October 1887
Rawtenstall	1–3	Darwen	15 October 1887
Notts Rangers	10–1	Jardines	15 October 1887
Notts Olympic	3–6 Match void	Notts Mellors	15 October 1887
Lincoln City	4–1	Horncastle Town	15 October 1887
Chirk (Wales)	4–1	Chester St Oswalds	15 October 1887
Oswaldtwistle Rovers	3–4	Witton	15 October 1887
Higher Walton	Walkover	Heywood Central	15 October 1887
Burton Swifts	7–0	Southfield	15 October 1887
Chesham	4–2 Match void	Watford Rovers	15 October 1887
Gainsborough Trinity	7–0	Boston	15 October 1887
Basford Rovers	3–2	Lincoln Albion	15 October 1887
Crusaders	9–0	Lyndhurst	15 October 1887
Fleetwood Rangers	4–1	West Manchester	15 October 1887
Cleethorpes Town	0–4	Grimsby Town	15 October 1887
Newcastle West End	5–1	Redcar	15 October 1887
London Caledonians	1–6	Old Foresters	15 October 1887
Old St Mark's	7–2	East Sheen	15 October 1887
Owlerton	2–1	Eckington Works	15 October 1887
Millwall Rovers	Walkover	Casuals	
Over Wanderers	3–1	Wellington St George's	15 October 1887
Ecclesfield	4–1	Derby Midland	15 October 1887
Scarborough	3–5	Shankhouse	15 October 1887
Belper Town	2–3	The Wednesday	15 October 1887
Vale of Llangollen (Wales)	1–3 Match void	Oswestry	8 October 1887
Aston Shakespeare	2–3 Match void	Burton Wanderers	15 October 1887
Darlington	3–0	Gateshead Association	15 October 1887
Liverpool Stanley	1–5	Halliwell	15 October 1887
Oldbury Town	0–4	Aston Villa	15 October 1887
Elswick Rangers	3–3	Bishop Auckland Church Institute	15 October 1887

=== Replays ===
Home club	Score	Away club	Date
Burnley	Walkover	Darwen Old Wanderers	
Dulwich	Walkover	Reading	
Royal Engineers	Walkover	Rochester	
Great Bridge Unity	1–1	Stafford Road	22 October 1887
Great Bridge Unity	Walkover	Stafford Road	
Everton	2–2	Bolton Wanderers	29 October 1887
Everton	1–1	Bolton Wanderers	12 November 1887
Everton	Match void	Bolton Wanderers	19 November 1887
Astley Bridge	Walkover	Hurst	
Warwick County	0–5	Birmingham Excelsior	22 October 1887
Northwich Victoria	4–2	Leek	22 October 1887
Morpeth Harriers	2–3	Sunderland	22 October 1887
Notts Olympic	1–2	Notts Mellors	22 October 1887
Watford Rovers	3–1	Chesham	22 October 1887
Vale of Llangollen (Wales)	0–2	Oswestry	22 October 1887
Aston Shakespeare	Walkover	Burton Wanderers	22 October 1887
Bishop Auckland Church Institute	0–2	Elswick Rangers	22 October 1887

== Second round proper ==
Home club	Score	Away club	Date
Darlington	4–3	Elswick Rangers	5 November 1887
Darwen	2–0	Church	5 November 1887
Dulwich	2–1	Hotspur	5 November 1887
Preston North End	9–1	Bolton Wanderers	17 December 1887
Shankhouse	Bye		
Marlow	2–3	Old Foresters	5 November 1887
Old Etonians	3–2	Old St Mark's	5 November 1887
Swifts	Bye		
Old Harrovians	0–4	Old Brightonians	5 November 1887
Notts County	Walkover	Basford Rovers	
Nottingham Forest	2–0	Notts Mellors	5 November 1887
Blackburn Olympic	1–5	Blackburn Rovers	5 November 1887
Astley Bridge	0–4	Halliwell	5 November 1887
Mitchell St George's	0–1	West Bromwich Albion	5 November 1887
Small Heath Alliance	0–4	Aston Villa	5 November 1887
Bootle	1–1	South Shore	5 November 1887
Accrington	3–2	Burnley	5 November 1887
Lockwood Brothers	Bye		
Chatham	3–1	Royal Engineers	5 November 1887
Grimsby Town	Bye		
Northwich Victoria	0–1	Crewe Alexandra	5 November 1887
Oswestry	Bye		
Old Westminsters	8–1	Millwall Rovers	5 November 1887
Wrexham Olympic (Wales)	1–2	Davenham	5 November 1887
Wolverhampton Wanderers	3–0	Aston Shakespeare	5 November 1887
Long Eaton Rangers	1–2	The Wednesday	5 November 1887
Middlesbrough	4–1	South Bank	5 November 1887
Birmingham Excelsior	Bye		
Sunderland	3–1	Newcastle West End	5 November 1887
Derby County	6–0	Ecclesfield	5 November 1887
Derby Junction	3–2	Rotherham Town	5 November 1887
Notts Rangers	4–0	Grantham	5 November 1887
Lincoln City	2–1	Gainsborough Trinity	5 November 1887
Chirk (Wales)	10–2	Shrewsbury Town	5 November 1887
Burton Swifts	2–5	Great Bridge Unity	5 November 1887
Crusaders	3–2	Old Wykehamists	29 October 1887
Fleetwood Rangers	1–3	Higher Walton	5 November 1887
Watford Rovers	1–3	Old Carthusians	5 November 1887
Owlerton	1–0	Sheffield Heeley	5 November 1887
Distillery (Ireland)	2–4	Witton	5 November 1887
Over Wanderers	0–2	Stoke	5 November 1887

=== Replay ===
Home club	Score	Away club	Date
South Shore	0–3	Bootle	12 November 1887

== Third round proper ==
Home club	Score	Away club	Date
Darlington	0–2	Shankhouse	26 November 1887
Darwen	1–1	Witton	26 November 1887
Dulwich	1–3	Swifts	26 November 1887
Preston North End	4–0	Halliwell	3 December 1887
Stoke	3–0	Oswestry	26 November 1887
Old Etonians	7–2	Old Westminsters	26 November 1887
Old Foresters	Bye		
Nottingham Forest	2–1	Notts County	26 November 1887
Aston Villa	Bye		
Old Carthusians	5–0	Old Brightonians	24 November 1887
The Wednesday	Bye		
Accrington	1–3	Blackburn Rovers	26 November 1887
Grimsby Town	2–0	Lincoln City	26 November 1887
Davenham	2–2	Chirk (Wales)	19 November 1887
Crewe Alexandra	Bye		
Middlesbrough	2–2	Sunderland	26 November 1887
West Bromwich Albion	2–0	Wolverhampton Wanderers	26 November 1887
Derby County	6–2	Owlerton	26 November 1887
Derby Junction	2–1	Lockwood Brothers	19 November 1887
Notts Rangers	Bye		
Higher Walton	1–6	Bootle	26 November 1887
Crusaders	4–0	Chatham	26 November 1887
Great Bridge Unity	2–1	Birmingham Excelsior	26 November 1887

=== Replays ===
Home club	Score	Away club	Date
Witton	0–2	Darwen	3 December 1887
Chirk (Wales)	6–1	Davenham	26 November 1887
Sunderland	4–2 Sunderland disqualified	Middlesbrough	3 December 1887

== Fourth round proper ==
Home club	Score	Away club	Date
Darwen	3–1	Notts Rangers	17 December 1887
Preston North End	Bye		
Stoke	Bye		
Shankhouse	0–9	Aston Villa	17 December 1887
Old Foresters	4–2	Grimsby Town	17 December 1887
Nottingham Forest	6–0	Old Etonians	17 December 1887
Blackburn Rovers	Bye		
Old Carthusians	Bye		
Crewe Alexandra	2–2	Swifts	10 December 1887
Middlesbrough	Bye		
West Bromwich Albion	Bye		
Derby County	Bye		
Derby Junction	Bye		
Chirk (Wales)	Bye		
Crusaders	0–1	The Wednesday	17 December 1887
Great Bridge Unity	1–2	Bootle	17 December 1887

=== Replays ===
Home club	Score	Away club	Date
Swifts	3–2 Match void	Crewe Alexandra	17 December 1887
Crewe Alexandra	2–1	Swifts	31 December 1887

== Fifth round proper ==
Home club	Score	Away club	Date
Darwen	0–3	Blackburn Rovers	7 January 1888
Nottingham Forest	2–4	The Wednesday	7 January 1888
Aston Villa	1–3	Preston North End	7 January 1888
Old Carthusians	2–0	Bootle	7 January 1888
Crewe Alexandra	1–0	Derby County	7 January 1888
Middlesbrough	4–0	Old Foresters	7 January 1888
West Bromwich Albion	4–1	Stoke	7 January 1888
Chirk (Wales)	1–1	Derby Junction	31 December 1887

=== Replays ===
Home club	Score	Away club	Date
Derby Junction	1-0	Chirk (Wales)	7 January 1888

== Sixth round proper ==
28 January 1888	Middlesbrough	0–2	Crewe Alexandra

28 January 1888	West Bromwich Albion	4–2	Old Carthusians

28 January 1888	Derby Junction	2–1	Blackburn Rovers

30 January 1888	The Wednesday	1–3	Preston North End

== Semi-finals ==
18 February 1888	Preston North End	4–0	Crewe Alexandra

18 February 1888	West Bromwich Albion	3–0	Derby Junction

== Final ==
24 March 1888
15:00 GMT (UTC±00:00)

West Bromwich Albion	2–1	Preston North End
George Woodhall; Jem Bayliss		Fred Dewhurst

Kennington Oval, London
Attendance: 19,000
Referee: Francis Marindin
