= Derby Junction F.C. =

English former football club, based in Derby

Derby Junction
- Full name: Derby Junction Football Club
- Nickname: The Juncs
- Founded: 1870
- Dissolved: 1895; 131 years ago
- Ground: Derby Arboretum
- Secretary: G. Draper
c. 1883–87 colours	1887–91 colours

Derby Junction Football Club were an amateur football club in Derby, England. They were active in the 1880s and 1890s, notably being founder members of the Midland League in 1890 and FA Cup semi-finalists in 1888. They played at Derby Arboretum.

== History ==
Derby Junction first developed as an old boys' team for Junction Street School, and were renamed Derby Junction Street in 1885, at some point dropping 'Street'. Reports suggest the team began playing at some point in the early 1880s, although the club claimed a foundation date of 1870.

The club's first notable success came in the Birmingham Senior Cup, in which it reached the quarter-final in 1886–87, going down at Small Heath Alliance by the only goal, albeit only after a protest as to the state of the pitch overturned the Heathens' original 4–0 win. The following season, the club reached the FA Cup semi-final. They won all of their ties in the early rounds by one goal margins, received a bye in the fourth round, then beat Welsh side Chirk to secure their place in the last eight. They were drawn at home to the holders, Blackburn Rovers. The team spent a week at Matlock Bath to prepare for the tie, which was paid for by public subscription. In front of a crowd estimated at nearly 7,000, and with a bumpy and icy pitch acting as a leveller, the Juncs - given odds of 100/30 against to win the match - pulled off an unexpected 2–1 win, coming from behind with goals from S. Smith and W. Hopkins, to reach the last four. Their run came to an end in the semi-finals when they lost to eventual winners West Bromwich Albion at Stoke. The club gained considerable consolation the following month, when it won the Derbyshire Senior Cup, thanks to a 2–0 replay win over Staveley, the goals - scored by Radford and Bromage - both coming in the first half, and Radford also having two disallowed for offside; the Juncs were the first team from the town to take the trophy.

The formation of the Football League in 1888 meant that clubs outside it were forced to look for alternative competition. The Juncs were one of the members of The Combination in 1888–89, but the competition fell apart before the season end, and the club had only won 2 of the 12 fixtures it played; it was not one of those which was involved in setting up the Football Alliance, a more regular competition.

The club folded in 1895 as professionalism, which the club had always deprecated, began to spread into the game. The club's final match was on Christmas Day 1895 - an 8–1 defeat to the Derby County reserves.

== Colours ==
In 1882, the club's colours were red and navy blue thin stripes on the shirt with white shorts and navy socks; at some time before 1887 they had switched to a green shirt with a gold sash, white shorts, and green socks. In 1887 the club changed its colours to amber and black, arranged in stripes, with white shorts and black socks. The club changed again in December 1891, to white jerseys with red sleeves, presented to the club by a Mrs Ragg, the wife of a club benefactor.

== Ground ==
The club played on the Arboretum Field, originally using the Rose Hill Tavern for facilities.

== Full F.A. Cup Results ==
1884 - 1885:

Round	Date	Opposition	Score
1st	25 October 1884	West Bromwich Albion (A)	1 - 7

1885 - 1886:

Round	Date	Opposition	Score
1st	31 October 1885	Darwen (A)	2 - 2
Replay	7 November 1885	Darwen (A)	0 - 4

Note: The results archive on the official F.A. website shows Darwen as the home team for both the original tie and the replay.

1886 - 1887:

Round	Date	Opposition	Score
1st	30 October 1886	Wellington St. George's (A)	1 - 0
2nd	20 November 1886	West Bromwich Albion (A)	1 - 2

1887 - 1888:

Round	Date	Opposition	Score
1st	15 October 1887	Derby St. Luke's (H)	3 - 2
2nd	5 November 1887	Rotherham Town (H)	3 - 2
3rd	19 November 1887	Lockwood Brothers (H)	2 - 1
4th	-	Bye	N/A
5th	31 December 1887	Chirk (A)	1 - 0
6th	28 January 1888	Blackburn Rovers (H)	2 - 1
SF	18 February 1888	West Bromwich Albion (N)	0 - 3

1888 - 1889:

Round	Date	Opposition	Score
1st	2 February 1889	Derby County (A)	0 - 1

1889 - 1890:

Round	Date	Opposition	Score
1Q	5 October 1889	Matlock Town (H)	4 - 2
2Q	26 October 1889	Belper Town (H)	6 - 1
3Q	16 November 1889	Staveley (A)	0 - 2

1890 - 1891:

Round	Date	Opposition	Score
1Q	4 October 1890	Sheffield United (H)	0 - 1
