= Henry Garden =

Irish footballer (1868–1949)

Personal information
- Full name: Henry Whitworth Garden
- Date of birth: 23 August 1868
- Place of birth: Curragh Camp, Ireland
- Date of death: 1949 (aged 80–81)
- Position: Centre half

Senior career*
Years	Team	Apps	(Gls)
1890–1892	Derby Midland		
1892–1893	Derby County	1	(0)
1893	Long Eaton Rangers		
- * Club domestic league appearances and goals

Henry Whitworth Garden (23 August 1868 – 1949) was an Irish footballer who played in the Football League for Derby County. His only game for Derby came on the opening day of the 1892–93 season, a 3–1 victory against Stoke.

Garden scored one goal in the FA Cup, for Derby Midland in its 3–0 win over Nottingham Forest in the 1889–90 FA Cup first round.
