= Gateshead Association F.C. =

Gateshead Association
- Full name: Gateshead Association F.C.
- Founded: 1884
- Dissolved: 1890
- Ground: Burt Terrace
Home colours

Gateshead Association F.C. was an English association club based in Gateshead, then in County Durham. The Association was part of the club's name and the media referred to it as Gateshead Association or Gateshead (A).

== History ==
The club was founded in 1884 by a Dr A. Dougall, who acted as club secretary until 1888. The first recorded match was at home to St Andrews, and ended in an 8–0 win.

The club entered the local competition, the Durham Cup, for the first time in 1885. The club never got beyond the second round; in 1886–87 it was unlucky to be drawn against Sunderland in the second round and only lost 3–2. The club also reached the second round in the following two seasons.

Tragedy struck the club in 1887. One of its players, Watson, went missing following a game at Houghton-le-Spring in November 1886. The club and players offered a substantial reward, but his body was found in a pond near Washington in February.

Despite an unimpressive local record, the club entered the FA Cup in 1887–88. The club was drawn to play Darlington away and was never in the game, going down by three goals to nil, a fourth goal being deemed to have been scored after the 90 minutes expired.

In February 1888, Dr Dougall announced his departure from the club, and following an emergency meeting one of the club's regular players, Thomas Pyke, took on correspondence duties. The club managed to arrange a friendly with East End, who would ultimately become Newcastle United, early in the 1888–89 season. However, the club's momentum (such as it was) had gone, and it did not enter the 1888–89 FA Cup qualifying rounds. The club's final match appears to have been a 3–0 defeat to Hurworth in the first round of the Durham Cup in 1889–90, as, by the start of the 1890–91 season, the club is described as the "late" Gateshead Association, with the Gateshead Institute club taking over its ground.

There was an attempted revival of the club in 1891–92, but, despite optimism and a roster of 40 members, nothing was heard of the club after the end of the season.

== Colours ==
The club played in white and blue.

== Ground ==
The club's first ground was at Burt Terrace in Bensham.
