= Lennox F.C. =

Lennox F.C. may refer to:

- Lennox Football Club, a rugby union club from England in the late 19th/early 20th century
- Lennox F.C. (Scotland), an association football club from Dumbarton, active in the 19th century
- Lennox F.C., an association football club from London, which merged into Dulwich F.C. in 1884
