= Netherfield F.C. (1885) =

Association football club in England

Netherfield
- Founded: 1885
- Dissolved: 1891
- Ground: Colwick
- Secretary: G. S. Christie

Netherfield Football Club was an association football club from Nottingham, England.

== History ==
The first recorded reference to the club is from 1885, and it was admitted to the Nottinghamshire Football Association for the 1886–87 season. The club reached the semi-final of the Nottinghamshire Junior Cup in 1887–88, losing 1–0 to Stanton Hill in Mansfield.

Off the back of this minor success, the club joined the Football Association for the 1888–89 season, and entered the 1888–89 FA Cup qualifying rounds. The club drew a bye in the first round, but scratched to Cleethorpes in the second.

The club's pretensions to senior status were laid bare the following month, when hammered 5–0 at Grantham Rovers in the Newark Cup; the sobering effect of this was that the club did not enter any of the local competitions in 1889–90. The last record of the club is an 8–1 defeat at the original Mansfield Town in the Mansfield Charity Cup in March 1891.

== Ground ==
The club's ground was in the village of Colwick.
