= Thorpe F.C. =

Thorpe
- Full name: Thorpe Football Club
- Nickname: the Villagers
- Founded: 1882
- Dissolved: 1893
- Ground: School Lane
- Secretary: W. S. Barker
to 1888 colours	from 1888 colours

Thorpe F.C. was a football club from Thorpe Hamlet in Norwich, active in the 19th century.

== History ==
The club was founded in 1882.

In 1887, Thorpe gained the services of Walter Hansell, who had won the FA Cup with the Old Carthusians in 1881, who promptly became captain, and scored 20 goals in his first season with the club, in which it reached the Norfolk Senior Cup final for the first time. Thorpe however lost the final to Wymondham Town. The club reached the final again in 1890, but again lost, this time to Lynn Town, hindered by an injury to Rix early in the game.

Thorpe entered the FA Cup for the first time in 1889–90, by which time qualifying rounds had been introduced. The club's first fixture was at Old Harrovians, which meant a chance to play on the Kennington Oval, and Thorpe's 4–2 win was the first for any Norfolk club in the national competition. In the second qualifying round, the club was drawn at home to Royal Arsenal, and the game ended 2–2, despite the sides playing an extra 30 minutes. The draw caused problems for Thorpe; with two players injured and a clashing Norfolk Senior Cup tie, Thorpe ceded the tie. Thorpe had put in a protest that one Arsenal goal came from a corner in which the corner post had been removed but withdrew it for the sake of sportsmanship.

The win over the Harrovians was Thorpe's only win in the competition; its last entry to the Cup was in 1892–93, and the club seemingly disbanded in November 1892, in part because Hansell's work took him to Mexico, when scratching to South Yarmouth in the Norfolk Cup. However the club managed to keep going until 1894–95, the last recorded match of any note being a 4–2 defeat at Norwich C.E.Y.M.S. in the first round of the Senior Cup.

The club disbanded at the end of the season, with locals attempt to revive the club in August solely with Thorpe Village men. Thorpe's players, including captain G. M. Wright, had joined Norwich C.E.Y.M.S.

== Colours ==
The club originally played in navy blue. In 1887 the club changed to cardinal and grey.

== Ground ==
The club first played at Thunder Lane on the outskirts of Norwich. In 1888 it moved to School Lane. The club's Cup tie with Arsenal was played at the Lakenham cricket ground.
