= 1888–89 FA Cup =

Tournament details
- Country: England; Wales; Ireland

Final positions
- Champions: Preston North End (1st title)
- Runners-up: Wolverhampton Wanderers

The 1888–89 FA Cup was the 18th edition of the world's oldest football knockout competition, the Football Association Challenge Cup, or FA Cup.

== Qualifying rounds ==
The new format for the FA Cup saw 22 teams - the four semi-finalists from the previous season (Preston North End, Crewe Alexandra, West Bromwich Albion and Derby Junction) along with eighteen teams invited by the FA - receiving automatic exemption to the first round proper.

The clubs invited did not include Bolton Wanderers, Everton, Notts County and Stoke from the Football League and so those clubs were entered at the first qualifying round stage. Everton withdrew from the competition after being drawn to meet Ulster in Belfast in their first match, while Stoke became the first League club to be eliminated by non-League opponents when they fell to Warwick County at the Victoria Ground also in the first qualifying round. Ultimately only Notts County successfully progressed to the competition proper after Bolton Wanderers lost to Linfield Athletic in Belfast in the third qualifying round.

The nine non-League clubs progressing from the qualifying rounds were Wrexham, Sheffield Heeley, Chatham, Grimsby Town, South Shore, Old Brightonians, Linfield Athletic, Sunderland Albion and Small Heath. Additionally, the twelve non-league clubs receiving exemption to the first round by invitation were Old Westminsters, Witton, Bootle, Swifts, Nottingham Forest, Halliwell, The Wednesday, Birmingham St George's, Walsall Town Swifts, Old Carthusians, Notts Rangers and Long Eaton Rangers.

For information on all matches played from the first qualifying round to the fourth qualifying round, see 1888–89 FA Cup qualifying rounds.

== First round proper ==
| Home club | Score | Away club | Date |
|---|---|---|---|
| Burnley | 4–3 | Old Westminsters | 2 February 1889 |
| Swifts | 3–1 | Wrexham | 2 February 1889 |
| Notts County | 2–0 | Old Brightonians | 2 February 1889 |
| Nottingham Forest | 2–2 | Linfield Athletic | 2 February 1889 |
| Aston Villa | 3–2 | Witton | 2 February 1889 |
| Bootle | 0–3 | Preston North End | 2 February 1889 |
| Accrington | 1–1 | Blackburn Rovers | 2 February 1889 |
| Chatham | 2–1 | South Shore | 2 February 1889 |
| Grimsby Town | 3–1 | Sunderland Albion | 2 February 1889 |
| Crewe Alexandra | 2–2 | Halliwell | 2 February 1889 |
| Wolverhampton Wanderers | 4–3 | Old Carthusians | 2 February 1889 |
| Derby County | 1–0 | Derby Junction | 2 February 1889 |
| Notts Rangers | 1–1 | The Wednesday | 2 February 1889 |
| Birmingham St George's | 3–2 | Long Eaton Rangers | 2 February 1889 |
| Small Heath | 2–3 | West Bromwich Albion | 2 February 1889 |
| Walsall Town Swifts | 5–1 | Sheffield Heeley | 2 February 1889 |

=== Replays ===
| Home club | Score | Away club | Date |
|---|---|---|---|
| Nottingham Forest | Walkover | Linfield Athletic | |
| Blackburn Rovers | 5–0 | Accrington | 9 February 1889 |
| Crewe Alexandra | 1–5 | Halliwell | 9 February 1889 |
| The Wednesday | 3–0 | Notts Rangers | 9 February 1889 |

== Second round proper ==
| Home club | Score | Away club | Date |
|---|---|---|---|
| Blackburn Rovers | Walkover | Swifts | |
| Aston Villa | 5–3 | Derby County | 16 February 1889 |
| The Wednesday | 3–2 | Notts County | 16 February 1889 |
| Chatham | 1–1 | Nottingham Forest | 16 February 1889 |
| Grimsby Town | 0–2 | Preston North End | 16 February 1889 |
| Halliwell | 2–3 | Birmingham St George's | 16 February 1889 |
| Wolverhampton Wanderers | 6–1 | Walsall Town Swifts | 16 February 1889 |
| West Bromwich Albion | 5–1 | Burnley | 16 February 1889 |

=== Replay ===
| Home club | Score | Away club | Date |
|---|---|---|---|
| Nottingham Forest | 2–2 | Chatham | 23 February 1889 |

=== Second replay ===
| | Score | | Date | Venue |
|---|---|---|---|---|
| Chatham | 3–2 | Nottingham Forest | 28 February 1889 | Kennington Oval |

== Third round proper ==
| Home club | Score | Away club | Date |
|---|---|---|---|
| Preston North End | 2–0 | Birmingham St George's | 2 March 1889 |
| Blackburn Rovers | 8–1 | Aston Villa | 2 March 1889 |
| Chatham | 1–10 | West Bromwich Albion | 2 March 1889 |
| Wolverhampton Wanderers | 3–0 | The Wednesday | 2 March 1889 |

== Semi-finals ==
| | Score | | Date | Venue |
|---|---|---|---|---|
| Preston North End | 1–0 | West Bromwich Albion | 16 March 1889 | Bramall Lane, Sheffield |
| Wolverhampton Wanderers | 1–1 | Blackburn Rovers | 16 March 1889 | Alexandra Road, Crewe |

=== Replay ===
| | Score | | Date | Venue |
|---|---|---|---|---|
| Blackburn Rovers | 1–3 | Wolverhampton Wanderers | 23 March 1889 | Alexandra Road, Crewe |

== Final ==
| | Score | | Date | Venue |
|---|---|---|---|---|
| Preston North End | 3–0 | Wolverhampton Wanderers | 30 March 1889 | Kennington Oval |
