= Walter Hansell =

English footballer

Personal information
- Full name: Walter Edward Hansell
- Date of birth: 15 November 1860
- Place of birth: Norwich, Norfolk
- Date of death: 25 May 1935 (aged 74)
- Place of death: Norwich
- Position: Forward

Senior career*
Years	Team	Apps	(Gls)
1879–83	Norfolk & Norwich/Norwich Wanderers		
1880–85	Old Carthusians		
1883–85	Surbiton Wanderers		
1885–87	Norwich Wanderers		
1887–93	Thorpe		
- * Club domestic league appearances and goals

Walter Edward Hansell (15 November 1860 - 25 May 1938) was an association football right-sided forward who won the FA Cup in 1881 playing for the Old Carthusians.

== Family and early life ==
Hansell was the son of a Norwich solicitor, Peter Hansell, and his wife Emily.

He was educated at Aldeburgh School and (from 1873 to 1878) at Charterhouse School, representing the school XI in his final year.

== Sporting career ==
=== Norwich ===
Hansell's devotion to football saw him as one of the founders of a new football club in Norwich, called the Norfolk & Norwich Football Club, to play under both association and rugby codes, in 1879; he was elected honorary secretary for its first season. Unlike most of his Charterhouse contemporaries, he did not go up to Oxford or Cambridge University, so was free to play football for his new club, and was elected captain in 1880.

In 1880–81, he was instrumental in setting up the Norfolk County Association, which instituted a competition, the Norfolk Senior Cup, first played for in 1881–82. Norwich & Norfolk was the first winner, beating Lynn Town 3–1 in the final at the Lakenham ground in Norwich, and Hansell played as centre-forward, with brother Edward scoring one of the goals. In April 1882, the Norfolk & Norwich club changed its name to Norwich Wanderers, because of confusion with the Norfolk County Association, and Hansell retained the captaincy. Wanderers reached the final of the Senior Cup again in 1883, once more playing Lynn Town, but this time the Linnets gained a revenge with a 5–1 victory, three of Lynn's goals coming in the last ten minutes; Hansell played, despite being unwell, and "unfit to be on a football field".

As football in Norfolk was still in a "primitive state", none of the local clubs was a member of the Football Association, so there was no conflict of interest for Hansell to represent his former school's Old Boy club in the FA Cup. In parallel with his Carthusian career, he remained loyal to Norwich Wanderers until its final dissolution in 1887, apart from in 1884 and 1885, when he worked in London and represented the Surbiton Wanderers instead, albeit playing very few matches. When Norwich Wanderers wound up, he joined the Thorpe club, which he captained to Senior Cup final defeats in 1888 and 1890. He continued to play for Thorpe until 1893, and held the post of treasurer to the Norfolk County FA in the 1890s. He was also an active committee member of the Norwich C.E.Y.M.S. club in the 1890s and 1900s. Hansell's legal and football experience came together in good stead as he served on the Football Association council in the late 19th century.

=== Old Carthusians ===
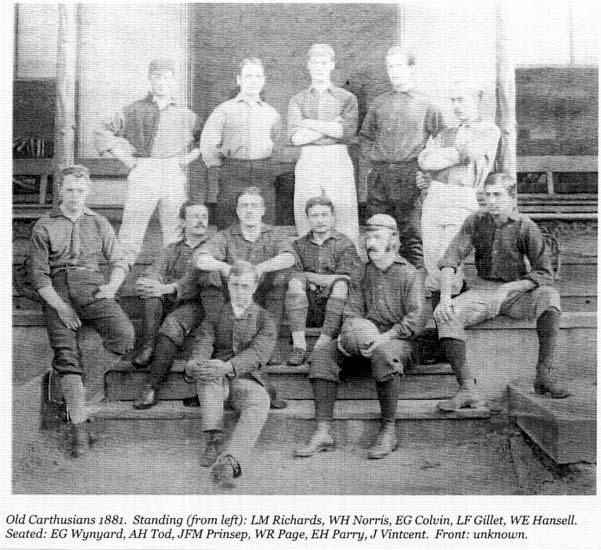
The Old Carthusians FA Cup-winning side of 1881; Hansell is at the top left

Hansell's abilities were demonstrated to Charterhouse's old boys when he was part of the school XI which beat the Old Carthusians in 1878, making one of the goals with an excellent "middle". He also impressed as captain for Norwich & Norfolk against the O.C.s in a friendly in late 1879, played in Cambridge, in which his attacking play was described as "most conspicuous". His reputation grew to the extent that the Carthusians selected him for the first time in the 1880–81 FA Cup quarter-final tie against Clapham Rovers, and he made the crucial third score with a cross that left Page with an empty goal.

Having made his mark in the side, Hansell retained his place for the semi-final against Darwen, and scored one goal, plus struck the post, in the O.C.'s 4–1 win. He was duly selected for the final but did not have much involvement in the match, given the Carthusians had a comparatively easy task in beating the Old Etonians 3–0, and his gold medal was his most treasured possession in the decades afterwards.

Hansell only played once in the Carthusians' defence of the Cup the following season - a defeat to the Royal Engineers, the Carthusians having to field a weakened side - and only played twice in the 1882–83 FA Cup, the distance from Norwich probably being prohibitive to his regularly playing for the Carthusians. Indeed, his second appearance was in the semi-final against Blackburn Olympic in Manchester – the FA had decided one tie would be in the north of England and one in the south, and the draw worked against the Carthusians – and the difficulty in sending a team up to the north was decisive as the O.C.s went down 4–0; Hansell seems to have been a late choice, as he played on the left-wing rather than right, in place of the originally-announced Langer Owen.

Hansell scored his second goal in the competition in the Carthusians' first tie against the Old Foresters in the 1883–84 FA Cup, which put his side 2–1 up, but the Foresters scored six unanswered goals in response to cause a major shock. Hansell played his final match in the competition in the fifth round the following season, scoring in the 3–0 win at Chatham.

=== Representative matches ===
Hansell never gained an international cap, but was one of several reserves for the England match against Ireland in 1883. He also represented his county in representative matches against the Suffolk Association in 1881, against Middlesex and Essex in 1883–84, and in most representative matches from 1886 to 1888.

=== Other sports ===
Hansell was a cricketer of some note, playing for Norfolk twice in 1881.

Hansell was also a keen tennis player, reaching the second round in the Wimbledon Championships men's singles in 1880.

== Post-sporting life ==
Hansell passed his law exams in 1882; and worked as a solicitor in Norwich, after two years of articles in London, until his death at Heigham Hall, Norwich, in 1938. He left just under £10,000 in his will. His son, Ernest George Hansell, became a parliamentarian in Canada.

== Honours ==
- FA Cup
  - Winner: 1881
- Norwich Senior Cup
  - Winner: 1882
  - Runner-up: 1883, 1888, 1890
