= East Sheen F.C. =

East Sheen
- Full name: East Sheen Football Club
- Nickname: the Sheenites
- Founded: 1873 (rugby); 1882 (football)
- Dissolved: 1906
- Ground: St Margarets
Home colours

East Sheen Football Club was an English football and rugby club from Surrey in England.

== History ==
The first reference to an East Sheen Football Club is from 1873, as an offshoot of the East Sheen Cricket Club. It however played under rugby union rules. The club added an association football side in 1882, perhaps due to the influence of rugby captain R. R. H. Lockhart-Bruce, who also played association for Dorking, who also captained the association side in its first seasons, and who was stroke for the East Sheen Boat Club eights.

Its first reported matches under the association code were in the first Surrey Senior Cup in 1882; indeed the club reached the final, where it lost 2–0 at Reigate Priory - the Sheenites had been handicapped by losing A. M. Walters and T. W. Blenkiron before the match as the Charterhouse School headmaster refused to allow them leave to play, and the club had to find substitutes "on the ground". The two clubs met again in the 1884–85 final, East Sheen's second and last appearance, at the Kennington Oval, but this time East Sheen carried off the trophy, two first-half goals from captain Barter helping the side to a 2–1 win.

One notable fixture was in the first round of the Surrey Cup in 1887–88. The club had originally lost to Barnes F.C., but put in a protest, on the basis that darkness had ended the match early, which the Surrey Football Association upheld. The replayed match saw only eight Barnes players turn up to face only ten from East Sheen; despite this, Barnes won by ten goals to nil. The club had been handicapped by the emigration and retirement of a number of players, leaving the club denuded of backs and half-backs.

The Sheenites finally entered the national Cup in 1887–88, and were drawn away at Old St Mark's. The club was one goal behind at half-time, but conceded four in the second half, to go out by seven goals to two. It did not enter the competition again, nor did it enter the FA Amateur Cup.

The club's last rugby match seems to have taken place in 1898, a defeat by five goals and two tries to Oxford University R.F.C.

By 1904 the club was sometimes struggling to raise a team, and before the start of the 1905–06 season, the club was left without a ground. Given the club had long been struggling for crowds, it seems to have dissolved at the end of the season.

In March 2026, a club of the same name was founded by American Matthew Evans.

== Grounds ==
The club's home matches were originally played on Sheen Common, three-quarters of a mile from Mortlake railway station or at a field in Barnes. By 1886 the club had its own enclosed ground in East Sheen, and in 1898 the club was playing at Mortlake. From 1900 until 1905 it played at the St Margaret's ground, which was notorious for its lack of facilities, with no stands and a pavilion with obstructed views.

== Colours ==
The earliest recorded colours for the club are narrow blue and white hooped shirts, white knickers, and scarlet stockings, in 1876–77. By 1886 the club was wearing red and green, and by 1888 light and dark blue, probably in halves as that was a popular combination.

== Notable players ==
Future England backs A.M. and P.M. Walters both played for the club in the 1883–84 and 1884–85 seasons (and in the 1885 Surrey Senior Cup final), and gaining representative honours by playing in the South v North match that year while with the club.

== Honours ==
FA Cup:

- Best performance: 1st round, 1887–88

London Senior Cup:

- Best performance: 2nd round, 1899–1900

Surrey Senior Cup:

- Winners: 1884–85
- Runners-up: 1882–83
