= Lyndhurst F.C. =

Football club in Camberwell, England

- Full name: Lyndhurst Football Club
- Founded: 1883
- Dissolved: 1893
- Ground: Dernmark Hill
- Secretary: J. F. Smith
Home colours

Lyndhurst F.C. was an English association football club from Camberwell in south London, and was the first opponent of Arsenal in the FA Cup.

== History ==
The club was founded in 1883. The club's first tournament of note was the London Senior Cup, entering from 1883 to 1889 and reaching the third round (last 16) in 1885–86.

=== Surrey Senior Cup ===
The club had some success in the Surrey Senior Cup, reaching the quarter-finals in 1886–87 and winning the competition in 1887–88, in unusual circumstances. The club was given a walkover by St Thomas' Hospital in the first round and beat the Rangers club 7–0 in the second. In the third round the club won at Dorking 3–0, before a "shockingly poor crowd", and was due to return to Dorking's Pixham Lane ground for the semi-final against Reigate Priory, who had reached the final of every Cup tournament to date.

However the Priory refused to play at Dorking because of previous crowd trouble there, and proposed playing at another venue. By the time, the Priory had made its protest, the Surrey Football Association had already printed and distributed the posters, so turned down the protest. Reigate therefore scratched, but, instead of giving Lyndhurst a bye into the final, the Surrey FA re-instated Reigate's quarter-final opponents - the association club of Guy's Hospital – and the hospital won 2–0.

Lyndhurst in turn protested, on the basis that the rules of the Surrey FA did not allow this. The Surrey FA committee upheld the protest 4–3 (notably the Lyndhurst club secretary, Dr. Stevenson, was allowed to vote on the protest) and Lyndhurst was duly given the bye into the final.

The final was played at Walton, against Barnes, and ended 1–1; Lyndhurst refused to play extra-time. and the Surrey FA arranged a replay for 28 April. However, the Barnes side was mostly made up of stock exchange members from Middlesex (which had led to protests about their eligibility to play) and could not get a side together. Barnes proposed the trophy be shared, but "after a considerable debate" the Surrey FA awarded the trophy to Lyndhurst.

The club reached the final again the following year, playing Guy's Hospital, and the game again ending 1–1 after 90 minutes. This time Lyndhurst agreed to the extra-time period, but lost their left-winger Spurling who had to catch the train; against ten men, Guy's scored a winner in the 30 minute period.

=== FA Cup ===
The club first entered the FA Cup in 1886–87, losing 4–2 at Chesham in the first round, taking the lead before Chesham scored three unanswered goals before half-time.

The next year was the last in which clubs had automatic entry rights to the first round, and the club was drawn to play the Crusaders from Brentwood away; Lyndhurst went down 9–0, four of the goals going to winger Green-Price.

The club did enter after qualifying rounds were brought in, but lost to Chesham again in the first qualifying round in 1888–89. In 1889–90, the club was originally given a bye from the first qualifying round, but, due to an error at the draw, four clubs were omitted, and one of them – Royal Arsenal – was re-drawn to play Lyndhurst. The future Gunners duly won 11–0 and Lyndhurst did not enter the FA Cup again.

=== End of the club ===
The club disbanded at the end of the 1892–93 season, with players joining the Anerley amateur club.

== Colours ==
The club played in scarlet and white stripes.

== Ground ==
The club gave its home ground as Champion Hill or (more usually) Denmark Hill, which probably refers to Ruskin Park, as the club's facilities were at the Fox on the Hill public house next to the park.

== Honours ==
- Surrey Senior Cup
  - Winners: 1887–88
  - Runners-up: 1888–89
