= Derbyshire Senior Cup =

Derbyshire County FA Senior Cup
- Organiser(s): Derbyshire County FA
- Founded: 1883; 143 years ago
- Region: Derbyshire
- Teams: Varies
- Current champions: Ilkeston Town (1st title)
- Most championships: Buxton (12 titles)
- Website: Derbyshire County FA

The Derbyshire County FA Senior Cup is a local county football cup for teams based in the county of Derbyshire. Founded in 1883–1884, the first competition was won by Staveley, who beat Derby Midland 2–1 in the final. 1885–1886 saw Heeley from Yorkshire win the competition.

It was not until 1892 that the county's top club Derby County first won the trophy. This delay was partially helped by a disagreement during Derby County's first season 1884–1885. After beating Derby St. Luke's and Wirksworth, Derby County were drawn at home to Long Eaton Rangers in the third round. The club applied for a week's delay in playing the fixture, however Long Eaton Rangers claimed the tie stating that they weren't aware of any change in date and had arrived on the set date to play. A correspondent of the 'Derby Daily Telegraph' wrote that the referee had arrived to take charge on the re-arranged date. The Derbyshire County FA awarded the tie to Long Eaton Rangers and the following season Derby County played in the Birmingham and District FA Senior Cup and set up their own Charity Cup. Players also boycotted playing for the County FA team in protest. It wasn't until 1887–1888 that Derby County next played in their own county's competition, where again in the third round they were drawn to play Long Eaton Rangers who won the tie 4–1.

Due to low attendances and receipts the Derbyshire County FA decided to change the cup to a League format in the hope that more games would increase their revenue and invited 14 teams to take part for the 1893–1894 season. This lasted one season.

Its final was traditionally held at Derby County's Baseball Ground on Easter Monday evening during the 1950s and 1960s but became a two-legged affair from season 1966–67 onwards. It reverted to a single leg tie at a neutral venue for season 2008–09.

In the 2010–11 competition, Derbyshire's two professional club's, Derby County and Chesterfield returned to the competition after a 25-year absence, after declining to take part in their traditional Derbyshire FA Centenary Cup pre-season competition. Their return was greeted with disappointment by some fans, who saw it as reducing a competition enjoyed by non-league football followers to a "farce" as the far-superior league sides would breeze through their opponents. The fear proved well-founded as Derby County's reserve team scored 24 goals in their four games and conceded only 4 (3 of which came from fellow professional club Chesterfield in the Quarter Final) culminating in a 5–0 rout of Buxton in the final on 20 April 2011. In the following season Buxton gained revenge over Derby County, beating them 1–0 in the final, which was held at Chesterfield's B2net Stadium on 25 April 2012, through a Mark Reed goal.

The current champions are Ilkeston Town, who won the 2025-26 competition, winning the competition for the 1st time.

== Winners ==
=== Key ===
Match went to a replay
Match went to extra time
Match decided by a penalty shootout after extra time
Shared trophy
League format

1883–1892
Season	Winners	Result	Runner-up	Notes
1883–84	Staveley	2–1	Derby Midland	
1884–85	Staveley	2–0	Derby Midland	
1885–86	Heeley	1–0	Staveley	
1886–87	Staveley	2–0	Long Eaton Rangers	
1887–88	Derby Junction	2–0	Staveley	
1888–89	Staveley	1–0	Derby Junction	
1889–90	Derby Midland	3–1	Long Eaton Rangers	
1890–91	Long Eaton Rangers	2–1	Derby Midland	
1891–92	Derby County	5–0	Long Eaton Rangers	
1892–93	Heanor Town	7–2	Ilkeston Town (1880s)	
1893–1894 (A League)
Season	Winners	Matches	Goals	Points & GD
1893–94	Heanor Town	W:22 D:1 L:3	GF:143 GA:27	Pts:45 GD:+116
1894–1945
Season	Winners	Result	Runner-up	Notes
1894–95	Ilkeston Town (1880s)	3–0	Blackwell	
1895–96	Ilkeston Town (1880s)	2–1	Blackwell	Replay. First match ended 0–0.
1938–39	Buxton			
1945–present
Season	Winners	Result	Runner-up	Notes
1945–46	Buxton			
1946–47	Heanor Athletic			
1947–48	Derby Corinthians			
1948–49	Ilkeston Town			
1949–50	South Normanton Miners Welfare			
1950–51	Shirebrook Miners Welfare			
1951–52	Derby County 'A'			
1952–53	Ilkeston Town			
1953–54	Shirebrook Miners Welfare			
1954–55	Shirebrook Miners Welfare			
1955–56	Ilkeston Town			
1956–57	Buxton			
1957–58	Ilkeston Town			
1958–59	Belper Town			
1959–60	Buxton			
1960–61	Alfreton Town			
1961–62	Belper Town			
1962–63	Ilkeston Town			
1963–64	Belper Town			
1964–65	Long Eaton United			
1965–66	Heanor Town			
1966–67	Heanor Town			
1967–68	Heanor Town			
1968–69	Heanor Town			
1969–70	Alfreton Town			
1970–71	Heanor Town			
1971–72	Buxton			
1972–73	Alfreton Town			
1973–74	Alfreton Town			
1974–75	Matlock Town			
1975–76	Long Eaton United			
1976–77	Matlock Town			
1977–78	Matlock Town			
1978–79	Heanor Town			
1979–80	Belper Town			
1980–81	Buxton			
1981–82	Alfreton Town			
1982–83	Ilkeston Town			
1983–84	Matlock Town			
1984–85	Matlock Town			
1985–86	Buxton			
1986–87	Buxton	5–2	Belper Town	1st Leg: 2–1, 2nd Leg: 3–1, Agg: 5–2
1987–88	Gresley Rovers	1–1	Alfreton Town	1st Leg: 1–0, 2nd Leg: 0–1, Agg: 1–1. Gresley won 4–2 on penalties.
1988–89	Gresley Rovers	2–1	Stapenhill	1st Leg: 0–1, 2nd Leg: 2–0, Agg: 2–1
1989–90	Gresley Rovers			
1990–91	Gresley Rovers	7–1	Borrowash Victoria	Agg: 7–1
1991–92	Matlock Town	3–1	Stapenhill	
1992–93	Ilkeston Town	1–1	Alfreton Town	Ilkeston Town won 7–6 on penalties.
1993–94	Gresley Rovers			
1994–95	Alfreton Town	8–1	Ilkeston Town	1st Leg: 5–0, 2nd Leg: 3–1, Agg: 8–1
1995–96	Gresley Rovers	2–1	Belper Town	1st Leg: 0–0, 2nd Leg: 2–1, Agg: 2–1
1996–97	Gresley Rovers			
1997–98	Glapwell	3–3	Matlock Town	1st Leg: 1–2, 2nd Leg: 2–1, Agg: 3–3. Glapwell won 3–2 on penalties.
1998–99	Ilkeston Town			
1999–00	Ilkeston Town	4–0	Gresley Rovers	1st Leg: 1–0, 2nd Leg: 3–0, Agg: 4–0
2000–01	Glossop North End	5–5	Glapwell	1st Leg: 3–3, 2nd Leg: 2–2, Agg: 5–5. Glossop won 4–2 on penalties.
2001–02	Alfreton Town	5–4	Gresley Rovers	1st Leg: 2–2, 2nd Leg: 3–2, Agg: 5–4
2002–03	Alfreton Town	7–1	Mickleover Sports	1st Leg: 5–0, 2nd Leg: 2–1, Agg: 7–1
2003–04	Matlock	4–1	Ilkeston Town	1st Leg: 3–0, 2nd Leg: 1–1, Agg: 4–1
2004–05	Gresley Rovers	7–1	Belper Town	1st Leg: 5–1, 2nd Leg: 2–0, Agg: 7–1
2005–06	Ilkeston Town	2–1	Mickleover Sports	1st Leg: 1–1, 2nd Leg: 1–0, Agg: 2–1
2006–07	Ilkeston Town	3–2	Matlock Town	1st Leg: 2–1, 2nd Leg: 1–1, Agg: 3–2
2007–08	Belper Town	4–3	Alfreton Town	1st Leg: 3–2, 2nd Leg: 1–1, Agg: 4–3
2008–09	Buxton	1–0	Matlock Town	
2009–10	Matlock Town	2–0	Buxton	
2010–11	Derby County XI	5–0	Buxton	
2011–12	Buxton	1-0	Derby County	
2012–13	Ilkeston	2-1	Matlock Town F.C.	
2013–14	Ilkeston	2–0	Glossop North End	
2014–15	Matlock Town	7–0	Gresley Rovers	
2015–16	Alfreton Town	0–0	Belper Town	Alfreton Town won on penalties.
2016–17	Matlock Town	5–0	Gresley Rovers	
2017–18	Chesterfield reserves	1–0	Alfreton Town	
2018–19	Alfreton Town	2–1	Mickleover	
2019–20	Competition abandoned due to COVID-19 pandemic. Belper Town and South Normanton Athletic were in the finals.			
2020–21	Competition not held due to COVID-19 pandemic.			
2021–22	Competition not held due to COVID-19 pandemic.			
2022–23	Buxton	2–1	Derby County reserves	
2023–24	Buxton	5–0	Heanor Town	
2024–25	Alfreton Town	0-0	Buxton	Alfreton Town won on penalties.
2025–26	Ilkeston Town	2-2	Glossop North End	Ilkeston Town won on penalties.

=== Wins by teams ===
Club	Wins	First final won	Last final won	Notes
Buxton	12	1938–39	2023–34	
Ilkeston Town †	11	1948–49	2006–07	Dissolved in 2010.
Alfreton Town	11	1960–61	2024-25	
Matlock Town	10	1974–75	2016–17	
Gresley Rovers	8	1987–88	2004–05	
Heanor Town	8	1892–93	1978–79	
Belper Town	5	1858–59	2007–08	
Staveley †	4	1883–84	1888–89	Dissolved in 1892.
Derby County	3	1891–92	2010–11	Won 1 title as Derby County A and 1 title as Derby County XI.
Ilkeston †	2	2012–13	2013–14	Dissolved in 2017.
Ilkeston Town (1880s) †	2	1984–95	1895–96	Dissolved in 1903.
Long Eaton United	2	1964–65	1975–76	
Chesterfield reserves	1	2017–18	2017–18	
Derby Corinthians †	1	1947–48	1947–48	Dissolved in 2002.
Derby Junction †	1	1887–88	1887–88	Dissolved in 1895.
Derby Midland †	1	1889–90	1889–90	Dissolved in 1891.
Glapwell	1	1997–98	1997–98	
Glossop North End	1	2000–01	2000–01	
Heanor Athletic †	1	1946–47	1946–47	Dissolved in 2013.
Heeley	1	1885–86	1885–86	
Ilkeston Town (2017)	1	2025–26	2025–26	
Long Eaton Rangers †	1	1885–86	1885–86	Dissolved in 1899.
South Normanton Miners Welfare †	1	1949–50	1949–50	Dissolved in 2022.
