= Chester St Oswalds F.C. =

English football club

Chester St Oswalds
- Full name: Chester St Oswalds Football Club
- Nickname: Saints
- Founded: 1883
- Dissolved: 26 January 1892
- Ground: Exton Park, Chester
Home colours

Chester St Oswalds F.C. were a football club based in Chester, England.

== History ==
The club was formed by Mr L Bebbington as some point in 1883. It entered the FA Cup for the first time in 1887–88, which was the last year before the introduction of qualifying rounds. The club was drawn to visit Chirk in the first round, and Cross gave the Saints the lead, but Chirk came back to win 4–1.

It also entered the Welsh Cup in 1887–88 and 1888–89, losing both of its ties; it did get through to the second round in 1888–89 after Crewe Athletic scratched from its first round tie on turning up at Chester, so the tie was played as a friendly, the Saints winning 5–1.

A Special General Meeting in July 1887 lists the club captain as John Thompson, with vice captain Tom Pixton, and Mr Bennion as reserve captain. Prior to this John Boardman had been captain for two seasons. In 1889 Francis Jayne the Bishop of Chester became patron of the club and contributed towards it financially, but on the basis that the club would fight against the evils of professionalism.

Its best run in the qualifying rounds came in 1889–90, losing 3–0 against Chester FC in the third. Its stance against professionalism proved disastrous as, without attractive opponents, the club ran out of money, and was dissolved on 26 January 1892 due to financial difficulties.

The St Oswalds name was revived in June 1898 when Chester P.S.A. changed their name.

== Colours ==
The club adopted white and blue vertical stripes in July 1887.

== Ground ==
The club originally played on the Roodee, but moved to Exton Park in Parkgate Road in July 1887. The club lost the use of the ground at the end of the 1887–88 season, but quickly found a new one on the same site before the start of the next.

== League history ==
Season	League								
Season	Division	P	W	D	L	F	A	Pts	Pos
1898-99	West Cheshire League Division 1	20	4	4	12	34	58	12	10

== Cup history ==
Season	Competition	Round	Opposition	Score
1887-88	FA Cup	1R	Chirk	1-4
1888-89	FA Cup	1QR	Over Wanderers	5-1
1888-89	Welsh Cup	1R	Crewe Athletic	5-1
1888-89	Welsh Cup	2R	Northwich Victoria	1-2
1888-89	Cheshire Cup	SF	Crewe Alexandra	1-4
1889-90	FA Cup	1QR	Druids	4-0
1889-90	FA Cup	2QR	Shrewsbury Town	6-1
1889-90	FA Cup	3QR	Chester	0-3
1890-91	FA Cup	1QR	Chester	0-6
1891-92	FA Cup	1QR	Nantwich	0-3

== Honours ==
- Chester Charity Cup
  - Winners (1): 1891

== Notable players ==
- Charlie Parry - Wales International, later played for Everton.
