= Peter Andrews (footballer) =

Scottish footballer

Peter Andrews (10 November 1845 – 24 July 1916) was a Scottish footballer, who played for Callander, Glasgow Eastern, Sheffield Heeley and Scotland. It is thought that Andrews was the first Scottish player to move to England to play football, although he moved for reasons of work rather than football itself as professionalism had not yet been established. Andrews played once for a Sheffield representative team against Manchester, and for both teams in the Sheffield v Glasgow series.
