= 1889–90 FA Cup =

Football tournament

Tournament details
- Country: England; Wales; Ireland

Final positions
- Champions: Blackburn Rovers (4th title)
- Runners-up: The Wednesday

The 1889–90 FA Cup was the 19th season of the world's oldest football knockout competition, the Football Association Challenge Cup, or the FA Cup. Blackburn Rovers won the competition for the fourth time, beating The Wednesday 6–1 in the final at Kennington Oval. The match total of seven goals remains the record (equalled in the 1953 final) for the highest number of goals scored in an FA Cup final. Blackburn's own score of six goals remains the record (equalled by Bury in 1903 and by Manchester City in 2019) for the most by one team in an FA Cup final.

== Qualifying rounds ==
This season's competition saw all Football League clubs granted exemption through to the first round proper. The 10 non-League clubs progressing from the qualifying rounds were Chester, South Shore, Sheffield United, Derby Midland, Lincoln City, Distillery, Newcastle West End, Small Heath, Swifts and Clapton. South Shore and Small Heath had come through the qualifying rounds of the previous season's competition but, of the others, only Sheffield United was featuring at this stage for the first time. Newcastle West End was appearing in the first round for the last time before folding and being absorbed into Newcastle United in 1892.

Distillery's heavy loss to Bolton Wanderers at Pike's Lane also marked the final appearance by an Irish team in the FA Cup competition proper.

In order to bring the number of teams up to 32, a further 10 non-League clubs were given byes to the first round. These were Newton Heath, Old Westminsters, Sunderland, The Wednesday, Sunderland Albion, Bootle, Old Carthusians, Nottingham Forest, Grimsby Town and Birmingham St George's.

For information on all matches played from the first round qualifying to the fourth round qualifying, see 1889–90 FA Cup qualifying rounds.

== First round proper ==
Home club	Score	Away club	Date
Preston North End	6–1	Newton Heath	18 January 1890
Stoke	3–0	Old Westminsters	18 January 1890
Blackburn Rovers	4–2	Sunderland	18 January 1890
The Wednesday	6–1	Swifts	18 January 1890
Bootle	1–3 Sunderland Albion disqualified	Sunderland Albion	18 January 1890
Bolton Wanderers	10–2	Distillery	18 January 1890
Accrington	3–1 Match void	West Bromwich Albion	18 January 1890
South Shore	2–4	Aston Villa	18 January 1890
Wolverhampton Wanderers	2–0	Old Carthusians	18 January 1890
Derby Midland	3–0	Nottingham Forest	18 January 1890
Lincoln City	2–0	Chester	18 January 1890
Everton	11–2	Derby County	18 January 1890
Newcastle West End	1–2	Grimsby Town	18 January 1890
Birmingham St George's	4–4	Notts County	18 January 1890
Small Heath	3–1	Clapton	18 January 1890
Sheffield United	2–1	Burnley	18 January 1890

=== Replays ===
Home club	Score	Away club	Date
Accrington	3–0	West Bromwich Albion	25 January 1890
Notts County	6–2	Birmingham St George's	25 January 1890

== Second round proper ==
Home club	Score	Away club	Date
Preston North End	4–0	Lincoln City	1 February 1890
Stoke	4–2	Everton	1 February 1890
Notts County	4–1	Aston Villa	1 February 1890
Blackburn Rovers	3–0	Grimsby Town	1 February 1890
The Wednesday	2–1	Accrington	1 February 1890
Bootle	2–1	Derby Midland	1 February 1890
Bolton Wanderers	13–0	Sheffield United	1 February 1890
Wolverhampton Wanderers	2–1	Small Heath	1 February 1890

== Third round proper ==
Home club	Score	Away club	Date
Preston North End	2–3	Bolton Wanderers	15 February 1890
The Wednesday	5–0 Match void	Notts County	15 February 1890
Bootle	0–7	Blackburn Rovers	15 February 1890
Wolverhampton Wanderers	4–0 Match void	Stoke	15 February 1890

=== Replays ===
Home club	Score	Away club	Date
The Wednesday	2–3 Match void	Notts County	22 February 1890
The Wednesday	2–1	Notts County	3 March 1890
Wolverhampton Wanderers	8–0	Stoke	22 February 1890

== Semi-finals ==
	Score		Date	Venue
Blackburn Rovers	1–0	Wolverhampton Wanderers	8 March 1890	Kennington Oval
The Wednesday	2–1	Bolton Wanderers	8 March 1890	

== Final ==
Home club	Score	Away club	Date
Blackburn Rovers	6–1	The Wednesday	29 March 1890
