= Lincoln Ramblers F.C. =

Lincoln Ramblers
- Full name: Lincoln Ramblers Football Club
- Nickname: the Ramblers
- Founded: 1878
- Dissolved: 1891
- Ground: Cowpaddle
- Secretary: (to 1887) W. Cotton, (1887) F. Treavitt, (1888) C. Barin
Home colours

Lincoln Ramblers Football Club was an English football club from Lincoln.

== History ==
The club was formed 1878 and played local matches only before entering the FA Cup in 1887–88. The Ramblers were drawn at home to Notts County, but agreed to switch the tie to County's Trent Bridge ground. Despite Notts starting with only ten men, the half-time score was 6–0 to County, and the Ramblers conceded three more in the second half.

The club recovered from this defeat to go on its best run in the Lincolnshire Senior Cup in 1888–89, reaching the semi-final, where the club lost 5–0 to Grimsby Town at the John O'Gaunt's ground, despite borrowing

Smith from Gainsborough Trinity and five players from Lincoln City Swifts (the Cits' reserve XI) for the match. The Ramblers' fans did not take kindly to the defeat, pelting the Grimsby players with stones and orange peel, and forcing them to require a police escort back to the club's hotel.

The tie was the club's last competitive match, as the Lincolnshire Football Association suspended the club afterwards for "objectionable conduct" - i.e. the borrowing of the Lincoln City players - until the start of 1890. The players concerned were suspended until August 1889. Only one other match is recorded to the club, at Sleaford Town in February 1891.

== Colours ==
The club's colours were black, with a white sash.

== Ground ==
The club played at the Cowpaddle ground, using the Chaplin Arms as headquarters.
