= Elswick Rangers F.C. =

Elswick Rangers
- Full name: Elswick Rangers F.C.
- Nickname(s): the Rangers
- Founded: 1886?
- Dissolved: 1891
- Ground: Mill Lane
Home colours

Elswick Rangers F.C. was an English association club based in Newcastle-upon-Tyne.

== History ==
The club's foundation date is unclear, but its first recorded match was in September 1886, a 3–1 win at Darlington. The club was however obviously ambitious, having recruited a number of Scots players, such as Tait from Third Lanark, Melville and Beattie from Partick Thistle, and Baxter from Northern. One of the early victims of Rangers was West End, who would merge into Newcastle United within a few years.

The reason the club could afford such players was that the club's patron was the industrialist Lord Armstrong, who could arrange jobs as the Sir William Armstrong, Mitchell and Co. Ltd works at Elswick for decent players.

Towards the end of the 1886–87 season, the club went on tour to Scotland, but made the mistake of going by boat; the resulting mal-de-mer affected the team to the extent that it lost three of the four matches, but drew with St Johnstone. the club finished the season as runners-up in the Northumberland Football Association Charity Shield, losing 2–0 to Shankhouse in the final.

The club entered the FA Cup in 1887–88. The club drew 3–3 at home to Bishop Auckland Church Institute in the first round, and won the replay 2–0, plus having two further goals disallowed. In the second round, at Darlington, the Rangers went 3–0 up inside the first quarter of an hour, but lost 4–3 after extra time.

The club was too small to be invited into the early national leagues, but was a founder member of the Northern League in 1889–90. The club only gained two wins, finished bottom, and was not re-elected. The club stepped down to the lower level Northern Alliance (the re-named North-Eastern League) for 1890–91 but finished fifth out of the seven teams, while struggling to get a team together, regular goalkeeper Matthieson having to play outfield on occasion. The club's ultimate humiliation was in the 1890–91 Northumberland Senior Cup, losing 10–2 to East End; made all the worse because, due to of a clash of fixtures, East End only sent a reserve side.

The last record of the club is its attendance at the Northumberland FA annual general meeting in May 1891. It does not seem to have survived to the 1891–92 season.

== Colours ==
The club wore light blue jerseys.

== Ground ==
The club's ground was Mill Lane.
