= Horncastle Town F.C. =

Football club in Horncastle, England

Horncastle Town
- Full name: Horncastle Town Football Club
- Nicknames: the Wongers; formerly the Gridiron Men
- Founded: 1879
- Ground: The Wong
- Capacity: 1,000
- Chairman: temp
- Manager: John Rawdon
- League: Lincolnshire Football League
- 2024-25: 10th
- Website: www.horncastletownfc.co.uk
Home colours

Horncastle Town F.C. is an English association football club from Horncastle in Lincolnshire.

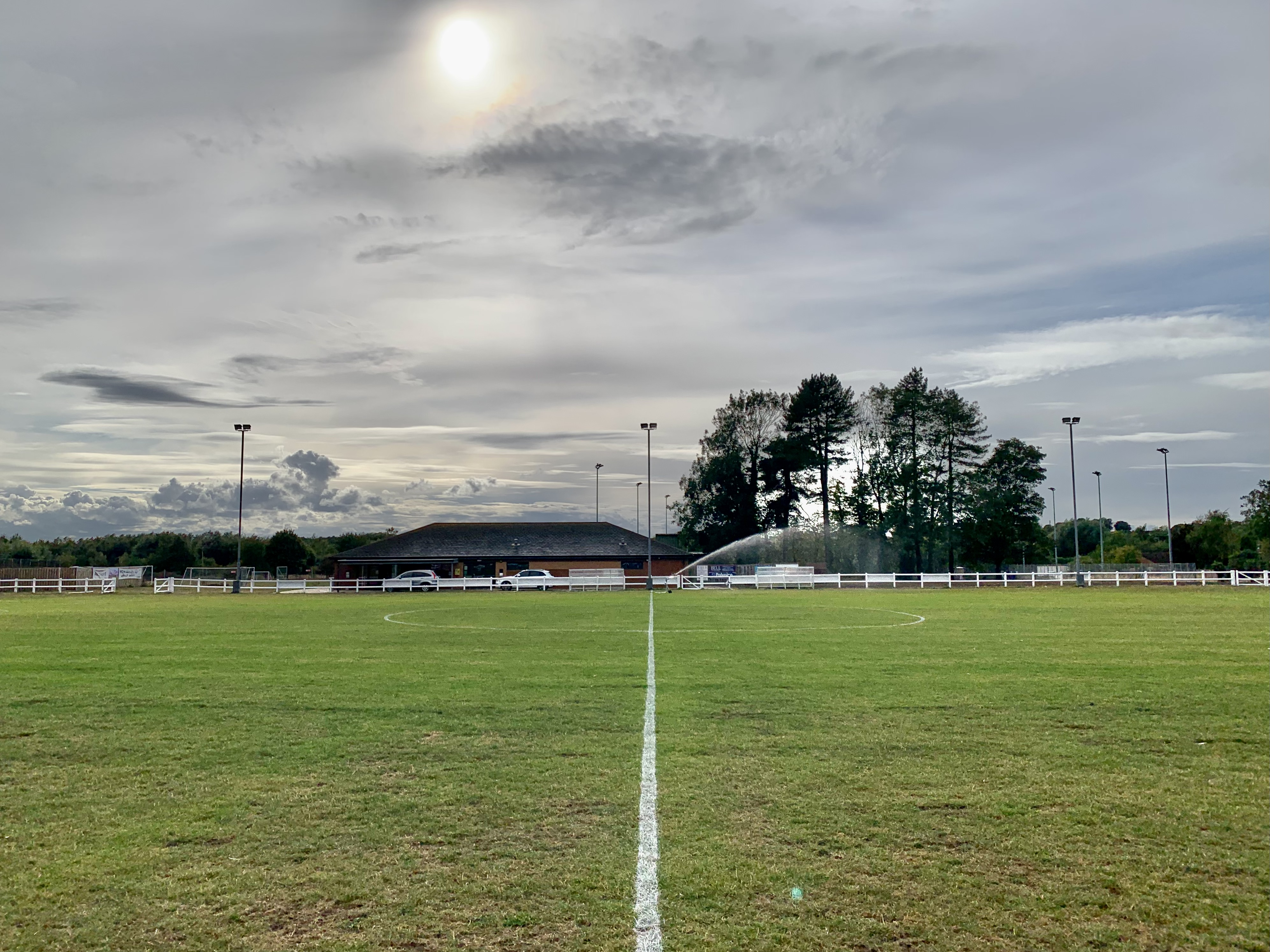
The Wong

== History ==
The first team from the town, called Horncastle, and playing "on the Wong," was founded in 1866 and played in an all-white kit with blue facings, belt, socks, and a gold-tasselled cap. It seems to have become defunct in 1873.

=== FA Cup main rounds ===
The club first entered the FA Cup in 1885–86. The club was drawn to face Middlesbrough in the first round, with Boro having the choice of ground, which they exercised in favour of them having the tie at home. Horncastle suggested playing in Sheffield because of the cost of transport, which Boro refused; Horncastle, therefore, withdrew.

In 1886–87, however, the club went on its best-ever Cup run. In the first round, the club beat Darlington before 2,000 spectators; The Lincolnshire Chronicle stated the match was "the very best‐bar none‐we have ever witnessed on the Wong," whereas the Northern Echo, bemoaning two disallowed Darlington goals and complaining the first Town goal had cleared the bar, stated The game was of a very rough character and did not excite much interest.”

The club got a bye in the second round, beat Grantham Town at home in the third (before 1,500 spectators) and (after another bye) lost away to eventual winner Aston Villa in the fifth (last 16).

The following year was the last in which clubs had automatic entry rights to the first round, and the club was drawn to play Lincoln City away; the match was considered a "foregone conclusion," and the City duly won 4–1.

=== Later history ===
The club did not turn professional and reverted to the minor leagues, its most prominent league success being champions of the Lincoln League in 1979–80. The club had a banner year in 1926–27, winning eight knockout trophies. It has been a constant member of the Lincolnshire League since joining in 1996.

== Colours ==
The town's original colours were cerise and French grey, which were changed in 1886 to Lincoln green with a gridiron badge. In the 1990s, the club changed to the town's corporate colours of red and white.

== Ground ==
The club's ground is The Wong, to the south of the town centre.

== Honours ==
Lincoln League

- Winners: 1979–80

Lincolnshire County Senior B Cup

- Winners: 2004–05

Hotchkin Cup

- Winners: 1979–80, 1980–81, 2024-2025

Willoughby Cup

- Winners: 1949–50
