= Old St Paul's F.C. =

Football club from London, England

Old St Paul's
- Full name: Old St Paul's Football Club
- Nicknames: the Saints, the Old Saints
- Founded: 1885
- Dissolved: 1890
- Ground: Victoria Park/Chobham Farm
- Secretary: Charles Squires
Home colours

Old St Paul's F.C. was an amateur association football club, made up of former pupils of St Paul's School in Hammersmith.

== History ==
The earliest record for the club is from the 1885–86 season.

Its 1886–87 season was particularly successful, with only 1 defeat (to the Old Harrovians) in 19 matches; one of its draws was with Tottenham Hotspur. It also entered a cup competition for the first time, the East End Senior Cup, but it was eliminated from the competition for fielding a player (one C. Taylor), who, despite being a club member, was not eligible for the competition, in its win over the London Caledonians. There was controversy as the Caledonians had said they would not protest so long as they could also field a guest player, who did not turn up.

=== Cannon F.C. ===
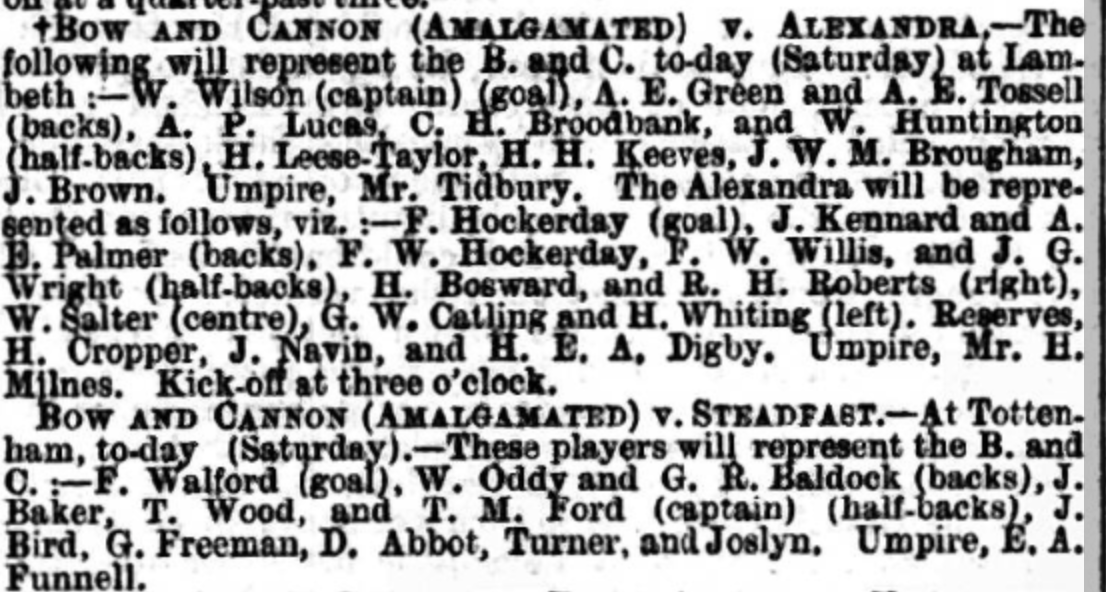
Line-ups for the Bow and Cannon FC 1st and 2nd XIs, Sporting Life, 4 December 1886

However, the club had not entered the 1886–87 FA Cup, and many Old St Paul's members formed a new club - Cannon F.C. - which did enter, and was drawn to host the Old Foresters. Instead of playing the FA Cup fixture, its players turned up at Victoria Park to play Waverley in a London Senior Cup first round replay instead; Cannon had not properly registered with the Football Association, so scratched from the national competition. The London tie was controversial - Cannon claimed the right to choose the ground, even though it had hosted the original tie (which had ended 1–1, Cannon being said to have played a "roughish" game), but Waverley said that the agreement was for the match to be held at Victoria Park, if there were no neutral ground available; the confusion saw five Waverley players turn up at Tottenham instead, and although Cannon claimed a 2–1 win, both of its goals were disallowed, one for "palpable" infringement of the offside law. Waverley was hammered 12–0 in the next round at the Casuals.

The club merged with the Bow F.C. shortly after the clubs played each other in October, and was known as the Bow and Cannon club; under that guise it was a founder member of the East End Football Association in November 1888, and the club's secretary W. R. T. Wilson was a secretary of the new association. By 1887 it was once more known simply as Cannon and won through to the semi-final of the East End Cup, where it met Millwall Athletic, at Minerva's Forest Gate ground; Cannon was edged out 3–2, Horace Keeves and H. Leese scoring the Cannon goals.

=== Taking over Cannon ===
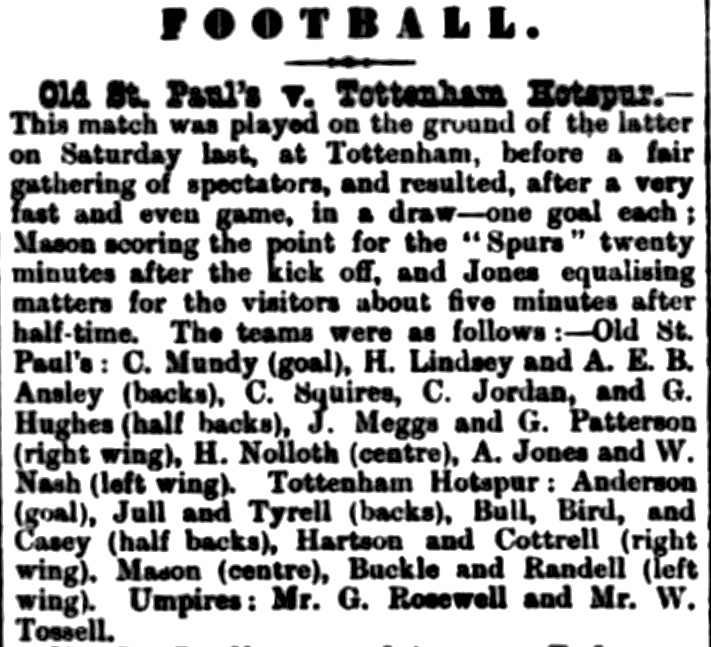
Tottenham Hotspur 1–1 Old St Paul's, East London Observer, 6 November 1886

Before the 1887–88 season, Old St Paul's absorbed the Cannon club. Secretary Wilson had been a regular with Old St Paul's even while Cannon was an extant side, and many of Cannon's 1886–87 players, such as Broodbank, Leese, Keeves, and Huntingdon, are found playing for Old St Paul's in 1887–88.

The boosted club was now a regular entrant to the London Senior Cup, and its best run was to the semi-final in 1888–89, where it lost 3–1 to the Royal Arsenal at Plumstead. The following season, it entered the FA Cup qualifying rounds for the only time. The club nearly reached the competition proper, winning through three rounds (including wins over Reading and Luton Town - the tie at Reading being particularly thrilling, the Old Saints going from 2–0 ahead to 3–2 behind in the 88th minute before equalizing in the 90th, and W. Ingram completing his hat-trick in the mutually-agreed extra-time to win the tie).

At the final qualifying stage, a weakened Saints side lost to its neighbour Clapton. Horace Keeves, by now the regular goalkeeper, was unable to play, but was present as a spectator. Two days later he died of congestion of the lungs.

The club's final competitive football came in the 1889–90 Middlesex Senior Cup, with a semi-final replay defeat to the London Caledonians. At the start of the 1890–91 season, the club amalgamated with the City Ramblers club, taking the Ramblers' name.

== Colours ==
The club wore light blue and black shirts. After the merger with City Ramblers, the club took on the St Paul's school colours of white shirts.

== Ground ==
The club originally played at Victoria Park, an area with several pitches from which to choose and on which several clubs played. By 1887 it was playing at Chobham Farm in Leyton, using the Eagle pub for facilities, in addition to still using available pitches at Victoria Park.

Cannon's ground was at the Park Hotel in Tottenham.
