= Rotherham Town F.C. (1878) =

Former association football club in England

Rotherham Town
- Full name: Rotherham Town Football Club
- Founded: 1878 (as Lunar Rovers)
- Dissolved: 1896
- Ground: Clifton Grove
Home colours

Rotherham Town F.C. was a football club based in Rotherham, England. The club was a member of the Football League between 1893 and 1896.

== History ==
The original club was founded in 1878 as Lunar Rovers, becoming Rotherham in 1882, and eventually Rotherham Town. In 1889 the club became a founder member of the Midland League. They were champions in 1892 and 1893, and were subsequently elected to the Second Division of the Football League in 1893.

The club lost the Wharncliffe Charity Cup in 1889–90 in unusual circumstances; the final with Staveley ended 1–1, and Staveley could not play extra-time because of travel difficulties, so Town was told to walk the ball into the goal to claim the match. Somehow, Town managed to miss and there was nobody to take the subsequent goal-kick. The game was eventually replayed with Staveley winning.

The club's League tenure lasted just three seasons, finishing in 14th, 12th and 15th place (out of 16). At the end of the 1895/96 season they failed to apply for re-election and subsequently folded.

The club played at Clifton Lane and Clifton Grove.

Arthur Wharton, the man widely regarded as the first ever black professional footballer, played for the club from 1889 to 1894. Liverpool Football Club played their first ever fixture against Rotherham Town on 1 September 1892 in a friendly fixture, Liverpool won 7–1, the first ever opponent to score at Anfield was Rotherham striker Charlie Leatherbarrow.

A second Rotherham Town formed in 1899, going on to merge with Rotherham County in 1925 to form Rotherham United.

=== League and cup history ===
Rotherham Town League and Cup history
Season	Division	Position	FA Cup
1883–84			2nd Round
1884–85			1st Round
1885–86			1st Round
1886–87			2nd Round
1887–88			2nd Round
1888–89			2nd qualifying round
1889–90	Midland League	3rd/11	4th qualifying round
1890–91	Midland League	7th/10	4th qualifying round
1891–92	Midland League	1st/11	3rd qualifying round
1892–93	Midland League	1st/13	3rd qualifying round
1893–94	Football League Division 2	14th/15	1st qualifying round
1894–95	Football League Division 2	12th/16	1st qualifying round
1895–96	Football League Division 2	15th/16	4th qualifying round

== Colours ==
As Lunar Rovers, the club played in navy blue and white. From 1882 to 1892 it wore various combinations of chocolate and light blue, and as a League club settled on red jerseys with navy knickers.

== Ground ==
The club's original ground was on Clifton Lane, and in 1891 it moved a short distance to a new ground it called Clifton Grove - indeed the club took its covered seated stand with it from the old to the new ground.

== Honours ==
- Midland League
  - Champions: 1891–92, 1892–93

== Records ==
- Best league performance: 12th, Football League Division 2
- Best FA Cup performance: Second round, 1883–84, 1886–87, 1887–88

== See also ==
- Category:Rotherham Town F.C. (1878) players
