= Heeley F.C. =

Heeley
- Full name: Heeley Football Club
- Founded: 1862
- Dissolved: 1899
- Ground: Meersbrook Park
1862–77 colours	1877–88 colours

Heeley F.C. was an English association football club based in Sheffield, Yorkshire.

== History ==
Heeley was one of the major teams in the area during the 1860s and 70s. The club was founded by attendees of the Christ Church in Heeley, in 1862 and played to the Sheffield rules until the merger with the Football Association in 1877. The club was named after the Sheffield suburb of the same name; until 1870 the club played at Wellsbrook Park before moving to Meersbrook.

Heeley was involved in the formation of the Sheffield Football Association and played in the Youdan Cup. They built a fierce rivalry with The Wednesday, and met them in the first ever final of the Sheffield Challenge Cup at Bramall Lane, losing 3–4 after extra-time. They would go on to lose a further four Challenge Cup finals, but did win the final in 1882, putting five goals past an over-awed Pye Bank in the final. One player, Billy Betts, had impressed Heeley so much that it persuaded Betts to join.

Their best player was Jack Hunter who played seven times for England and captained them once. They also had Peter Andrews, a Scottish International who played against England in 1875. Jack Hudson started his career at Heeley before joining Sheffield and then The Wednesday, and made one appearance for England.

Heeley entered the FA Cup throughout the 1880s, progressing the furthest into the competition with their maiden entry, a run to the fourth round of 1881–82, all achieved without leaving Sheffield: a home tie with Lockwood Brothers followed by short away trips to Sheffield and The Wednesday either side of a third-round bye. In their second attempt, in 1882–83, Heeley progressed to the second round after Grantham scratched only to lose 7–2 to Nottingham Forest. Forest would repeat the trick at the same stage two years on, after Heeley lost to their city rivals–Notts County–in the first round the intervening season. Having ended Eckington Works' involvement in the first round of 1885–86, Heeley's luck against Nottinghamshire clubs continued to elude them, this time Notts Rangers sinking the Sheffielders with a 1–6 away win.

The 1886–87 FA Cup campaign saw them beaten by Grimsby Town in the first round. Their start to the following edition was far better: a 9–0 win over nearby Attercliffe, however another Sheffield side, Owlerton, put Heeley out in round two. The club remained amateur in the face of professionalism, and the 1888–89 FA Cup saw it having to qualify for the first round beating Redcar 6–1, South Bank 2–1, Park Grange 3–1 and finally, revenge against Owlerton 5–1. They lost the first round to Walsall Town Swifts, and would never make the tournament proper again. Their final season in the FA Cup ended in the second qualifying round, losing to Sheffield United, though their final entries saw them withdraw from the 1890–91 and 1891–92 FA Cup qualifying rounds at the first hurdle.

In 1898, a new team from Heeley (Heeley Friends) was founded, and by 1899 it seems to have absorbed Heeley, as there are no further references to the club.

== League and cup history ==
Heeley League and Cup history
Season	Division	Position	FA Cup
1881–82	-	-	4th Round
1882–83	-	-	2nd Round
1883–84	-	-	1st Round
1884–85	-	-	2nd Round
1885–86	-	-	2nd Round
1886–87	-	-	1st Round
1887–88	-	-	2nd Round
1888–89	-	-	1st Round
1889–90	-	-	2nd qualifying round
1890–91	-	-	1st qualifying round
1891–92	Hallamshire League	5th/8	1st qualifying round
1893–94	Hatchard League South	/8	-
1894–95	Hatchard League Division 2	/8	-
1895–96	Sheffield Minor Cup League		-
1896–97	Sheffield Alliance League Division 2	/12	-
1897–98	Sheffield Alliance League	/11	-

== Colours ==
The club's original colours were grey and white hoops. In 1877 the club changed to puce and black hoops with a red cap, from 1879 described as violet and black hoops, the design changed to halves by 1888.

== Honours ==
=== League ===
None

=== Cup ===
- Sheffield & Hallamshire Senior Cup
  - Winners: 1881–82
  - Runners-up: 1876–77, 1878–79, 1879–80, 1883–84, 1885–86
- Sheffield & Hallamshire Minor Cup
  - Runners–up: 1892–93

== Notable players ==
- Jack Hunter, player-trainer of the Blackburn Olympic Cup-winning team, and who earned England caps while a player with Heeley
- Jack Hudson, also capped for England while a Heeley player
- Peter Andrews, Scotland international

== Records ==
- Best FA Cup performance: 4th Round, 1881–82
