= Old Brightonians F.C. =

Old Brightonians
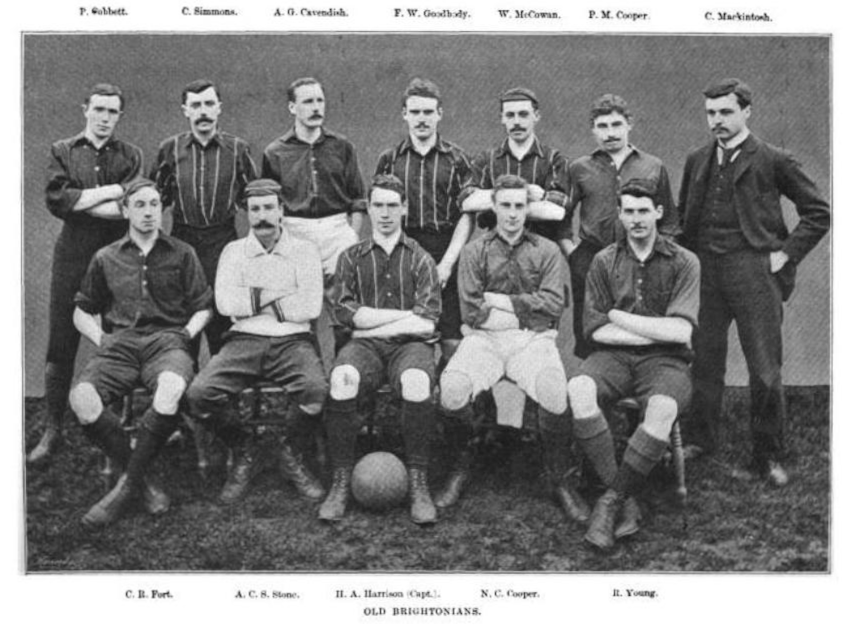
- 1894
- Full name: Old Brightonians Football Club
- Nickname: O.B.s
- Founded: 1881
- Dissolved: 1920
- Ground: Greyhound Ground, Dulwich
Home colours

Old Brightonians were an amateur association football club, based in London, for the former pupils of Brighton College.

== History ==
The club's first entry into the FA Cup, in 1884-85, saw the club defeated in the first round by the Swifts club of Slough, the club not helped by one of their players having to miss the match through illness and having to play with ten men throughout. The club's biggest win in the competition proper was over the Clapham Rovers in 1886-87, a team that had won the cup at the start of the decade, by six goals to nil, away from home. (The club bettered that score in the qualifying rounds in 1891-92, beating Gravesend 8-0 away at the latter's Bat & Ball Ground.) The O.B.s' best run was in 1887-88, reaching the third round and losing to the Old Carthusians.

In 1888-89, the Football Association introduced qualifying rounds, and the Old Brightonians won through four rounds to play in the first round proper, losing 2-0 at Notts County, a Football League club; the O.B.s were considered a little unlucky, the first goal being an own goal and the second coming right at the death. Only one other old boys' club had made it that far.

The difficulties of pure amateurism was demonstrated the next season, when the club withdrew from the Cup at the third qualifying round stage, because some of its best players were needed for the Varsity Match. The closest the club came to making the first round again was in 1891-92, when the club lost to Chatham in the third qualifying round, losing 3-2 amidst controversial circumstances; the referee allowed a Chatham goal that was handled into the goal on the basis that the O.B.s had only appealed for offside, and the Chatham winner coming after goalkeeper Stone stepped back when catching a header by Hobart and the referee ruled he had stepped over the line. Old Brightonians protested the result but, at a Southern Sub-divisional FA Committee meeting four days later, the protest was quickly rejected.

With the advance of professional football, the club's last FA Cup entry was in 1892-93, losing to the Old Westminsters in the first qualifying round. The club retreated to the old boy competitions, and had some success in the Arthur Dunn Cup. The club however only seems to have lasted one season after World War I, although in 1996 a new club was formed, the Old Brightonians Association Football Club.

== Colours ==
The club's colours throughout the 1880s were blue and white, which photographic evidence confirms to have been hoops, originally with a blue and white striped cap. By 1894 the club was wearing claret with blue pinstripes.

== Honours ==
Arthur Dunn Cup: winners 1912-13, runners-up 1906-07

== Notable players ==
Four players were capped by England while registered with the club:

- George Cotterill, who scored for England against Scotland in 1893 while an Old Brightonian
- Leslie Gay
- Claude Wilson, FA Cup runner-up with Oxford University A.F.C. and also a first-class cricketer
- N.C. Cooper, also a first-class cricketer
