= Old St Mark's F.C. =

Old St Mark's
- Full name: Old St Mark's Football Club
- Nickname: the Saints
- Founded: 1885
- Dissolved: 1903
- Ground: The Limes, Barnes
Home colours

Old St Mark's Football Club was a football club based in Barnes, London.

== History ==
The club was formed for old boys of St Mark's College, Chelsea, an educational establishment which lasted from 1841 to a merger in 1923, and which is now known as Plymouth Marjon University.

The club first made a mark in the London Senior Cup of 1885–86, beating the strong Casuals side in the third round, and losing to Hotspur (why by now had moved to Wimbledon) in the quarter-finals. The club reached the same stage every year until 1888–89, in the last year being a victim of the Royal Arsenal side.

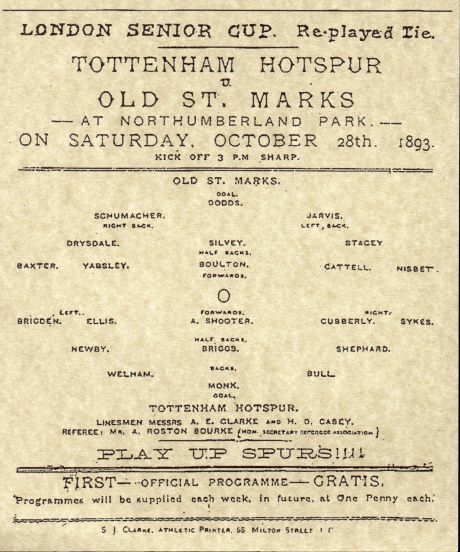
The programme for the London Senior Cup replay with Tottenham Hotspur.

In the same competition, the Saints beat Tottenham Hotspur in the qualifying rounds of 1893–94, by a score of 6–1, in a replay; the match was notable for being the first one for which the Spurs issued a programme. However the club lost by a record score of 18–0 to the Old Westminsters at Wembley Park in the first round proper.

It was an uncharacteristically heavy defeat, the club's next biggest in the competition being a 5–1 defeat to Wandsworth in the club's last match in the competition in 1902–03. It also last played in the FA Amateur Cup that year, going down 10–2 to Croydon Wanderers in the second qualifying round.

=== FA Cup ===
The Saints entered the FA Cup for the first time in 1887–88, beating East Sheen in the first round 7–2 but losing narrowly to the Old Etonians in the second, having twice been ahead. The club entered the qualifying rounds until 1892–93, its final tie being a 4–0 defeat to Luton Town in the first qualifying round in 1892–93.

=== Southern League ===
In 1892–93, a number of clubs proposed to set up a new league for clubs in the south of England. The Saints were one of the applicants, and, at a meeting in London at which the clubs voted on the applications, the club received 15 votes, and were therefore one of the 12 clubs selected for this new Southern League. However, within a month, the club withdrew its application.

== Colours ==
The club played in chocolate and light blue, which was probably in halves, as that was a popular way to combine those colours at the time.

== Ground ==
The club played at the Limes, in Barnes, south-west London.
