= Brentwood F.C. (1877) =

Brentwood F.C., Crusaders F.C.
- Full name: Brentwood Football Club, Crusaders Football Club
- Founded: 1877
- Dissolved: 1896
- Ground: Old Cricket Ground, Brentwood (1877–1886); Essex County Cricket Ground, Leyton (1886–96)
Home colours

Brentwood Football Club was an English football club based in Brentwood, Essex. From 1886 the club was known as Crusaders F.C.

== History ==
The club was founded in September 1877 under the name Brentwood F.C. Within a fortnight of its founding the club had over 40 members.

The club played its first match on 6 October 1877, at Hendon, and opened its ground (provided by vice-president William Burgess), at the corner of Sawyer's Hall Lane and Shenfield Road, one week later, with a match between sides chosen by the club secretary and the club captain. On 20 October 1877, the club had its first win, 6–0 at home to Romford.

The club first entered the FA Cup in 1878–79, losing in the first round to the Pilgrims. The club entered the competition for the next eight seasons under the Brentwood name, reaching the fourth round (last 16) in 1883–84, thanks to a bye in the second round.

In 1885–86, the club enjoyed its best-ever FA Cup run. The club's last 16 tie, against Burslem Port Vale, proved controversial. The Vale ground was a "perfect quagmire" and Brentwood protested the condition of the pitch before the match. After the game, Brentwood added to their that "a point being given the Port Valeites which was never actually obtained, Mills-Roberts [Brentwood goalkeeper] swearing that the ball passed wide of the uprights." The Football Association upheld the protest and ordered a replay at a neutral venue (the County Ground in Derby), which ended 3–3. The FA directed that the second replay be held at Brentwood, and Burslem Port Vale, having had an offer of £50 to switch the tie declined by Brentwood, withdrew from the competition.

In the quarter-finals, the club lost at home to holders, and eventual winners, Blackburn Rovers, in front of a crowd of 3,000.

From the 1886–87 season, the club changed its name to Crusaders F.C., because of the club's move from Brentwood to Leyton and members considering the name was no longer appropriate, especially as there were plans to form a new club for Brentwood itself. As the Crusaders, the club's best run in the FA Cup was in 1887–88, reaching the fourth round after beating Lyndhurst 9-0 (the club's record Cup victory) in the first round, Old Wykehamists in the second, and Chatham in the third.

In 1889, Crusaders faced Royal Arsenal in the FA Cup third qualifying round, in the latter's first-ever FA Cup season, with future powerhouses Arsenal winning 5–2 in extra time; the Crusaders appealed the referee's decision to extend the match on the basis of the "shocking" light, but it was not successful. The club's last FA Cup tie came in 1892–93, losing in the second qualifying round to the Casuals.

The club continued playing friendly matches into the 1895–96 season, the final recorded game being a 6–1 defeat at home to the Old Etonians, and by September 1896 the club had disbanded.

== Colours ==
The club's colours were chocolate and magenta, with white "trousers".

== Ground ==
The club originally played at the County Cricket Ground at Shenfield Road. In 1886 it moved to the Leyton Cricket Ground, as the Brentwood Cricket Club had increased rent to £15 per annum, while the Essex County Cricket Club was offering Leyton rent-free, but instead taking a cut of the gate money.

== Notable players ==
- Thelwell Pike, capped for England against Ireland, 1886
- Richard Turner, Cup winner with Blackburn Rovers in 1885, who joined the Crusaders when he moved down to London in 1886
