= Dulwich F.C. =

Dulwich
- Full name: Dulwich F.C.
- Founded: 1884
- Dissolved: 1890?
- Ground: Greyhound Pub, Dulwich
Home colours

Dulwich was an English association football club who played near the Greyhound Pub, Dulwich.

== History ==
In 1880, the Lennox Association Football Club was founded, playing on Clapham Common. In 1883 Lennox moved to Dulwich, where Mosquitoes F.C. were already playing. At the end of the 1883–84 season, the two clubs merged, and took on the name Dulwich, playing at the Mosquitoes' home ground and using the same pub for its facilities.

The merged club first entered the FA Cup in 1884-85. In the first round, the club beat Pilgrims of Battersea Park, using a side which included five Mosquitoes players from the previous season, including club captain E. H. Whittle, who retained his status at the merged club. The club lost to Romford in the second round having had two goals disallowed.

The club reached the third round twice in the next three years. In the 1887-88 tournament, the club beat Reading 2–0, but Reading protested that a number of the Dulwich players had not been registered. The Football Association ordered a replay, for which Dulwich refused to turn up, so Reading kicked off, scored a goal, and claimed the tie. However the FA awarded the tie to Dulwich, apparently because the replayed tie should have taken place at Dulwich's ground.

In 1888-89, qualifying rounds were introduced, and the club lost 13–0 to London Caledonians in their first tie. The club then lost 9–0 to Old St Paul's the next season. That was Dulwich's last FA Cup tie and the club seems to have disbanded shortly afterwards.

== Colours ==
The club played in white and dark blue, which were similar to the last colours of Mosquitoes. The Lennox originally played in dark blue, changing to crimson and light blue in its last season.
