= Cleethorpes Town F.C. (1884) =

English association football club

Cleethorpes Town
- Full name: Cleethorpes Town Football Club
- Nickname: the Donkey Drivers
- Founded: 1884
- Dissolved: 1893
- Ground: Highgate
Home colours

Cleethorpes Town F.C. was an English association football club from the town of Cleethorpes in Lincolnshire.

== History ==
The club was founded in 1884. It first entered the Lincolnshire Senior Cup in 1885–86, losing 4–1 in the first round at Gainsborough Trinity.

Its first entry to the FA Cup was in 1886–87, the club recovering from conceding an early goal to beat Mellors 2–1. In the second round the club was well beaten by Lockwood Brothers at home.

The following season the club drew the professional side Grimsby Town at home. The Mariners offered £7 to switch the tie to Grimsby, but Cleethorpes refused. Grimsby therefore arranged a home match for the reserves on the same day, against Kiveton Park, and sent the first team to Cleethorpes. The crowd was only a couple of hundred and Grimsby won both matches 4–0, so the Cleethorpes gamble of a big home gate did not come off.

One of the club's players, Charles Colbeck, was present at the Grimsby Town against Staveley F.C. match in which William Cropper of Staveley died of injuries after a collision with Daniel Doyle, and gave evidence at the inquest.

The last record for the club is of a defeat to Grimsby Town reserves in the Grimsby League in 1893, and the name was revived in 1904 when St Peter's F.C. changed its name.

== Colours ==
The club's colours were cardinal shirts and white shorts.

== Ground ==
The club's original home ground was Highgate, on Cleethorpes High Street.
