= Chesham Town F.C. =

English football club

Chesham Town
- Nickname(s): the Amber and Blacks
- Founded: 1879
- Dissolved: 1917
- Ground: New Road
Home colours

Chesham Town Football Club was an English football club from Chesham, Buckinghamshire.

== History ==
Chesham and Waterside FC was founded by Rev Reade, curate of Christ Church, Chesham in 1879; its first game was against Amersham in October 1879, and its first competitive entry, in the Berks & Bucks Senior Cup in 1879–80, ended in a 5–1 first round defeat to Wycombe. By 1881, the club was simply known as Chesham.

The club first entered the FA Cup in 1885–86, losing at Luton Wanderers in the first round - the 3–2 score slightly flattered Chesham, as the Wanderers did not contest a claim for a goal for which neither umpire had a clear view. The club's only win in the main rounds of the competition came the following year when it beat Lyndhurst 4–2 at home - a win over Watford Rovers in 1887–88 was annulled after Chesham fielded an ineligible player.

In 1894 Chesham became a founder member of the Southern League. It was renamed Chesham Town in 1899 and continued to play in the Southern League until 1904, when it finished 11th and bottom of the table.

After a successful 1907–08 season, in which the club won the Berks & Bucks Senior Cup and the Lowndes Challenge Cup, it re-entered the Southern League in 1908 - simultaneously taking part in the second division of the South-Eastern League, which the club won in 1908–09 - but left four years later to become founder members of the Athenian League. It left the Athenian at the end of the 1913–14 season to join the Great Western Suburban League.

In 1917 the club merged with Chesham Generals to form Chesham United, which is still in existence.

== Colours ==
The club wore amber and black jerseys, black shorts, and black socks.

== Ground ==
The club played at the New Road Ground. It originally used the Crown Hotel for facilities.
