= Lockwood Brothers F.C. =

Lockwood Brothers
- Full name: Lockwood Brothers Football Club
- Nickname: the Blades
- Founded: 1870
- Dissolved: 1893?
- Ground: Hunter's Bar
- President: George Lockwood
Home colours

Lockwood Brothers F.C. was an English association football club based in Sheffield, Yorkshire.

== History ==
Lockwood Brothers was the works team of the Lockwood Brothers Ltd cutlery factory. During the Amateur v Professional crisis of the 1880s, the club took a stand by refusing to play the professional clubs of Lancashire. The club won the Sheffield Challenge Cup twice in the 1883–84 and 1884–85 seasons.

Although the club claimed a foundation date of 1870, there is no record of any matches against external opposition until 1874, the club's first matches being to the Sheffield rules. The club did not apply to join the Sheffield Football Association until 1879.

=== FA Cup ===
Lockwood Brothers entered the FA Cup several times in the 1880s. In 1884, the club lost to Staveley 3–1 in the third round after beating Sheffield 4–1 and Rotherham 3–1. In 1885, Sheffield gained revenge beating the club 3–0 in the first round and in 1886 Notts Rangers advanced to the second round at its expense. The Notts Rangers tie featured perhaps the first instance of a substitute in competitive play; after ten minutes, Brears, one of the Lockwood Brothers forwards, fell awkwardly and broke his leg. West, who had travelled as a reserve, was allowed to replace him for the rest of the match.

In 1886-87 they gained several Wednesday players due to the latter's club failure to register for the competition in time, and the club enjoyed its best run in the competition, reaching the fifth round (last 16). In the fifth round, the club lost 1-0 against West Bromwich Albion in extra-time, but Lockwood protested at the referee's refusal to allow a goal after the Albion goalkeeper Roberts cleared the ball from behind the goal-line; one umpire awarded the goal, the other umpire did not disagree but claimed he did not see what happened, and the referee refused to allow the goal. The FA upheld the Lockwood protest on the basis that the decision should not have been referred to the referee, as there was no disagreement between the umpires. This was particularly hard lines on Lockwood as the goal was within the 90 minutes and would have won the club the tie. The replay, at the Derby Midland ground, was won by Albion, who went on to reach the final.

Having to compete in Qualifying Rounds for the first time in 1888-89, the Blades reached the first round by beating Long Eaton Rangers 1–0, Cleethorpes 4–1 and Nottingham Forest 2–1 and receiving a bye in the fourth qualifying round. The club was finally knocked out in the first round by West Bromwich Albion, losing 2–1.

=== End of the club ===
It is unclear what the club's final match was, but in 1893 the club was described as "now defunct".

== Colours ==
The club's colours were described as navy blue in 1880 and blue in 1887–1888. Photographic evidence confirms that the club wore white knickers.

== Grounds ==
The club originally played in Heeley, but later moved to Hunter's Bar on the Ecclesall Road; originally the club used the Noah's Ark pub for its facilities, but by 1887 it was using the Levair Hotel.

== Notable former players ==
Players that played in the Football League either before or after being with Lockwood Brothers –

- Ned Stringer

=== League and cup history ===
Lockwood Brothers League and Cup history
Season	FA Cup
1881–82	1st Round
1882–83	2nd Round
1883–84	3rd Round
1884–85	1st Round
1885–86	1st Round
1886–87	5th Round
1887–88	3rd Round

== Honours ==
=== League ===
None

=== Cup ===
- Sheffield & Hallamshire Senior Cup
  - Winners: 1883–84, 1884–85
  - Runners-up: 1882–83

== Records ==
- Best FA Cup performance: 5th Round, 1886–87
