= Rochester F.C. =

Rochester
- Full name: Rochester Football Club
- Founded: 1868
- Dissolved: 1895
- Ground: Borstal Road
- Secretary: 1893: C. K. Spencer; 1894: R. H. Stewart
Home colours

Rochester F.C. was an English association football club from Rochester in Kent.

== History ==
The club was formed in September 1868 and played its first game against the Mid-Kent Club in November 1868. Although the club was founded to play under Association laws, in the 1868–69 season it still appeared to be operating under an outdated set of laws, as it is recorded having beaten a Maidstone side by 5 touchdowns to 0, with no goals being scored; the club unaware that the touchdown had been abolished in 1867.

For the club's first seven seasons, its opponents were other Kentish clubs, such as Maidstone and the Royal Engineers, plus the south London clubs the Wanderers and Crystal Palace.

The club did not enter the FA Cup until 1875–76, losing to Herts Rangers in the first round. This is the first reported match the club played north of the River Thames. The following year saw the club go on its best-ever FA Cup run, beating Union in the first round and the Swifts in the second, the latter in front of a crowd of around 150, after a slight controversy regarding the original match ball, which seems to have been more a rugby ball than association ball; "one way it measured the required length, but the other was much smaller". The club lost 4–0 to Cambridge University at the Kennington Oval in the third round (that year, the last 10), although the final goal was "palpably off-side".

The club entered the Cup every year until 1892–93, but only once more reached the third round; in 1882–83 (that year a final 25), after receiving a bye in the second. The club's biggest FA Cup win was 6–1 over Reading in 1885–86.

Rochester's last appearance in the competition proper was in 1887–88, when the club was drawn against the Royal Engineers. Although the Sappers won 3–0, the Football Association ordered a replay on the basis that they had fielded two players who had not been registered for the competition. However, two of Rochester's players had been injured in the original match, and the club scratched.

The club's final Cup tie was in the first qualifying round in 1892–93, losing 4–1 at Clapton. It seems that the Kent club had difficulties in raising a team, as not one of the Rochester players listed on the fixture card (a forerunner to the football programme) appeared in the match itself.

The club remained amateur as professionalism took over, and at the start of the 1894–95 season its financial position demonstrated how minuscule the club had become, having only taken in £34 10/7 in the previous season, and the losses incurred grew the club's debts to £20. The club therefore resolved only to play friendly matches to avoid the costs of the Kent Football League and County Badge competition, and in September 1895 not to play any matches at all in the 1895–96 season; although the committee remained in place, the club never played again.

== Colours ==
The club's original colours were black & white hoops, plus a black velvet cap with the City of Rochester arms in silver. The cap was dropped from 1870.

== Ground ==
The club played on the Borstal Road to the south-west of Rochester, a mile from Rochester Bridge station and with a club house on the Esplanade, although it was apparently not always easy to find, with the Cup tie against the Swifts kicking off late because of the difficulties the visitors had in locating the pitch.

== Notable players ==
- William Lindsay, who was a Rochester member when chosen to play for Scotland in the England v Scotland representative matches in 1870.
