= Derby Midland F.C. =

Derby Midland
- Full name: Derby Midland Football Club
- Nickname(s): the Railwaymen, the Mids
- Founded: 1881
- Dissolved: 1891
- Ground: Midland Station
- Secretary: A. G. Aitken
- League: Midland Football League
- 1890–91: Midland Football League, 4th
1885–90 colours	1890–91 colours

Derby Midland F.C. were an English football club, in existence from 1881 until 1891.

== History ==
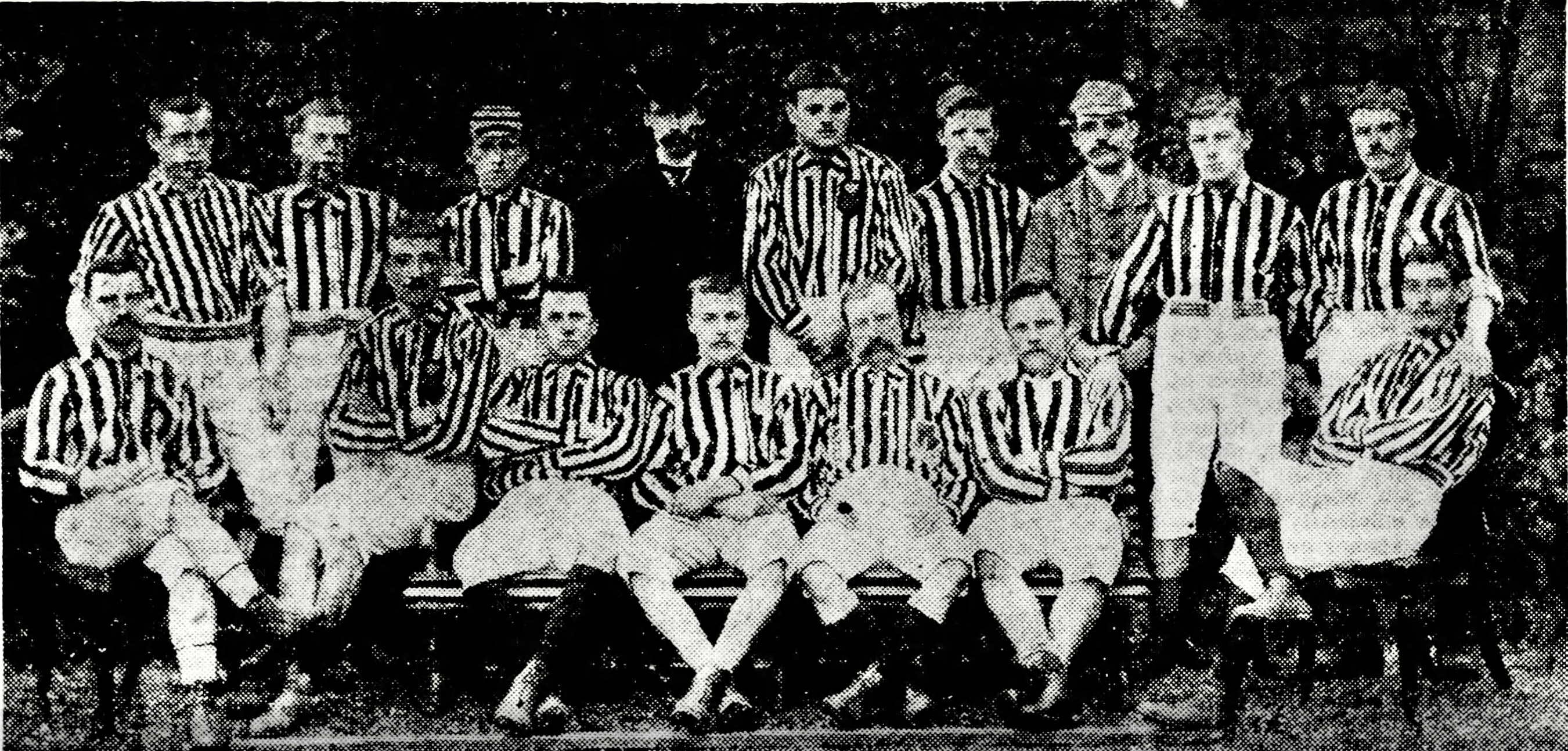
Derby Midland F.C., 1888–89

There is a match recorded to a Derby Midland Club (with 15 players per side) against Wirksworth Football Club in 1873. However the instant club was founded in 1881 as the works side of the Midland Railway, and instantly caused attention as the Derby Town captain Evans, as an employee of the railway, played for the Midland against the Town in the first round of the 1881–82 Birmingham Senior Cup. Even more startlingly the Midland men won the tie 2–0. Midland made it through to the quarter-final of the competition before bowing out to holders Walsall Swifts at the Aston Lower Grounds; Midland was 4–0 down at one stage, but were stronger in the closing stages, and pulled the game back to 4–2 before time ran out.

That season saw the club's best run in the Birmingham Senior Cup, although it gained its biggest competitive win in the second round in 1885–86, beating the Nettlefolds works side 11–1 away from home. The club was runner-up in the first two editions of the Derbyshire Senior Cup (in 1882–83 and 1883–84), both times losing the final to Staveley.

The Midland entered the FA Cup from 1883–84 until 1890–91. In its first entry, the club reached the third round, albeit thanks to receiving a bye in the first round; at the third round stage (the last 28, owing to the lopsided draw), Midland lost 1–0 at Wednesbury Town. Its best run came in 1889–90, as Midland, being a non-league side, had to start at the qualifying stage, and in the first round proper Midland shocked Football Alliance side Nottingham Forest with a 3–0 win, thanks to second-half goals from right-wingers Thomas Daft and Samuel Mills, and half-back Henry Garden. In the second round (last 16), the club lost 2–1 at Bootle, despite the home side playing the second half with 10 men because of an injury to Hughes.

The formation of the Football League in 1888 meant that clubs outside it were forced to look for alternative competition. The Mids were one of the members of The Combination in 1888–89, but the competition fell apart before the season end, and the club had only won 4 of the 17 fixtures it played; it was not one of those which was involved in setting up the Alliance.

It was however a founder member of the Midland Football League in 1889, and finished second in 1889–90, a win in the final match against Burton Wanderers leapfrogging the Mids over their opponents, albeit some distance behind champions Lincoln City. The 1889–90 season however saw the Mids gain their greatest triumph, coming from behind to beat Long Eaton Rangers 3–1 in the final of the Derbyshire Senior Cup, to lift the trophy for the only time; two goals in two minutes from G. W. Smith, in the last quarter of an hour, proved crucial. The game was played at the Matlock Bridge Cricket Ground and the Midland Railway provided special trains from Long Eaton, with over 2,000 fans taking advantage. The two clubs also met in the semi-final of the Derbyshire Charity Cup a month later; the Mids scored 5 goals in the first 10 minutes, and, although the Rangers pegged the score back to 5–3 by half-time, the Mids won through 8–3. The Mids had a similarly easy task in the final, again at Matlock Bridge, beating Staveley 4–1.

The club's last season was 1890–91, and was somewhat anti-climactic, only finishing 4th in the Midland League, and losing to Loughborough in the first qualifying round of the Cup. However, in May 1891, a rumour spread that the directors of the Midland Railway intended that the Railway would no longer employ professional footballers, so the club would have to turn amateur; the directors denied this was their intention, but within two weeks they confirmed the decision, which "failed to find favour with every quarter". The Mids' committee therefore resolved to join forces with Derby County, originally intending to continue under the Midland name in the Midland League, but the Midland League refused to countenance the presence of a de facto second XI, and with the League's decision to refuse membership for the combined club, the Midland name died.

== Colours ==
The club originally played in dark blue jerseys. In 1885 it changed to black and white stripes, and by 1890 was wearing black jerseys with white knickers.

== Ground ==
The club's ground was at the Midland Station.

== Honours ==
- FA Cup
  - Best performance: last 16, 1889–90
- Midland League
  - Runner-up: 1889–90
- Derbyshire Senior Cup
  - Winner: 1889–90
  - Runner-up: 1882–83, 1883–84
- Derbyshire Charity Cup
  - Winner: 1889–90

== See also ==
- Derby Midland F.C. players
