= Long Eaton Rangers F.C. =

Long Eaton Rangers
- Full name: Long Eaton Rangers Football Club
- Nicknames: the Eatonians, the Rangers
- Founded: 1881
- Dissolved: 1899
- Ground: Recreation Ground, Long Eaton
- League: Midland League
- 1898–99: 13th of 14
1881–87 colours	1893–99 colours

Long Eaton Rangers Football Club was a football club based in Long Eaton, Derbyshire, England, which, for a brief period in the 1880s, had a legitimate claim to being one of the best teams in the country. They were founding members of the second ever league, The Combination, in 1888, and when that folded, the Football Alliance in 1889.

== History ==
The club was founded in 1881, as an amalgamation of two clubs (United and Imperial), playing in fields that were opposite what would, in 1884, become the Long Eaton Recreation Ground. The first reported game for the club was a goalless draw at Derby Midland in November 1881. The club was unbeaten at home for its first two seasons.

The first impact the club made on a wider stage was when beating Aston Villa reserve side 5–1, away from home, in a friendly in November 1882. The strong 1882–83 season for the club - it won 23 of 26 matches, only losing one, narrowly, to the very strong Nottingham Forest - encouraged the Eatonians to enter the Birmingham Senior Cup, which for clubs in the region ranked second only to the FA Cup in importance. The club first entered the competition in 1883–84, losing in the second round to Birmingham Excelsior, and in their next appearance, in 1885–86, at the same stage in a replay to Mitchells St George's.

=== Birmingham Senior Cup triumph ===
However, in 1886–87, thanks in part to a kind draw, and to Darlaston All Saints agreeing to replay a match rather than insist on the Eatonites' expulsion for fielding an ineligible player, the club reached the semi-finals. The tie, against Small Heath Alliance, who had been FA Cup semi-finalists the year before, was played at the Aston Lower Grounds, and ended 2–2, the Rangers coming from 2–0 down at half-time. The Eatonites won the replay 2–0 at the Coventry Road ground to reach the final against West Bromwich Albion. The Throstles had reached the FA Cup final in 1886 and 1887, and would win the Cup in 1888, so were heavy favourites; however, at Wellington Road, the home of Aston Villa, Rangers won 1–0, thanks to a deflected free-kick from Winfield with ten minutes to go. The only disappointment was the low crowd of just 2,000, fewer than saw the Rangers' defeat to Staveley in the Derbyshire Cup the month before. The club reached the quarter-finals for the next two seasons before its withdrawal from national competition.

Despite these successes on the local stage, a long run in the FA Cup eluded the Rangers. With the competition arranged on a regional level, the club was put into "divisions" which featured many of the country's leading clubs, and Long Eaton never had the luck of the draw; the club's first round opponents in its first entries (from FA Cup to 1886-87 were Wolverhampton Wanderers, the Wednesday (twice), and a Lockwood Brothers side that had inherited a number of Wednesday players for that season's competition. In those first entries, the club won one match, against The Wednesday in 1885–86, before a "large number of spectators", and helped by the Wednesday playing half of the match with ten men because of injury. The club's first match in the second round was at home to Staveley and attracted a crowd of 3,000, but an injury-hit Rangers were continually hit on the break and lost 4–0.

Even when Rangers had a kindly first round draw for the first time, in 1887–88, the club still drew the Wednesday, for the third time, in the second round. The Wednesday won with a winning goal in the optional half-an-hour extra-time period. The Rangers' defence of the Birmingham Senior Cup ended in farce in the first round - regular goalkeeper Start refused to play in the first round tie with Stoke because his brother had been dropped, so Bestwick, who had not played for six years, was brought in instead, and he conceded seven.

=== 1888–89: the Combination ===
The Birmingham Senior Cup success was not enough for the Rangers to be one of the clubs invited to form the Football League; it is likely that the founders considered Long Eaton too small a place to attract the large crowds required for an initial franchise position. Instead, for 1888–89, the club was a member of the Combination, and played its complement of 16 matches, with a strong record of eight wins, four draws, and four defeats - second only to Notts Rangers of the clubs that completed so many matches (although both Newton Heath and Bootle had gained more points in fewer matches).

The club's record however was good enough to gain exemption from the FA Cup's first set of qualifying rounds, and it was placed in the first round proper, with 31 other clubs. Again the regional nature of the draw was unkind to the club, and it was drawn away to Birmingham St George's, losing 3–2 to a team that would reach the quarter-finals.

=== 1889–90: the Football Alliance ===
With the collapse of the Combination, the Rangers were one of the clubs that banded together to form the Football Alliance, although it was not one of the clubs originally accepted; Before the season started, Sunderland withdrew and the Rangers were voted in, thanks to the chairman's casting vote for the club over Witton of Blackburn. However the season was a disaster for the club. With several League clubs within easy reach of Long Eaton, the club found it difficult to attract players and fans, and the extra costs of playing in a national league added to the problems. The club lost its first qualifying match for the FA Cup to Staveley and finished bottom of the Alliance, with 10 points from 22 games, seven points adrift of the next club. The Rangers did not win any of their last 10 games, the lowlight being a 9–1 defeat at the Wednesday on 16 November 1889 - having won the return fixture two months before. The Rangers therefore resigned from the Alliance to join the Midland League.

=== 1890–99: the Midland League ===
The Midland League was in its second season and Rangers finished second, two points behind Gainsborough Trinity, in 1890–91, and won the Derbyshire Senior Cup for the first time. 6 of the 10 clubs in the Midland League would eventually join the Football League; however Long Eaton Rangers never applied for membership.

The club never reached such heights again, and indeed finished the 1891–92 season only four points off the bottom. It also never got beyond the first round proper of the FA Cup, only winning through the qualifying rounds twice (in 1890–91 and 1897–98).

The club ceased to operate before the 1899–1900 season, the club withdrawing from the Midland League for financial reasons, having finished bottom of the table with 20 points from 26 matches. Two weeks after the club withdrew, the Derbyshire Football Association suspended the club for telling a player that the club was insolvent and he "would have to take his chance when the debts were liquidated". In 1900 the club launched an unsuccessful public appeal to clear debts and re-start the team.

== Ground ==
They played at the Recreation Ground, later the site of Long Eaton Stadium, from its opening in 1885. Previous to that the club played on a ground opposite to the site.

== Colours ==
Rangers originally played in a chocolate and sky blue halved shirt with white knickers and dark socks. By 1887 the club changed to white shirts, originally with red trimmings, but by 1893 the trimmings were blue.

== Honours ==
Birmingham Senior Cup

- Winners: 1886–87

Derbyshire Senior Cup

- Winners: 1890–91
- Runners-up: 1886–87, 1889–90, 1891–92

Derbyshire Charity Cup

- Winners: 1888–89

== Notable players ==
- "Tich" Smith, future Nottingham Forest regular and unofficial England international
