= Newcastle West End F.C. =

Newcastle West End
- Full name: Newcastle West End Football Club
- Founded: 1882
- Dissolved: 1892
- Ground: St James' Park, Newcastle
- Capacity: Unknown
- 1891–92: Northern League
Home colours

Newcastle West End Football Club was an English football club which briefly played in the Northern League and the FA Cup in the late 19th century. Their entire history was played out during the Victorian era in Newcastle.

The club is most noted for being one of the two football sides that were in Newcastle at the time. They are often mistakenly believed to have merged with Newcastle East End in 1892, but, in fact, Newcastle West End ran into financial difficulties which led to their collapse 10 years after they first became established. Newcastle United had Newcastle West End's shirt revived as United's away kit on occasions such as the 1995–96 season and the 2024–25 season.

== History ==
The club was formed in August 1882 after local cricket side West End Cricket Club decided to form a footballing section. Originally the club were based at Town Moor cricket ground but after a while of playing there they moved to a football-specific ground off the Great North Road in 1885, just a year later in May the club moved again to St James' Park. There was a Tyne Association club which had entered previous FA Cups in 1880.

Despite the foundation of The Football League the club did not apply for membership, instead becoming a founding member of the Northern League in 1889–90. The club came agonisingly close to winning the Northern League in their first season, led by prominent figure Tom Watson, the club finished as runners-up on goal difference to Darlington St. Augustine's.

The same season as their league runners-up spot, West End entered into the FA Cup, reaching the first round before going out narrowly to Grimsby Town. The club's league form declined significantly in the following two seasons, where they finished seventh and eighth respectively out of nine. The departure of Tom Watson to bitter cross city rivals Newcastle East End is cited as a large reason for the club's decline and eventual decline into financial woes which lead to their collapse in 1892.

=== Newcastle East End ===
Bitter local rivals from across the city, Newcastle East End had a much better financial situation, they had become professional and a limited company. As Newcastle West End dissolved, Newcastle East End hired some of their previous rival's backroom staff and players and secured St James' Park, which was superior to their ground on Chillingham Road.

In December 1892, the club decided to adopt a new name due to supporters now only having one team in Newcastle to support. Supported names included Newcastle Rangers, Newcastle City and Newcastle United. The latter name was decided upon signifying Newcastle's now only football team. The name change was accepted by The Football Association on 22 December, but the name change was not legally constituted as Newcastle United Football Club Co. Ltd. until 6 September 1895.

== See also ==
- Category:Newcastle West End F.C. players
