= 1884–85 FA Cup =

Tournament details
- Country: England; Scotland; Wales
- Teams: 114

Final positions
- Champions: Blackburn Rovers (2nd title)
- Runners-up: Queen's Park

The 1884–85 Football Association Challenge Cup was the 14th staging of the FA Cup, England's oldest football tournament. 116 teams entered, 16 more than the previous season, although 9 of these never played a match.

== First round ==
Home club	Score	Away club	Date
Darwen	11–0	Bradshaw	11 October 1884
Dulwich	3–2	Pilgrims	8 November 1884
Grantham	1–1	Grimsby Town	25 October 1884
Reading	2–0	Rochester	8 November 1884
Marlow	10–1	Royal Engineers	8 November 1884
Maidenhead	0–3	Old Wykehamists	8 November 1884
Clapham Rovers	3–3	Hendon	8 November 1884
Queen's Park (Scotland)	Walkover	Stoke	
Uxbridge	1–3	Hotspur	8 November 1884
Swifts	3–0	Old Brightonians	8 November 1884
Druids (Wales)	6–1	Liverpool Ramblers	8 November 1884
Notts County	2–0	Notts Olympic	8 November 1884
Old Foresters	8–0	Hoddesdon Town	1 November 1884
Nottingham Forest	5–0	Rotherham Town	8 November 1884
Romford	3–2	Clapton	1 November 1884
Brentwood	2–0	Barnes	8 November 1884
Henley	Bye		
West End	3–3	Upton Park	8 November 1884
Blackburn Rovers	11–0	Rossendale	11 October 1884
Hanover United	1–0	Reading Minster	8 November 1884
Aston Villa	4–1	Wednesbury Town	1 November 1884
Acton	1–7	Old Carthusians	8 November 1884
Blackburn Olympic	12–0	Oswaldtwistle Rovers	11 October 1884
Staveley	4–1	Notts Rangers	8 November 1884
Sheffield Heeley	1–0	Nottingham Wanderers	8 November 1884
Accrington	void	Southport	11 October 1884
Lockwood Brothers	0–3	Sheffield	8 November 1884
Fishwick Ramblers	2–1	Darwen Ramblers	1 November 1884
Chatham	Walkover	Windsor	
South Shore	Walkover	Rawtenstall	
Spital	Bye		
Aston Unity	0–5	St George's	1 November 1884
Macclesfield	9–0	Hartford St John's	8 November 1884
South Reading	4–1	Casuals	8 November 1884
Walsall Swifts	0–0	Stafford Road	8 November 1884
Lower Darwen	4–1	Halliwell	11 October 1884
Old Westminsters	6–0	Bournemouth Rovers	1 November 1884
Redcar and Coatham	3–1	Sunderland	8 November 1884
Wrexham Olympic (Wales)	1–0	Goldenhill	18 October 1884
Bolton Association	Walkover	Astley Bridge	
Hull Town	1–5	Lincoln City	1 November 1884
Wolverhampton Wanderers	0–0	Derby St Luke's	8 November 1884
Derby Midland	1–2	Wednesbury Old Athletic	8 November 1884
Hurst	2–3	Church	18 October 1884
Crewe Alexandra	2–1	Oswestry	8 November 1884
Long Eaton Rangers	0–1	The Wednesday	8 November 1884
Middlesbrough	Walkover	Grimsby & District	
Blackburn Park Road	3-3	Low Moor	25 October 1884
Birmingham Excelsior	2–0	Small Heath Alliance	8 November 1884
Leek	4–3	Northwich Victoria	8 November 1884
Newark	7–3	Spilsby	8 November 1884
Witton	Walkover	Clitheroe	
Derby County	0–7	Walsall Town	8 November 1884
Derby Junction	1–7	West Bromwich Albion	25 October 1884
Newtown (Wales)	Walkover	Stafford Rangers	
Luton Wanderers	1–3	Old Etonians	8 November 1884
Chirk (Wales)	4–2	Davenham	25 October 1884
Higher Walton	1–1	Darwen Old Wanderers	11 October 1884
Bolton Wanderers	both w/d	Preston Zingari	

=== Replays ===
Home club	Score	Away club	Date
Grimsby Town	1–0	Grantham	8 November 1884
Hendon	6–0	Clapham Rovers	22 November 1884
Upton Park	Walkover	West End	
Walsall Swifts	2–1	Stafford Road	17 November 1884
Derby St Luke's	4–2	Wolverhampton Wanderers	22 November 1884
Darwen Old Wanderers	4–1	Higher Walton	8 November 1884
Low Moor	Walkover	Blackburn Park Road	

== Second round ==
Home club	Score	Away club	Date
Sheffield	4–1	Chesterfield Spital	6 December 1884
Queen's Park (Scotland)	2–1	Crewe Alexandra	6 December 1884
Upton Park	3–1	Reading	6 December 1884
Swifts	3–2	South Reading	6 December 1884
Nottingham Forest	4–1	Sheffield Heeley	6 December 1884
Romford	3–0	Dulwich	6 December 1884
Brentwood	2–2	Old Etonians	6 December 1884
Blackburn Rovers	3–2	Blackburn Olympic	6 December 1884
Hanover United	2–1	Old Foresters	29 November 1884
Hotspur	1–2	Old Wykehamists	6 December 1884
Old Carthusians	5–3	Marlow	6 December 1884
Sheffield Wednesday	Bye		
Staveley	0–2	Notts County	6 December 1884
St George's	3-3	Birmingham Excelsior	6 December 1884
Chatham	1–0	Hendon	6 December 1884
Grimsby Town	3–1	Redcar and Coatham	6 December 1884
Walsall Town	0–2	Aston Villa	6 December 1884
South Shore	2–3	Church	6 December 1884
Macclesfield	1–5	Leek	6 December 1884
Lower Darwen	Bye		
Old Westminsters	7–0	Henley	6 December 1884
Southport	3–1	Low Moor	22 November 1884
Middlesbrough	4–1	Newark	6 December 1884
West Bromwich Albion	4–2	Wednesbury Old Athletic	6 December 1884
Witton	Bye		
Derby St Luke's	0–1	Walsall Swifts	6 December 1884
Darwen Old Wanderers	7–2	Bolton Association	29 November 1884
Fishwick Ramblers	0–2	Darwen	22 November 1884
Newtown (Wales)	1–1	Druids (Wales)	20 December 1884
Lincoln City	Bye		
Chirk (Wales)	4–1	Wrexham Olympic (Wales)	29 November 1884

=== Replays ===
Home club	Score	Away club	Date
Old Etonians	6–1	Brentwood	20 December 1884
St George's	2–0	Birmingham Excelsior	20 December 1884
Druids (Wales)	6–0	Newtown (Wales)	27 December 1884

== Third round ==
Home club	Score	Away club	Date
Darwen	Bye		
Old Etonians	Bye		
Swifts	1–1	Old Westminsters	3 January 1885
Druids (Wales)	4–1	Chirk (Wales)	10 January 1885
Old Wykehamists	2–1	Upton Park	3 January 1885
Notts County	5–0	Sheffield	3 January 1885
Romford	Bye		
Blackburn Rovers	5–0	Witton	22 December 1884
Hanover United	0–2	Chatham	3 January 1885
Aston Villa	0–0	West Bromwich Albion	3 January 1885
Old Carthusians	Bye		
The Wednesday	1–2	Nottingham Forest	3 January 1885
St George's	2–3	Walsall Swifts	10 January 1885
Grimsby Town	1–0	Lincoln City	3 January 1885
Church	10–0	Southport	3 January 1885
Lower Darwen	4–2	Darwen Old Wanderers	20 December 1884
Middlesbrough	Bye		
Leek	2–3	Queen's Park (Scotland)	3 January 1885

=== Replays ===
Home club	Score	Away club	Date
Old Westminsters	2–2	Swifts	14 January 1885
Swifts	2–1	Old Westminsters	21 January 1885
West Bromwich Albion	3–0	Aston Villa	10 January 1885

== Note ==
Match ended early after St George's walked off in protest at the Swifts' third goal being awarded; result was allowed to stand

== Fourth round ==
Home club	Score	Away club	Date
Queen's Park (Scotland)	7–0	Old Wykehamists	17 January 1885
Old Etonians	5–2	Middlesbrough	24 January 1885
Swifts	0–1	Nottingham Forest	24 January 1885
Blackburn Rovers	8–0	Romford	17 January 1885
Old Carthusians	3–0	Grimsby Town	24 January 1885
Chatham	1–0	Lower Darwen	24 January 1885
Church	3–0	Darwen	17 January 1885
Walsall Swifts	1–4	Notts County	24 January 1885
West Bromwich Albion	1–0	Druids (Wales)	24 January 1885

== Fifth round ==
The geographical nature of the early rounds left the competition with 9 clubs at this stage, and the Football Association Committee decided to draw two clubs for one fixture in the fifth round in order to "obviate the necessity of further byes". Following the drawing of Chatham and Old Carthusians, the Committee then drew the sixth round, the winners of the one fifth round tie being drawn to face Church F.C., who had the choice of ground.

Home club	Score	Away club	Date
Chatham	0–3	Old Carthusians	7 February 1885

== Sixth Round ==
Home club	Score	Away club	Date
Old Etonians	0–2	Nottingham Forest	21 February 1885
Notts County	2–2	Queen's Park (Scotland)	21 February 1885
Church	0–1	Old Carthusians	14 February 1885
West Bromwich Albion	0–2	Blackburn Rovers	21 February 1885

=== Replay ===
Home club	Score	Away club	Date
Queen's Park (Scotland)	2–1	Notts County	28 February 1885

== Semi finals ==
Home club	Score	Away club	Date
Nottingham Forest	1–1	Queen's Park (Scotland)	14 March 1885
Blackburn Rovers	5–1	Old Carthusians	7 March 1885

=== Replay ===
Home club	Score	Away club	Date
Queen's Park (Scotland)	3–0	Nottingham Forest	28 March 1885

== Final ==
Home club	Score	Away club	Date
Blackburn Rovers	2–0	Queen's Park (Scotland)	4 April 1885
