= Higher Walton F.C. =

Higher Walton
- Full name: Higher Walton Football Club
- Nicknames: the Waltonians, the Villagers
- Founded: 1882
- Dissolved: 1895
- Ground: Higher Walton Football Ground
Home colours

Higher Walton Football Club was an English football club from Higher Walton in Lancashire, founded in 1882.

== History ==
The first reported game for the club was in September 1882, when the club beat Lostock Hall 3–0. Within a month the club was attracting 400 spectators to its matches, originally on the King George V playing fields behind the Mill Tavern, within a bend of the River Darwen.

The club entered became a member of the Lancashire Football Association in time for the 1883–84 season and entered the Lancashire Senior Cup for the first time, beating Oswaldtwistle St Paul's 8–3 in the first round, but had to replay the tie after a protest, winning the second game 3–0. The club lost in the second round 5–2 at Love Clough.

The next season the Waltonians made their FA Cup bow, losing in a first round replay to Darwen Old Wanderers.

The club suffered early exits in the competitions over the next couple of years. In 1885-86 the club went down 4–3 in a thriller at South Shore, the game interrupted by a pitch invasion from jubilant local fans after the home side went 4–2 up, and in the 1886-87 FA Cup the club was unlucky to be drawn away to the Third Lanarkshire Rifle Volunteers, one of the top Scottish teams at the time.

The 1887–88 season was more positive for the club, even though it only registered one professional player (William Fox) - for comparison, even Rawtenstall registered six. The first home game of the season saw the Waltonians beat Padiham 2–0, with one goal disallowed because the ball had burst before Iddon headed home. The second game was a 13–1 victory over Wigan A.F.C. Although beaten by Accrington in the second round of the Lancashire Cup, the club reached the third round of the FA equivalent. When Heywood Central turned up at Higher Walton for the first round tie, they announced that they were withdrawing, but would be happy to play a friendly (which the Waltonians won 8–1). After beating Fleetwood Rangers away in the second round, the club was beaten by the professional Bootle side in the third. Unfortunately the club could not enjoy decent gate receipts because a rival match between Everton and Preston North End kept the crowd down to a mere 500.

=== 1888–89: Lancashire Cup runners-up ===
After the formation of the Football League, Higher Walton was put into the FA Cup's qualifying rounds, losing to South Shore in the penultimate. In the Lancashire Cup however the club beat the fading Blackburn Olympic in the first round, and in the second were expected to be beaten heavily by Blackburn Rovers. The Villagers held the Rovers to a 3–3 draw at home, fog preventing extra-time, and at Rovers' Leamington Road ground, came back from 3–0 down to win 5–4.

In the semi-final, Higher Walton faced another League side, Everton, again at Leamington Road, and again pulled off a shock, beating the Liverpool side 3–1. Although Everton were reduced to ten men through injury, Higher Walter was already 2–0 up by that stage.

The final was against Accrington and was Higher Walton's third consecutive tie at the Leamington Road ground. Accrington was lucky to be in the final - for their third round tie the club turned up late to Halliwell and the Bolton side claimed the tie; however, before the crowd had left, Accrington turned up and the tie took place, the Owd Reds winning 1–0. The final ended 1–1 and around 6,000 turned up to Deepdale for the replay. The fairytale could not continue and the Owd Reds scored the only goal of the game.

=== 1889–90: Lancashire League champions ===
The Waltonians were one of the 14 founder members of the Lancashire League in 1889. Higher Walton won every home game except one (a 3–3 draw with Blackpool) but a 1–0 win away at Southport Central in the penultimate game secured the club the inaugural title. There was less fortune in the senior Cup competitions, the club losing in the FA Cup preliminaries at South Shore again, and 7–0 at League side Burnley in the Lancashire Cup semi-final. The club did however win the East Lancashire Charity Shield for junior clubs, hammering Brierfield 9–1 in the final.

=== 1890–95: Decline and extinction ===
With professional league football under way, and several teams in the region playing in the League and the Football Alliance, Higher Walton found it difficult to retain players, and never reached such heights again; the club's defence of the title ended in a mid-table finish and included an 8–1 defeat at the previous season's runners-up Bury. A rule change in the Lancashire League for 1892–93 requiring all matches to kick-off at 3pm or 3.15pm put the club at a disadvantage as its amateur players usually worked until 12.45pm on Saturdays. The club's first match in the 1892–93 season, at the new Liverpool club, saw the Villagers turn up with only 10 men and get beaten 8–0. The return match - won 5–0 by Liverpool - had a crowd of just 150.

The club finished bottom of the Lancashire League with 3 wins out of 22 and resigned from the competition, to join the Preston & District amateur league for 1893–94. Even at this level the club struggled, finishing mid-table with 15 points from 15 matches - and its distance from the senior game was emphasized by a 11–0 defeat at Rossendale in the Senior Cup. Higher Walton resigned from the league at the end of the season and its final match was in the Lancashire Junior Cup in January 1895, losing 9–1 to Oswaldtwistle Rovers.

== Colours ==
The club originally played in blue and white halves, but by 1886 had changed to "chocolate, blue and white", probably referring to halved shirts and plain knickers.

== Ground ==
The club's ground did not have a specific name, but overlapped the site of the current King George V playing fields. The club originally used the Mill Tavern for facilities, and in 1891 moved to the nearer Farmer's Arms.

== Honours ==
Lancashire League:

- Champions 1890–91

Lancashire Cup:

- Runners-up: 1888–89

East Lancashire Charity Shield:

- Winners 1890–91

== Notable players ==
- Joseph Heyes, half-back for the club before joining Blackburn Rovers in 1885
