= Stafford County F.C. =

Former association football club

Stafford County
- Full name: Stafford County Amateur Football Club
- Founded: 1890
- Dissolved: 1891
- Ground: County Cricket Ground
- Secretary: W. Dodsworth
Home colours

Stafford County F.C. was an amateur association football club from Stoke-on-Trent which was a member of one of the early football leagues, The Combination, in 1890.

== History ==
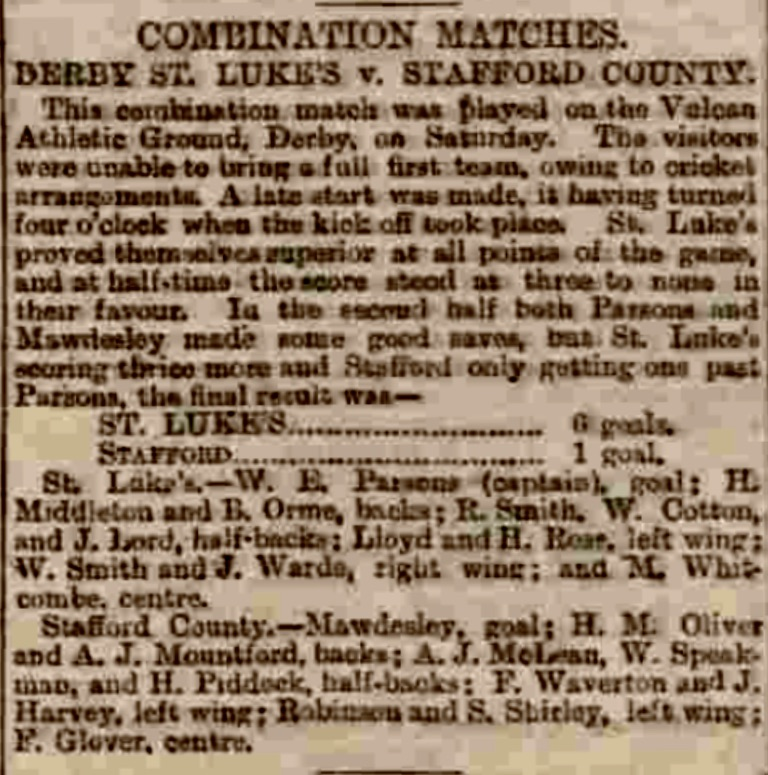
The club's first Combination match, Sheffield Daily Telegraph, 15 September 1890

The club was founded in March 1890, along the lines of the Corinthian F.C., with the aim of providing an outlet for amateur footballers in Staffordshire, given the rise of the Football League and the professionalism of Stoke's two leading clubs. Indeed, the new club ambitiously recruited some of the Corinthian members; in imitation of the Corinthian, the club originally resolved not to play competitive football, relying solely on friendlies.

However, the club in the end decided to apply for membership of a new competition - The Combination - and was elected as one of the twelve founding members. County's first match was away to Derby St Luke's. It was an inglorious debut, the side arriving so late that kick-off was delayed until 5pm, and going down 6–1.

The Combination proved to be far too high a standard, County losing its first eight games; the nadir was a 14–1 dismantling at Chester, and the performance in a 7–0 defeat at Buxton saw such a bad performance that there was an altercation with club officials, the homesters thinking that County had sent a reserve side - and in fact none of the starting XI had featured in the St Luke's fixture. With competition from Stoke and Burslem Port Vale, there was also very little interest in the side - the attendance for the home game with Gorton Villa was under 20.

On the eve of the club's ninth Combination match (the return against Derby St Luke's), the club committee resolved to resign from the competition after the game the next day. As luck would have it, County won 3–2, thanks to an 86th-minute winner from McHarg; County was also helped by the Saints having to split their efforts, another XI playing Derby Junction in the Derbyshire Senior Cup on the same day.

Despite initial hopes that it would re-consider, the club stuck to its resignation; its final record was 11 goals for and 57 against in its 9 matches. Its results were duly expunged.

Without any league competition, the club tried to continue, seeking friendly fixtures with other clubs, but such were difficult to arrange, and the last recorded fixture for County was a 1–0 defeat at Leek in March 1891. The fixture was a last-minute arrangement after Derby St Luke's followed County's example in resigning from The Combination, with Leek deprived of its scheduled league match.

== Colours ==
The club wore black and white "quartered" shirts - at the time, the term referred to counterchanged halves - and dark "knicks" and stockings.

== Ground ==
The club played at the County Cricket Ground in Stoke-on-Trent.
