= Halliwell F.C. =

Halliwell
- Full name: Halliwell Football Club
- Nicknames: The Halliwellites, The Halliwellians
- Founded: 1877
- Dissolved: 1893
- Ground: The Bennetts, Halliwell Cricket Ground
- Chairman: E. E. Goulding
| 1882–88 colours | 1889–90 colours | 1890–93 colours |

Halliwell F.C. was an English association football club based in Halliwell, in north-west Bolton.

== History ==
The club was an early member of the Lancashire Football Association and took part in the first Lancashire Senior Cup in 1879. Drawn to visit the strong Accrington side in the first round, Halliwell took a surprise lead, but went down 4–1; Halliwell was blamed for playing "very roughly", and injuring four of the home side, although only one player (Yates) had to leave the field, and even that was after slipping.

The club first took part in the FA Cup in 1882–83, winning 3–2 at Great Lever in the first round in front of over 4,000 spectators, in something of a shock result, as the Leverites had brought in Alf Jones and Evans from Walsall Swifts to boost their squad. In the second round, Halliwell lost 3–1 at Eagley.

=== Professionalism ===
For the 1883–84 season, the club sought players "from all over Lancashire", and had invested nearly £300 into making the ground "one of the best in Lancashire". These suggest that the club had turned professional, along with many other clubs from the county, backed by the local factories; Halliwell had patronage from a blue manufacturer, W. Edge & Sons. This caused problems for the club in competitions, because it was effectively barred from fielding its best players, as professionals were banned from them until 1885 and after then residency requirements sometimes stopped them from taking part. The club did enjoy its longest run in the Lancashire Senior Cup in 1882–83, winning through three rounds to the final 12 clubs, but it had the misfortune at that stage to be drawn to visit Blackburn Rovers, at that time the strongest side in England, and lost 4–0.

The club changed almost its entire playing roster for 1884–85, only four players being carried over, and importing 5 players from Scottish Cup semi-finalist Kilmarnock Athletic, plus two from Eagley. This enabled the club to field a first-class eleven in friendlies, but many of the players were ineligible for Cup competitions. Halliwell lost in the first round of the 1884-85, in a considerable surprise, to Lower Darwen; amongst Halliwell's earlier results that season was a 20–0 win at Southport Wanderers, on the same day as Lower Darwen were losing 5–0 to Preston Zingari. However the lack of Halliwell's star players reduced the attendance to a mere 50.

By 1885, the club was employing seven Scottish players - more than anyone in England other than Preston North End and Burnley. The club also had a deal in principle to sign Frank Sugg, but Burnley gazumped Halliwell for his signature, with Sugg being paid to be club secretary. The strength of the new side was demonstrated in the Lancashire Cup, as Halliwell held Preston North End to a 3–3 draw in the first round, with Preston relying on a late, and ostensibly offside, equalizer to force the draw; Preston duly won the replay.

In the 1885–86 FA Cup, the club was drawn against Fishwick Ramblers of Preston in the first round, and was initially suspended from the competition for fielding an Astley Bridge player in a friendly match without permission. However, on appeal, the FA lifted the suspension, and Halliwell won the tie 2–1, despite the FA's rules on professional eligibility requiring Halliwell to field mostly a reserve team. The same eligibility rules seemed to have cost the club in the second round, its reserves losing 3–1 at Hurst, but Halliwell's protest against the size of the Hurst pitch was upheld and a replay ordered. Rather than attend the replay, Hurst scratched, but it was a stay of execution for the Halliwellians, as a side which "consisted almost entirely of second eleven youngsters" lost 6–1 to South Shore, in front of a "mere handful" of spectators.

In the 1886–87 FA Cup the club was drawn away to Cup holders Blackburn Rovers in the first round; the Rovers had adopted professionalism before any of the other Lancashire clubs (other than Darwen F.C.) and had a considerable advantage from both the head-start and their players being grandfathered into the residency requirements. Halliwell, forced to drop six of their best players because of the regulations, scratched from the tie, and played the match as a friendly instead. The ability of the Halliwell full-strength side was shown by the Halliwellians managing a 3–3 draw against the Rovers.

The club also demonstrated its strength by winning the Bolton Charity Cup in 1886–87; the club gained a controversial 2–1 win over Bolton Wanderers in the semi-final at Pike's Lane, a Bolton goal being disallowed because the referee had already stopped play to award the Wanderers a free-kick; the Wanderers' protests on the basis that the goal should have been allowed, and on general official bias, were dismissed. The final - against Astley Bridge, at Pike's Lane - was something of an anti-climax, 2,000 spectators seeing goals in each half from Dewhurst and Mullin give the Halliwellians the Cup for the first (and only) time.

=== 1887–88 FA Cup ===
Halliwell's FA Cup run in 1887–88 involved two protests, one against the club, and one which did not involve the club at all, but could have affected it.

Halliwell beat Liverpool Stanley in the first round, going in at half-time 1–0 down, but a tactical switch for the second half - left-winger Weir swapping places with centre-forward Mullin, which forced Stanley to withdraw midfielder Goodall to cover him - saw Halliwell rattle in five without reply. In the second round, the club easily beat Astley Bridge. The Bridgeites protested that Halliwell's Hewitson was not qualified to play for Halliwell. Halliwell attended the hearing with Hewitson's birth certificate, the FA dismissed the protest, and ordered Astley Bridge to pay 2 guineas and Halliwell's expenses.

In the third round, the club was drawn to play Preston North End. Preston had beaten Everton in the second round. However, Bolton Wanderers, who had lost to Everton in the first round, had protested about Everton's players. The FA permitted Everton to play in the second round despite the protest. Preston duly beat Halliwell in the third round, but the Bolton protest was then upheld, retrospectively disqualifying Everton from the first round and making Preston's second round win over Everton null and void. Technically, this meant that the Preston-Halliwell tie was also a nullity, and the FA sent a telegram to Deepdale before the match stating that the game should be a friendly, but Sudell of Preston arranged with the FA that the match should still stand as a Cup tie, with Preston willing to play Bolton Wanderers should the Bolton protest be upheld. Given Halliwell had lost 10–1 to Preston in a friendly shortly before the tie, there was no protest from Halliwell as to this arrangement. Preston duly beat Halliwell 4–0 before beating Wanderers, and going on to the final.

=== The search for a league ===
The club was not one of those invited to join the initial Football League, given that Bolton Wanderers had been invited to represent the town, even though Wanderers secretary John Bentley suggested that Halliwell be invited. Halliwell therefore became one of the members of The Combination, although that attempt at a league struggled, with confusion over the fixtures, and the season fizzled out uncompleted. At the time the competition was abandoned, Halliwell had a mid-table record of 6 wins, 2 draws, and 5 defeats.

The club was of sufficient prominence to be one of the 16 exempted from the 1888–89 FA Cup qualifying rounds, and put straight through to the competition proper, but it went down in the final 16 stage to Birmingham St George's, the blame being put on goalkeeper Fairclough, who "mars his best work by absurd antics...he is eccentricity itself". It also reached the quarter-final of the Lancashire Cup for the first time, thanks to two startling wins - 8–1 against Bolton Wanderers and 9–4 against Burnley - although both opponents were fielding weakened sides thanks to Football League matches taking priority. In the quarter-final the club lost 1–0 to a first-choice Accrington side, after a tie abandoned with the scores 1–1. Accrington had turned up 40 minutes late for the replay, by which time (at the referee's direction) Halliwell had kicked off, scored, and claimed the tie. Accrington's late arrival was blamed on the train service, described as "as bad as the train service from here to Timbuctoo", and which had taken 2 hours to travel 18 miles. The Halliwell protest (which was also against the eligibility of an Accrington player) was dismissed.

In the aftermath of the collapse of The Combination, a number of clubs decided to form a more regular competition, the Football Alliance, for the 1889–90 season. Halliwell applied for membership but was one of three clubs which lost out in the vote. The club did not apply for membership of the Alliance again and instead was one of the 11 clubs which founded the Midland Football League, with representation on the committee. However, the club reconsidered its stance, and in May decided not to take part.

Without a league, the club was struggled, with the leagues taking away lucrative friendlies for the club; in April 1890 the club was even suspended for two weeks for playing a Crewe Alexandra player without permission. Halliwell did reach the Lancashire Cup quarter-final again, but this required only one win, and at that stage the club lost 4–1 to Higher Walton.

=== Reversion to amateurism ===
Before the 1890–91 season, with the club's finances suffering to the extent that the club treasurer sought to resign (not having produced a balance sheet for several years), the club turned amateur. It took over the Halliwell North End amateur side to replace the departing professionals. It was proposed as a member of the newly-revived Combination, this time being focussed on the north-west, but it did not join.

The club's final appearance in the FA Cup proper, in 1890–91, proved disastrous. After being drawn at home to The Wednesday, the club decided to forgo home advantage in return for "a considerable pecuniary consideration" from the Yorkshire side. The decision was a mistake on two grounds. Firstly, on the same day, Sheffield United was playing Notts County at Bramall Lane, which attracted a crowd of 10,000, with only 1,000 turning up to Owlerton; secondly, with home advantage, The Wednesday ran riot, scoring twice in the first ten minutes, five in the first half, and twelve by the end of the match. The club's last Lancashire Cup tie was perhaps even worse - banished to one of the three qualifying round ties, Halliwell went down at home to the unregarded Rossendale by 6 goals to 3.

With league football proving to be a success around the country, the club was a founder member of the Lancashire Combination in 1891. The degradation of Halliwell's status, and the change the Football League had wrought, was shown by the Combination being primarily for the benefit of the reserve sides of the clubs Halliwell had been playing as equals a few years before. Even this level was far too strong for the club, and in April 1892, having lost every match played (the last being a 4–0 loss at Royton on 2 April), the club announced that it could no longer fulfil its fixtures; the League therefore expelled the club and expunged its results.

=== End of the club ===
The club had basically wound up at the end of the 1891–92 season, but chairman Ebenezer Goulding - who also owned the tenancy for the ground - was able to put an XI together for the new year. This may have been an effort to clear debts - the club's financial state was such that other clubs played benefit matches to raise money for the club. An application to join the Lancashire Alliance was voted down.

The club's last FA Cup campaign was in 1892–93, beating West Manchester in the preliminary qualifying round, helped considerably by West having a Lancashire League match on the same day, which took priority, and Halliwell squeezed past West's reserves 4–3. The club went to Stockport County for the first qualifying round, losing 4–0, but successfully protested about the state of the Stockport pitch. Halliwell lost the replayed tie 4–2 and, apart from hosting fund-raising efforts, the club seems not to have been active again.

Goulding again announced a plan for a revival for the 1893–94 season, but nothing came of it. A junior club, Halliwell Rovers, eventually stepped up to represent the borough at senior level.

There was an odd aftermath late in 1893, in which the members of the Halliwell Cricket Club successfully sued Goulding for £3 10/- in damages, caused by Goulding employing a labourer to damage the cricket pitch crease, apparently out of spite as the cricket club had defeated Goulding's attempt to give notice to quit, and had instead bought out the lease.

== Colours ==
The club's original colours were navy blue jerseys, white knickers, and blue & white hose. In September 1882, the club adopted black jerseys and knickers "with gold stripe", with a white change jersey, and at the start of the 1884–85 season, the club's "new dress" was black and gold stripes, described as "waspish". The club donned a new set of yellow and black jerseys in January 1887, which gave the side the appearance of "bilious spiders".

For the Cup tie in 1889 with Birmingham St George's, the club adopted new "magenta-hued" jerseys, although this may have been a change kit, as the visiting side also wore white; other references in the season suggested that Halliwell were by now wearing "jerseys of pure white", "edged with blue", originally with "dark" knickers, but from 1889 white knickers. The old "spider" shirts were retained as a change kit. The white scheme did not last long - from 1890 the club adopted blue shirts.

== Ground ==
The club's ground was The Bennetts, one and a half miles from Bolton Station, or from Oaks Station. The ground was better known outside Lancashire as the Halliwell Cricket Ground and lay off Elgin Street, close to Bennett's Lane.

== Notable players ==
- Notable players ( 6 )

== Records ==
- Best FA Cup performance: 3rd Round, 1885–86, 1887–88
- Bolton Charity Cup: winner, 1886–87
