= British Football Association =

The British Football Association was a short lived ruling body for the game of football. It was set up in 1884 in response to the attitude of the Football Association to the issue of professionalism.

== History ==
Until the employment of professionals by Darwen and their success in reaching the quarter finals of the FA Cup in 1879, all teams had been amateur. There was a proposal by a London club before the match that any side not consisting entirely of amateurs should be barred from the Cup.

The FA Cup was initially contested by mostly southern, amateur teams but more professionally organised northern clubs began to dominate the competition during the early 1880s; "The turning point, north replacing south, working class defeating upper and professionals impinging upon the amateurs' territory, came in 1883." Hitherto, public school sides had played a dribbling game punctuated by violent tackles, but a new passing style developed in Scotland was successfully adopted by some Lancashire teams (some of which had hired Scottish players, referred to at the time as Scotch Professors), along with a more professional approach to training. Blackburn Olympic reached the final in March 1883 and defeated Old Etonians. In 1883 Accrington were expelled from the FA for paying players, while nearby Blackburn Rovers had also started to pay players, and the following season won the first of three consecutive FA Cups.

On 23 October 1884, a number of members of the Lancashire Football Association, at the instigation of Bolton Wanderers, met in Blackburn with a view to resisting new Football Association legislation restricting the ability of clubs to "import" players. It was resolved to hold a meeting in the Dog & Partridge in Manchester on 30 October and to invite "every club in the kingdom".

At that meeting, which included a number of very junior clubs in Lancashire, and only Aston Villa, Sunderland and Walsall Swifts of nationally prominent clubs outside the county, it was agreed to form a new association, the British Football Association. The clubs present set up a committee of 12 and discussed a barrister's opinion that the Football Association's rulings were invalid. One notable exception to the movement was Blackburn Rovers; in retaliation members of the BFA refused to allow players for its clubs to make guest appearances for the Rovers in friendlies.

The FA committee was sympathetic and put forward a motion in January 1885 to legalise professionalism; the motion was defeated by 113 votes to 108, but that had the effect of both checking any split from the BFA and, following a report in favour of professionalism in March, the FA voted in favour in July, by 35 votes to 12. This action by the FA was eventually to lead to the break-away and formation of the Amateur Football Association in 1907.

A similar split in rugby led to the separate sports of rugby union and rugby league.

== Member clubs ==
The following clubs were members of the BFA:

- Accrington *
- Accrington Grasshoppers
- Astley Bridge *
- Aston Villa
- Barnes Rovers
- Bell's Temperance
- Blackburn Park Road
- Bolton Association *
- Bolton Wanderers *
- Bradshaw
- Burnley *
- Burnley Ramblers
- Burnley Trinity
- Burnley Union Star *
- Burnley Wanderers
- Clitheroe *
- Church *
- Darcy Lever
- Great Lever *
- Hurst
- Halliwell *
- Kersley
- Little Halton
- Love Clough
- Manchester Association
- Newton Heath
- Nelson
- Padiham *
- Peel Bank Rovers
- Preston North End
- Preston Swifts
- Preston Zingari *
- Rawtenstall
- Rossendale
- Turton *
- Walmsley
- Wigan A.F.C.

[*] present at the initial meeting

Preston North End should have attended the first meeting, but the secretary sent apologies. Sunderland and Walsall Swifts attended the second meeting, and pledged to put the matter of joining to the respective club committees.
