= Gorton Villa F.C. =

Former association football club

Gorton Villa
- Full name: Gorton Villa Football Club
- Nickname(s): the Villa, the Villans
- Founded: 1883
- Dissolved: 1893
- Ground: 1883–87: Reddish Lane; 1887–88: Bull's Head Hotel; 1888–90: Church Lane; 1890–91: Abbey Hey Park; 1891–93: Chapman Lane
- Secretary: T. Buckley, W. G. Struthers, Tom Penny
Home colours

Gorton Villa F.C. was an association football club from Manchester which was a member of one of the early football leagues, The Combination, in the 1890s.

== History ==
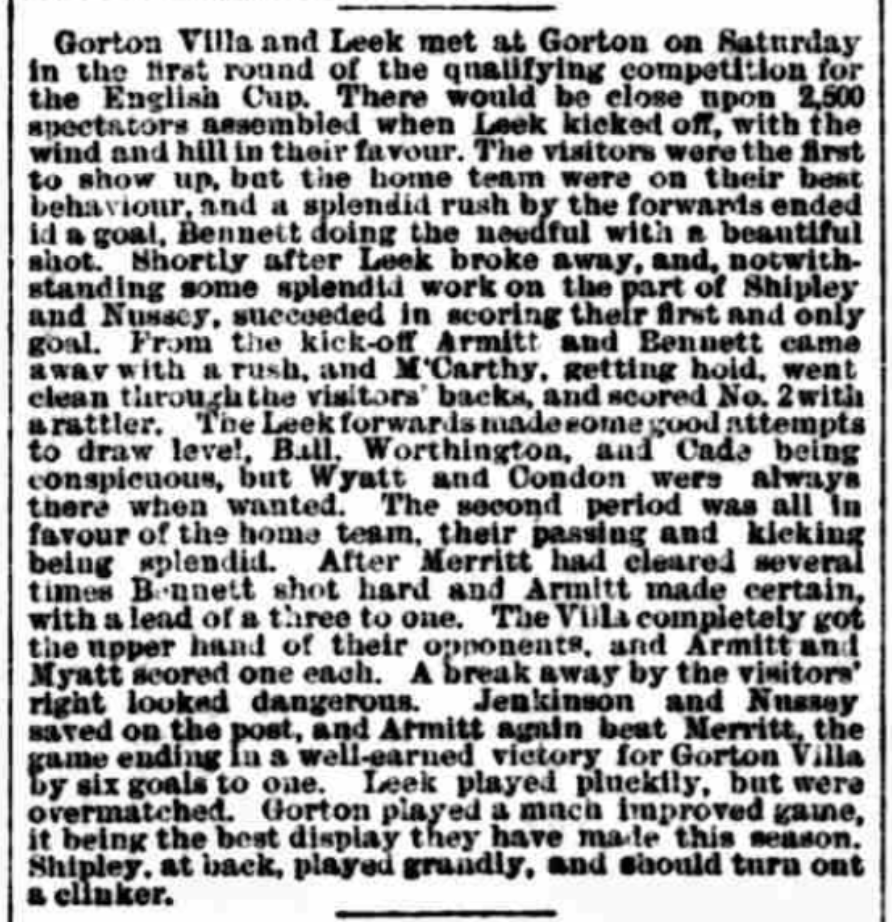
The club's biggest FA Cup win; 6–1 over Leek in the 1891–92 1st qualifying round, Athletic News, 5 October 1891

The club was founded in 1883, and its earliest recorded match came at the end of the year, a 2–0 home win over the second XI of the Newton Heath L&YR club; the match was shortened to 40 minutes because of a late start.

The club was a founder member of The Combination in 1890–91, in a major step-up, given the club's most notable achievement hitherto was reaching the quarter-final of the Manchester Senior Cup in 1886–87. When the fixtures were completed, the club was top of the table, with 24 points from 17 games, one clear of Macclesfield and six clear of Burton Swifts; however, not every match was played, and the Swifts, who had only played 14 matches, had a better goal average, so would have taken the title with wins in its games in hand. Nevertheless, the Villans were declared champions, although the celebration was muted as the club's first match as champion was a 4–1 defeat at Nelson.

The club had hoped to fly a championship flag (as was normal for champions of other competitions at the time) but, given the circumstances, the league did not arrange for one to be made. Worse for the Villa was that the club's latest ground move had proved cripplingly expensive, and the club had to undertake another move. At the end of the season, the club applied to join the Lancashire League, which had three vacancies to fill, but the Villans lost out to West Manchester (which was re-elected), South Shore, and Witton.

However, outside the local football, the club was not successful. It entered the qualifying stages of the FA Cup from 1888–89 to 1892–93, but never got beyond the second qualifying round; its status in the game, with the Football League becoming the star attraction, was shown by a 10–0 defeat to a weakened Bootle side in the club's final Cup tie.

The club was also stymied by the proximity of Ardwick and Fairfield, and, with the expense of two ground moves, the club was trapped in a vicious circle, from which it could not escape. Its defence of the Combination title in 1891–92 was mediocre at best, the club only earning 19 points in 22 matches and finishing 9th. The 1892–93 Combination season saw the club finish bottom, with five fewer points from the same number of games; the slightest of consolations was that the club won the final match it played, 3–2 at home to Chirk, in front of a crowd of 1,000.

As one last throw of the dice, the club tried to join the Lancashire League once more in June 1893, as Fairfield was one of the clubs having to apply for re-election; Fairfield was voted back in, and the Villa was left out. This was the final blow for the club. In August 1893, the nine members of the club committee voted to dissolve the club, with the personal debts of £21 each incurred being defrayed thanks to Fairfield agreeing to stage a friendly. The Villa support duly decanted to Ardwick and Fairfield in the wake of the club's dissolution.

== Colours ==
The club gave its colours as black, white, and blue; in context this refers to black and white shirts and blue knickers.

== Ground ==
The club originally played at Reddish Lane. In 1887, it started on a peripatetic existence, by securing "a good, enclosed ground behind the Bull's Head Hotel, Reddish".

In 1888, the club moved to Church Lane, with the Chapel House Hotel for facilities. Its first match at its new ground was a 2–0 defeat by Bolton Wanderers. Its tenure there was short-lived - in 1890 the club moved to Abbey Hey Park, opening with a win over Hyde in front of 3,000 spectators.

The expense however was significant and after just one season the club moved to a ground at Chapman Street, having to host matches there before the pitch was even ready.

== Honours ==
The Combination

- Champion: 1890–91

== Notable players ==
- Billy Struthers, forward and club secretary in the late 1880s and early 1890s, formerly of Bolton Wanderers, and who once scored 5 for the Trotters in an FA Cup tie
- Robert Watson, forward, signed from Everton in 1889
