= Rawtenstall F.C. =

Rawtenstall
- Full name: Rawtenstall Football Club
- Founded: 1879
- Dissolved: 1898
- Ground: Burnley Road
Home colours

Rawtenstall Football Club was a football club based in the Rawtenstall, in the Rossendale borough of Lancashire, England.

== History ==
The club joined the Lancashire Football Association after the 1881–82 season, and first entered the FA Cup in 1884-85. The club was drawn to play South Shore in the first round. However, the Football Association and some of the professional teams in Lancashire had fallen out over the issue of whether to allow players to be paid, and Rawtenstall had joined the nascent British Football Association, It therefore had to forfeit the tie.

It was a bold move for the club, as its chances of prospering against many much bigger professional clubs were slim, but several junior clubs had joined the BFA, and the combined effort and risk of a permanent split reconciled the FA to permitting professionals. The club was therefore able to take more of a part the following season, being drawn against Rangers in the first round. Once more football politics delayed the club's debut, the Scottish Football Association banning its members from taking part in the FA Cup and the Light Blues having to withdraw.

The club's second round tie saw it eliminated in bizarre circumstances. The club was drawn at home to "Bolton Swifts", which was the Bolton Wanderers reserve eleven. For fear of transgressing the FA's rules on player eligibility, Bolton's reserve side took part in the Cup, while the Wanderers indulged in lucrative friendlies. The day of the Cup tie, 21 November 1885, Wanderers played Burnley, while the reserves went to Rawtenstall, whose ground had " a great incline and was in a bad state", and turned out to be 10 yards too short to host a Cup tie. After the game ended 3–3, Bolton put in a successful appeal, on the basis that, not only was the pitch too small, but Rawtenstall had played five ineligible professionals.

The club's best run in the Lancashire Senior Cup came in 1884–85, reaching the quarter-finals (fifth round), where the club earned a startling 2–2 draw with Blackburn Rovers, albeit Rovers being weakened by having three men playing in the North v South representative match the same day; it could even have been a shock win but for a late own goal. Rawtenstall took an early lead in the replay before going down 4–1. Despite the underdogs' heroics, the Blackburn public was not interested in the replay, the crowd being a minuscule 600.

In the 1886–87 FA Cup, Rawtenstall held Church to a surprising draw in the first round, but, forced to play the replay at Haslingden Association, went down 7–1. There was some comfort in the combined attendance of the ties being 4,000.

The club's last tie in the main draw was a 3–1 defeat at home to Darwen in 1887–88. The following year, the FA brought in qualifying rounds, and a first round defeat to Rossendale was the club's final match in the competition. The impact the Football League had on clubs outside it is shown by Rawtenstall's gate receipts falling from £200 to £104 for the 1888–89 season.

=== Local league years ===
In 1889–90, Rawtenstall was one of the 14 clubs which founded the Lancashire League; it was simultaneously a founder member of the North-East Lancashire League. The first Lancashire League season was a difficult one, the club finishing second from bottom with 7 wins from 24 matches (Earlestown was expelled for not fulfilling its fixtures), but by 1891–92 the club was finishing 4th, with two future Football League clubs (Bury and Blackpool) finishing above it.

In 1894, the North-East league was merged into the Lancashire Combination, and Rawtenstall continued as a Combination member; in 1894–95 the club reached the final of the Lancashire Junior Cup for the only time, played at Gigg Lane, conceding a late goal to lose 1–0 to Lytham. After the 1896–97 season, despite optimism at the annual board meeting, the club resigned from the competition, and joined the lower status North-East Lancashire Combination. This caused serious problems for the club, as the Football Association refused permission for the League to affiliate to the Lancashire Football Association; as a result, Rawtenstall, affiliated individually to the Lancashire FA, was temporarily unable to play League matches after November 1897.

After a 4–0 defeat at Chesterfield in April 1898 there is no further record of the club.

== Colours ==
The club's original colours were red and white. By 1885 the club had changed to yellow, black, and red stripes; its change kit was red.

== Ground ==
The club originally played at a ground on Cemetery Road. By 1887 it was playing at the Burnley Road ground, using the White Lion inn for facilities.
