= Peel Bank Rovers F.C. =

Defunct English association football club

- Full name: Peel Bank Rovers Football Club
- Founded: 1879
- Dissolved: 1897
- Ground: Peel Bank
- Secretary: M. Hargreaves

Peel Bank Rovers F.C. was an association football club from Church, Lancashire.

== History ==
The earliest reference to the club is from the 1879–80 season. It was closely associated with the Turkey Red Printing Works of F. Steiner & Co, and in origin was a feeder club for Church F.C.

The Peelers played in the Lancashire Senior Cup from 1882–83 to 1885–86, and was one of the clubs involved in setting up the professional British Football Association. The club's best Senior Cup run was in its first entry; the club reached the last 12, at which stage it lost 7–0 at a largely second-choice Bolton Wanderers. The club then stepped back to the Lancashire Junior Cup, its best performance being to the semi-final in 1889–90; at the last 4 stage, the club faced Bury at Heywood Central's ground, and took the lead, but Bury fought back strongly to win 6–2. The club did have success at a more local level, winning the Accrington Charity Cup in 1884–85, 1888–89, 1889–90, and the last incarnation of the competition in 1894–95. Owing to unforeseen circumstances, the players did not receive their medals for the last success until 11 years afterwards, when the cup was brought out of storage for an Accrington schools competition.

The club was a founder member of the North-east Lancashire League in 1889, and in 1891 changed its name to Church, now that the town name was available following the disbanding of the original Church F.C., but the name change only lasted one season, the club reverting to Peel Bank Rovers in May 1892.

After the 1893–94 season, the league was absorbed into the Lancashire League, but the Peelers did not join; instead it joined the Blackburn and District League, and in 1896–97 tried its luck in the North-east Lancashire Combination, but finished bottom of the table, and there is no further record of the club.

== Ground ==
The club's Peel Bank ground was notorious for a steep slope.

== Nickname ==
The club was nicknamed the Steiner or Steiney Lads, after the club's effective patron. The media also referred to the club by various puns on the club name, such as Peelers, Peelites, and Bankers.

== Notable players ==
- Jimmy Whitehead, who started his career with Peel Bank before joining Accrington in 1890, and earning two England caps
