= Goldenhill Wanderers F.C. =

Goldenhill Wanderers
- Full name: Goldenhill Wanderers Football Club
- Nickname: Wanderers
- Founded: 1875
- Dissolved: 2011
- Ground: Shelford Road
- League: Staffordshire County Senior League Division 2
- 2017-18: 2nd
Home colours

Goldenhill Wanderers F.C. was an English association football club, from Goldenhill, Stoke-on-Trent, Staffordshire.

== History ==
The club was founded in 1875 under the name Goldenhill and competed in the English FA Cup during the 1880s. In the club's early days, the media occasionally referred to the team as Golden Hill. The club participated in the Staffordshire Senior Cup from 1878; in its first match in the competition, the club lost to Stoke. In the April 1880–81 Staffordshire Cup, Aston Villa beat Goldenhill on the road to final. Despite the presence in the competition in the 1880s of a number of teams that would eventually join the Football League (as far south as West Bromwich Albion), the village club once reached the semi-finals. From around 1895 the club is variously referred to as Goldenhill or Goldenhill Wanderers and by 1900 the name Goldenhill Wanderers is established.

=== FA Cup ===
Goldenhill's first FA Cup entry was in 1884–85 and the club lost in the first round to Wrexham Olympic to a last-minute goal, which Goldenhill alleged was scored directly from a corner, and therefore, under the laws at the time, illegitimate.

The club's next two entries into the competition were full of controversy. In the first round in 1885–86, the team was drawn to play Davenham, at the latter's home ground; Goldenhill walked off when the referee awarded a goal to Davenham just before half-time when Goldenhill thought they should have had a throw-in. The referee recorded the final score as being 3–1.

In 1886–87, the club's first round tie with Macclesfield generated even more controversy. Macclesfield did not turn up on time, so Goldenhill kicked off and claimed the match; when Macclesfield did turn up, the Cheshire club protested the size and state of the pitch; near the end of the 90 minutes, with the score 4–2 to Goldenhill, the Silkmen walked off the pitch in protest at the rough play of Goldenhill. The FA upheld Macclesfield's protests and ordered a replay, which took place at Westwood Lane, the home ground of Leek. The game ended 2–2 and the teams agreed to play an extra half-an-hour, in which Goldenhill scored a winning goal.

In the second round, the club played at Chester and lost 1–0 in front of a crowd of 1,000. However Goldenhill protested that the Cestrians had played four ineligible players. The FA found that Chester had registered the players 2 days before the match, which was too late for them to be eligible to play, so FA upheld the protest, putting Goldenhill into the third round, where they were drawn to play Chirk A.A.A. The match never took place as Chester had put in a counter-protest regarding two of Goldenhill's players, which the FA considered at a later date, and also upheld, which gave Chirk a walkover into the fourth round.

The club did not enter the FA Cup again, and, surrounded by professional teams, retreated to the junior ranks.

=== Leagues ===
The club was a member of various Staffordshire leagues (including the North Staffordshire District in the 1890s), and withdrew from the Staffordshire County Regional League after the 2010–11 season.

=== Revival of name ===
Stoke-based Wetley Victoria changed its name to Goldenhill Wanderers in 2015–16, but this club dissolved before the 2019–20 season.

== Colours ==
The club played in amber and black stripes in the 1880s, with either white or navy knickerbockers. In the 20th century the club generally wore blue shirts and white shorts.

== Ground ==
The club originally played at the Sandyford Cricket Ground on Shelford Road.

== Records ==
- Best FA Cup performance: 2nd or 3rd round, 1886–87
- Staffordshire FA Senior Vase winners, 1982–83

== Notable players ==
- Tommy Clare, England international and Stoke's first professional footballer
- James Bradley, League title winner with Liverpool
- Bob Whittingham, future Stoke and Chelsea player
- Alan Dodd, future Stoke player
- Peter Coates, bet365 owner
