= 1885–86 FA Cup =

English football tournament

Tournament details
- Country: England; Scotland; Wales
- Teams: 130

Final positions
- Champions: Blackburn Rovers (3rd title)
- Runners-up: West Bromwich Albion

The 1885–86 Football Association Challenge Cup was the 15th edition of the FA Cup, England's oldest football tournament. There were 130 entrants, fourteen more than in the previous season, although six teams did not play a match. Five Scottish clubs entered but one was eliminated in the first round in an all-Scottish tie and travel constraints caused the rest to withdraw.

Blackburn Rovers became the second team to win the competition in three successive seasons and, as of 2024, they remain the last to do so. The final between Blackburn and West Bromwich Albion is the earliest to have been contested by two extant clubs that are still members of either the Premier League or the English Football League.

== First round ==
Notes. In all rounds, a walkover means the tie was not played and the first-named team progressed to the next round. If a match was declared void for any reason, a replay was necessary.

Home	Score	Away	Date
Darlington	bye		
Walsall Swifts	bye		
Darwen	2–2	Derby Junction	31 October 1885
Dulwich	1–2	South Reading	31 October 1885
Preston North End	walkover	Great Lever	
Stoke	2–2	Crewe Alexandra	31 October 1885
Barnes	1–7	Lancing Old Boys	31 October 1885
Royal Engineers	1–5	Old Foresters	31 October 1885
Marlow	3–0	Luton Town	31 October 1885
Clapham Rovers	12–0	1st Surrey Rifles	31 October 1885
Queen's Park (Scotland)	5–1	Partick Thistle (Scotland)	31 October 1885
Upton Park	4–2	United London Scottish	24 October 1885
Old Etonians	walkover	Bournemouth Rovers	
Swifts	7–1	Casuals	31 October 1885
Rochester	6–1	Reading	31 October 1885
Old Wykehamists	5–0	Uxbridge	31 October 1885
Old Harrovians	walkover	St James (Forest Gate)	
Notts County	15–0	Rotherham Town	24 October 1885
Hendon	0–4	Clapton	24 October 1885
Nottingham Forest	6–2	Mellors Limited	31 October 1885
Brentwood	3–0	Maidenhead	31 October 1885
Hanover United	1–1	Romford	31 October 1885
Stafford Road	7–0	Matlock	31 October 1885
Blackburn Olympic	4–2 match void	Church	31 October 1885
Astley Bridge	3–2	Southport	31 October 1885
Staveley	1–1	Mexborough	31 October 1885
Small Heath Alliance	9–2	Burton Wanderers	31 October 1885
Sheffield Heeley	2–1	Eckington Works	19 October 1885
Bolton Wanderers	6–0	Eagley	17 October 1885
Accrington	5–4	Witton	17 October 1885
Wednesbury Old Athletic	5–1	Burton Swifts	31 October 1885
Lockwood Brothers	2–2	Notts Rangers	31 October 1885
Chatham	0–2	Old Carthusians	31 October 1885
Walsall Town	0–5	Aston Villa	17 October 1885
Clitheroe	0–2	Blackburn Rovers	24 October 1885
Halliwell	2–1	Fishwick Ramblers	31 October 1885
Macclesfield Town	4–1	Northwich Victoria	31 October 1885
Old Westminsters	3–1	Hotspur	31 October 1885
Redcar	3–0	Sunderland	24 October 1885
Wolverhampton Wanderers	7–0	Derby St Luke's	31 October 1885
Rossendale	6–2	Low Moor	24 October 1885
Birmingham Excelsior	1–2	Derby Midland	31 October 1885
Davenham	2–1	Goldenhill	31 October 1885
Hurst	2–1 match void	Bradshaw	31 October 1885
Long Eaton Rangers	2–0	The Wednesday	31 October 1885
Middlesbrough	walkover	Horncastle	
West Bromwich Albion	4–1	Aston Unity	31 October 1885
Padiham	walkover	Heart of Midlothian (Scotland)	
Hartford St John's	1–3	Newtown (Wales)	24 October 1885
Leek	6–3	Wrexham Olympic (Wales)	31 October 1885
Newark	0–3	Sheffield	31 October 1885
Nottingham Wanderers	2–2	Notts Olympic	31 October 1885
Derby County	3–0	Mitchell St George's	31 October 1885
Old Brightonians	2–1	Acton	31 October 1885
Darwen Old Wanderers	11–0	Burnley	17 October 1885
Rawtenstall	walkover	Rangers (Scotland)	
Lincoln City	0–2	Grimsby Town	31 October 1885
Luton Wanderers	3–2	Chesham	31 October 1885
Oswaldtwistle Rovers	3–1	Lower Darwen	31 October 1885
Stafford Rangers	1–4	Druids (Wales)	31 October 1885
Higher Walton	3–4	South Shore	17 October 1885
Bollington	0–5	Oswestry	24 October 1885
Burslem Port Vale	3–0	Chirk (Wales)	24 October 1885
Lincoln Lindum	4–0	Grimsby & District	17 October 1885
Third Lanark (Scotland)	4–2	Blackburn Park Road	17 October 1885
Gainsborough Trinity	4–1	Grantham	24 October 1885

=== Replays ===
Home	Score	Away	Date
Darwen	4–0	Derby Junction	7 November 1885
Crewe Alexandra	1–0	Stoke	7 November 1885
Romford	3–0	Hanover United	7 November 1885
Church	2–2	Blackburn Olympic	4 November 1885
Staveley	walkover	Mexborough	
Notts Rangers	4–0	Lockwood Brothers	7 November 1885
Bradshaw	1–1 match void	Hurst	4 November 1885
Notts Olympic	4–1	Notts Wanderers	7 November 1885

=== Second replays ===
Home	Score	Away	Date
Church	3–1	Blackburn Olympic	9 November 1885
Hurst	3–2	Bradshaw	9 November 1885

== Second round ==
Home	Score	Away	Date
Preston North End	11–3	Astley Bridge	18 November 1885
Marlow	6–1	Old Etonians	21 November 1885
Clapham Rovers	bye		
Swifts	5–1	Rochester	21 November 1885
Druids (Wales)	2–2	Burslem Port Vale	21 November 1885
Old Wykehamists	10–0	Luton Wanderers	21 November 1885
Old Harrovians	2–1	Old Foresters	21 November 1885
Notts County	8–0	Sheffield	21 November 1885
Nottingham Forest	4–1	Notts Olympic	21 November 1885
Romford	bye		
Brentwood	6–1	Lancing Old Boys	14 November 1885
Blackburn Rovers	1–0	Oswaldtwistle Rovers	21 November 1885
Old Carthusians	6–0	Upton Park	21 November 1885
Small Heath Alliance	3–1	Darwen	14 November 1885
Sheffield Heeley	1–6	Notts Rangers	21 November 1885
Grimsby Town	8–0	Darlington	21 November 1885
South Shore	walkover	Queen's Park (Scotland)	
Church	walkover	Third Lanark (Scotland)	
Oswestry	1–1	Crewe Alexandra	21 November 1885
South Reading	1–1	Clapton	21 November 1885
Old Westminsters	3–0	Old Brightonians	21 November 1885
Redcar	2–0	Lincoln Lindum	21 November 1885
Wolverhampton Wanderers	4–2	Stafford Road	21 November 1885
Rossendale	9–1	Padiham	21 November 1885
Derby Midland	1–3	Walsall Swifts	21 November 1885
Davenham	8–1	Macclesfield Town	21 November 1885
Hurst	3–1 match void	Halliwell	18 November 1885
Long Eaton Rangers	1–4	Staveley	21 November 1885
West Bromwich Albion	3–2	Wednesbury Old Athletic	21 November 1885
Leek	walkover	Newtown (Wales)	
Derby County	2–0	Aston Villa	14 November 1885
Darwen Old Wanderers	2–1	Accrington	21 November 1885
Rawtenstall	3–3; Rawtenstall disqualified	Bolton Wanderers	21 November 1885
Gainsborough Trinity	1–2	Middlesbrough	21 November 1885

=== Replays ===
Home	Score	Away	Date
Burslem Port Vale	5–1	Druids (Wales)	28 November 1885
Crewe Alexandra	Oswestry disqualified	Oswestry	
South Reading	Clapton disqualified	Clapton	
Halliwell	walkover	Hurst	

== Third round ==
Home	Score	Away	Date
Marlow	both teams disqualified	Old Wykehamists	
Swifts	Old Harrovians disqualified	Old Harrovians	
Notts County	3–0	Notts Rangers	12 December 1885
Brentwood	bye		
Blackburn Rovers	6–1	Darwen Old Wanderers	5 December 1885
Old Carthusians	bye		
Staveley	2–1	Nottingham Forest	12 December 1885
Small Heath Alliance	4–2	Derby County	12 December 1885
Bolton Wanderers	2–3; Preston North End disqualified	Preston North End	12 December 1885
Church	5–1	Rossendale	12 December 1885
Halliwell	1–6	South Shore	19 December 1885
South Reading	Clapham Rovers disqualified	Clapham Rovers	
Old Westminsters	5–1	Romford	12 December 1885
Redcar	bye		
Wolverhampton Wanderers	2–1	Walsall Swifts	12 December 1885
Davenham	2–1	Crewe Alexandra	12 December 1885
Middlesbrough	2–1	Grimsby Town	19 December 1885
West Bromwich Albion	bye		
Leek	2–3 match void	Burslem Port Vale	19 December 1885

=== Replay ===
Home	Score	Away	Date
Burslem Port Vale	walkover	Leek	

=== Disqualifications ===
Marlow, Old Wykehamists, Old Harrovians, and Clapham Rovers were all disqualified for not turning up for matches, thinking that a deep frost would make the respective pitches unplayable; the Association had no sympathy, declaring that the clubs were at fault for arranging the fixtures on the last possible date of completion. Preston North End was disqualified for fielding an ineligible player (George Drummond).

== Fourth round ==
Home	Score	Away	Date
Swifts	bye		
Notts County	bye		
Blackburn Rovers	bye		
Old Carthusians	bye		
Staveley	bye		
Small Heath Alliance	bye		
Bolton Wanderers	bye		
South Shore	bye		
Church	bye		
South Reading	0–3	Brentwood	2 January 1886
Old Westminsters	bye		
Redcar	bye		
Davenham	bye		
Middlesbrough	bye		
West Bromwich Albion	3–1	Wolverhampton Wanderers	2 January 1886
Burslem Port Vale	bye		

== Fifth round ==
Home	Score	Away	Date
Blackburn Rovers	7–1	Staveley	23 January 1886
South Shore	2–1	Notts County	23 January 1886
Church	2–6	Swifts	16 January 1886
Old Westminsters	Bolton Wanderers disqualified	Bolton Wanderers	
Redcar and Coatham	2–1	Middlesbrough	23 January 1886
Davenham	1–2	Small Heath Alliance	16 January 1886
West Bromwich Albion	1–0	Old Carthusians	23 January 1886
Burslem Port Vale	2–1 match void	Brentwood	16 January 1886

=== Replay ===
Home	Score	Away	Date
Brentwood	3–3	Burslem Port Vale	30 January 1886

=== Second replay ===
Home	Score	Away	Date
Brentwood	walkover	Burslem Port Vale	

=== Disqualification ===
Bolton Wanderers was disqualified for fielding an ineligible player (Jack Powell) in their victory over Preston North End in the third round; the hearing of the Preston protest had been delayed until after the draw for the fifth round.

== Sixth round ==
Home	Score	Away	Date
Brentwood	1–3	Blackburn Rovers	27 February 1886
Small Heath Alliance	2–0	Redcar	13 February 1886
South Shore	1–2	Swifts	13 February 1886
West Bromwich Albion	6–0	Old Westminsters	13 February 1886

== Semi-finals ==
	Score		Date	Venue
Blackburn Rovers	2–1	Swifts	13 March 1886	County Cricket Ground, Derby
West Bromwich Albion	4–0	Small Heath Alliance	6 March 1886	Aston Lower Grounds, Birmingham

== Final ==
	Score		Date	Venue
Blackburn Rovers	0–0	West Bromwich Albion	3 April 1886	Kennington Oval, London

=== Replay ===
	Score		Date	Venue
Blackburn Rovers	2–0	West Bromwich Albion	10 April 1886	Racecourse Ground, Derby
