= Church F.C. =

English association football club

Church
- Full name: Church Football Club
- Nicknames: Scarlets, the Turkey Reds
- Founded: 1874
- Dissolved: 1888
- Ground: Spring Hill
- Secretary: R. Horrocks (1885), B. Robinson (1886)
Home colours

Church Football Club was an English association football club based in Church, Lancashire, which once reached the quarter-finals of the FA Cup. The club originally played at the Church cricket ground, moving to Spring Hill in the early 1880s. The club is notable for being the first opponents of Blackburn Rovers in December 1875.

== History ==
The club was an early member of the Lancashire Football Association and played in the first Lancashire Senior Cup in 1879–80, beating Blackburn St Andrew's in the first round but losing to Manchester Wanderers in the second.

The club's first FA Cup tie was in the 1882–83 competition, beating Clitheroe 5–0 in front of a thousand spectators. After receiving a bye in the second round, the club's third round tie at home to Darwen brought in a crowd of 2–3,000 and Church surprisingly won the replay in front of an even bigger crowd, inflicting the first defeat of the season on the Darreners. The club's run ended in the fourth round at home to eventual winners Blackburn Olympic in front of "several thousand" spectators.

Church were twice expelled from the Lancashire Senior Cup, in 1883–84 and 1884–85, for fielding ineligible players, both times after protests from neighbours Accrington.

The club's best national run came in 1884–85. The club now had the benefit of a new stand, seating 700, which increased the club's income. In the first round Church beat Hurst with a goal in the last two minutes. In the second round against South Shore of Blackpool, James Beresford gave Church the lead inside ten seconds; although the club went 2–1 down, Crawford scored an equaliser in the last minute, and the clubs agreed to play an extra half-hour, in which Crawford scored the winner. The third round saw the club's biggest win, 10–0 against the original Southport, the score being 8–0 at half-time. This raised the club's profile enough that it was in demand for friendly matches in Scotland; in May 1885 Church beat St Mirren and in May 1887 the club played Partick Thistle and Hibernian on consecutive days. 3,500-4,000 saw the club beat Darwen in the fourth round to reach the last eight, with special trains being run to bring the visiting supporters to the village. The quarter-final with the Old Carthusians was also played in front of a crowd of 4,000, which was not far short of the village's population, but the Charterhouse side won with a breakaway goal in the second half.

The following year, the club looked like it had been eliminated in the first round, losing 4–2 at Blackburn Olympic, but the Light Blues' goalkeeper Jack Southworth had been ineligible for the tie, and the FA ordered a replay, at Church's ground. The replayed game ended in a draw, despite Olympic being under strength as replacement goalkeeper Hacking (from Blackburn Law) could not attend due to a family bereavement, and in the replay at the Hole-i'the-Wall ground Church scored three times in twelve minutes to go through.

The last FA Cup tie for the club was a 2–0 defeat to Darwen on 5 November 1887, with both sides fielding eleven Lancastrians, and a shortage of players requiring Church's coach, Hartley Gregson, to come out of his recent retirement to make up the numbers. There had been some confusion over the club's first round tie with the Belfast side Cliftonville, who had not turned up on the due date, with Church arranging for Clitheroe to take part in a hastily arranged friendly. The club finished the season with a £10 profit on an income of £356, having had a full season's worth of matches against prestigious opposition such as Everton, Accrington, Darwen, Bootle, Birmingham St George's, and Port Vale .

=== Extinction ===
The club suffered two blows at the end of the 1887–88 season. Firstly, the formation of the Football League reduced the opportunities for Church to play against neighbouring sides, and the cartel nature of the League meant that there were more attractive fixtures on most Saturdays within a short distance. Accrington's ground was 2 miles away, Blackburn Rovers' Ewood Park 6 miles, both Preston North End and Burnley were within 15 miles, and Darwen, soon to join the League, had a ground less than 10 miles distant; this meant it was impossible for a village side with a tight geographical following to afford to compete. Secondly, before the start of the new season, the club lost its ground to development. The upshot was the club was broken up.

In 1891, Peel Bank Rovers, playing in the North-East Lancashire League, changed its name to Church F.C..

== FA Cup record ==
- 1882-83
  - Round 1: Clitheroe (H) won 5–0
  - Round 2: bye
  - Round 3: Darwen (H) drew 2-2, (A) won 2–0
  - Round 4: Blackburn Olympic (A) lost 0–4
- 1883-84
  - Round 1: Darwen (H) drew 2-2, (A) lost 0–1
- 1884-85
  - Round 1: Hurst (A) won 3–2
  - Round 2: South Shore (A) won 3–2
  - Round 3: Southport Central (H) won 10–0
  - Round 4: Darwen (H) won 3–0
  - Round 5: bye
  - Round 6 (q-f): Old Carthusians (H) lost 0–1
- 1885-86
  - Round 1: Blackburn Olympic (A) original match void, (H) drew 2-2, (A) won 3–1
  - Round 2: Third Lanark (H) walked over
  - Round 3: Rossendale (H) won 5–1
  - Round 4: bye
  - Round 5: Swifts (H) lost 2–6
- 1886–87
  - Round 1: Rawtenstall (H) drew 1-1, (A) won 7–1
  - Round 2: Rangers (A) lost 1–2
- 1887–88
  - Round 1: Cliftonville (H) walked over
  - Round 2: Darwen (A) lost 0–3

== Colours ==
The first recorded colours for the club were in the 1878–79 season, described as black and white striped jerseys (which, at the time, referred to hoops), and white knickers. For the 1882–83 season the club had changed to white shirts and red knickers; the unusual choice of colour of shorts was noted upon in the media more than most colour choices in the era, even giving rise to a media nickname. The supply of colour for the knickers came from the Turkey red dye factory of Messrs. Steiner and Co., the club's patron, which also gave the club the alternative nickname of the Turkey Reds.

== Ground ==
The club originally played at the Church cricket ground. By 1885 it had moved to Spring Hill.
