= Lower Darwen F.C. =

Lower Darwen
- Full name: Lower Darwen Football Club
- Nickname(s): the Darweners, the Villagers
- Founded: 1877
- Dissolved: 1887
- Ground: Leys Meadow, Branch Road
- Secretary: Joseph Neville, Paul Rawlinson (1883–85)
Home colours

Lower Darwen F.C. was an English association football club from the village of Lower Darwen in Lancashire.

== History ==
The club was a founder member of the Lancashire Football Association and played in the first Lancashire Cup in 1879–80, beating Darwen Rangers and Livesey United, before losing to Accrington in the third round. The club also reached the third round in 1881–82, when there were hopes that the club could win the entire competition; however the Darweners lost 9–0 at Bolton Wanderers. Despite this, left-winger George Brindle had attracted the interest of Darwen F.C. and only a concerted effort from the villagers prevented him from moving. Brindle did occasionally play for the "upper" club in friendlies, in return for which Darwen hosted a friendly with Lower Darwen three weeks after the Bolton thrashing, all receipts of which would go to the smaller club; Darwen also lent goalkeeper Massey to Lower Darwen for the game "by which the custodian of the Darwen team would receive a lot of practice". Although Lower Darwen lost 5–0, the club gained £17 in gate receipts. Brindle himself remained with Lower Darwen until the club's final season.

The club's most notable scalp was Preston North End in the Lancashire Cup in 1882–83, Lower Darwen winning 2–0 away from home, albeit because Preston were banned from fielding their sub rosa professional players in the competition.

=== FA Cup ===
The club entered the FA Cup on four occasions, from 1882–83 to 1885–86. Its best run came in 1884–85, when it beat Halliwell at home and Darwen Old Wanderers away, in the first and third rounds, as well as receiving a bye in the second, before losing to Chatham in the fourth round which, because of the uneven nature of the geographical early rounds, consisted of 18 clubs.

The club's win over Halliwell was a considerable surprise (amongst Halliwell's earlier results that season was a 20–0 win at Southport, on the same day as Lower Darwen were losing 5–0 to Preston Zingari), and was helped by a Football Association ruling regarding "imported" players which cost Halliwell its best men. As a consequence the attendance was a mere 50. By contrast, 5,000 saw the tie at Chatham, in which Lower Darwen had started the favourites; after the match the club protested that the referee had ended the game four minutes too soon, but the protest was rejected.

=== Decline ===
The pressures of trying to compete, as a small village club, with the newly created professionals, especially in an area already saturated with football clubs (Blackburn was a five-minute train ride from Lower Darwen), meant that the club fell behind the other clubs in the neighbourhood. By 1887 the club had ceased its membership with the Football Association and its final match in the Lancashire Cup, in the first round in 1887–88, was a disaster; the club was annihilated by Accrington by the score of twenty goals to one.

The club recovered enough from that defeat to continue playing friendlies, but another hammering - 13–2 at Higher Walton, conceding nine without reply in the second half - in December seems to have killed off the last remnants of interest in keeping the club going. The only reference to a Lower Darwen club afterwards (in 1894) probably refers to the Lower Darwen St James' club that was active in the mid-1890s.

== Colours ==
The club's colours were dark blue and white jersey and hose, with blue knickers.

== Ground ==
The club played at the Leys Meadow, using either the Swan Inn or the Railway Inn for facilities.
