= The Combination =

- Organising body: FA
- Founded: 1888 (first incarnation); 1890 (second incarnation)
- First season: 1888-89
- Folded: 5 April 1889 (first incarnation); 1911 (second incarnation)
- Country: England; Wales
- Number of clubs: 20
- Domestic cup: FA Cup
- Last champions: Whitchurch F.C. (3rd title)
- Most championships: Everton reserves (6 titles)

The Combination was a league during the early days of English football. It had two incarnations; the first ran only for the 1888–89 season for teams across Northern England and the Midlands, and was disbanded before completion. The second was created for the 1890–91 season, but persisted until it was defunct in 1911. The league comprised teams primarily from North West England and later Wales.

The league should not be confused with the other former Football Combination, a competition for reserve teams from the South of England, or with the Lancashire Combination, another minor league operating around the same time.

== First incarnation ==
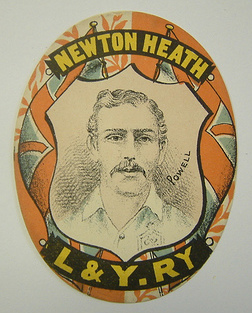
Sharpe's Card c 1890 depicting Jack Powell as captain of Newton Heath

The first Combination was set up in 1888, the same year the Football League was founded. It was established by clubs that had been excluded from the Football League, initiated by Crewe Alexandra secretary J. G. Hall, and was announced at the Royal Hotel in Crewe. The clubs in attendance were Small Heath Alliance, Walsall Town Swifts, Derby Midland, Notts Rangers, Burslem Port Vale, Leek, Crewe Alexandra, Newton Heath, Witton, and Blackburn Olympic; three other clubs, Mitchell St George's, Halliwell, and Derby Junction, all wrote to pledge acceptance of all decisions, and Northwich Victoria also wrote requesting membership. The meeting was chaired by A. M. Sloane, the chairman of Bootle. The clubs agreed that there would be no more than 20 members and each would play at least 8 matches home and away. Harry Mitchell of St George's was elected president.

However, while the Football League quickly proved a success, the Combination lacked central organisation, with poor planning and unfulfilled fixtures; as early as October the media was complaining about the difficulties in following the competition and by January 1889 the media noted that "it is becoming the exception rather than the rule to keep a Combination fixture". Fixtures had been left to individual clubs, which resulted in confusion, as it was unclear whether many matches between clubs were friendlies or Combination matches.

The Combination was finally wound up at a board meeting on 5 April 1889. The meeting was over in 25 minutes, the motion to dissolve the Combination being passed unanimously, after which those present enjoyed cold beef and pickles; the meeting was so quick that the Darwen representative, who had missed his train, arrived too late. However, a dozen of the representatives had another meeting afterwards, which formed the basis of the Football Alliance. There was no champion declared, as there was no satisfactory method of determining a table, given the lack of certainty as to which matches counted; it was generally however considered that Newton Heath had had the best record, winning 10 of their 14 matches.

Participating teams included Bootle, Blackburn Olympic, Burslem Port Vale, Crewe Alexandra, Grimsby Town, Lincoln City, Newton Heath, Small Heath and South Shore.

== Second incarnation ==
The second incarnation was founded in 1890. The twelve founder members were:

- Burton Swifts
- Chester
- Denton
- Derby St Luke's
- Gorton Villa
- Hyde
- Leek (not related to the current Leek Town)
- Macclesfield
- Northwich Victoria
- Stafford County (not related to the current Stafford Rangers)
- Witton (from Blackburn, not to be confused with Witton Albion from Northwich)
- Wrexham

Five of the founding teams would eventually go on to play in the Football League, although in the case of Macclesfield, this would not happen until 1997–98. Glossop North End, who joined in 1894, were also elected to the League (in 1898), as were another later member team, Tranmere Rovers.

As the competition evolved, the nature of the teams changed, with many more Welsh teams being involved, as well as the reserve teams of the Football League clubs such as Everton and Crewe Alexandra. By the time the competition folded in 1911 none of the original members still participated, with the exception of Wrexham, who fielded their reserve team. It was succeeded by the Cheshire County League and later by the North West Counties Football League.

=== Champions ===
The champions of the league were as follows:

Season	Champions	Runners-up	Third
1890–91	Gorton Villa F.C.	Macclesfield	Chester
1891–92	Everton Reserves	Northwich Victoria	Macclesfield
1892–93	Everton Reserves	Stoke Swifts	Chester
1893–94	Everton Reserves	Stoke Swifts	Leek
1894–95	Ashton North End	Glossop North End	Chester
1895–96	Everton Reserves	Macclesfield	Glossop North End
1896–97	Everton Reserves	Rock Ferry	Chester
1897–98	Everton Reserves	Crewe Alexandra	Chirk
1898–99	Everton Reserves	Liverpool Reserves	Tranmere Rovers
1899–1900	Chirk AAA	Wrexham	Druids
1900–01	Wrexham	Rhyl	Bangor
1901–02	Wrexham	Burslem Port Vale Reserves	Oswestry United
1902–03	Wrexham	Nantwich	Birkenhead
1903–04	Birkenhead	Chester	Nantwich
1904–05	Wrexham	Chester	Broughton United
1905–06	Whitchurch	Chester	Glossop Reserves
1906–07	Whitchurch	Chester	Wigan Town
1907–08	Tranmere Rovers	Chester	Oswestry United
1908–09	Chester	Saltney	Tranmere Rovers
1909–10	Crewe Alexandra Reserves	Saltney	Chester
1910–11	Whitchurch	Bangor	Oswestry United
