= Upton Rangers F.C. =

Uoton Rangers
- Full name: Upton Rangers Football Club
- Founded: 1876?
- Dissolved: 1893?
- Ground: West Ham Park

Upton Rangers F.C. was an English association football club from the Upton Park area of London.

== History ==
The earliest known match for the club is a 6–0 victory over the 1st Surrey Rifles F.C. in 1877.

The biggest win known for the club is an 8–0 home victory against the Downs club in February 1879. In 1882, the club became a founder member of the London Football Association, and entered the first London Senior Cup. In the first round the club lost 15–0 to the Old Brightonians at Dulwich, which was the club's heaviest known defeat.

Despite this record defeat, the club entered the FA Cup in 1883-84. The Rangers were drawn to play Old Wykehamists, with the choice of ground, so the club arranged the match at its home ground on the West Ham Park, which was "in as wretched a state of unevenness for play as could well be met with". Rangers were 3–0 down at half-time and 7–0 down by the end. The club did not enter the FA Cup again and by the end of the decade was playing junior football only.
