= Low Moor F.C. =

Low Moor
- Full name: Low Moor Football Club
- Nickname(s): the Moorites
- Founded: 1879
- Dissolved: 1887
- Ground: Dick Field
- Chairman: George Wilkinson
- Secretary: Ellis Dixon
Home colours

Low Moor F.C. was an English association football club, from Clitheroe, Lancashire. The club was sometimes called Clitheroe Low Moor or Low Moor (Clitheroe), but Low Moor was the club's self-reported name.

== History ==
The club was founded in 1879 and had reported matches as early as September 1880. The same year the original Clitheroe was founded in the same town, which instantly made it difficult for either club to become competitive on the national, or even local, stage; the club's first appearance in the Lancashire Senior Cup in 1881–82 saw the club's biggest competitive defeat - in the first round it beat Abbey Village of Withnell 5–1, in the second round it lost 13–1 Bolton Wanderers.

The club competed in the FA Cup three times during the 1880s. It first entered in 1883–84, but lost 6–0 in the first round to Blackburn Park Road, all of the goals coming in the first half.

The Moorites got a revenge of sorts the following year as the clubs were drawn together in the first round, at Park Road's ground; after a 3–3 draw, the Roadsters scratched, giving Low Moor a passage into the second round. Low Moor then went out to Southport, amidst some controversy as there were claims that two of the Southport goals were offside, and the Moorites denied two legitimate scores "to the amazement of spectators and players".

The club's final entry was in 1885–86. In the first time Low Moor 6–2 at Rossendale, the home side's opener after 20 minutes being an own goal after Kenyon miskicked.

It also entered the Lancashire Senior Cup until the 1885–86 season. Its biggest win was 8–0 at Willows Rovers of Kirkham in the first round in 1883–84, and its best run in 1884–85, reaching the fourth round (last 13). The run was ended by Bolton Wanderers once more, but a sign of the club's improvement from its earliest days was the margin was only three goals.

The club started the 1886–87 season with a positive balance sheet, and an influx of players re-joining from Clitheroe, but it resolved not to enter the FA Cup, and it did not enter the Senior Cup either. The club still had fixtures for the rest of the season, but it did not re-emerge for 1887–88.

== Colours ==
The club played in maroon shirts and white knickers.

== Ground ==
The club's ground was on Dick Field.
