= Old St James' F.C. =

Former football club from east London

Old St James's F.C.
- Full name: Old St James's Football Club
- Nickname: the Saints
- Founded: 1881
- Dissolved: 1891
- Ground: Beehive
- Secretary: Fred A. Donn

Old St James' Football Club, previously known as St James's Football Club, was an association football club from Forest Gate, East London.

== History ==
The club was formed in 1881, under the name St James' Football Club, and was the longest-lived of the early Forest Gate football sides, lasting until at least 1891. In 1889, due to the increase of teams with "St James" in their name, the club resolved to change its name to The Old St James' Football Club.

The club entered the FA Cup in 1885–86 but scratched after being drawn to play the Old Harrovians. Its other recorded competitive fixtures were in the much lower-key London Junior Cup, East End Junior Cup, and the Essex County Challenge Cup.

== Ground ==
The earliest known ground for the club was at Upton Lane. It did not arrange for a private ground until 1889, when it reached an agreement to use the Beehive in Ilford.
