= Southport F.C. (1881) =

Association football club active in the 1880s

- Full name: Southport Football Club
- Nicknames: the Stripes, the Seasiders
- Founded: 1881
- Dissolved: 1886
- Ground: Sports Ground
- Secretary: Thomas Burnett (1881–84), R. W. T. Hatch (1884–86)
1881–84 colours	1884–86 colours

Southport Football Club was an association football club from Southport, Lancashire, active in the 1880s.

== History ==
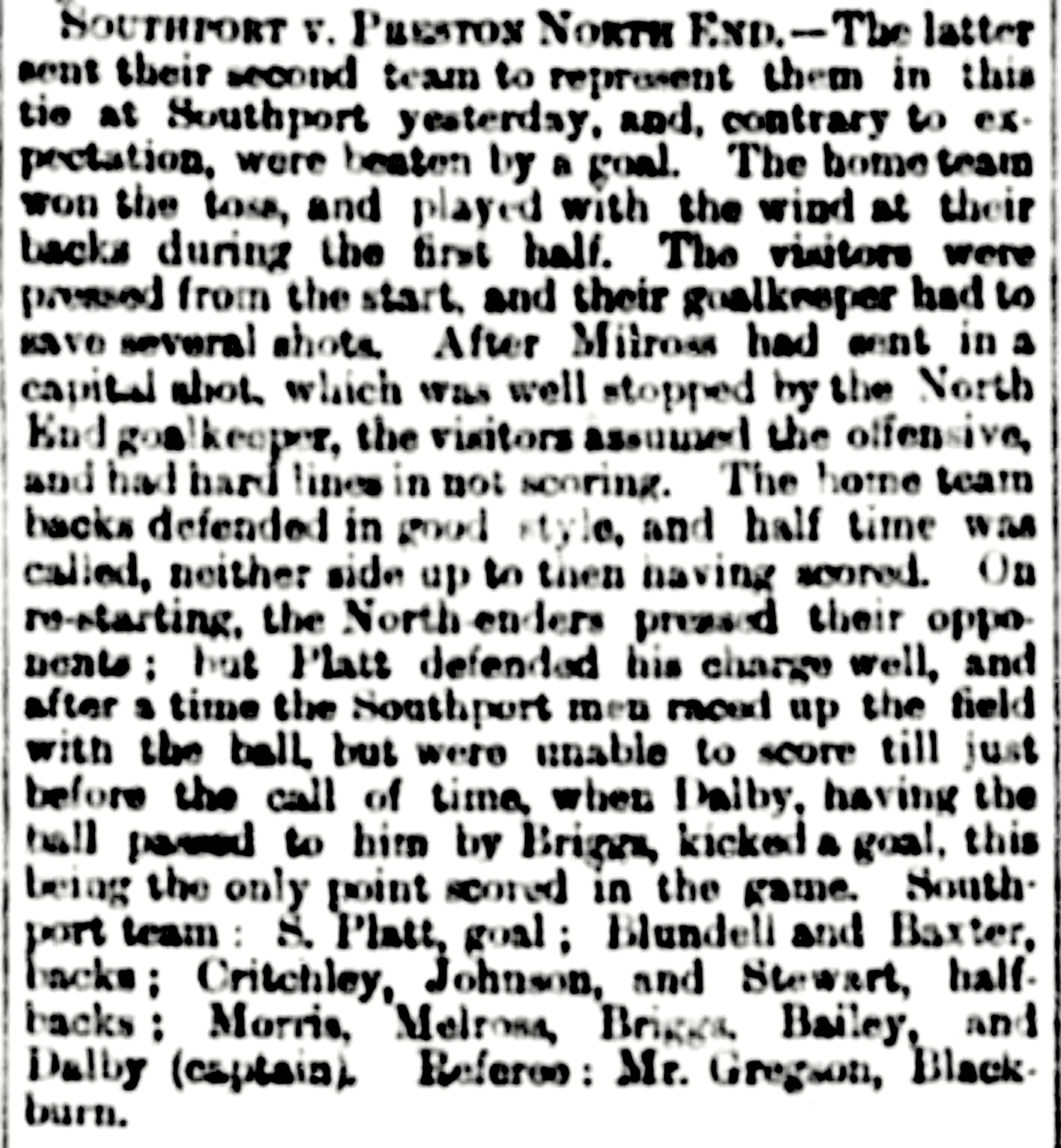
1884–85 Lancashire Senior Cup 2nd round, Southport 1–0 Preston North End, Liverpool Mercury, 3 November 1884

The Southport Football Club (the third club of that name) was founded in 1881, as a rugby union club. After three games, on the instigation of former Welsh international (and full-back for the rugby side) Thomas Blundell Burnett, the club switched codes to association football. Burnett became secretary and captain of the new club and he and rugby players such as W. Platt and Hatch, became stalwarts of the association side.

In 1882–83, the club entered the FA Cup, Lancashire Senior Cup, and Liverpool and District Challenge Cup, for the first time. The club only ever won one tie in the national competition, in 1884–85; Southport had lost at an under-strength Accrington in the first round, the home side taking matters so easy that goalkeeper Horne moved up front for part of the game, but Accrington was expelled because of its use of professional players, and Southport won its second round tie with Clitheroe Low Moor 3–1, albeit with the benefit of some generous refereeing, the Moorites apparently denied two legitimate scores "to the amazement of spectators and players". In the third round the club was slaughtered 10–0 at Church, going in at half-time eight goals behind.

Its best run in the Lancashire competition was to the third round in 1883–84 and 1884–85. In the former year, it lost only 2–0 to Blackburn Olympic, one of the strongest sides in the country at the time. There was however a sour aftermath; the clubs used the Shakespeare Hotel for changing facilities, and on their return after the match, found that several items, including cash and watches belonging to Southport players Robert Coventry and Paul Moorfield, had been stolen. In 1884–85, strengthened by a merger with the Southport Athletic Society, the club pulled off a major shock in the second round, beating Preston North End 1–0; it also came close to shocking Darwen in the third, going out by the odd goal in three, although admittedly both of the bigger clubs had to field under-strength XIs, as their "imported" professionals were not allowed to play in competition - indeed Darwen's first XI faced Accrington while the reserves were beating Southport.

The club finished the 1884–85 with a minor success, winning the Southport Charity Cup, thanks to a 5–0 win over the Crescent club from High Park. However, the increase in competition in the town - and the allowance of professional players in the competition (notably, Southport was not one of the many Lancastrian clubs forming the pro-professional British Football Association) - immediately transformed the club's prospects for the worse, and in the first round of the 1885–86 Lancashire Cup, Southport was summarily dispatched 12–1 at a first choice Darwen XI.

The financial impact of professionalism elsewhere was proving devastating, and the Athletic Club severed its connection with the football club, having suffered a loss of nearly £90. At the end of the 1885–86 season, one of the Southport committee members, Mr Gosson, was invited to attend the annual general meeting of the Southport Wanderers club, and the Wanderers invited Southport into a merger; the Wanderers was in the process of securing the old Southport ground at Scarisbrick New Road. After the clubs met in the Southport Charity Cup final in May at the Sports Ground, won 4–0 by Southport after the Wanderers were reduced to 10 men through injury, the Southport club broke up, many players (including captain Briggs) joining the Wanderers, and the Wanderers taking over the Southport name.

== Colours ==
The club originally wore red jerseys, changing to red and white striped flannel shirts in 1884. The Wanderers took over the Southport colours on taking over the club.

== Ground ==
The club's first ground was on Scarisbrick New Road, roughly where Westmoreland Road lies today. There was space enough for multiple pitches, one of which was used by Southport Olympic rugby club. It moved to the Sports Ground, on Sussex Road, in 1884, after the merger with the Athletic.
