= Lincoln Lindum F.C. =

Lincoln Lindum
- Full name: Lincoln Lindum Football Club
- Founded: 1861
- Dissolved: 1925
- Ground: Wragby Road
1863–72 colours	1876–79 colours

Lincoln Lindum F.C. was an English association football club from the city of Lincoln, England. It was one of the oldest football clubs in the world.

== History ==
The club was founded in 1861, before the foundation of the Football Association, as the Lincoln Football Club, and the club was an early member of the FA. The first match played by club members under Association laws was on 28 November 1863, a 10 per side game between the senior and junior members of the club. The club changed the law on starting the game - instead of a kick-off, the club decided to have the game started with the side winning the toss throwing the ball up at the centre of the ground, the other side keeping 10 yards distant.

The first "external" game played by the club was against Sheffield FC in February 1865 and was played under Sheffield rules. A return match at Wragby Road was played under Association laws in April 1865. The fixtures were repeated over the next few years, the home side generally winning.

In January 1867, the club played Hull F.C. to the latter's "special code of rules", which were more akin to rugby than football.

By 1868 the club was threatening to withdraw from the FA, on the basis that the association game was not rough enough. By 1872, the club changed its views and affirmed its commitment to the association code. The club however did not enter the FA Cup in the competition's early years.

In 1885–86, the club reached the final of the Lincolnshire Senior Cup, losing to Grimsby Town; however, Lincoln City had put in a protest about the semi-final with Grimsby, on the basis that the referee told the club there would be no extra time, and Grimsby had taken City walking off as forfeiting the tie. As a result of the protest, the FA ordered the Grimsby-City tie to be replayed, which Lincoln City won via forfeit after Grimsby refused to attend, but the Lincolnshire Football Association ignored the FA's ruling and ordered a replay of the final (which Grimsby won again). Ultimately an apology from the Lincolnshire FA to the Football Association was deemed to be the end of the matter. The following year Lincoln City beat Lindum 5–0 in the first round.

=== FA Cup ===
The club did not enter the FA Cup until 1885–86, by which time the club had changed its name to Lincoln Lindum; apparently as a reaction to the foundation of Lincoln City F.C. to emphasize the antiquity of the first Lincoln club. The club beat Grimsby & District 4–0 in the first round in front of a record crowd, three goals coming from scrimmages; it lost to Redcar in the second in front of a small crowd. The club entered for the next two years, but did not win another tie.

=== Decline ===
The club resolutely remained amateur, while neighbours City turned professional and joined the Football League, as did nearby Gainsborough Trinity. This meant that the club could not remain competitive in national senior competitions; indeed one of the founder members of Lincoln City was the Lincoln captain Richard Mason.

As a result, the club played on the local stage, and, although active until World War 1, had very few matches afterwards; although the club advertised looking for local matches, the only mention of any match from the 1920s is a friendly at Wragby in September 1925.

=== Revival ===
The name has been revived on occasion, the first time in 1932.

== Colours ==
The club's colours changed over the years from white and red, via blue and white, to Lincoln green and cardinal:

Colours
Years	Jersey colour	Knickerbockers	Stockings	Cap	Trim
1864–72	White with Lincoln arms on left breast	White	Red	Red	Red belt
1873–76	Blue & white broad stripes	White	Blue & white stripes	Blue & white stripes	
1876–79	Lincoln green	probably white		n/a	
1884–86	Lincoln green & cardinal	probably white		n/a	
