= Kelly Houlker =

English footballer

Personal information
- Full name: Albert Edward Houlker
- Date of birth: 27 April 1872
- Place of birth: Blackburn, England
- Date of death: 27 May 1962 (aged 90)
- Place of death: Blackburn, England
- Height: 5 ft 6 in (1.68 m)
- Position: Left half

Senior career*
Years	Team	Apps	(Gls)
- Blackburn Hornets
- Oswaldtwistle Rovers
- Cob Wall
- Park Road
1894–1902	Blackburn Rovers	121	(2)
1902–1903	Portsmouth	23	(1)
1903–1906	Southampton	59	(3)
1906–1907	Blackburn Rovers	31	(0)
1909	Colne		

International career
1902–1906	England	5	(0)
- * Club domestic league appearances and goals

Albert Edward "Kelly" Houlker (27 April 1872 – 27 May 1962) was an English footballer who played at left-half for Blackburn Rovers and England.

== Playing career ==
Houlker was born in Blackburn and started his playing career at Blackburn Hornets, progressing through a variety of local sides in his home-town (including Oswaldtwistle Rovers, Cob Wall and Park Road) before joining Blackburn Rovers in August 1894. He remained at Blackburn Rovers for eight seasons. His time at Blackburn Rovers was during a long lean period for the club. During the 1896–97 season they stayed in the First Division only as the result of a decision to increase the number of teams. The final years of the 19th century brought little success for Blackburn Rovers and several narrow escapes from relegation.

Houlker won his first England cap against Scotland two days before he left Rovers to join Southern League champions Portsmouth in May 1902. His second cap came against Wales on 2 March 1903 in the only international played at Fratton Park, Portsmouth followed by another cap against Scotland a month later.

Houlker then moved along the south coast to join newly crowned Southern League champions Southampton in May 1903. He remained at The Dell for three seasons, helping the Saints to retain the championship in 1903–04, playing alongside Bert Lee and Tommy Bowman.

Tenacious and strong, rather than clever, Houlker became very popular with the Southampton public and during his time at The Dell he also won two more England caps against Ireland and Wales in 1906.

In 1906 he intended to retire from professional football but was persuaded to rejoin Blackburn Rovers where he turned out regularly until finally retiring in 1907. Retirement didn't last long and he joined Colne in 1909.

During World War I he played for Blackburn Rovers in a wartime match when he was 45.

He was then working as an overseer at a mill, before running a coal and haulage business in Blackburn before retiring in 1947. He died in 1962, a month after his 90th birthday.

== Honours ==
Southampton

- Southern League championship: 1903–04
