= Oswaldtwistle Rovers F.C. =

Defunct association football club in England

Oswaldtwistle Rovers
- Full name: Oswaldtwistle Rovers Football Club
- Nicknames: Rovers, Ossy, The Whistlers
- Founded: 1879
- Dissolved: 1910
- Ground: Rhoden Ground
Home colours

Oswaldtwistle Rovers Football Club was a team based in Oswaldtwistle, Lancashire. They first entered the FA Cup in 1884 and reached the second round in 1885. Rovers were one of the founding members of the Lancashire League in 1889 but predominantly competed in the Lancashire Combination between 1894 and 1909. In 1909, after leaving the second division of the Combination, they played their final game in the FA Cup.

== History ==
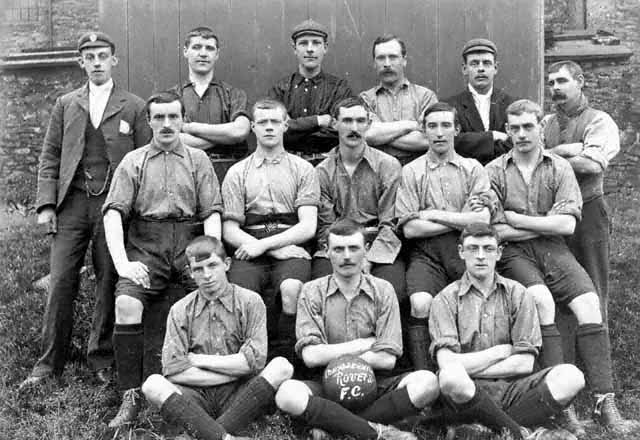
The team in the 1890s

Oswaldtwistle Rovers were based in Oswaldtwistle, near Accrington, in Lancashire. In addition to friendly matches, they played in several competitions, including the FA Cup, the Lancashire League and the Lancashire Combination.

The first of their 22 appearances in the FA Cup came in the 1884–85 season, where they lost 12–0 to local side Blackburn Olympic in the first round. However, the Olympics were a strong team that had won the cup in 1882–83 – the first time won by a northern team. They fared better in 1885–86, beating Lower Darwen 3–1 in the first round. In the next round, they were paired against another local side, cup-holders Blackburn Rovers. They lost the game 1–0, with the goal scored by Hugh McIntyre; only a thousand spectators attended the game, which suggests that the two Rovers were not big rivals despite their proximity. Blackburn Rovers went on to retain the cup that year.

Oswaldtwistle never again made it to the second round of the FA Cup. In the 1888–89 season, qualifying rounds were introduced. That year, Rovers entered the second qualifying round, winning 3–1 at Blackburn Olympic, before losing to South Shore, who later merged Blackpool F.C. In the same season, Rovers won the Lancashire Junior Cup for the only time, beating holders Blackpool 2–1 in a replay at Deepdale, in front of a crowd estimated at between 8,000 and 10,000; the result was considered something of a shock, with a "listless" Blackpool side reportedly indulging in a contretemps in their dressing tent post-match, and the club committee "got it hot" for an unorthodox selection for the replay. In February 1888, the Whistlers also hosted Newton Heath – who would later change their name to Manchester United – in a friendly match that they won 6–0.

In 1889, Oswaldtwistle was one of the founding members of the Lancashire League. However, they struggled in that league and left at the end of the 1890–91 season, finishing bottom of the table with only one win from 20 matches. In 1894, they entered the Lancashire Combination, a league generally populated by small local sides and the reserve teams of the larger Lancashire clubs. They ended the campaign in fourth place in the division, their highest-ever league position. The team left the Combination in 1897 but returned three years later. They were then relegated to the Second Division of the Combination in 1904. Oswaldtwistle's final full league campaign, in 1908–09, saw the club concede 137 goals.

The club was forced to play in the extra preliminary round in the 1909–10 FA Cup; paired against Dobson & Barlow's in the extra preliminary round, they drew 1–1 at home before losing 2–0 away in the replay. Its final league season ended prematurely; it resigned from the Lancashire Combination in March 1910, and Walkden Central took over its fixtures. The club needed gates of £15 to break even but had only been receiving £11 and had debts of £108, meaning that the club could not afford the expenses for the remaining away matches. The Rovers had at least signed off with a win, a late Taylor penalty securing a 2–1 win over Eccles Borough.

The club's annual general meeting in April 1910 heard that the ground owner wanted to use it for housing, and had refused the club a lease for the 1910–11 season. The club was caught between wanting to join a league, for which it required a ground, and leasing a ground without the certainty of a league, and ultimately, the committee resolved to wind up the club. The club was duly liquidated, and its paraphernalia sold at auction on 30 July 1910.

== Colours ==
The Alcock yearbooks for 1886 to 1889 give the club's colours as red jerseys and white knickers; by 1902 its jerseys were described as scarlet.

== Ground ==
The club initially played at the White Ash ground. By 1886 it was playing at the Town Bent and by 1887, it was at the Rhoden Ground on Roe Greave Road, near the Rose & Crown.

== Seasons ==
Results by season
Season	League									FA Cup	References
Season	Division	P	W	D	L	F	A	Pts	Pos	FA Cup	References
1884–85	—									1R	
1885–86	—									2R	
1886–87	—									1R	
1887–88	—									1R	
1888–89	—									3Q	
1889–90	LL	24	8	4	12	39	62	20	11th	—	
1890–91	LL	20	1	5	14	25	59	7	11th	—	
1891–92	—									—	
1892–93	—									2Q	
1893–94	—									1Q	
1894–95	LC	24	13	1	10	59	56	27	4th	1Q	
1895–96	LC	26	12	5	9	53	42	29	5th	3Q	
1896–97	LC	28	3	2	23	27	105	8	15th	1Q	
1897–98	—									PR	
1898–99	—									1Q	
1899–1900	—									2Q	
1900–01	LC	34	7	4	23	39	93	18	17th	2Q	
1901–02	LC	34	12	6	16	55	62	30	12th	2Q	
1902–03	LC	34	11	5	18	53	84	27	13th	4Q	
1903–04	LC	34	7	9	18	50	84	23	14th	PR	
1904–05	LC2	34	17	6	11	81	56	40	7th	1Q	
1905–06	LCB	36	10	4	22	56	77	24	16th	3Q	
1906–07	LCB	38	12	6	20	72	114	30	18th	2Q	
1907–08	LCB	38	11	5	22	58	100	27	17th	—	
1908–09	LCB	38	7	3	28	42	137	17	19th	PR	
1909–10	–									EPR	

Key: LL – Lancashire League; LC – Lancashire Combination; LCB – Lancashire Combination, B division; nR – nth round; nQ – nth round qualifying; PR – preliminary round; EPR – extra preliminary round.

== Former players ==
Former players who also played professionally in the English Football League include Tommy Becton, Martin Dunne, Proctor Hall, Kelly Houlker, Dick Lindley and George Parsonage.
