= Grimsby & District F.C. =

Grimsby & District
- Full name: Grimsby & District Football Club
- Founded: 1882
- Dissolved: 1887?
- Ground: Cleethorpes Road
Home colours

Grimsby & District F.C. was an English association football club from the town of Grimsby in Lincolnshire.

== History ==
The club was founded in 1882 and played at Mr Good's field on the Cleethorpes Road, at a time when the already existing Grimsby Town was playing at Clee Park. At the start of the 1883–84 season, the club took over the White Star club of Grimsby, which had been founded in 1878 and claimed to be the equal of Grimsby Town. The newly merged club proved stronger with the addition of the leading White Star players, including J. Ellis and R. Fanthorpe, both of whom would be captains of the side, and the first match was against Hull side Blue Star in October 1883.

Soon afterwards, the club obtained its biggest win with a 13–0 victory over Louth Trinity Recreation in November 1883, with Raynes scoring 8. At the end of the season the club won its only trophy, the Hospital Cup, which the club returned to the Lincolnshire FA to be an annual prize between junior teams.

The club seems to have disbanded after the 1886–87 season, the last available reference to the club being its appearance in the first round of the Lincolnshire Senior Cup that season. As Grimsby Town were a professional club with enough stature to join the Football Combination for 1888–89, there was no scope for a second professional club in the town.

=== FA Cup ===
The club entered the FA Cup twice. In 1884-85 the club withdrew rather than having to travel to face Middlesbrough F.C., with Grimsby & District "being satisfied that they had no chance with the Tees-siders".

The next year the club lost 4–0 at Lincoln Lindum in the first round, before the largest crowd of the season at Lindum's home.

== Colours ==
The club's colours were blue with a white silk sash.

== Notable players ==
Billy Hopewell, future Derby County and Grimsby Town player
