= Old Wykehamists F.C. =

Association football club in England

Old Wykehamists
- Full name: Old Wykehamists Association Football Club
- Nickname: the Dark Blues
- Founded: 1876
- Ground: Bull's Drove
- League: Arthurian League First Division
Home colours

The Old Wykehamist Association Football Club is an English association football club whose players are alumni of Winchester College, in Winchester, Hampshire.

Having been a member of The Football Association and entered the FA Cup in the Victorian era, Old Wykehamists currently play in the First Division of the Arthurian League, the second-highest tier of the competition.

== History ==
The club was founded in 1876, playing its first game at Westminster School in October, and entered the FA Cup twice in the 1870s, in 1876–77 and 1877–78, withdrawing on both occasions. Nevertheless, the side was strong enough to provide five players for the England national side.

The club entered the Cup again in 1883–84 and enjoyed its best-ever Cup run; beating Upton Rangers 7–0 at West Ham Park in the first round, and Windsor 1–0 at the latter's Home Park ground, before getting a bye in the third round. However, in the fourth round (last 16) the club was paired with Cup holders Blackburn Olympic, a fully professional club. The tie was played at Olympic's Hole-i'-th'-Wall ground in front of 3,000 spectators and, even though Olympic had to play the second half with ten men because of injury, they were already 5–0 up at half-time; the Dark Blues only conceded one more in the second half.

The following season the club reached the fourth round again, this time consisting of 18 clubs, beating both Maidenhead and Hotspur away from home, and Upton Park at the neutral Kennington Oval in the third round, before losing 7–0 to Queen's Park at the second Hampden Park, with six goals coming in the first half, before a crowd of 5,000.

In 1885–86, the Dark Blues beat Uxbridge 5–0 in the first round at Home Park in Windsor, and were drawn to play Luton Wanderers in the second; the Luton Times & Bedford Advertiser, when reporting on the Wanderers' first round win, stated that the Luton side "showed some very good form, and if they play as well on November 21 [in the second round] as they did on Saturday it will be a hard job for the Old Wykehamists to beat them, if they do so at all." The game was held at the Kennington Oval and Old Wykehamists recorded their biggest-ever FA Cup win by scoring 10 goals without reply.

In the third round, the club was due to face Great Marlow at the Dolphin Ground, the home of the Swifts, on Saturday 12 December, but the previous day the Wykehamists' secretary T.B. Hughes inspected the pitch and declared it unplayable because of frost; he wrote to Marlow stating that the Wykehamists would not turn up, and Marlow therefore did not attend. On the following Monday, the Football Association, instead of asking the clubs to reschedule the match, disqualified both of them, on the basis that "the rule on the subject is clear, and that it has over and over again been pointed out to clubs that they run a great risk in leaving the settlement of cup matches until the last available day." Two other teams (Old Harrovians and Clapham Rovers) were also disqualified for not playing on pitches which had been badly affected by the deep frost.

The club continued to enter the FA Cup, and from 1888 to 1889 had to play in the newly instituted qualifying rounds. The club's last Cup tie was a 4–0 defeat to Ipswich Town in the second qualifying round in 1892–93.

In modern times, Old Wykehamists — now called the Old Wykehamist Football Club — are members of the Arthurian League (affiliated to the Amateur Football Alliance) and field two teams there.

== Colours ==
The club's colours for their first two FA Cup entries were red and white. By 1882 the club had changed to dark blue and white and in recent years the club alternates between blue shirts and white shorts, and white shirts and blue shorts.

== International players ==
The following played for England whilst with the club (with the number of caps received whilst registered with Old Wykehamists F.C.):

- Claude Ashton (1 cap)
- John Bain (1 cap)
- F. T. Green (1 cap)
- Leonard Howell (1 cap)
- William Lindsay (1 cap)

Bain and Lindsay made their only appearances together, on 3 March 1877 against Scotland.

== Honours ==
- Arthur Dunn Cup
  - Winners (8): 1920, 1929, 1930, 1931, 1938, 1940, 1950, 1961
