= Redcar and Coatham F.C. =

Former association football club in England

Redcar and Coatham
- Full name: Redcar and Coatham Football Club
- Nicknames: The Seasiders; The Redcarites
- Founded: 1878; 148 years ago
- Dissolved: 1895; 131 years ago
- Ground: Redcar Cricket Club, Coatham
Home colours

Redcar and Coatham Football Club was a football club based in Redcar, England.

== History ==
The club was formed in 1878 under the name Redcar & Coatham Y.M.C.A., out of the Redcar & Coatham Cricket Club, the name becoming the simpler Redcar & Coatham by the 1880–81 season. The club was also sometimes simply referred to as Redcar.

The club quickly built up a rivalry with Middlesbrough F.C., the matches between the sides described as "great interest", The clubs met each other in the final of the Cleveland Challenge Cup for the first five iterations of the competition, with Middlesbrough winning every time.

On the national stage, however, Redcar & Coatham had the best run in the FA Cup for a team from the north-east in the pre-Football League era. The club first entered the competition in 1883–84, but was forced to scratch from its first round tie with Nottingham Forest because it could not get a team together. The following season the club won its first match in the Cup, against Sunderland A.F.C., and lost to Grimsby Town in the second round.

The club's best run came in 1885–86. After beating Sunderland again and Lincoln Lindum F.C., and receiving a bye, the club finally got a measure of revenge over Middlesbrough by winning 2–1 in a snowstorm at the Cricket Ground. Boro was the odds-on favourite but suffered injuries during the match, and Simpson won the game for the home side with a shot that Boro back Miller deflected away from his goalkeeper; Redcar claimed a third goal at the death but the referee said he had already called for time.

The win put Redcar into the quarter-finals, but the club was unlucky with the draw, being forced to travel to Birmingham to meet Small Heath Alliance on a Coventry Road pitch so notable for its furrows and divots that richer sides had previously paid the Heathens to switch venues, although the local media were optimistic that Redcar had drawn "the weakest club of the lot to tackle". The nearly 7,000 crowd was "certainly the largest that has been seen on a Birmingham football field this season" and the Heathens won through 2–0.

With professionalism now allowed in football, the larger towns of Sunderland and Newcastle, as well as Middlesbrough, now started to take the game more seriously, and Redcar was unable to retain its best players. The club only won one more FA Cup tie before qualifying rounds were introduced and it retreated to the "non-league" game, playing junior football. Although the cricket side continues, the football side gave up the ghost in the 1894–95 season, winding up before it was due to play Darlington F.C. in the Cleveland Cup on 12 January 1895, owing to the "want of funds".

== Colours ==
The first reported colours for the club are "black and red stripes" in 1880. Red and black remained the club's colours until at least 1886, and by 1889 the club had changed to red and white stripes.

== Ground ==
The club originally played at the Redcar Racecourse. By 1881 the club had decided to use the cricket ground for football in winter as well as cricket in summer.

== Notable former players ==
- James Howcroft, vice-president of the Football Association and FA Cup final linesman
- William Harrison, former Sheffield Wednesday and Blackburn Olympic forward
- Tom Alvey, former Middlesbrough full-back
- Charles Alfred Pauls, Football League winner with Preston North End, Northern League winner with Middlesbrough Ironopolis
- Edward Uvo Pauls, former Middlesbrough player
- Arthur Charles Tofts, former Darlington player and co-founder

== Records ==
- FA Cup
  - Quarter Finals: 1885–86
- Cleveland Challenge Cup
  - Runners-up: 1881–82, 1882–83, 1883–84, 1884–85, 1885–86, 1888–89
- Cleveland Junior Cup
  - Winners: 1887–88, 1889–90

== Bibliography ==
- Neal, Tom (2021). The Famous Yorkshiremen: The Forgotten History of Redcar's Footballing Pioneers. London: Old Bird Publishing. ISBN 978-1-3999-0699-9.
