= Tommy Becton =

English footballer

Personal information
- Full name: Thomas Becton
- Date of birth: 1878
- Place of birth: Preston, England
- Date of death: 11 August 1957 (aged 78–79)
- Place of death: Fulwood, England
- Positions: Inside left; outside left

Senior career*
Years	Team	Apps	(Gls)
1897–1898	Preston North End	4	(0)
1898–1899	New Brighton Tower	24	(7)
1899–1900	Sunderland	14	(7)
1900–1901	Kettering Town		
1901–1902	Bristol Rovers	25	(3)
1902–?	Kettering Town		
- Oswaldtwistle Rovers
- Colne
1906-1908	Rossendale United	87	(6)
- * Club domestic league appearances and goals

Thomas Becton (1878–11 August 1957) was a professional footballer, who played in The Football League for Preston North End, New Brighton Tower and Sunderland, as well as playing professionally for a number of teams outside the Football League.

Becton was a forward, who played in the inside left and outside left positions, starting out with his home town club, Preston North End. He moved to the now-defunct New Brighton Tower in 1898, and to Sunderland a year later. Following this he played for a series of non-Football League clubs, starting with Kettering Town in 1900. He moved to Southern League side Bristol Rovers in 1901, before returning to Kettering after a year.

He went on to play for Oswaldtwistle Rovers and Colne, and ended his career playing with Rossendale United.
