= William Harrison (footballer, born 1858) =

English footballer

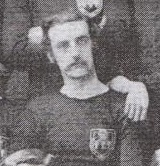
- Harrison in 1882

Personal information
- Full name: William Harrison
- Date of birth: 1858
- Place of birth: Lancaster, England
- Date of death: 17 April 1890
- Place of death: Smithfield, Orange Free State, South Africa
- Position: Forward

Senior career*
Years	Team	Apps	(Gls)
1878-1885	Redcar		
1880	Middlesbrough		
1883	The Wednesday		
1884	Blackburn Olympic		
- * Club domestic league appearances and goals

William Harrison (1858–17 April 1890) was an English footballer who played as a forward for Redcar, Middlesbrough, The Wednesday and Blackburn Olympic.

== Life and career ==
Harrison was born in 1858 in Lancaster. He worked as an elementary school inspector and moved to Redcar in the 1870s to find work alongside his brother Thomas.

He helped to establish the town's first football club, Redcar and Coatham where he became captain.

By 1882, Harrison was regarded as one of the best forwards in the North of England, with Charles Alcock's Football Annual listing him as one of the "chief English players of 1881-82." Thanks to his growing reputation, the same year Harrison was selected to represent the North in the annual North vs South football match at Kennington Oval, used as a trial match to select the England squad.
