= Bradshaw F.C. =

Bradshaw
- Full name: Bradshaw Football Club
- Founded: 1878
- Dissolved: 1888
- Ground: The Rigby
- Secretary: E. and T. Smethurst
Home colours

Bradshaw F.C. was an English association football club from the village of Bradshaw Brow, near Bolton in Lancashire.

== History ==
The club was founded in 1878. It was an early member of the Lancashire Football Association, entering the Lancashire Senior Cup for the first time in 1880–81, the second year of the competition's existence, but lost 9–0 to Blackburn Rovers in the first round.

The club entered the FA Cup for the first time in 1883–84, losing in the first round to the newly founded Bolton Association. The following year the club was unlucky to draw Darwen for their first tie; the Darreners were not the force they had been half-a-decade earlier, but they were still professional, and Bradshaw went down 11–0. Darwen was so dominant that goalkeeper Richmond went up front during the second half and scored two goals. By coincidence the clubs also met in the second round of the Lancashire Senior Cup, this time in Bradshaw Brow, and the score again ended 11–0 to Darwen. Bradshaw had beaten a Burnley side shorn of its best "imported" players, who were ineligible for the competition, 2–1 in the first round, thanks to a winner from Haslam in the 87th minute.

Bradshaw's only other win in the Senior Cup had been a 10–1 win at the Bolton side Back-o'th'-Bank in 1882–83, played at Astley Bridge's ground as Back-o'th'-Bank was temporarily homeless; Back-o'th'-Bank scored the first goal, but Bradshaw was 4–1 up by the break. In the second round Bradshaw went down 9–2 at home to a mostly reserve Bolton Wanderers, only Tom Naylor and Howarth of the first XI bolstering the Wanderers.

Bradshaw did not enter the Senior Cup after 1884–85, and finished the season with only 6 wins in 18 matches, its major successes coming in the Bolton Charity Medal Competition, in which it reached the semi-final. It had one last tilt in competitive senior football by entering the 1885–86 FA Cup, its last entry in the national competition. In the first round, the club was drawn against Hurst. Bradshaw lost 2–1, but protested that the Hurst player Nussey was registered with Astley Bridge, and a regional committee in Liverpool ordered a replay. That replay ended 1–1, and, as Hurst refused to play extra-time, referee Downs awarded the tie to Bradshaw. Unfortunately for the village side, Hurst protested this decision, and the Football Association ordered another replay, this time at a neutral venue. At the third time of asking, in Darwen, Hurst finally beat Bradshaw 3–2, with Bradshaw nearly coming back from 3–0 down at half-time. Both sides played the first half with ten men after a Hurst player missed his train and a Bradshaw player did not turn up; in the second half both sides were up to eleven, Bradshaw pressing a reserve player into service.

As a village club with no wider catchment area, it was unable to compete in the professional era, although it was one of the clubs involved in the attempt to set up a professional football body, the British Football Association, in 1884. Outside the senior game, the club remained active certainly until 1886–87, and, although functionally defunct, the Smethurst brothers ensured the club remained at least notionally in existence until 1888.

== Colours ==
The club's colours were white and blue.

== Ground ==
The club played at the Rigby, which was then - and remains, as at 2026 - the ground of the Bradshaw Cricket Club.
