= Luton Wanderers F.C. =

Luton Wanderers
- Full name: Luton Wanderers Football Club
- Nickname(s): the Wanderers
- Founded: 1880
- Dissolved: 1887
- Ground: Dallow Lane
Home colours

Luton Wanderers Football Club was one of the first English football clubs from the town of Luton in Bedfordshire and the first from the town to enter the FA Cup.

== History ==
The club was formed in September 1880, at a meeting at the Cricketer's Arms in High Town Road. The joining fee was 1 shilling, and the subscription two old pennies per week.

The first reported game for the club was against Luton Excelsior in December 1881, played to Association laws but with 15 men per side.

The first Cup tie the club played, in 1884–85, was against the Old Etonians, and proved such an attraction that a crowd of nearly 2,000 attended.

In January 1885, club secretary and captain Herbert Spratley arranged for the club to change its name to Luton Town, in order to represent the whole of Luton rather than just the members. This proved so unpopular a move that in April a public meeting was held to form a genuine professional "town" club, which was also called Luton Town. Spratley attended the meeting, to no avail, and was offered a place on the new club's committee as recompense.

Notwithstanding the formation of the new club, the Wanderers continued for two more years. The club's only win in the FA Cup came in the 1885–86 season, beating Chesham 3–2, with the Wanderers sportingly conceding an appeal of a goal from Chesham as neither umpire was in a position to see whether a shot had crossed the line. However the influence of the new club was demonstrated when the club - without Spratley - lost 10–0 at the Old Wykehamists; worse was to come in 1886–87, with most of the club's players playing for Luton Town instead, the remnants of the Wanderers - featuring only three of the players from Chesham victory - went down 13–0 at Swifts of Slough, eight goals coming in the first half.

The club's final game was an ill-tempered match against Dunstable F.C. in February 1887, with the result that no club wanted to arrange fixtures with the Wanderers; as Luton Town had already taken over the mantle of being the town's top club, and so many players had joined Town that the Wanderers had to withdraw from matches against Millwall and Hemel Hempstead, the Wanderers were allowed to fade away.

== Colours ==
The club wore red and black.

== Ground ==
Originally the club played on the People's Park, but, when entering the FA Cup, the club moved to an enclosed ground on Dallow Lane, with the Cricketer's Arms providing changing facilities.
