= Derby St Luke's F.C. =

Derby St Luke's
- Full name: Derby St Luke's Football Club
- Nickname: The Churchmen
- Founded: 1870
- Dissolved: 1892
- Ground: Peet Street, Derby, 1890: Vulcan Ground, Derby
Home colours

Derby St Luke's Football Club was an English amateur association football club based in Derby that existed from the 1870s to the 1890s. It competed in the FA Cup between 1884 and 1888.

== History ==
Founded in 1870 and nicknamed the Churchmen, the club's origins lay in connection with the recently built St Luke's Church on Parliament Street. St Luke's was one of the founder members of the Derbyshire Football Association in 1883. By the 1880s, they were entering the Derbyshire, Sheffield & Hallamshire and Birmingham Senior Cup competitions. In the 1884–85 Birmingham Cup, they recorded a 13–1 away victory over Sawley Rangers. In November of that season, they lost 3–1 to the recently formed Derby County in a Derbyshire Cup tie at the County Ground; 3,000 people watched what was both the latter's first competitive match and their first home win.

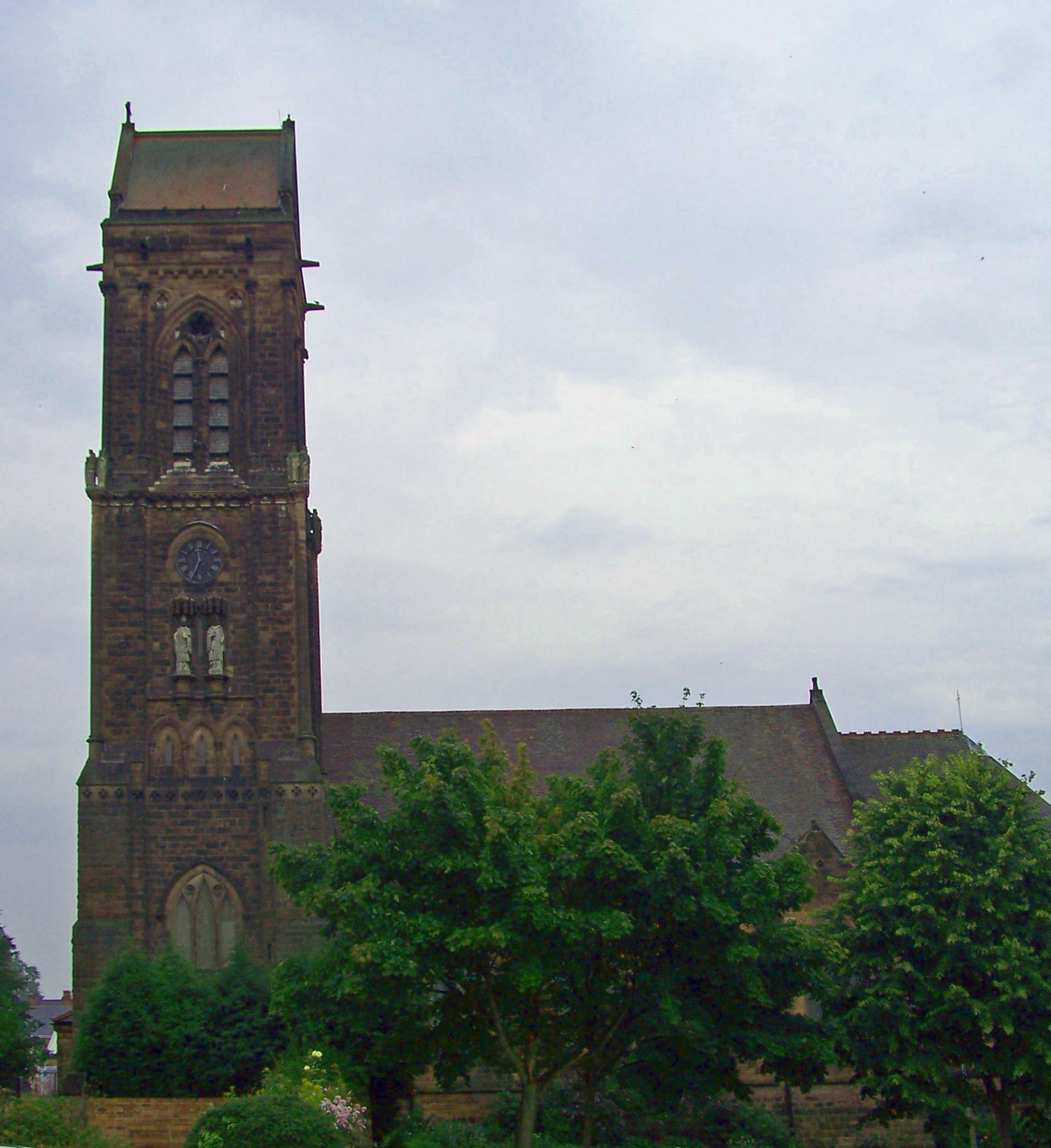
The club took its name from St Luke's Church

St Luke's entered the FA Cup for the first time in 1884–85, and were drawn against Wolverhampton Wanderers in the first round. After drawing 1–1 at Wolves' Dudley Road ground in front of a crowd of 3,100, St Luke's won the replay in Derby 4–2. In the second round, they lost 1–0 against Walsall Swifts. They played in the FA Cup for the next three seasons but lost in the first round on each occasion. In 1885–86, Wolves gained revenge with a 7–0 win. In 1886-87 they faced Walsall Town, drawing 3–3 at home but losing 6–1 in the replay at The Chuckery. In its final appearance in 1887–88, St Luke's lost 3–2 to local rivals Derby Junction, who went on to reach the semi-finals of the competition. Qualifying rounds were introduced the following season, and St Luke's were subsequently unsuccessful in reaching the competition proper, reaching the 2nd qualifying round twice and the 3rd qualifying round on one occasion.

Along with other local amateur clubs, St Luke's struggled to compete for players and support following the emergence of Derby County, and particularly once the latter became a founder member of the Football League in 1888. St Luke's joined the Combination as a founder member for the 1890–91 season, but failed to complete its fixtures and its record was expunged. The Churchmen scratched their Derbyshire Cup tie and the following season, 1891–92, scratched before the draw of the first round. On St. Luke's demise, (Derby) St. Luke's Sunday School took the decision to shorten their name from 1892 to 1893.

Goalkeeper WE Parsons appears to have played the most competitive games for the club having played 33 games (11 FA Cup, 16 Derbyshire County FA Senior Cup, 6 Birmingham and District FA Cup). G Halksworth appears to have scored the most competitive goals for the club, scoring 11 goals (3 FA Cup, 8 Derbyshire County FA Senior Cup).

== Colours ==
The club's colours were originally Oxford and Cambridge blue, before changing to blue and white by 1890.

== Grounds ==
The club's regular home ground on Peet Street was situated just north of the church; it also staged some important games at the County Cricket Ground. It moved to the Vulcan Ground in 1890. A cul-de-sac called Olive Street was built across the site of their former ground.

== Sources ==
- Bradbury, Mike (2013). Lost Teams of the Midlands. Xlibris. ISBN 9781483695297.
- Seddon, Peter (2013). The Men Who Made the Rams: Origins and Who's Who of Derby County Football Club 1884 to 1888. Toton: Tony Brown. ISBN 9781905891771.
