= Clitheroe F.C. (1879) =

English association football club

Clitheroe
- Full name: Clitheroe Football Club
- Founded: 1879
- Dissolved: 1886
- Ground: Church Meadow
Home colours

Clitheroe F.C. was an English association football club, from Lancashire, England.

== History ==
A Clitheroe F.C. was formed in 1877, but appears to have played only one match, a defeat to Blackburn Rovers on Ribble Hill Common.

The instant club was founded in 1879; founder members included Nathan Aldersley, who co-founded the Ribblesdale Cricket League. The same year Low Moor F.C. was founded in the same town, which instantly made it difficult for either club to become competitive on the national, or even local, stage. The club's first entry to the Lancashire Senior Cup, in 1880–81, saw it lose 10–1 at Blackburn Rovers in the first round; its second, in 1881–82, saw it lose 7–0 at Livesey Grasshoppers in the second, "to the surprise of all interested in the match".

The club competed in the FA Cup main draw four times in the 1880s, not once going past the first round. The only time the club even forced a replay was in 1883–84, drawing 3–3 against South Shore at home, after the Clitheroe umpire mistakenly made a claim for offside against the wrong South Shore player, ensuring the resulting goal was awarded. The replay was a "very rough and unpleasant" game and, despite registering 12 corners to 4, Clitheroe went out 3–2, the second South Shore goal being disputed. It had a little more success in the Lancashire Senior Cup, its best run being to the third round in 1884–85, losing at home to Astley Bridge at that stage; Clitheroe was without three first choice players for the tie, two through injury and one through ineligibility.

Clitheroe was one of the many Lancastrian clubs which were paying players, in breach of the Football Association rules, and withdrew from the Cup in 1884–85 because of an effective embargo on the club's fixtures. The club was one of those which formed the British Football Association, and when the FA legalized professionalism, Clitheroe could play in the 1885–86 FA Cup competition without fear; however the first round draw put them at home to holders (and eventual winners) Blackburn Rovers and the club lost 2–0, in what was perhaps the club's best objective result.

The final reported match for the club was a home draw with Low Moor in March 1886. At the end of the season, amidst general apathy, the club committee attempted to resign, only for there to be no new committee to take its place; the club did not re-emerge for the 1886–87 season. A new club of the same name was founded in October 1887.

== Colours ==
The club listed its colour as blue.

== Ground ==
The club played at Church Meadow, behind the Waterloo Spinning Mill, using the Commercial Inn for facilities.
