= Blackburn Law F.C. =

Blackburn Law
- Full name: Blackburn Law Football Club
- Nickname(s): Law
- Founded: 1876
- Dissolved: 1883
- Ground: Lane Ends
- President: Mr T. Ainsworth
- Chairman: H. T. Platts
- Hon. Secretary: Arthur Constantine

Blackburn Law, originally the Law Football and Cricket Club, was an English association football club based in Blackburn, Lancashire.

== History ==
The club was founded in 1876 and membership was restricted to solicitors, who had contributed 50 guineas through subscriptions by the time the club was entering its second year.

The club optimistically entered the FA Cup in 1881–82 as one of four sides from the town (the others being Blackburn Rovers, Blackburn Olympic, and Blackburn Park Road) to do so, despite not having entered the Lancashire Senior Cup in the competition's two years of existence. The club was drawn to play Bootle in the first round, and took the lead in the first half, but ultimately lost 2–1. Both sides had Lancashire Cup ties on the same day; Bootle played theirs against Preston North End straight afterwards, while Law had to send a reserve team to Bolton Hornets, which also lost. The same season saw the biggest win credited to Law, a 6–0 victory at home to Southport; soon afterwards captain Rylance moved to Southport and essentially took over the town's club.

For the 1882–83 season the club's opponents were much lower key sides than in previous seasons, and the club lost to teams such as Cherry Tree F.C. and Darwen Hibernians. The club had also gone out of the Lancashire Cup in the first round at Farnworth, a comeback from 2–0 down made pointless by a "screw kick" from Williams winning the tie for the home side. The last reference to a game being played by the club was a 9–0 defeat at the emerging Preston North End in January 1883 and the club's Football Association membership lapsed at the end of the 1882–83 season, and was listed as having been a "loss" before the start of the next season.

== Ground ==
The club played at Lane Ends.

== Notable players ==
- Harry Fecitt, FA Cup winner with Blackburn Rovers, played for the club in 1882
- Jimmy Brown, winner of 3 FA Cup winners' medals with Rovers and future England international
- Ralph Rylance, key figure in the history of Southport F.C. and inventor of the artificial football pitch
