= Preston Zingari F.C. =

Former association football club in Lancashire

Preston Zingari
- Full name: Preston Zingari Football Club
- Founded: 1883
- Dissolved: 1885
- Ground: Pleasure Gardens
- Secretary: John McGregor
Home colours

Preston Zingari F.C. was an association football club from Preston, Lancashire, England, active in the 1880s and 1890s.

== History ==
The club, founded by John McGregor, claimed a foundation date of 1880, although the actual foundation date seems to have been 1883, and the earliest reference to the club playing other sides is from July 1883.

The club took a step forward in ambition in the 1884–85 season, plundering the Heart of Midlothian by signing up five of its players (George and Thomas Douglas, James Ferguson, James Renwick, and Jock Scotland) on professional terms, tried to sign goalkeeper "Long" Bob Roberts from West Bromwich Albion, and entered the FA Cup for the first time. It also entered Lancashire Senior Cup that season and in the first round hammered Brierfield 14–0 at the Pleasure Grounds before "a fair number of spectators", ten goals coming in the second half.

The club also attended the early meetings of the proposed British Football Association, which was set up by clubs looking to legalize professionalism in the opposition of the amateur Football Association. The club's involvement with professionalism however meant that it withdrew from the FA Cup, together with opponents Bolton Wanderers and a number of other Lancashire clubs, with Zingari being particularly militant; the club's representative Mr Moore not only seconded a Lancashire F.A. motion refusing to register players with the Football Association, but declared that "if they did not do as they were doing they would be extinguished, and they may as well die with their face to the foe as with their back to them."

The irony was that the club was hoist by its own petard. The FA promptly banned the recalcitrant Lancastrian clubs from playing other FA members, restricting them (at least temporarily) to Lancastrian football, and Zingari lost players it had recently "poached" from Blackburn Park Road, and who wanted to play competitive football, back to the Roadsters. Zingari tried to fill the gap by filling its fixture lists, playing 4 games in 10 days in October 1884, including its second round tie Lancashire Cup tie with Blackburn Rovers (losing 2–1) and, with the strain of such a fixture list, having to send a mostly reserve side to Great Lever, where it lost 11–1.

Further, Zingari never got the chance to enter the FA Cup again; the other senior club in the town, Preston North End, had more serious financial backing and had been a de facto professional club since adopting the association code in 1881. Zingari was simply blown away by its much more powerful neighbour. By the end of the season, interest in the club seemed to have run out. It had never been a great attraction to fans; the match at Burnley only brought in a gate of £4, one of the lowest of the season, and the last recorded senior match for the club was a 6–0 defeat at Everton.

The club tried to continue by amalgamating with Preston Albion in October 1885, but after a dispiriting defeat by Haydock in the new combine's first match, it seems to have given up the ghost. The name was revived in 1887 for a junior club, which played low-grade football at Miller Road until 1891.

== Colours ==
The club wore ruby jerseys.

== Ground ==
The club played at the Pleasure Gardens.

== Notable players ==
- Bethell Robinson, defender, who played for the club in late 1884
