= Blackburn Park Road F.C. =

Former association football club

Blackburn Park Road
- Full name: Blackburn Park Road Football Club
- Nickname: the Roadsters
- Founded: 1875
- Dissolved: 1890
- Ground: Audley Hall Ground, Park Road
1880–87 colours	1887–90 colours

Blackburn Park Road F.C. was a football team formed in 1875. They played in Blackburn, Lancashire, near to the railway station.

== History ==
The club was formed in 1875 out of the Park Road cricket club.

=== Lancashire Senior Cup runners-up ===
Despite some good results they were rarely a match for the two major town teams of that time, Blackburn Rovers and Blackburn Olympic, largely because the Roadsters relied solely on local players. The club did however reach the final of the Lancashire Senior Cup in 1881, in part thanks to an argument between Blackburn Rovers and Darwen F.C. over their quarter-final tie which saw them both expelled from the competition; Park Road beat Bolton Wanderers 6–1 in the semi-final but lost 6–4 to Accrington F.C. in the final at Darwen. The Roadsters walked off the field with five minutes to go in protest at the refereeing, and put in an unsuccessful protest, one reporter stating that the second Accrington goal was seen as handball "by every reporter present" and the sixth Accrington goal was so far offside that "the referee (William Peirce-Dix of Sheffield) was obviously bribed or neglecting his duty as a final judge", another stating that "the greatest wrongdoer in this last piece of business connected with the already ugly career of the Lancashire Association Challenge Cup is the referee of Saturday last".

=== FA Cup appearances ===
In 1883–84 Park Road beat Clitheroe Low Moor 6–0, all of the goals coming in the first half, and Holden scoring a hat-trick. This proved to be the Roadsters' only victory in the main draw of the competition. In the second round, the club lost 3–2 to Accrington to a late goal, having come from 2–0 down, in front of 1,000 spectators. The Owd Reds were consequently disqualified because one of the club's players (Beresford) was a professional, but Park Road declined the invitation to participate in the third round, as the club faced a likely defeat against Blackburn Olympic.

In the 1885–86 competition the club lost 4–2 at Scottish side Third Lanark, having been 2–0 up; the tie only went ahead on the Football Association confirming to the Scottish side that none of the Roadsters was a registered professional, the fear being that the Scottish Football Association's antagonistic attitude to professionalism would lead to a sanction for the Hi-Hi for playing against professional players.

In 1887–88, the club beat (Northern) Irish invitee (Lisburn) Distillery 2–1 in the FA Cup, but Distillery protested on the basis that the pitch markings were not in conformity with the regulations, lacking the centre spot, centre circle, and six-yard arcs; the protest was upheld and rather than replay the tie Park Road scratched from the competition to play Distillery's rivals Cliftonville F.C., who had beaten the Roadsters in the first round the previous year, in a friendly instead. The club however finished the season with its only trophy success, winning the East Lancashire Charity Shield, coming from behind to beat Bell's Temperance of Accrington at Rovers' Leamington Road ground.

=== Lancashire League ===
As the fourth club in Blackburn, behind Rovers, Olympic, and Witton, the club did not consider joining any of the national leagues being set up in the late 1880s. Instead it was a founder member of the Lancashire League in 1889. After a mid-table finish in its one-season, the club left the League, with most of its players being released. The club survived long enough to play in the first round of the Lancashire Junior Cup in 1890–91; its opponent, the second Clitheroe club, forgot to notify its players of the fixture, and therefore could only field 8 players - nevertheless Clitheroe still beat Park Road 2–1 in "the poorest exhibition of football ever seen at the Clitheroe ground". There is no record of the club playing again, with its players joining the new Cob Wall club, but a new Park Road club was founded in 1893.

== Colours ==
The club's original colours were white jerseys, blue knickers, and blue and white hose. In 1880 they changed to light red and blue jerseys, later confirmed as being in halves, and in 1887 to black and yellow stripes.

== Grounds ==
In 1880, the club moved from its original Haslingden Road ground to Place Farm, a mile and a quarter from Blackburn Station. By 1883 the club was playing at the Audley Hall Ground. The club introduced electric floodlighting for three matches in 1889–90, but the experiment was not successful.

== Honours ==
- Lancashire Senior Cup
  - Runner-up 1880–81
- East Lancashire Charity Shield
  - Winner 1887–88

== Notable former players ==
International players:

- (Ireland) (England) Jack Reynolds
- (England) Kelly Houlker, whose international caps came after leaving the Roadsters

== Sources ==
- The Guinness Record of the FA Cup
