= Rossendale F.C. =

Rossendale
- Full name: Rossendale Football Club
- Nickname: The Bicks
- Founded: 1877
- Dissolved: 1897
- Ground: Dark Lane
Late 1880s colours	Lancashire League colours

Rossendale Football Club was an amateur football club based in the village of Newchurch within the Rossendale borough of Lancashire, England. The club was founded in 1877 and was a founder member of the Lancashire League in 1889–90; however the club folded at the end of the 1896–97 season.

== History ==
=== Myrtle Grove years ===
The club was founded in 1877, under the name Myrtle Grove and playing in Cloughfold. The club was a founder member of the Lancashire Football Association in 1878 and its first recorded match was a 1–1 draw against Blackburn Law in October 1878, after the club secretary placed a press advert looking for opponents "within 20 miles distant of Cloughfold". The club played in the first Lancashire Senior Cup, losing 5–4 at home in the first round to Great Lever.

=== Pre-league years ===
For the start of the 1881–82 season, the club moved to Dark Lane in Newchurch and changed its name to Rossendale. It won a tie in the Lancashire Cup for the first time under the new name that season, beating the obscure Barrow Rangers and Back-of-Bank (from Bolton) to reach the third round. In 1882-83 the club got its biggest win, in the same competition, 12–1 over Tong of Bolton.

Two years later the club made its FA Cup debut, losing in the first round to Irwell Springs. In 1884–85 the club was unlucky enough to be drawn away to Blackburn Rovers, in the midst of their hat-trick of Cup wins. In front of a small crowd of 600, Rossendale lost 11–0, with three more goals against being disallowed for offside.

The following season, the club went on its best FA Cup run to date, beating Low Moor in the first round and hammering Padiham 9–1 in the second; Padiham could not field most of its first choice players, as they were recently acquired professionals, and so were ineligible for the competition. The run ended in the third round when Church beat Rossendale 5–1 with three late goals.

The gap between the amateur club and the professionals was shown by heavy defeats in the club's first Cup matches in 1886–87 and 1887–88, the former 10–2 at home to the Glaswegian club Cowlairs (after receiving a bye) in front of a crowd of 2,000, the latter to local rivals Accrington. For 1888–89 the club was placed in the qualifying rounds, being knocked out at the third stage; it did not enter the Cup again until 1892–93, losing in the final qualifying round to Blackpool.

=== Lancashire League years ===
In 1889–90, Rossendale was one of the 14 clubs which founded the Lancashire League. The first season was a difficult one, the club finishing second from bottom with 7 wins from 24 matches (Earlestown was expelled for not fulfilling its fixtures), but by 1891–92 the club was finishing 4th, with two future Football League clubs (Bury and Blackpool) finishing above it. The club even applied to join the Football League in May 1894, but did not get much support.

However, by 1896–97, the village club could no longer compete with the professional and semi-professional sides in the area. It lost in the first qualifying round of the FA Cup to Clitheroe and finished bottom of the Lancashire League, and was wound up at the end of the season.

Two years later a new club, Rossendale United, was formed, playing in the same colours and at the same ground.

== Colours ==
The club's original kit was all navy blue. By 1884 the club had changed to amber and black, and by 1886 to blue and white stripes. By 1893 the club had adopted cardinal shirts with a white sash.

== Notable players ==
Robert Haresnape, former Blackburn Rovers regular
