= Leek F.C. =

Leek
- Full name: Leek Football Club
- Founded: 1872
- Dissolved: 1902
- Ground: Westwood Lane
- Secretary: Sam Henshaw
Home colours

Leek F.C. was an English football club from the town of Leek, Staffordshire.

== History ==
The club claimed a foundation date in 1872, and by the 1876–77 season was established enough to have had a season of 20 matches, winning 14.

Leek's first competitive match for the club was in the first Staffordshire Senior Cup in 1877–78, beating Cobridge in the first round, and losing to eventual winners Stoke in the second.

Leek played in the FA Cup from 1884 to 1893, reaching the Fifth Round in 1886–87. At that stage the club lost 2–0 at home to the Old Carthusians in front of a crowd of 4,000; Leek twice had the ball between the posts, but both times the score was disallowed.

The club joined the Midland Football League for its inaugural season in 1889, but after one season left for The Combination. Leek lasted five Combination seasons, generally finishing near the bottom, and the club left the league after the 1895–96 season, having lost £120 over the season, despite retaining amateur status. A desperate scheme to pay the club's debts by sending out "collecting cards" was unsuccessful, the exercise not even raising £11, and the club took a berth in the North Staffordshire League. The club continued at this low level until 1902, when it merged with other clubs to form Leek United.

== Colours ==
The club wore amber and black until at least 1891. By 1893 the club was wearing white jerseys.

== Ground ==
The club originally played at Abney Road, a mile from Leek railway station. By 1879 it was playing at Westwood Lane and used the George Hotel for facilities.
