= Lancashire League (football) =

Football competition in northern England

The Lancashire League has been the name of two separate football competitions for clubs based in northern England.

== Lancashire League (1889 to 1903) ==
The original Lancashire League was formed in 1889, and was established because of the success of the Football League, which had been established just one year earlier. Prime movers in the formation of the league were the officials of Bury Football Club, who had ambitions to set up a regional competition which would be a stepping stone for them and other clubs to gain a place in the Football League.

Although the majority of the clubs were based in the county of Lancashire, the league did eventually accept several clubs from neighbouring Cheshire. Additionally from further afield, Workington, from Cumberland, were members for two seasons, while Doncaster Rovers, from Yorkshire, were also to make an application to join.

The league survived for fourteen seasons until 1903, and in 1903–04 it became the Second Division of the Lancashire Combination. At the time the Lancashire League was probably the stronger of the two competitions, and within a few years many of the former Lancashire League clubs had become leading Lancashire Combination clubs.

The Lancashire League had many member clubs who would later take up places in the Football League. These included Accrington Stanley, Blackpool, Bury, Crewe Alexandra, Liverpool, Nelson, New Brighton Tower, Southport Central, and Stockport County.

=== Champions ===
List of champions
Season	Champions
1889–90	Higher Walton
1890–91	Bury
1891–92	Bury
1892–93	Liverpool
1893–94	Blackpool
1894–95	Fairfield
1895–96	Nelson
1896–97	Chorley
1897–98	New Brighton Tower
1898–99	Chorley
1899–1900	Stockport County
1900–01	Stalybridge Rovers
1901–02	Darwen
1902–03	Southport Central

=== Member clubs ===
A total of 48 clubs and reserve teams played in the league during its first incarnation:

- Accrington
- Ashton North End
- Bacup
- Barrow
- Blackburn Park Road
- Blackburn Rovers Reserves
- Blackpool
- Bolton Wanderers Reserves
- Burnley Union Star
- Bury
- Chorley
- Clitheroe
- Crewe Alexandra
- Darwen
- Earlestown
- Fairfield
- Fleetwood Rangers
- Halliwell Rovers
- Haydock
- Heywood Central
- Heywood
- Higher Walton
- Horwich
- Hyde
- Liverpool
- Liverpool South End
- Middleton
- Nelson
- New Brighton Tower
- Oldham County
- Oswaldtwistle Rovers
- Prescot
- Rochdale (1896)
- Rochdale Town
- Rossendale
- South Liverpool
- South Shore
- Southport Central
- St Helens Recreation
- St Helens Town
- Stalybridge Rovers
- Stockport County
- Warrington
- West Manchester
- White Star Wanderers
- Wigan County
- Wigan United
- Witton
- Workington

== Lancashire League (1939 to date) ==
The second Lancashire League was formed in 1939, and for the 1939–40 season it was a competition mainly for the 'A' teams of Lancashire Football League clubs; however, with the onset of World War II, the new league was to last only one season before being abandoned.

In 1949 the league was re-established, and for almost fifty years it was a competition largely for the junior sides of the Lancashire-based Football League clubs. For most seasons, two divisions were operated; however, for a short period from the late 1950s there were three divisions. Some non-league clubs' reserve sides were later accepted into membership, and with the Football League taking a greater responsibility for youth football in recent seasons, the Lancashire League is now a competition exclusively for non-league clubs' reserve sides. From 2006–07 the league was sponsored by Lancit Haulage Limited, and from 2010–11 the league has been sponsored by GalaxyFootball.co.uk.

=== Champions ===
Season	Division One		
1939–40	Preston North End 'A'		
1949–50	Blackpool 'A'		
1950–51	Preston North End 'A'		
1951–52	Stockport County Reserves		
1952–53	Burnley 'A'		
1953–54	Rochdale Reserves		
1954–55	Manchester United 'B'		
Season	Division One	Division Two	
1955–56	Oldham Athletic Reserves	Burnley 'B'	
1956–57	Burnley 'A'	Bolton Wanderers 'B'	
Season	Division One	Division Two	Division Three
1957–58	Rochdale Reserves	Everton 'B'	Blackburn Rovers 'C'
1958–59	Preston North End 'A'	Everton 'B'	Bury 'B'
1959–60	Bolton Wanderers 'A'	Everton 'B'	Manchester City 'C'
1960–61	Burnley 'A'	Bolton Wanderers 'B'	Liverpool 'C'
Season	Division One	Division Two	
1961–62	Burnley 'A'	Liverpool 'B'	
1962–63	Everton 'A'	Everton 'B'	
1963–64	Everton 'A'	Everton 'B'	
1964–65	Everton 'A'	Manchester United 'B'	
1965–66	Liverpool 'A'	Liverpool 'B'	
1966–67	Everton 'A'	Manchester City 'B'	
1967–68	Liverpool 'A'	Liverpool 'B'	
1968–69	Liverpool 'A'	Manchester City 'B'	
1969–70	Everton 'A'	Manchester United 'B'	
1970–71	Everton 'A'	Blackburn Rovers 'A'	
1971–72	Liverpool 'A'	Manchester United 'B'	
1972–73	Stockport County 'A'	Liverpool 'B'	
1973–74	Wigan Athletic Reserves	Everton 'B'	
1974–75	Everton 'A'	Everton 'B'	
1975–76	Oldham Athletic Reserves	Liverpool 'B'	
1976–77	Oldham Athletic Reserves	Liverpool 'B'	
1977–78	Liverpool 'A'	Burnley 'A'	
1978–79	Port Vale Reserves	Burnley 'A'	
1979–80	Tranmere Rovers Reserves	Everton 'B'	
1980–81	Oldham Athletic Reserves	Burnley 'A'	
1981–82	Wigan Athletic Reserves	Blackburn Rovers 'A'	
1982–83	Liverpool 'A'	Oldham Athletic 'A'	
1983–84	Manchester United 'A'	Morecambe Reserves	
1984–85	Manchester United 'A'	Blackburn Rovers 'A'	
1985–86	Manchester City 'A'	Oldham Athletic 'A'	
1986–87	Manchester United 'A'	Preston North End 'A'	
1987–88	Manchester United 'A'	Oldham Athletic 'A'	
1988–89	Everton 'A'	Manchester United 'B'	
1989–90	Manchester United 'A'	Blackpool 'A'	
1990–91	Manchester United 'A'	Crewe Alexandra 'B'	
1991–92	Crewe Alexandra 'A'	Crewe Alexandra 'B'	
1992–93	Manchester United 'A'	Liverpool 'B'	
1993–94	Burnley 'A'	Preston North End 'A'	
1994–95	Manchester United 'A'	Manchester City 'B'	
1995–96	Manchester United 'A'	Blackburn Rovers 'B'	
1996–97	Manchester United 'A'	Manchester United 'B'	
1997–98	Manchester United 'A'	Blackburn Rovers 'B'	
Season	Division One		
1998–99	Tranmere Rovers 'A'		
1999–00	Southport Reserves		
2000–01	Morecambe Reserves		
2001–02	Morecambe Reserves		
2002–03	Morecambe Reserves		
2003–04	Morecambe Reserves		
2004–05	Morecambe Reserves		
2005–06	Morecambe Reserves		
Season	East Division	West Division	
2006–07	Farsley Celtic Reserves	Morecambe Reserves	
2007–08	Farsley Celtic Reserves	Workington Reserves	
2008–09	Bradford (PA) Reserves	Fleetwood Town Reserves	
2009–10	Harrogate Town Reserves	Southport Reserves	
2010–11	Bradford (PA) Reserves	Bamber Bridge Reserves	
2011–12	Thackley Reserves	Lancaster City Reserves	
2012–13	Ossett Albion Reserves	Lancaster City Reserves	
2013–14	F.C. United of Manchester Reserves	AFC Fylde Reserves	
