= South Shore F.C. =

English football club

South Shore
- Full name: South Shore Football Club
- Nickname: the Shoreites
- Founded: 1879 (147 years ago) (as Blackpool South Shore)
- Dissolved: 1899 (127 years ago)
- Ground: Cow Gap Lane
Home colours	Away colours

South Shore Football Club was an English football club based in the South Shore area of Blackpool, United Kingdom.

== History ==
South Shore Football Club was founded as (Blackpool) South Shore in 1879. The club's first appearance on the national stage was with its entry to the 1882–83 FA Cup, but it only won one match in the competition until the 1885–86 season. In that year (the first in which the club paid its players, albeit only half-a-crown per match), the club caused a major surprise by reaching the quarter-final; in the fifth round, the club was drawn at home to Notts County, and resisted a "very advantageous offer" to switch the tie to the County ground, and the Football Association rejected a County protest as to the state of the South Shore ground. Its stance was rewarded with a crowd of 3,000 attending to watch a 2–1 win, the winning goal coming in the 86th minute, from a scrimmage in which three players bundled goalkeeper Sherwin into dropping the ball for Richard Elston to tap home. County had to play much of the match with ten men, with full-back Snook carried off with what proved to be a broken ankle after he over-exuberantly charged Tattersall.

In the quarter-final, South Shore played host to the Swifts of Slough, in front of 4,000, and took the lead after five minutes; but on the half-hour a free-kick from Holden-White was deflected into his own net by Westhead, and George Brann gave the visitors the lead just before half-time. Despite dominating the second half, the Shoreites could not get the equaliser, Richard Elston coming the closest with a shot which Edwards pushed onto the post.

With the Football League starting in 1888, South Shore joined a rival competition, the Combination. While the Combination was intended to be an alternative for teams not admitted to the League, poor management and other issues saw the league collapse before the end of its first season.

During their lone season in the Combination, the club travelled to Chatham for the first round of the FA Cup; however, Chatham's ground at the time was an open field with no facilities to take admissions, meaning there would be no revenue to cover South Shore's travel costs. Following the 2–1 loss, South Shore filed a complaint with the Lancashire County Football Association, which would eventually lead to the Football Association changing the FA Cup eligibility rules to require clubs to play in an enclosed ground.

Following the conclusion of the Football League's first season in 1889, a re-election process was held for the four worst-performing teams - Burnley, Derby County, Notts County and Stoke City. While South Shore filed for election to the League, the bid received no votes and Burnley, Derby, Notts County, and Stoke were all re-elected. While most other unsuccessful applicants joined the Football Alliance, South Shore chose to remain unaffiliated for the 1889–90 season. This led to the rise of the recently formed Blackpool as the town's primary football club. South Shore joined Blackpool in the Lancashire League ahead of the 1891–92 season.

Prior the 1896–97 season, Blackpool applied for Football League membership and, prior to the vote, an agreement was made by the two clubs to amalgamate if Blackpool were successful; there had been occasional previous considerations for amalgamation, in particular after the 1891–92 season when South Shore returned a profit for the year of £2 on a £522 income, but still had debts of over £100. After Blackpool was voted into the League, South Shore pulled out of the deal. South Shore remained in the Lancashire League while Blackpool played three seasons in the Football League Second Division before losing a re-election vote following the 1898–99 season.

Both clubs began the 1899–1900 season in the Lancashire League. On 9 December, an agreement was reached following a match between the two sides where Blackpool would absorb South Shore; Blackpool duly signed on four South Shore players for Lancashire League fixtures, while other players had their contracts cancelled. South Shore's record for the season (3 wins, 2 draws, and 5 defeats) was subsequently expunged.

== Attempted revival ==
In May 2021, it was reported that South Shore was being reformed as a phoenix club, and its prospective chairman stated his aim for the club to play in the West Lancashire League as early as 2022. However, South Shore Football Club Ltd, the company behind the potential revival, filed to be struck from the Companies House register in April 2022.

== Colours ==
The club wore Oxford blue jerseys and white knickers. Its change shirt was white.

== Ground ==
The club initially played on a ground off Lytham Avenue, moving to a ground at Cow Gap Lane in 1885. In October 1899, South Shore moved to Bloomfield Road, which became the home ground of Blackpool F.C. after the two clubs merged in December of that year.
