= 1892–93 Lincoln City F.C. season =

Lincoln City F.C.
1892–93 season
- Honorary Secretary: Jack Strawson
- Ground: John O'Gaunts
- Football League Second Division: 9th
- FA Cup: Fourth round qualifier (eliminated by Grimsby)
- Lincolnshire Senior Cup: Final (eliminated by Gainsborough Trinity)
- Top goalscorer: League: Frank Smallman (17); All: Frank Smallman (19)
Home colours

The 1892–93 season was the ninth season of competitive association football played by Lincoln City F.C. After finishing in ninth position in the Football Alliance in 1891–92, Lincoln City was one of 12 clubs elected to the newly formed Second Division for the 1892–93 Football League season.

During the season, City coped well at home winning six of their 11 matches, but all season they constantly struggled only winning once at Burslem Port Vale, in the second half of the season Lincoln did score five goals in three home matches with Frank Smallman becoming the first Lincoln City player to score a hat-trick in the football league when he netted four against Burton Swifts in February. At the end of the season Lincoln finished 9th in the league and had to apply for re-election which was successful as the division was to be expanded to 16 teams.

In the 1892-93 FA Cup Lincoln entered at the first qualifying round and after beating Newark Town, Greenhalgh's and Rotherham Town, they succumbed to a heavy 0–5 defeat away at local rivals Grimsby Town.

In all competitive league and cup matches Lincoln used 20 players and had 10 different goalscorers, William Gresham, Quentin Neill, Frank Smallman and James Gresham played in all 22 league games and the six cup matches, Frank Smallman scored 19 goals in total while no other player reached double figures.

== Background ==
Although Lincoln City struggled in the 1891–92 season in the Football Alliance finishing in 9th place and with debts of £110, the committee decided to spend a sizeable sum over the close season on summer wages and signing-on fees, the new recruits were goalkeeper William Gresham from Gainsborough Trinity, back Charles Coulton from Birmingham St George's and forwards James Kelly from Renton F.C. and finally Robert Cameron from Clydebank.

== Review ==
=== September ===
Lincoln City started their campaign at Bramall Lane against Sheffield Utd, the start was delayed by 35 minutes due to Lincoln turning up late and then they were a goal behind within 10 minutes, Robert Cameron scored Lincoln City's first ever football league goal before Sheffield regained the lead before half time, the game ended 2–4 in favour of the home side with Irving scoring the other Lincoln goal.

The "Cits" had to wait three weeks before their next league game when they played away against Small Heath, but had no joy again as they found themselves four goals behind by the interval, they did manage to gain a consolation goal in the second half.

=== October ===
Lincoln's first home game was the reverse against Sheffield Utd, Mick Richardson came into the side for his debut, there were no goals in the first half, but a goal by Cameron secured Lincoln's first win and points of the season.

After their first win they travelled to meet Walsall Town Swifts who had yet to win in the league, the game started in a rain storm and the first half ended goalless, but not long after the break Lincoln scored the first goal, "this roused Walsall" who then equalised and carried on pressing, then with five minutes to go Walsall scored the winner and secured their first win of the season.

Lincoln entered the FA Cup at the 1st qualifying stage and were drawn at home against Newark, wet weather prevailed and was played under protest, Lincoln went one nil up after 10 minutes but Newark levelled just before half-time, Shaw got injured and had to retire, Lincoln had the better of the second half and finished winners by 3–1. Newark protested to the FA due to the bad state of the pitch so the match was ordered to be replayed at Newark.

Before the replay Lincoln played host to Burslem Port Vale, and it wasn't long before the visitors were 2–0 up, before half-time Smallman scored out of a scrimmage, in the second half the home side pressed forward and Gresham levelled, then the visitors put on the pressure and scored twice in four minutes before Smallman scored a late goal, thus ending the match 3–4 to the visitors.

In the replayed FA Cup match at Newark the home side went one up within the first five minutes before Kelly and Irving (2) scored for Lincoln, the home side came back with two goals of their own before a goal from a scrimmage put Lincoln through to the next round.

Just two days later Lincoln travelled to Greenhalgh's F.C. for the 2nd round qualifying tie in the FA Cup, a big crowd gathered due to the home team's good form, not long after the start Moore scored for Lincoln, it stayed like that till the second half when Lincoln scored two more goals, according to the Nottingham Evening Post both goalkeepers made "splendid" and "capital" saves, and in the end Lincoln won 3–0.

=== November ===
Their next fixture was an away friendly fixture against Woolwich Arsenal, although Lincoln lost 0–4, it was noted for the appearance of Welsh International Bob Roberts playing in Lincoln colours having signed from Preston North End F.C

Roberts made his official debut a week later in the home league match against second place Darwen F.C., with Lincoln lying bottom of the league with two points, Lincolnshire Chronicle reported of the home fans "sanguine anticipation", and Lincoln didn't let their fans down, Smallman gave them a first half lead, in the second half Lincoln had their chances to improve the scoreline but it was Darwen who pressed near the end and after striking the crossbar they eventually grabbed a leveller.

Next up was the home tie against Rotherham Town in the FA Cup 3rd qualifying round, 3000 spectators watched the match, although a close tie, Smallman and Irving put Lincoln 2 up before half time and the score stayed the same, so Lincoln progressed to the next round.

=== December ===
This was a busy month for Lincoln they played five league games and one FA Cup match, first up was the away fixture at Burslem Port Vale, although the opening exchanges were even, Lincoln were soon leading by two goals, before Burslem pulled one back before half time, the home side pressed forward in the second half but were unable to add another goal, thus giving Lincoln their first away league win.

Next up was the away tie in the 4th FA Cup qualifying against local rivals Grimsby Town, on a frozen pitch covered in sand the match went ahead in front of 4000 supporters, but it was a day to forget as Lincoln were soundly beaten 0–5.

Lincoln were back in bottom position after their visit to Burton Swifts, the game was fairly even until the 25th minute when attempting to save the ball Roberts put into his own net, and by half-time Burton had doubled their lead, after the restart the Swifts scored two more before Lincoln started to play better and Jock Fleming scored twice, but the game finished 2–4.

Over the Christmas period Lincoln had two home games, first up was third place Ardwick, Lincoln's Smallman scored the opener in the first half then both teams scored in the second half giving Lincoln an unexpected win.

Boxing Day was a bank holiday so around 2000 turned up to watch Lincoln host Crewe Alexandra, the match was played in dense fog and before Jock Fleming scored before half time Smallman had hit the bar and Crewe had a goal disallowed for offside, in the second half Crewe played stubbornly before equalizing near the end to earn a point.

Lincoln visited Northwich Victoria on New Year's Eve, a match watched by a 1000 spectators, Victoria won by 2–1 and it could have been a lot more if it hadn't been for the Lincoln backs.

=== January ===
The New Year started with a home game against Small Heath, played in bitterly cold conditions on a hard surface, Lincoln went in at half time 2–1 leaders after being 1 down after 20 minutes, a goal each after the interval restored Lincoln's 1-goal lead, but the win was lost in the last fifteen minutes when Small Heath scored twice.

A week later Lincoln made the long trip to Darwen and within a minute of the start Lincoln were losing 0–1, Darwen continued to press and scored again before Roberts scored his first Lincoln goal from a free kick, in the second half Darwen scored again, they carried on pressing but shooting was made difficult due to the ice.

Two weeks later Lincoln were again on their travels this time to Crewe Alexandra, they started better this time with James Gresham scoring in the first five minutes, Lincoln continued to have the better of the play then just before half time they conceded three goals in just three minutes, in the second half they added another, so Lincoln lost 1–4, their fourth defeat in a row.

=== February ===
After another two-week league break Lincoln needed some luck and the weather did its part when Burton Swifts visited, defending against the wind the home side only conceded one goal before half time, after the interval it was a different story with Lincoln playing with the wind they scored five times with Frank Smallman netting four, thus scoring Lincoln City's first ever Professional League hat trick.

A week later Lincoln visited Grimsby Town for the first Lincolnshire derby in the Football League and according to the Lincolnshire Echo "a small band of 400 to 500 went out to Grimsby". It turned out to be a good match with both teams scoring in each half to share the points, Smallman bagged himself another two goals.

Northwich Victoria were up next at the John O'Gaunts ground and although the visitors were lying higher in the league table Lincoln were full of confidence, but very early on in the match Northwich took the lead, but before half time Smallman leveled the game with his seventh goal in three matches, the second half was a different matter as City scored three goals in as many minutes and just before the end Northwich scored an own goal, so in consecutive home matches Lincoln have won by 5–1.

=== March ===
Lincoln were at home again on the first Saturday in March against Lincolnshire rivals Grimsby Town, after three matches without defeat a lot was expected from the 3000 crowd and early on J.Gresham gave the home side the lead, but after that it was all Grimsby who went on to win the game 3–1. A Lincolnshire Echo columnist reported "The City were very disappointing" and "it is time the Committee began to look up some new blood for next season" and "advised they fight shy of third rate Scotch men as long as there is a decent local man to be caught hold off."

It was over three weeks before Lincoln's next league game and that was another home match this time against Walsall Town Swifts, in front of 2000 spectators the game kicked off at 3:30 pm, and within five minutes Smallman put Lincoln ahead, all the action happened in the first half with Smallman scoring three times for his second hat trick of the season and making his tally off 10 goals in last five matches.

=== April ===
Due to Easter this was Lincoln's second game in two days and their last at home in the league this season, they entertained Bootle and it was an evenly contested first half with Cits leading 1–0 thanks to a Raby goal, in the second half Lincoln had scored two more within six minutes off the start, Bootle scored a tame goal in reply before Lincoln added another two, so for the third time Lincoln had won a match by 5–1.

Lincoln's last two matches of the season were both away and played within three days, both ended in defeat firstly against Bootle where they lost 1–4, then two days layer they suffered a 1–3 defeated to Ardwick, in both matches Moore scored the Lincoln goals.

== Match details ==
=== Football League Second Division ===
Date	League position	Opponents	Venue	Result	Score F–A	Scorers	Attendance
3 September 1892	7th	Sheffield Utd	A	L	2–4	Cameron, Irving	4,000
24 September 1892	11th	Small Heath	A	L	1–4	Kelly	3,000
1 October 1892	11th	Sheffield Utd	H	W	1–0	Cameron	2,000
8 October 1892	11th	Walsall Town Swifts	A	L	1–2	Unknown	1,500
22 October 1892	12th	Burslem Port Vale	H	L	3–4	Smallman 2, J.Gresham	1,500
12 November 1892	12th	Darwen	H	D	1–1	Smallman	
3 December 1892	11th	Burslem Port Vale	A	W	2–1	J.Gresham, Cameron	
17 December 1892	12th	Burton Swifts	A	L	2–4	Fleming 2	
24 December 1892	9th	Ardwick	H	W	2–1	Smallman, Richardson	
26 December 1892	8th	Crewe Alexandra	H	D	1–1	Fleming	2000
31 December 1892	10th	Northwich Victoria	A	L	1–2	Moore	1000
7 January 1893	11th	Small Heath	H	L	3–4	J.Gresham, Smallman, Fleming	1500
14 January 1893	11th	Darwen	A	L	1–3	Roberts	2000
28 January 1893	11th	Crewe Alexandra	A	L	1–4	J.Gresham	
11 February 1893	10th	Burton Swifts	H	W	5–1	Smallman 4, Irving	
18 February 1893	9th	Grimsby Town	A	D	2–2	Smallman 2	
25 February 1893	9th	Northwich Victoria	H	W	5–1	Smallman, Richardson, Raby, Fleming, Own-goal	
4 March 1893	9th	Grimsby Town	H	L	1–3	J.Gresham	3000
31 March 1893	9th	Walsall Town Swifts	H	W	3–1	Smallman 3	2000
1 April 1893	8th	Bootle	H	W	5–1	Raby 2, Smallman 2, Roberts	2000
15 April 1893	9th	Bootle	A	L	1–4	Moore	
17 April 1893	9th	Ardwick	A	L	1–3	Moore	2000

=== FA Cup ===
Round	Date	Opponents	Venue	Result	Score F–A	Scorers	Attendance
1st Qual	15 October 1892	Newark	H	W	3–1	Kelly, Irving 2	
Re-match	27 October 1892	Newark	A	W	4–3	Kelly, Irving 2, Unknown	
2nd Qual	29 October 1892	Greenhalgh's	A	W	3–0	Moore, Smallman, Cameron	
3rd Qual	19 November 1892	Rotherham Town	H	W	2–0	Smallman, Irving	
4th Qual	10 December 1892	Grimsby Town	A	L	0–5		4000

=== Lincolnshire Cup ===
Round	Date	Opponents	Venue	Result	Score F–A	Scorers	Attendance	Ref
Final	5 April 1893	Gainsborough Trinity	The Northolme, Gainsborough	L	0–4		3000	

=== Other matches ===
Date	Opponents	Venue	Result	Score F–A	Scorers	Attendance	Notes
8 September 1892	Nottingham Forest	A	L	1–3	J.Gresham	2000	Friendly match
10 September 1892	Gainsborough Trinity	A	W	2–1	Cameron, Kelly		Friendly match
14 September 1892	Nottingham Forest	H	L	2–3	Shaw, Cameron		Friendly match
17 September 1892	Rotherham Town	H	W	3–1	Irving, Smallman, Unknown	2000	Friendly match
29 September 1892	Grimsby Town	N	D	2–2			At Mablethorpe-match abandoned
20 October 1892	Grimsby Town	A	L	3–5			Benefit match for David Riddoch
5 November 1892	Woolwich Arsenal	A	L	0–4			Friendly match
26 November 1892	Grimsby Town	H	L	3–6			Friendly match
27 December 1892	London Casuals	H	D	1–1			Friendly match
21 January 1893	1st Royal Scots	H	W	3–2	Roberts, Unknown (2)	1000	Friendly match
11 March 1893	Grantham Rovers	H	L	1–2			Friendly match
18 March 1893	Newark	H	W	3–1	Raby, Irving, Unknown		Lincoln Charity Cup (semi-final)
25 March 1893	Grimsby Town	A	L	2–4	Smallman, J.Gresham		Friendly match
4 April 1893	Rotherham Town	A	L	0–4		5000	Friendly match
20 April 1893	Gainsborough Trinity	H	W	3–0	Smallman, Irving (2)		Lincoln Charity Cup (Final)
22 April 1893	Burton Wanderers	H	W	4–0	Irving, Roberts, Moore, Raby		Friendly match
26 April 1893	Grimsby Town	H	L	2–3	Roberts, Smallman		Benefit match for Arthur Marriott
29 April 1893	Gainsborough Trinity	H	W	3–0	Mettam, Graham, Raby		Friendly match

== Squad statistics ==
This table includes appearances and goals in nationally organised competitions – the Football League and FA Cup – only.

Name	Position	League apps	League goals	FA Cup apps	FA Cup goals	Total apps	Total goals
William Gresham	Goalkeeper	22	0	5	0	27	0
Quentin Neill	Full back	22	0	5	0	27	0
A Jackson	Full back	2	0	1	0	3	0
Charles Coulton	Full back	12	0	5	0	17	0
Edward Mettam	Half back	15	0	3	0	18	0
George Shaw	Half back	4	0	1	0	5	0
John Richardson	Half back	17	2	3	0	20	2
George Buxton	Half back	0	0	1	0	1	0
John Irving	Forward	20	2	5	4	25	6
Frank Smallman	Forward	22	17	5	2	27	19
William Raby	Forward	7	3	0	0	7	3
James Kelly	Forward	8	1	5	2	13	3
Robert Cameron	Forward	15	3	5	1	20	4
Isaac Moore	Forward	22	3	4	0	26	3
James Gresham	Forward	22	5	5	0	27	5
Robert Roberts	Half back	16	2	1	0	17	2
James Fleming	Forward	11	5	0	0	11	5
George Brammer	Half back	2	0	0	0	2	0
Robert McDermid	Half back	2	0	0	0	2	0
William Graham	Forward	1	0	0	0	1	0
