= Midland Alliance (1890) =

Midland Football Alliance
- Founded: 1890
- Abolished: 1893
- Region: England
- Most championships: Derby County reserves (2 titles)

The Midland Alliance was an association football league for teams in the Midlands of England, which ran for three seasons in the 1890s.

== History ==
The League was set up at a meeting at the Maypole Hotel in Nottingham in June 1890. The aim was to form a competition akin to the Midland League for clubs overlooked for that particular division; nine clubs initially pledged to join, with an invitation sent to Football League club Notts County for its reserve side (the Rovers) to take part. County duly accepted and 10 teams formed the first league, officially called the Midland Football Alliance, but almost always referred to as the Midland Alliance.

=== 1890–91 season ===
Rotherham Swifts, after winning only one of its first five matches, withdrew from the league in December 1890. Although the Alliance initially refused to accept the club's resignation, another member, Jardines, was suspended by the Football Association for non-payment of a fine. On 17 April 1891 it was decided to expunge both clubs' records; this did not have any effect on the overall table, as Notts County Rovers were uncatchable, although it made the gap a little smaller as Jardines' only win had come against Rovers.

=== 1891–92 season ===
Five new clubs were elected into the competition, including three reserve sides - those of Derby County (the Wanderers), Lincoln City (the Swifts), and Long Eaton Rangers (the Athletic). Leicester Fosse and Boston also applied to join, but were not elected; Sheffield, having finished bottom in the first season, was forced to apply for re-election, but was voted back in.

Grantham Rovers, despite finishing fourth the previous season, decided not to enter again, as the club's debts had increased to £44 and it had to undertake a new guarantee scheme in order to continue at all; instead it sought bigger gates by joining the Midland League, and the club was replaced by its rival Grantham Town. Two other clubs – Doncaster Rovers and Loughborough – also left for the Midland League.

The 1891–92 season saw each of the 10 clubs play out their entire fixtures, and Derby County Wanderers took the title, with 88 goals scored in 18 matches, more than double the total of runner-up Mansfield Town.

=== 1892–93 season ===
The third season of the Alliance was its final season. Mansfield Town was elected to the Midland League in May 1892; in June 1892 the Alliance voted to accept neighbours Greenhalgh's as a replacement, with two other clubs proposed by Mr Longdon of Newark, Matlock and the Nottingham Forest reserves, also accepted at the same time. However, Newark in turn withdrew shortly afterwards to join the Midland League, and the Sheffield United reserve side, the Strollers, which had been turned down by the Sheffield & District Football League, was elected as a replacement.

The division suffered an early blow when Grantham Town withdrew in December, having played just three matches (one win, draw, and defeat each). The remaining eleven clubs however completed their fixtures, and the Derby County reserves (now called Derby Town) again took the title, having secured the crown with 2 matches still to play. One match was never finished; the game between Lincoln City Swifts and Heanor Town at John O'Gaunts in January was abandoned while scoreless with 13 minutes remaining, after Lincoln goalkeeper Johns was sent off for kicking an opponent (allegedly in retaliation), and the crowd invaded the pitch. Heanor claimed both points, but the Alliance ordered that the result stand as 0–0, with Heanor keeping its point for a draw, and Lincoln having its point deducted.

=== Disbanding ===
The Alliance held a meeting for admission of new clubs on 12 June 1893, but only two clubs – Derby Town and Notts Olympic – turned up, along with honorary secretary Mr Hines. Given that most of the other clubs had found berths in different competitions, the three attendees voted to suspend the requirements for a quorum, and to disband the Alliance.

== Clubs and points totals ==
| Club | 1890–91 | 1891–92 | 1892–93 |
|---|---|---|---|
| Derby County Wanderers/Derby Town | – | 31 | 34 |
| Doncaster Rovers | 17 | – | – |
| Grantham Rovers | 14 | – | – |
| Grantham Town | – | 11 | – |
| Greenhalgh's | – | – | 26 |
| Heanor Town | 12 | 18 | 25 |
| Lincoln City Swifts | – | 15 | 16 |
| Long Eaton Athletic | – | 12 | 5 |
| Loughborough | 16 | – | – |
| Mansfield Town | – | 28 | – |
| Matlock | – | – | 19 |
| Newark | 12 | 22 | – |
| Nottingham Forest Swifts | – | – | 26 |
| Notts County Rovers | 22 | 24 | 20 |
| Notts Olympic | 9 | 8 | 14 |
| Sheffield | 8 | 11 | 5 |
| Sheffield United Strollers | – | – | 27 |
