= Basford Rovers F.C. =

English former football club, based in Nottingham

Basford Rovers
- Full name: Basford Rovers Football Club
- Nickname: the Rovers
- Founded: 1878
- Dissolved: 1889; 137 years ago
- Ground: Vernon Road, Nottingham
- Secretary: John Chamberlain, T. Towlson, H. Maskery
Home colours

Basford Rovers Football Club was an English football club from Nottingham.

== History ==
The club was founded in 1878, and the first recorded match for the club was a draw with Annesley in 1880; a match that was stopped early because of a serious injury to one of the Basford forwards.

The club was one of the 19 the first edition of the Nottingham Association Challenge Cup in 1883. The club drew a bye in the first round and lost to Nottingham Wanderers in the quarter-finals in a replay by six goals to two.

The following year the club reached the semi-finals, where they were drawn to play Nottingham Forest; it was the first time the clubs had met as the Rovers were not prominent enough to be on the friendly schedules of the bigger clubs in the region, such as Forest, Notts County, or Notts Rangers. The gulf in class was shown by Forest winning 6–1, despite going behind, before a crowd of 1,500.

The club had a similar outcome in 1885–86; again reaching the semi-final, again playing one of the bigger Nottingham clubs, this time Rangers, and again going down to a heavy defeat, this time 7–0.

=== FA Cup entries ===
Presumably encouraged by these runs, the club entered the FA Cup for the first time in 1886–87, being drawn to play Notts County in the first round. However, before the season started, Basford "lost so many men that they were very weak". The writing was on the wall given the results of the Rovers' first matches of the season, which included a 5–0 loss at Staveley, an 8–0 defeat at Burton Wanderers, and a first round exit in the Notts Cup to Notts Swifts on the Forest recreation grounds by a score of 3–1. The result of the County tie was predictable but the scoreline was perhaps not; County, playing in their then usual chocolate and blue, rang up 13 goals without reply.

Remarkably the club recovered enough to enter the Cup the following year, and even won its first round tie with Lincoln Albion, 3–2, all of the goals coming in the first half. The club was however drawn against Notts County in the second round, and, given the attendance of the previous season's match was a mere 800, and the result was a formality, Basford accepted an inducement to scratch from the competition, while County played a prestige friendly against Preston North End instead.

The club entered the FA Cup once after qualifying rounds were introduced, losing to Notts Mellors in the second qualifying round in 1888–89, and the club continued to struggle in friendlies, losing 7–0 to Derby St Lukes, 5–1 to Notts Olympic, and 2–0 to Notts Swifts, all in January 1889; 7–0 at Newark (with Maskery's goalkeeping for the Rovers being singled out as "extremely good") and 6–1 at Matlock in February; and 5–0 at Boston in March.

It was obvious the club could no longer compete at a level even below the senior, and it seems to have wound up at the end of the season. The name was revived in 1893 for two seasons at a much lower level (finishing sixth out of nine in the Notts Leen Valley Football League in 1894–95) and periodically afterwards.

== Colours ==
The club wore black and white stripes.

== Ground ==
The club originally played at Marmion Road, using the Pear Tree In for facilities, moving to Vernon Road for 1885–86, albeit still using the Pear Tree Inn.
