= Boston F.C. =

Boston F.C. or Boston Football Club may refer to one of these association football (soccer) clubs:

== England ==
- Boston F.C. (1878), Boston, Lincolnshire, football club from the 1880s
- Boston Town F.C. (1894), Boston, Lincolnshire, football club which played in the Midland Football League in the 1920s
- Boston Town F.C., Boston, Lincolnshire of the United Counties League Premier Division (tiers 9-10 of the English football league system)
- Boston United F.C., Boston, Lincolnshire of the National League North (tier 6 of the English football league system)

== United States ==
- Boston City FC, Malden, Massachusetts (near Boston), of the National Premier Soccer League, the fourth tier of the United States soccer league system
- FC Boston, Waban, Massachusetts (near Boston), of the Premier Development League, unofficially the premier men's amateur soccer league of the United States and Canada
- New England Revolution, Foxborough, Massachusetts (near Boston) of Major League Soccer, the premier soccer league of the United States and Canada

== See also ==
- Boston RFC (disambiguation)
- Boston Soccer Club, an historic soccer club in Boston, Massachusetts in the 1920s
- New England Patriots, Foxborough, Massachusetts of the National Football League, the premier American football league in the United States
