= Lincoln Albion F.C. =

Lincoln Albion
- Full name: Lincoln Albion Football Club
- Nickname: the Albions
- Founded: 1875
- Dissolved: 1888
- Ground: South Park
- President: W. H. Morton
- Secretary: G. G. Boulton

Lincoln Albion Football Club was an English football club from Lincoln.

== History ==
The club was formed from players of the Lincoln Albion cricket club, which had been active since at least 1850, and started playing football in 1875, with a match against Market Rasen. Its first reported football match was a draw with the Grantham Conservatives at the Cowpaddle on 1 March 1878.

The club's ethos was amateurism and working class:

a good old‐fashioned club of working men athletes, whose success is entirely dependent on their own exertions and subscriptions, and who play on one of the extensive common lands of Lincoln...The luxury of enclosed grounds with big “gates”and wealthy patrons are unknown to them, but a genuine love of the game itself has always kept them fairly well going.

The Albion was a regular entrant in the Lincolnshire Senior Cup from 1882, its best run being to the semi-finals in 1883–84, losing to Spilsby by the only goal.

The arrival of professional football, and the foundation of Lincoln City, had a deleterious effect on the club, as it lost a number of players to the Cits. By the time the club made its only entry to the FA Cup, in 1887–88, the club was not the force it once was. The club lost 3–2 in the first round to Basford Rovers in Nottingham, all of the goals coming in the first half; with ten minutes' remaining the Albion had a goal disallowed for handball.

Despite the hopes of the Athletic News that "the experience may bring more support and more members to the club", the club appears only to have played twice more; losing in the first round of the local cup to Grimsby Humber Rovers and a low-key friendly against a Wesleyan chapel side; the club arranged further fixtures but did not seem to play them off.

== Ground ==
The club did not have a permanent enclosed ground; it hosted matches variously at Cowpaddle or South Park.
