= Jardines F.C. =

English former football club, based in Nottingham

Jardines
- Full name: Jardines Football Club
- Founded: 1874
- Dissolved: 1919; 107 years ago
- Ground: Forest Recreation
Home colours

Jardines F.C. was an English association football club from Nottingham, England.

== History ==
=== Formation and name ===
The club was the works side for the John Jardine manufacturing company in Nottingham, formed in 1850 and a manufacturer of machinery for the lace industry. The club claimed a foundation date of 1874, but there is no record of it playing matches against any external opposition until 1884, so for the first decade the club presumably only arranged matches between members.

The club registered its name as Jardines. The media were inconsistent in referring to the club as Jardines or Jardine's, sometimes within the same article; sometimes the media referred to the club as Nottingham Jardines or Notts Jardines, especially when playing outside Nottinghamshire.

=== Expansion into the wider game ===
Ernest Jardine, the son of the company founder, was a footballer for Nottingham Forest in the early 1880s and it may have been his impetus to have the club play against external opposition. At least one other works side in Nottingham, Mellors Limited, was also looking for a wider challenge.

The club joined the Nottinghamshire Football Association in 1884 and entered the Nottingham Senior Cup for the first time. In the first round, the club beat the Eastwood Collieries side 3–1, but Eastwood objected because "Jardine's had played four men contrary to Rule 22, which said that no club should play any man in a Cup tie who had not been registered for 1 calendar month before the match"; a sign that Jardines had been recruiting players, probably by offering jobs at the factory to avoid the restrictions on professionalism. Jardines opposed the application on the basis that the appeal was made outside the 3 day limit for applications. However the Nottingham FA voted, by a majority of 3, to award the tie to the Collieries.

The following season, the club reached the third round of the tournament, where it played Nottingham Forest, at home. Notably, while Jardines were at full strength, Forest fielded mostly reserves; already Forest and Notts County were eschewing the local competition in favour of more lucrative friendlies. Forest beat Jardines 3–2, one of the goals coming directly from a corner; Jardines had drawn level from two down but conceded a late winner.

=== 1886-87: controversy and withdrawal from the Nottingham FA ===
Jardines had ambitions for the 1886–87 season. One rival club (Notts Rangers) protested to the Nottingham FA about Jardines 'poaching' its players; Rangers accused Jardines of offering three its players (including Alfred Shelton) inducements to play for Jardines in a friendly at Burnley, claimed that Jardines "have already several of our players through giving them situations", and one player (Arthur Elliott) had been offered a job at Jardines only after he had been proven to be a good footballer.

Certainly the recruitment seemed to be working as the club claimed some high-profile friendly wins; beating both Small Heath Alliance and Gainsborough Trinity, and drawing with Newton Heath.

The acid test would come in the Notts Senior Cup. In the first round, Jardines beat Mellors 3–2 away from home, before a "moderate" number of spectators. In the second round, the club was drawn away to Notts County; County therefore had the responsibility for arranging the date and venue. After bad weather had caused two postponements, and after three months of trying to tie down a date, the Nottinghamshire FA stated that the tie had to take place on 22 January 1887, at County's Trent Bridge, kicking off at 1.15pm. County had arranged a friendly against West Bromwich Albion for that date but due to kick off at 2.45pm. That would allow both matches to take place.

Jardines duly turned up at 1.15pm, but found no opposition present. County did turn out 90 minutes later, for the friendly, which was a 3–1 victory for the home side, in front of a crowd of 4,000. Jardines therefore claimed the tie, and the media agreed that County seemed to have scratched.

Perhaps with an eye to the crowd draw that County and Forest were, even with reserve sides, the Notts FA did not accept the Jardines claim, and at a later meeting County offered a different date for the tie. Jardines protested that County had had weeks in which to arrange the match, and noted that County had insulted Jardines by advertising the Notts 2nd side as the main attraction, whereas County had fielded the first XI against Basford Rovers in the FA Cup, despite the latter side being far below Jardines' standard. Jardines stated that:

under any circumstances we shall not play Notts in this competition. If the association should be so ill-advised as to stultify its own decisions, we shall protest against such degrading conduct by withdrawing from the competition.

Nevertheless, the Notts FA ordered the match to take place on 10 February 1887.

Jardines carried out its threat and refused to turn up for the re-arranged match, on the basis it was appealing to the Football Association. The Notts FA arranged one more replay, stating that, if either side did not turn up, they would be expelled. On the relevant day (26 February), neither side turned up; County instead hosted Aston Villa and Jardines were playing Burnley. As County were put through to the semi-final, it appears Jardines had scratched from the tournament before the date.

Nevertheless, Jardines raised a petition, signed by 18 clubs (including Forest and Notts Rangers), that the Notts FA should re-open the issue. At the next Notts FA meeting, the vote was tied, and the chairman's casting vote was in favour of rejecting the petition.

What may have been the last straw for Jardines was that, two weeks later, the Notts FA censured the club for its poaching of players, and ordered Jardines to apologize. At the end of the season, Jardines withdrew from the Nottinghamshire FA.

=== FA Cup and search for a league ===
The problem with the club withdrawing from the Nottinghamshire FA was that, at the start of the year, it had filed its first entry to the FA Cup for 1887-88. Instead of facing the competition with the strong team it had at the start of the 1886–87 season, its stance regarding the Nottinghamshire FA had cost it several players, who looked elsewhere for competitive fixtures. Dick Danks left for Wolverhampton Wanderers, captain Robinson for Gainsborough Trinity, and two players signed for Notts Olympic. The denuded side was far short of its previous standard, losing 8–1 at Newton Heath, and only being able to field 10 men in the Gainsborough Cup competition against Derby Junction, the match ending in a 5–1 defeat.

The ultimate humiliation came in the club's only FA Cup tie in the main rounds. Jardines was drawn to visit Notts Rangers; the previous season, Jardines had been seen as the more attractive side to join, because of the higher wages and expenses on offer. Now, however, Rangers were able to arrange more fixtures with other local FA members, and therefore had more matches for players being paid by the game. Geary scored five for Rangers, at half-time Rangers were six goals to the good, and the game finished Notts Rangers 10, Jardines 1.

The club regrouped for 1888–89, with an entirely new set of players, and there was still some attraction for the club as opposition, as Birmingham St George's hosted a friendly with Jardines, for which there was prominent advertising; however Jardines were described as "weak in the extreme" as they lost 4–0. The club also lost in the first qualifying round of the Cup to Gainsborough Trinity.

In 1889–90, the club had a fresh start, with a new ground (Muskham Street) and a new league; the club was a founder member of the Nottingham League. Jardines also finally won in the FA Cup, beating Notts Swifts and Beeston St John's in the first two qualifying rounds, before losing at the third qualifying round stage in a replay at Gainsborough Trinity. One of the players in the Trinity side was Arthur Elliott, who had scored the Jardines goal the previous season.

However, despite, or maybe because of, this promising stat, the club withdrew from the Nottingham League after playing just 2 matches, claiming that the standard of the other clubs was not strong enough.

In 1890–91, the club was again a founder member of a new league, the Midland Alliance, with a wider cast of clubs. Other founders included Notts Olympic, Doncaster Rovers, Loughborough Town, and Sheffield F.C., plus the Notts County reserves (under the name Notts County Rovers). However this standard proved far too high for the club. It only won one match, against County Rovers, and even then it lost the 2 points from that win because of fielding an ineligible player. A 3–0 defeat to Loughborough was the last of the 9 matches the club played that season, and, indeed, was the last match the club played in its original incarnation, an FA suspension for non-payment of a fine being fatal.

=== Later incarnations ===
In 1893, a committee was formed to re-start the club. The club re-joined the Notts FA and, playing at the amateur level, was instantly successful; the club reached the final of the Nottinghamshire Junior Cup, holding opponents Stapleford to two draws - Stapleford being so confident of success in the replay at Lenton that a brass band had been arranged to greet the club on its return - before going down 3–0 in the second replay.

In 1896, this second incarnation joined the Notts Amateur Football League. However, after the parent company was affected by strike action, the club was disbanded a second time, in 1898.

The final incarnation was formed in 1901, and joined the Notts Alliance for amateur and works teams. The club was successful at this much lower level; in both 1902-03 and 1903-04 it won the League, and in the former season won the Junior Cup. In 1910 the club reached the last 16 of the FA Amateur Cup, its best result in a national competition.

However, the club was abandoned during World War 1, and an unsuccessful application in 1919 to join the Notts Football Alliance in 1919 was the last action of the club.

== Colours ==
The club colours for 1884-85 described as red and black, probably referring to the shirts and shorts rather than a pattern. From 1885 they were described simply as red. Given Ernest Jardine's links with Nottingham Forest, it is possible he obtained shirts from them.

== Grounds ==
The club's matches were originally on the Forest recreation ground. As a works side, there was less need to charge spectators admission, as the club was not likely to generate much external support; the club used the Navigation Inn as its headquarters. In 1889 the club moved to Muskham Street, which was the former ground of the Nottingham Scottish team.

== Notable players ==
- Albert Iremonger, played for the side in 1902–03
- George Toone, future England international, played for the side in 1885
- George Robinson, won the FA Cup with Bradford City in 1911
