= John Irving (footballer, born 1867) =

Scottish footballer

Personal information
- Date of birth: 1867
- Place of birth: Dumfries, Scotland
- Date of death: 20 November 1942 (aged 75)
- Place of death: Nottingham, England
- Position: Inside right

Senior career*
Years	Team	Apps	(Gls)
1887–1889	Queen of the South Wanderers		
1889–1895	Lincoln City^{[A]}	44	(9)
1895–1896	Newark Town		
1896–1897	Lincoln City	7	(1)
- * Club domestic league appearances and goals

John Irving (1867 – 20 November 1942), also known as Johnnie or Johnny Irving, was a Scottish professional footballer who scored 10 goals from 51 appearances in the Football League in the 1890s playing as an inside right for Lincoln City.

== Playing career ==
Irving was born in Dumfries in 1867. He played for home-town club Queen of the South Wanderers for two years before moving to England to join Lincoln City. He made his debut on 5 November 1889 in the Midland League, and played for the club until the 1894–95 season, their second in the Football League. In the 1890–91 season, Irving was the club's leading scorer, with 12 goals from Football Alliance and FA Cup games. He is believed to have been the first Lincoln player to be sent off in a Football League match: in November 1894, he and Grimsby Town's Tom Frith were dismissed for fighting.

After losing his first-team place, Irving moved on in February 1895 to Newark Town in the Midland League before returning to Lincoln City a few months later. His last game for their first team came in the Football League Second Division, a 3–0 defeat to Loughborough on 6 March 1897, and he retired as a player later that year. Over both spells with Lincoln, Irving scored 43 goals from 123 senior appearances.

== After playing ==
After finishing his playing career, Irving became Lincoln City's trainer, and served on their board of directors between 1897 and 1901. It was during this period that David Calderhead, who had been a team-mate of Irving's at Queen of the South Wanderers, joined Lincoln as manager. Irving's two sons also went on to become directors of the club. Irving then kept a pub in Lincoln until his retirement in 1930, when he moved to Nottingham with one of his sons, who had joined the board of Notts County F.C. Irving died in that city in 1942 aged 75.

== Notes ==
A.: Lincoln City appearances and goals are for Football League matches only, not those in the Midland League or Football Alliance.
