= Albert Godderidge =

English footballer

Personal information
- Full name: Albert Edward Godderidge
- Date of birth: 29 May 1902
- Place of birth: Tamworth, England
- Date of death: 1976 (aged 73–74)
- Position: Goalkeeper

Senior career*
Years	Team	Apps	(Gls)
1922–1923	Tamworth Twogates		
1923–1927	Leicester City	50	(0)
1927–1928	Barnsley	16	(0)
1929	Newark Town		
1930	Hinckley United		
1931	Nuneaton Town		
1932	Tamworth		
Total		66	(0)
- * Club domestic league appearances and goals

Albert Edward Godderidge (29 May 1902 – 1976) was an English footballer who played in the Football League for Barnsley and Leicester City.
