= Notts Swifts F.C. =

English former football club, based in Nottingham

Nottingham Swifts
- Full name: Nottingham Swifts Football Club
- Nicknames: the Swifts, the Blacks
- Founded: 1876?
- Dissolved: 1892; 134 years ago
- Ground: Forest Recreation Ground
Home colours

Nottingham Swifts Football Club, usually referred to as Notts Swifts, was an English football club, founded in or before 1876 under the name Mansfield Road. They became Notts Swifts in 1880.

== History ==
The earliest reference to a match played by the club is in 1876, losing to North Nottingham Youth.

The club was one of the ten founder members of the Nottinghamshire Football Association in 1882. Always in the shadow of other clubs in the town — not just Nottingham Forest and Notts County, but Notts Rangers, Notts Olympic and even works sides like Jardines — the club's best achievement was reaching the semi-finals of the Nottinghamshire Senior Cup in 1888–89. Despite losing to Notts Olympic in the last eight, the club was reinstated after the Olympics was disqualified for professionalism (following a protest by Basford Pioneers). The Swifts lost the semi-final to eventual winners Notts Rangers 3–2.

By 1887, the club was entering the Nottingham Junior Cup, without success; in 1887–88, it lost to Sneinton Rovers in the first round. Nevertheless, the same year, the club entered the FA Cup. Being drawn away at Nottingham Forest meant that many thought the tie a "foregone conclusion", but Swifts played above themselves and held Forest to a 1–1 draw after 90 minutes, thanks to a header by C.F. Daft, brother of England international Harry Daft, from a corner by Warburton. The game went to extra-time, and although the Swifts dominated the first period, Forest won after Swifts goalkeeper (and club captain) G. H. Whyatt was charged through the goal while holding the ball.

The introduction of the Football League and Football Alliance dealt a mortal blow to many of the Nottingham town sides which were not part of either set-up. The club joined the Notts League, but struggled. The club recruited players from Jardines and Basford Pioneers before the start of the 1888–89 season, but once the season was underway the Swifts lost "no fewer than five of their best men" and an 8–1 lost to Notts Olympic in the first round of the Senior Cup, despite taking the lead, appears to have removed any enthusiasm for the club; the last senior fixture reported for the club is an 8–1 defeat to Boston in 1891, and the club's last reported match was a second-round defeat in the Nottingham Junior Cup, to Keyworth in 1892.

== Successor club ==
From 1892 a club called Nottingham Forest Swifts appears in the Midland League. This is the Nottingham Forest reserve side rather than a continuation of the Swifts.

== Colours ==
The club played in black shirts.

== Ground ==
The club played on the Forest Recreation Ground.

== Notable players ==
- Horace Pike, scorer of Forest's first League goal
