= Joe Raby =

English footballer

Personal information
- Full name: William Raby
- Date of birth: 3 July 1873
- Place of birth: Heighington, Lincolnshire, England
- Date of death: 18 December 1954 (aged 81)
- Place of death: Gainsborough, England
- Position: Inside forward

Senior career*
Years	Team	Apps	(Gls)
–	St Catherine's (Lincoln)		
1892–1894	Lincoln City	23	(7)
1894–1897	Gainsborough Trinity	5	(1)
1897	Lincoln City	3	(0)
1897–1898	Gainsborough Trinity	11	(4)
1898–1899	Wellingborough		
1899–1900	Tottenham Hotspur		
1900–1902	Gainsborough Trinity	60	(20)
1902–1904	Stockport County	52	(12)
1904–1905	Doncaster Rovers	2	(0)
- * Club domestic league appearances and goals

William "Joe" Raby (3 July 1873 – 18 December 1954) was an English footballer who scored 44 goals from 156 appearances in the Football League playing for Lincoln City (in two spells), Gainsborough Trinity (in three spells), Stockport County and Doncaster Rovers. He played as an inside forward. He also played in the Midland League for Gainsborough and Wellingborough, and in the Southern League for Tottenham Hotspur.

== Life and career ==
Raby was born in Heighington, Lincolnshire, in 1873, the son of Charles Raby, a gardener, and his wife Catherine. He played local football in Lincoln before joining the city's professional club, Lincoln City. He made his first-team debut towards the end of the 1891–92 Football Alliance season, and was to play infrequently over Lincoln's first two seasons in the Football League. He moved on to Gainsborough Trinity, then playing in the Midland League. Raby was short of stature, and in the early part of his career was noted for his pace.

In 1895, Raby scored twice for Gainsborough to defeat his former club Lincoln City in the final of the Lincolnshire Challenge Cup. When he joined Gainsborough, Lincoln had retained his Football League registration, which caused problems when Gainsborough were elected to that league ahead of the 1896–97 season. Raby made it clear that he intended to stay with Gainsborough, and his transfer was approved in time for him to begin the season with that club. He made a brief return to Lincoln, before leaving Gainsborough for Midland League club Wellingborough in 1898.

Raby had scored for Wellingborough against Tottenham Hotspur in a United League match late in the 1898–99 season, and went on to sign for that club for the coming season. He made only five first-team appearances, three in the Southern Combination and two in the Southern League, without scoring, and signed on for his third spell with Gainsborough ahead of the 1900–01 Football League season. After two seasons, in which he scored at a rate of one goal every three games, Raby signed for Stockport County.

He scored Stockport's first goal at their new Edgeley Park ground in a 1–1 draw with former club Gainsborough Trinity in September 1902. After two seasons, Stockport were unsuccessful in their application for re-election to the league, and Raby left the club to finish his career at Doncaster Rovers.

Raby died in Gainsborough, Lincolnshire, in 1954 at the age of 81.
