= Mellors Limited F.C. =

English former football club, based in Nottingham

Mellors Limited
- Full name: Mellors Limited Football Club
- Founded: 1883; 143 years ago
- Dissolved: 1889; 137 years ago
- Ground: Arkwright Street, Nottingham
- Secretary: H. W. Hill
Home colours

Mellors Limited Football Club, also variously given as Mellors' or Mellor's Limited, was an English football club from Nottingham.

== History ==
Mellors was the works side of M. Mellor & Sons Limited, a lace manufacturing company founded by Moses Mellor, the inventor of the loop wheel for knitting machines.

The club was founded in 1883, and most of the club's players came from the St Mary's district of Nottingham.

The club joined the Nottinghamshire Football Association in 1884 and entered the Nottingham Association Challenge Cup. In the second round the club gained its biggest competitive victory, beating Bottesford 8–0.

=== National stage ===
The club first entered the FA Cup in 1885–86, losing 6–2 at Nottingham Forest. Until the end of the 1886 season, the club's matches were almost entirely against other Nottinghamshire sides, but from 1886-87 onwards the club looked for fixtures outside the region; in September 1896 the club lost 1–0 at Sunderland and over the season played at Middlesbrough, several Derby sides, Bootle, Hurst, and Burton Swifts. The visit to Lincoln City saw the team go down 13–0.

Mellors also entered the FA Cup a second time and lost 2–1 at Cleethorpes, having taken the lead in the second minute. The most notorious match in the season was the club's 3–2 defeat in the Notts Cup to fellow works side Jardines, in which Machin of Mellors and Robinson of Jardines were both ordered off for fighting, and continued scrapping for a minute afterwards, with the game being held up.

At the start of the 1887–88 season, the club changed its name to Notts Mellors, and had its only win in the main stages of the FA Cup. Drawn to play Notts Olympic, the clubs agreed to play the match at the Muskham Street ground of the Nottingham Scottish club. Mellors won 6–3, after an extra-time period following the teams being level at 3–3 after 90 minutes, but Olympic protested that the pitch was 13 yards too short to host an FA Cup tie. The protest was upheld and the match replayed at Olympic's Churchville ground and Mellors won again, 2–1. The club lost to Nottingham Forest in the second round.

The club also had its best run in the Notts Cup, reaching the semi-finals, but, in an age of legal professionalism, the top two clubs in the town were not taking the contest seriously and it had lost much of its lustre. Only 600 saw the club lose 3–1 to Notts Rangers at the Castle ground.

=== Nottingham Wanderers ===
For the 1888–89 season, the club changed its name again to Nottingham Wanderers, the original Wanderers club having been defunct for some years. This seems to have been an attempt to widen the club's appeal beyond the Mellors factory, especially as some of its better players had been tempted away for professional careers. The first match under the new name was to open Stockton's new ground in September 1888 and a much-changed side won 2–0.

It was however a rare highlight. The revamped FA Cup saw the club put into the qualifiers, and, although it beat Basford Rovers in the second qualifying round 1–0 after a 20 minute extra time period (having had a bye in the first), the club lost 5–0 at Staveley in the third.

=== Decline ===
The club continued playing until the end of the 1888–89 season, the final recorded fixture for the club being at Heanor Town in April 1889, but it did not emerge for the 1889–90 season.

=== Re-use of the Wanderers name ===
A club called Nottingham Trent Wanderers, playing at Muskham Street, started up in 1889, which may have been an attempt to revive some of the support of the long-defunct Trent club, or to avoid confusion with the moribund Wanderers; a Notts Wanderers joined the Notts League for its second season in 1890–91, this club was described as a "new organisation" which had played the previous winter, so seems to have been Trent Wanderers with a shortened name.

This incarnation of the Wanderers was suspended after 9 matches (of which the club drew 2 and lost 7) for non-fulfilment of fixtures, and it was disqualified from the competition before playing again. The club merged with Notts St Johns by January 1891, and another Wanderers limped on to play for the first two seasons of the Notts Amateur League in 1894–95 and 1895–96, but, after only 4 wins in 34 fixtures, it did not emerge for the 1896–97 season.

== Colours ==
The club originally played claret and slate grey, changing to red and white in 1886.

== Ground ==
The club played at a field owned by Councillor Woodward, the firm's managing director, on Arkwright Street, where the firm's factory was situated.

== Notable players ==
- Frank Guttridge and Fred Weightman, future Notts County and Nottingham Forest players, played for the side in 1884–86.
- Arthur Hill, defender, left the side for Nottingham Forest in 1889.
