= A. Jackson (footballer) =

English footballer

Personal information
- Position: Full back

Senior career*
Years	Team	Apps	(Gls)
1892–1893	Lincoln City	2	(0)
- * Club domestic league appearances and goals

A. Jackson was an English professional footballer who played as a full back.

Jackson played 2 league matches for Lincoln City in their first season in the Football League, he also played in an FA Cup match against Newark
