= Grantham Town F.C. =

Association football club in Grantham, England

Coordinates: 52°54′21″N 0°39′53″W

Grantham Town
- Full name: Grantham Town Football Club
- Nickname: The Gingerbreads
- Founded: 1874
- Ground: South Kesteven Sports Stadium, Grantham
- Capacity: 3,960
- Chairman: Nick Johnston
- Manager: Mitch Griffiths
- League: Northern Premier League Division One Midlands
- 2025–26: United Counties League Premier Division North, 3rd of 20 (promoted via play-offs)
- Website: granthamtownfc.com
Home colours	Away colours

Grantham Town Football Club is a football club based in Grantham, Lincolnshire, England. They are currently members of the Northern Premier League Division One Midlands and play at the South Kesteven Sports Stadium.

== History ==
The club was established in 1874 as Grantham Football Club. They joined the Midland Alliance, but withdrew from the league during the 1892–93 season, and joined the Grantham & District League the following season. The club later returned to the Midland Amateur Alliance, where they played until becoming founder members of the Central Alliance in 1911 alongside Grantham Avenue. In 1924–25 the club were Central Alliance champions, also winning Division B of the Subsidiary Competition.

Grantham then moved up to the Midland League. In 1928–29 they reached the first round of the FA Cup for the first time since the Victorian era, and after beating Rhyl Athletic 1–0, lost 2–1 at Third Division North club Wigan Borough in the second round. In 1933 the club joined the new Central Combination, but after finishing second-from-bottom of the league in its first season, they returned to the Midland League. The club qualified for the first round again in 1935–36, losing 2–0 at home to Notts County. The 1937–38 season saw the club finish the season as Midland League runners-up.

In the 1945–46 FA Cup, the first after World War II, Grantham reached the second round again; after beating Kettering Town in the first round, they lost 4–2 on aggregate to Mansfield Town in the second round. Another first round appearance in 1947–48 resulted in a 2–1 defeat at Stockton, whilst the club's 1949–50 FA Cup run ended with a 4–1 loss at Wrexham. In 1959 the club left the Midland League to rejoin the Central Alliance and were placed in Division One South. However, after two seasons the club returned to the Midland League. In 1961–62 they reached the first round of the FA Cup again, this time losing 3–0 at Brierley Hill Alliance.

Grantham were Midland League champions in 1963–64 and runners-up the following season. In 1965–66 they beat Hendon 4–1 in the first round of the FA Cup before losing 6–1 at home to Swindon Town in the second round. The club also reached the second round the following season after beating Wimbledon 2–1 in the first round; in the second round they lost 4–0 at home to Oldham Athletic. After finishing as Midland League runners-up again in 1969–70, the club won back-to-back league titles in 1970–71 and 1971–72; the 1970–71 season also saw them beat Football League opposition in the FA Cup for the first time, defeating Stockport County 2–1 in the first round before losing 4–1 to Rotherham United in the second. After the second successive title in 1971–72, the club were promoted to Division One North of the Southern League, which they won at the first attempt, earning promotion to the Premier Division.

The following season saw Grantham progress to the third round of the FA Cup for the first time since the 1880s. After beating Hillingdon Borough 4–0 in the first round, they went on to defeat Third Division Rochdale 5–3 in a second round replay, before losing 2–0 at home to Second Division Middlesbrough in the third round in front of a record crowd of 6,578. They went on to finish the league season as runners-up in the Premier Division. However, in 1977–78 the club finished bottom of the Southern League Premier Division and were relegated to Division One North. The following season saw them win the division. As well as being promoted, the club were also transferred to the Northern Premier League. However, after being relegated at the end of the 1984–85 season, they were transferred back to the Southern League and placed in the Midland Division.

In 1987 the club was renamed Grantham Town. They were Midland Division champions in 1997–98, earning promotion to the Premier Division. The club were relegated again at the end of the 1999–2000 season, this time of the Eastern Division. After finishing as runners-up in the Eastern Division in 2001–02 the club were promoted back to the Premier Division. In 2006 they were transferred to the Premier Division of the Northern Premier League, but were relegated to Division One South at the end of the 2007–08 season. In 2010–11 a fifth-place finish saw them qualify for the promotion play-offs, in which the club beat Newcastle Town 3–0 in the semi-finals before losing 2–0 to Rushall Olympic in the final. However, they won Division One South the following season and were promoted back to the Premier Division. In 2017–18 the club finished fourth in the Premier Division, qualifying for the play-offs. After defeating Warrington Town 3–0 in the semi-finals, they were beaten 2–0 by Ashton United in the final. They finished bottom of the Premier Division in 2021–22 and were relegated to Division One East. The club were transferred to Division One Midlands at the end of the 2023–24 season. In 2024–25 they finished bottom of Division One Midlands and were relegated to the Premier Division North of the United Counties League.

The following season saw Grantham finish third in the Premier Division North. They subsequently defeated Belper United 3–2 in the play-off semi-finals and then beat Newark Town 2–0 in the final to secure promotion at the first attempt.

== Ground ==
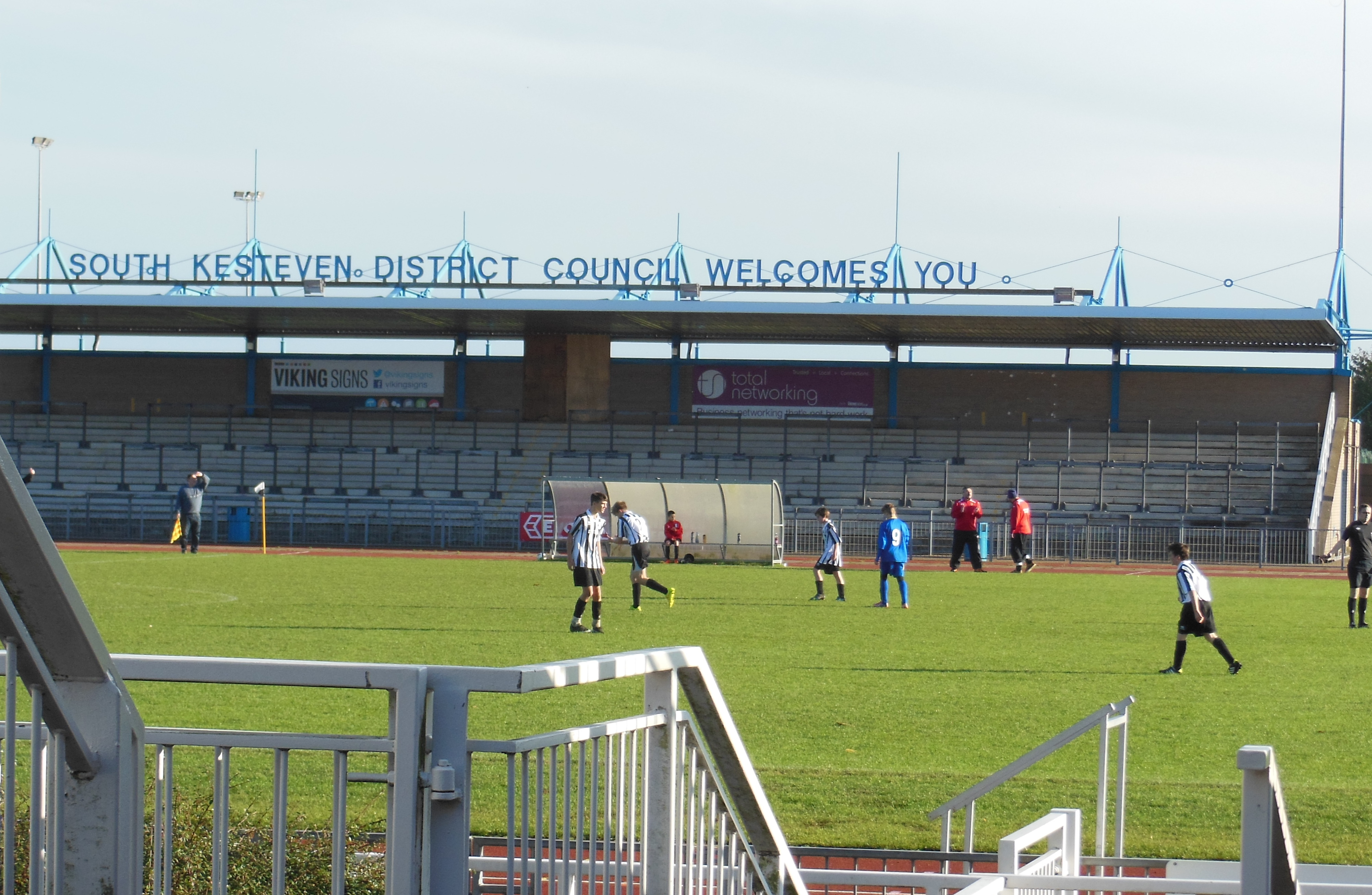
The East Stand at the South Kesteven Stadium

The club spent much of their history playing at London Road until leaving during the 1990–91 season. They briefly groundshared with Spalding United before moving to the council-owned South Kesteven Sports Stadium in August 1991, the opening game being a 5–1 defeat to Ilkeston Town. The ground was built on the Meres playing fields and is also referred to as 'the Meres'. On one side of the pitch is the seated West Stand, which has uncovered terracing on either side. The East Stand on the other side of the pitch is of a covered terrace. There are no stands behind the goals due to the running track. The ground currently has a capacity of 3,960.

== Honours ==
- Northern Premier League
  - Division One South champions 2011–12
- Southern League
  - Division One North champion 1972–73, 1978–79
  - Midland Division champions 1997–98
- Midland League
  - Champions 1963–64, 1970–71, 1971–72
  - League Cup winners 1968–69, 1970–71
- Central Alliance
  - Champions 1924–25
  - Division B champions 1924–25
- Midland Amateur League
  - Champions 1910–11
- Lincolnshire Senior Cup
  - Winners 1884–85, 1971–72, 1982–83
- Lincolnshire County Senior Cup
  - Winner 1936–37
- Lincolnshire Senior Cup 'A'
  - Winners 1953–54, 1960–61, 1961–62
- Lincolnshire County Shield
  - Winners 2003–04, 2004–05, 2011–12

== Records ==
- Best FA Cup performance: Third round, 1883–84, 1886–87, 1973–74
- Best FA Trophy performance: Quarter-finals, 1971–72, 1997–98
- Biggest victory: 13–0 vs Rufford Colliery, FA Cup preliminary round, 15 September 1934
- Heaviest defeat: 15–0 vs Notts County Rovers, Midland Amateur Alliance, 22 October 1892
- Record attendance: 6,578 vs Middlesbrough, FA Cup third round, 1973–74
- Most appearances: Adrian Speed, 667
- Most goals: Jack Macartney, 416
- Record transfer fee received: £20,000 from Nottingham Forest for Gary Crosby

== See also ==
- Grantham Town F.C. players
- Grantham Town F.C. managers
