= Charles Coulton =

English footballer

Personal information
- Full name: Charles Coulton
- Position: Right back

Senior career*
Years	Team	Apps	(Gls)
- Birmingham St George
1892–1893	Lincoln City	12	(0)
- * Club domestic league appearances and goals

Charles Coulton was an English professional footballer who played as a full back.

Coulton signed for Lincoln City after Birmingham St George disbanded, he played in the first 12 matches in the 1892–93 season before being dropped, he was a brother of Frank Coulton who played for Aston Villa.
