= Robert Cameron (Lincoln City footballer) =

Scottish footballer

Personal information
- Full name: Robert Cameron
- Position: Forward

Senior career*
| Years | Team | Apps | (Gls) |
| 1892–1893 | Lincoln City | 15 | (3) |
- * Club domestic league appearances and goals

Robert Cameron was a Scottish professional footballer who played as a forward.

Kelly was recruited from Glasgow and was paid £18 signing on fee. On 3 September 1892 while playing against Sheffield United he scored Lincoln City's first ever Football League goal, he only scored 2 more goals in his next 14 league matches and eventually replaced by fellow Scot Jock Fleming.
