= Tom Frith =

English footballer

Personal information
- Full name: Thomas Frith
- Date of birth: 1870
- Place of birth: Grimsby, England
- Date of death: March 1915 (aged 44–45)
- Position: Full-back

Senior career*
Years	Team	Apps	(Gls)
1885–1892	Humber Rovers		
1892–1899	Grimsby Town	125	(0)
- * Club domestic league appearances and goals

Thomas Frith (1870 – March 1915) was an English professional footballer who played as a full-back.
