= George Brammer =

English footballer

Personal information
- Full name: George Brammer
- Date of birth: 1873
- Place of birth: Lincoln
- Position: Left back

Senior career*
Years	Team	Apps	(Gls)
1892–1893	Lincoln City	2	(0)
- * Club domestic league appearances and goals

George Brammer was an English professional footballer who played as a full back.

Brammer made his first appearance for Lincoln City in 1890 when they were playing in the Midland League, in total he only played eight matches but only two in the Football League and they were on Good Friday and Easter Saturday in 1893.
