= Boston RFC =

Boston RFC may refer to:

- Boston RFC (England), a rugby union club from Boston, Lincolnshire
- Boston RFC (United States), a rugby union team based in Boston, Massachusetts
