= Nottingham Wanderers F.C. =

English former football club, based in Nottingham

Nottingham Wanderers
- Full name: Nottingham Wanderers Football Club
- Nickname: the Wanderers
- Founded: 1872
- Dissolved: 1886
- Ground: the Meadows, Queen's Walk
Home colours

Nottingham Wanderers F.C. was an English association football club from Nottinghamshire.

== History ==
Although the club claimed a formation date of 1872, the first recorded match is from 1876, against Radcliffe. It is possible that the foundation date refers to the cricket club out of which the football club was formed.

The club was one of the first to play under artificial lighting, a match with Nottingham Trent at the Castle ground in November 1879 being described as "lighted by means of Bengal lights". It was one of the first entrants to the Notts Cup in 1883-84, reaching the semi-finals, but losing to the Trent club. The Wanderers appealed the result on the basis that one of the Trent players (Harry Moore) was a professional with Notts County, and that both he and another player were cup-tied, but the Nottinghamshire Football Association rejected the appeal, as it was both out of time and unsupported by a formal motion by the Wanderers club.

The club struggled to attract crowds; although 1,000 attended a match against the Swifts at the Meadows in October 1884, one week later, the club played in front of a meagre attendance because most people were watching Notts County v Darwen instead.

=== FA Cup entries ===
The club only entered the FA Cup twice, both times losing in the first round. In 1884-85, losing 1-0 at Sheffield Heeley. The following year, the club lost in a replay to Notts Olympic. Even a local derby Cup tie could not attract crowds, only 400 turning up to the first match (the appalling weather being a factor).

=== End of the club ===
The last recorded result for the club is an 8-0 defeat at Accrington in December 1885 and in January 1886 the club is described as "quite defunct".

The Wanderers name was revived in 1888 as the new name for Mellors Limited F.C.

== Colours ==
The club colours were described as "scarlet" and "scarlet and white", probably referring to the shirts and knickerbockers rather than a pattern.
