= Mansfield F.C. =

Mansfield
- Full name: Mansfield
- Founded: 1885 (as Mansfield Town)
- Dissolved: 1896.
- Ground: Stanhope Street
- Secretary: George Ginn
- 1895–96 (last full season): Midland League, 13th
Home colours

Mansfield F.C. was an English football club based in Mansfield, Nottinghamshire.

== History ==
The club was formed as Mansfield Town in 1885 and joined the Midland League in 1892. In 1894 they absorbed Greenhalgh's FC and dropped Town from their name. They spent four years in the league before resigning because of financial difficulties. They folded soon after.

== Colours ==
The club originally wore red and black halved jerseys. From 1894 the club wore blue and black.

== Ground ==
The club played at Stanhope Street.
