= James Kelly (Lincoln City footballer) =

Scottish footballer

Personal information
- Full name: James Kelly
- Position: Inside left

Senior career*
| Years | Team | Apps | (Gls) |
| 1892–1893 | Lincoln City | 8 | (1) |
- * Club domestic league appearances and goals

James Kelly was a Scottish professional footballer who played as an inside left.

Kelly was recruited from Glasgow and was paid £22 signing on fee. He played the first eight league matches of the 1892-93 campaign scoring just once against Small Heath, he was considered as skillful but had a poor shot and was dropped.
