= Quentin Neill =

Scottish footballer

Personal information
- Full name: Quentin Durward Neill (Note: The Lincoln City FC Archive and Michael Joyce's Football League Players' Records list his name as Quentin Durward Neill, but the 1891 Census entry names him Quintin Dick Neill.)
- Date of birth: 16 April 1866
- Place of birth: Glasgow, Scotland
- Date of death: 9 August 1901 (aged 35)
- Place of death: Durban, South Africa
- Position: Right back

Senior career*
Years	Team	Apps	(Gls)
–	Queen's Park	0	(0)
1888–1895	Lincoln City	119	(2)
- * Club domestic league appearances and goals

Quentin Durward Neill (16 April 1866 – 9 August 1901) was a Scottish footballer who made 59 appearances in the Football League for Lincoln City. He played as a right back. Before moving to England he played for Queen's Park in Scotland.

== Life and career ==
Neill was born in Glasgow, he was younger brother to Robert W. Neill who went on to captain Scotland in 1880. He played football for Queen's Park before moving to England where he joined Lincoln City. He made his debut in December 1888 in the Combination, and played regularly over the next six years as the club won the Midland League title in its inaugural season, played in the Football Alliance, and was invited to join the newly formed Second Division of the Football League. He scored three goals, two in the Midland League and one in the FA Cup.

The 1891 Census records Neill working as an accountant and lodging in the St Botolph's parish of Lincoln, in the household of former Lincoln City footballer Jack Strawson, also an accountant.

Neill had a benefit match in 1895 against Burnley and by the end of the year he had emigrated to South Africa to set up business, and when the Boer War broke out he became a Trooper with the Driscoll's Scouts. Neill died in 1901, in a Durban hospital due to a fever.
