= Mick Richardson =

English footballer

Personal information
- Full name: John Mettham Richardson
- Date of birth: December 1872
- Place of birth: Lincoln, Lincolnshire, England
- Date of death: 10 July 1920 (age 47)
- Place of death: Lincoln, Lincolnshire
- Positions: Centre half; left half

Senior career*
Years	Team	Apps	(Gls)
–	St Catherines (Lincoln)		
1892–1896	Lincoln City	64	(6)
1896–1897	Gainsborough Trinity	8	(0)
–	Constitutional Club (Lincoln)		
- * Club domestic league appearances and goals

John Mettham Richardson (December 1872 – 10 July 1920) was an English footballer who made 72 appearances in the Football League playing for Lincoln City and Gainsborough Trinity. He played as a centre half or left half.

Richardson was the eldest child of Clark Richardson and Mary Ann (née Mettham), who married in February 1872. He married Lucy Brown in 1897. They had a daughter, Lottie Florence Richardson, in 1898. He later worked as a metal machinist before his death at age 47.
