= Isaac Moore (footballer, born 1867) =

Scottish footballer (1867–1954)

Personal information
- Full name: Isaac Moore
- Date of birth: 8 April 1867
- Place of birth: Dundee, Scotland
- Date of death: 10 September 1954 (aged 87)
- Positions: Left half; forward

Senior career*
Years	Team	Apps	(Gls)
–	Dundee Our Boys		
–	Lincoln City		
1889–1890	Aston Villa	5	(3)
1890	Newcastle West End		
1890–1893	Lincoln City^{[A]}	22	(3)
1894–1895	Burton Wanderers	10	(3)
1895–1896	Swindon Town	11	(1)
- * Club domestic league appearances and goals

Isaac Moore (8 April 1867 – 10 September 1954) was a Scottish professional footballer who scored 9 goals from 38 appearances in the Football League playing as a left half or forward for Aston Villa, Lincoln City and Burton Wanderers.

Moore was born in Dundee in 1867. He made his debut in the Football League for Aston Villa in the 1889–90 season, scoring three goals from six appearances in all competitions. He spent three seasons with Lincoln City, playing regularly in the Midland League – he was the club's leading scorer in the 1890–91 season, with 16 goals in League and FA Cup – and the Football Alliance before being an ever-present in Lincoln's first season in the newly formed Football League Second Division. He then played in the Football League for Burton Wanderers before joining Southern League club Swindon Town for whom he made eleven league appearances, scoring once.

Moore died in 1954 at the age of 87. His grandson, Thomas Moore, also played with Villa.

== Notes ==
A.: Football League appearances and goals only, not Midland League or Football Alliance.
