= Boston F.C. (1878) =

Boston
- Full name: Boston Football Club
- Founded: 1878
- Dissolved: 1892
- Ground: Lord Nelson ground
- Secretary: C. F. Anderson
Home colours

Boston F.C. was an English association football club from Lincolnshire.

== History ==
The club claimed a foundation date in 1878 and first entered the FA Cup in 1887–88, losing 7–0 in the first round to Gainsborough Trinity. The tie was one of the first in which a substitute was used, Trinity's right-winger Williamson broke his arm after about ten minutes, with the score goalless, and Boston captain Shannon proposing that Trinity bring in a replacement; one of the reserves, Watkin, came on in place of Williamson.

The club continued to enter the qualifying rounds, but, although it could beat other amateur sides, it lost 9–0 to Lincoln City and 10–0 to Grimsby Town in 1890-91 and 1891–92. Its best run in the local competition was reaching the semi-finals in 1890–91, losing 3–2 to Grantham Town.

In 1887, the club had a new stand built, but, given the rise in professionalism in the game, the debts caused the club financial difficulties, which in 1889 saw the club committee resign after members voted against the club secretary. In early 1892 the club was "broken up".

A new Boston club, Boston Town, was founded in 1894, and it in turn was replaced by Boston United on its insolvency.

== Colours ==
The club played in gold and black.

== Ground ==
The club originally played at Mrs Oldrid's Park, and by 1888 had moved to the Lord Nelson Ground on Liquorpond Lane.

== Notable players ==
- Ambrose Langley, later Sheffield Wednesday
- William Gresham, later Lincoln City
