= Frank Smallman =

English footballer

Personal information
- Full name: Francis Joseph Bruce Smallman
- Date of birth: 1869
- Place of birth: Willingham by Stow, England
- Date of death: 1941 (aged 72)
- Place of death: Lincoln, England
- Position: Outside right

Senior career*
Years	Team	Apps	(Gls)
–	St John's (Lincoln)		
1889–1895	Lincoln City	22	(17)
1895–1896	Burton Wanderers		
1896–1897	Lincoln City	36	(6)
- * Club domestic league appearances and goals

Francis Joseph Bruce Smallman (1869–1941) was an English professional footballer who scored 23 goals from 58 appearances in the Football League playing as an outside right for Lincoln City.

== Football career ==
Smallman was born in Willingham by Stow, Lincolnshire, in 1869. He made his debut for Lincoln City on 7 September 1889 in the Midland League, and was the club's leading scorer for that season with 17 goals in senior competitions. Smallman played for the club until the end of the 1892–93 season, their first in the Football League. He was ever-present during that season, and was the club's leading scorer with 19 goals in senior competitions, 17 in the League. He spent the 1893–94 season with Burton Wanderers in the Midland League before returning to Lincoln City for two more years. Smallman's last game for their first team came in the Football League Second Division, a 4–1 defeat to former club Burton Wanderers on 4 April 1896. Over both spells with Lincoln, he scored 53 goals from 120 senior appearances. Smallman died in Lincoln in 1941 at the age of 72.
