= John O'Gaunts =

Football ground in Lincoln, England

- Interactive map of John O'Gaunts
- Location: Lincoln, England
- Coordinates: 53.2215°N 0.5422°W
- Surface: Grass

Tenant
- Lincoln City (1884–1895)

John O'Gaunts was a football ground in Lincoln in England. It was the home ground of Lincoln City from 1884 until 1895.

== History ==
Located to the south of Lincoln city centre, the John O'Gaunts ground had no spectator facilities and only a dressing room for the players. It took its name from John of Gaunt, 1st Duke of Lancaster, who owned land in Lincoln.

Lincoln City were elected to the Second Division of the Football League in 1892, with the first Football League game played at the ground on 1 October 1892 as Lincoln beat Sheffield United 1–0 in front of 2,000 spectators. The highest League attendance at the ground was set on 23 March 1894 when 7,500 watched Lincoln lose 2–0 to Notts County.

At the end of the 1894–95 season the club moved to Sincil Bank, around 300 metres to the south-east. The final League match at John O'Gaunts was played on 13 April 1895, with Lincoln beating Crewe Alexandra 5–2. The ground was later used for housing, and is now the site of Sibthorp Street.
