= Spilsby Town F.C. =

Association football club in England

Spilsby Town
- Full name: Spilsby Town Football Club
- Nickname: The Magpies
- Founded: 1881
- Ground: Ancaster Avenue Playing Field, Spilsby
- Manager: Eddie Rich & Roy Kelly
- League: Boston & District League Premier Division
- 2022-23: Boston & District League, 1st
Home colours

Spilsby Town F.C. is an English football club based in Spilsby, Lincolnshire. They play in the Boston & District League Premier Division, outside the English football league system.

== History ==
Formed as simply Spilsby, the club's foundation date is stated as 1881. However, the Charles W. Alcock football yearbooks record the club's foundation date as 1870, with the club originally playing at the cricket ground and wearing red and black jerseys and socks. The club entered the FA Cup for the first time in 1880-81 and lost 0–7 to Stafford Road of Wolverhampton. The match had to be played at Trent Bridge as Spilsby's ground was flooded; however, as Notts County were playing a prestigious friendly against Queen's Park at the Castle Ground at the same time, the attendance was about a dozen.

The club continued to compete in the FA Cup until 1884, but failed to win a single game. The highest scoring game in Sheffield Wednesday's history came against Spilsby in 1882 when the Sheffielders won 12–2 in the First Round. They did however find success in the Lincolnshire Senior Cup, winning the first three competitions from 1882 to 1884.

Since the 1880s, the club has changed name to Spilsby Town and featured in more local competitions, winning the Boston & District League on numerous occasions. The club did enter the Lincolnshire Football League during the 1990s, but left halfway through the 1995–96 season, and rejoined the Boston league.

In 2011 the club played a match against a team from Staveley to commemorate what was thought to be their first ever game in the FA Cup. The 2018–19 season saw the club win the Boston Premier League title.

== Ground ==
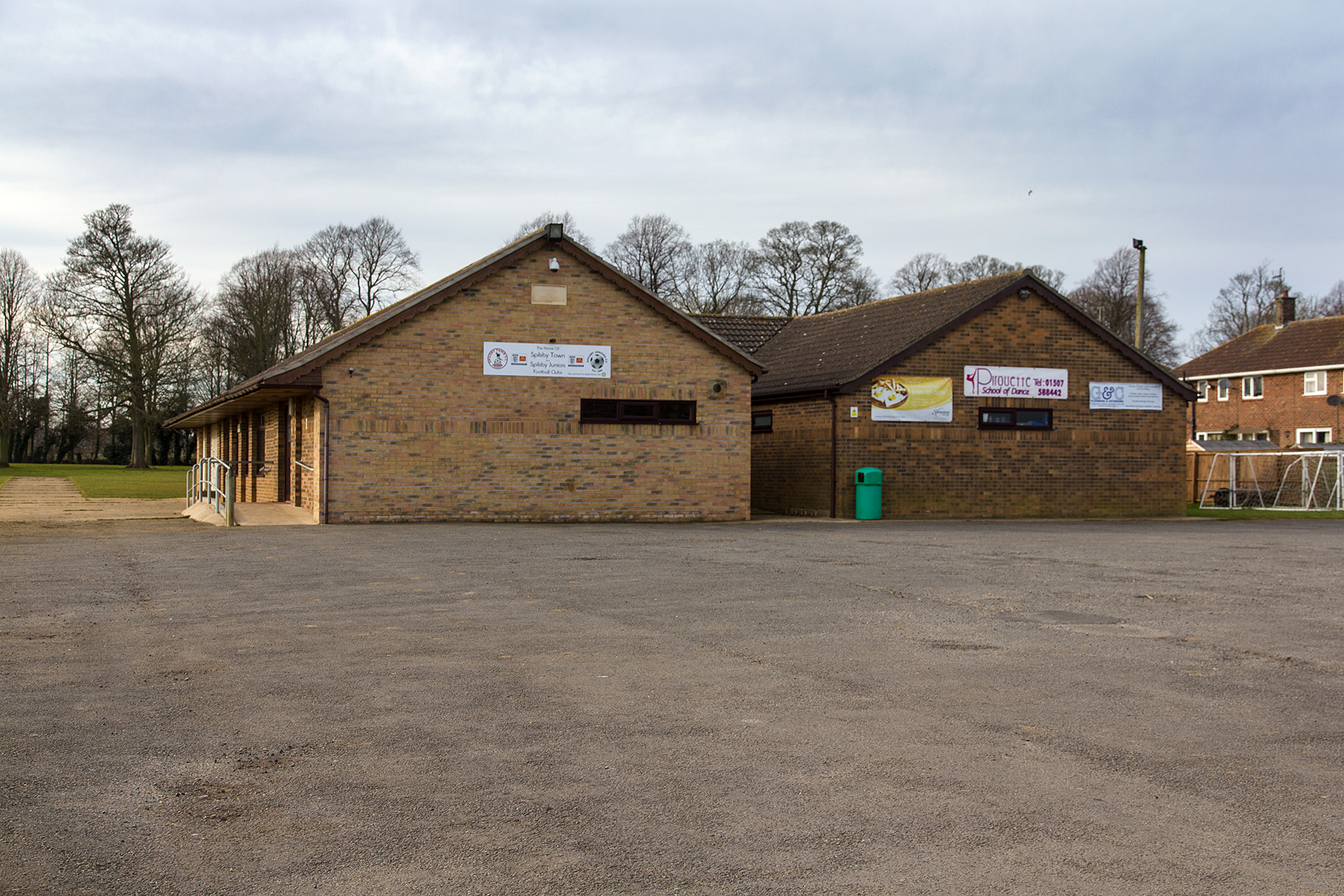
Spilsby Town FC

The club play their home games at the Ancaster Avenue Playing Fields.

== Honours ==
- Boston & District League
  - Premier Division Champions (4) 1947–48, 1963–64, 2001–02, 2018–19, 2022–23
  - Division One Champions (1) 1962–63
  - Sports Cup Winners (6) 1961–62, 1963–64, 1969–70, 1999–00, 2002–03, 2018–19, 2022–23
  - The Willoughby Cup Winners (5) 1953–54, 1989–90, 2001–02, 2011–12, 2015–16, 2022–23
- Lincolnshire Senior Cup
  - Winners (3) 1881–82, 1882–83, 1883–84

== Records ==
- Best FA Cup performance: 1st round
