= Notts Olympic F.C. =

English former football club, based in Nottingham

Notts Olympic
- Full name: Notts Olympic Football Club
- Nickname: the Olympians
- Founded: 1876; 1. Reestablished 1948; 2. Reestablished 2023
- Dissolved: 1916; 1959
- Ground: Selhurst Street, Radford
- Chairman: Dan Suns
1884–90 colours	from 1891 colours

Notts Olympic Football Club is an English football club from the Radford district of Nottingham.

== History ==
Notts Olympic was founded as Radford Excelsior, in the early 1870s, with matches reported from 1876.

The club claimed a foundation date of 1884, even though there are reports of the club playing under the Notts Olympic name from 1882; the later foundation date marked when the club moved to the Churchfields ground and entered the FA Cup for the first time. They currently compete in the Nottinghamshire Football League Premier division.

=== FA Cup main rounds ===
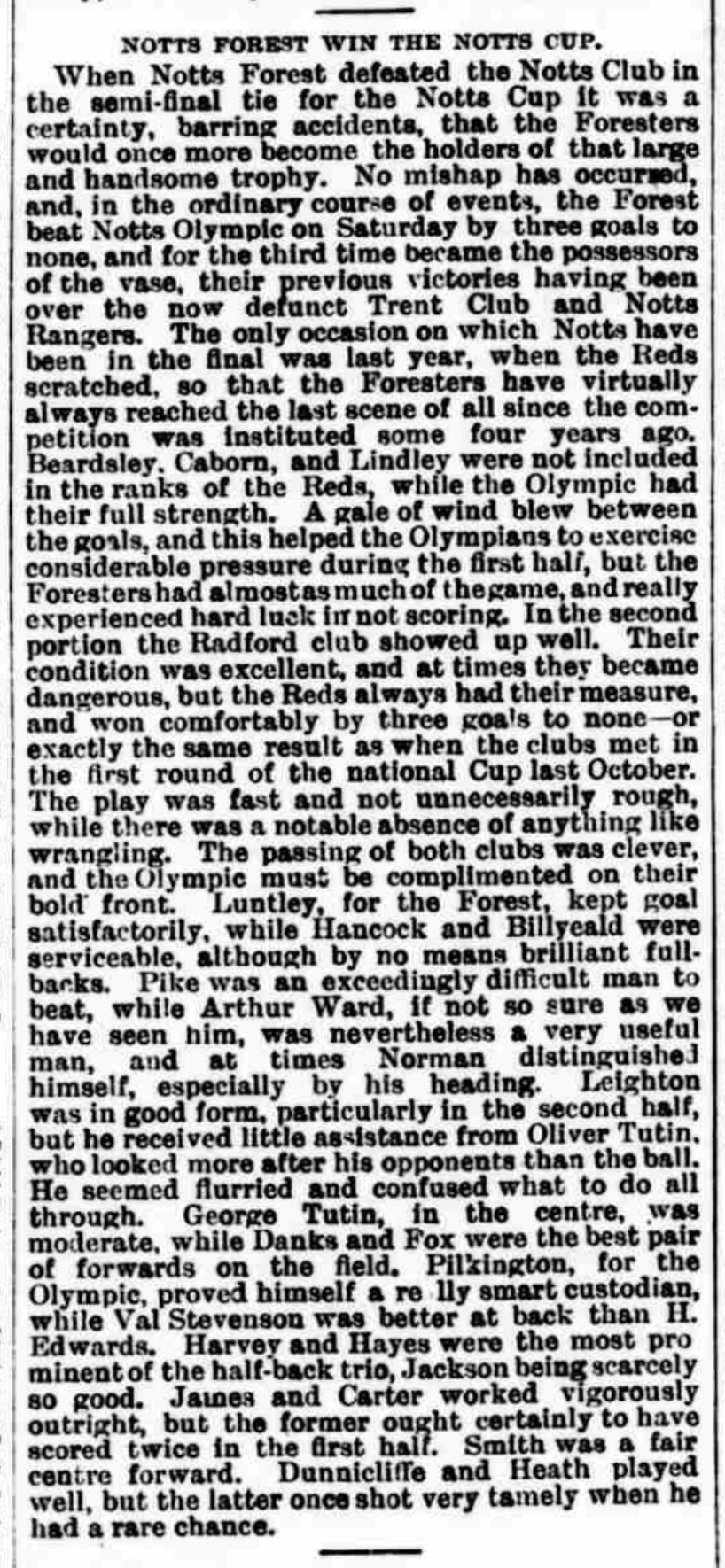
1886–87 Nottinghamshire Senior Cup Final, Nottingham Forest 3–0 Notts Olympic, Athletic News, 26 April 1887

The club was "not disgraced" by its first FA Cup match in 1884–85, only losing 2–0 to Notts County in the first round; however Olympic did not manage a shot on target all match, or earn any corners, while County had 11 of the latter.

The following year, the club beat Nottingham Wanderers 4–1 in a replay at the Churchville ground, which proved to be the club's only win in the main draw. In the next round, the club lost at Nottingham Forest by the same score, with the Olympians' play being described as "rough" and exhibiting "bad temper". Forest repeated the result in 1886–87, and in 1887–88 the club were drawn to play Mellors Limited F.C. away from home. After a 6–3 defeat, the Olympians protested that the Muskham Street ground was too small; on measuring it was found to be 13 yards too short, so the Football Association ordered a replay at Churchville. It was to no avail as Mellors won the replayed match 2–1.

=== Minor success in local competitions ===
The club twice reached the final of the Nottinghamshire Senior Cup. The first time, in 1887, Olympic lost 3–0 to Nottingham Forest on the latter's Gregory Ground; Forest fielded three reserves, and in later years both Forest and County only entered reserve XIs.

The second occasion was in 1893, the final against holders Mansfield Greenhalgh's being played off on a neutral ground at Hucknall. The Olympians were particularly cursed with injuries, not being able to field their captain, half-back Mounteney being a passenger in the second half after being injured just before half-time, and forward Newton having to retire hurt in the second half. Nonetheless, the Olympians turned around at half-time one goal ahead, but, after "a rough-and-tumble game, in which strength beat science", Greenhalgh's came from behind to win 2–1. Two months later the club played in the Newark Cup final, but suffered an 8–1 hammering against Grantham Rovers.

The club also entered the Birmingham Senior Cup in the late 1880s, reaching the third round (last 16) in 1887–88 (having beaten Burton Swifts 4–0) and the same stage - now titled the first round proper - in 1888–89, losing 6–4 at home to Walsall Town Swifts.

=== Qualifying round failures ===
The club continued to enter the FA Cup after qualifying rounds were introduced, but never got beyond the first match, the nadir being a 13–0 defeat to Leicester Fosse in 1894–95 - the Olympic had been drawn at home, but switched the tie to Leicester. Its last entry was in 1896–97, the club bowing out of senior football with an 8–0 defeat at Rushden, in front of 800 spectators.

=== Minor league football ===
As the club remained amateur, it became a founder member of the Midland Alliance in 1891, although the league only lasted two more seasons. The club therefore joined the Notts Amateur League, resigning before the end of the 1899–1900 season as the club was unable to fulfil its fixtures; in part this was due to the club's amateur status ensuring that it could not retain its better players. The club however joined the Notts Alliance and in 1906 a new incarnation of the Notts League.

The club continued to play in minor leagues until the First World War, finishing bottom but one in the Notts Alliance in 1913–14, when it avoided last place only thanks to a points deduction for another club. The final fixture for the club is recorded in April 1915, at Churchfield Lane, against Netherfield Rangers; in May 1916 the club was described as defunct.

== Colours ==
The club originally played in white, changing to dark and light blue halves for the 1884–85 season. In 1890 the club changed to red and green. By February 1891 the club had changed to black and red stripes, which also became the colours of AC Milan, as Olympian Herbert Kilpin took a set of shirts with him when sent to Milan for business.

== Grounds ==
The club's home matches were originally played "on the Forest" [recreation ground] before moving to Churchfields Lane in 1884, the ground itself often called Churchville. In 1892, the club moved to the Gregory Ground, recently vacated by Nottingham Forest. The move did not last long as in 1894 the club moved back to its "peculiar" old ground at Churchville. They Currently play their home games at Selhurst Street, which is the home of Radford FC.

== Notable players ==
- Herbert Kilpin, founder of AC Milan, played for the club in 1890 and 1891.

== Revival of name ==
The name has been revived on occasion over the years, the longest-running reincarnation being in existence from 1948 to 1959. The most recent reincarnation was set up in 2023.

== Honours ==
- Nottinghamshire Senior Cup:
  - Runners-up: 1886–87, 1892–93
