= William Gresham (footballer) =

English footballer (born 1870)

Personal information
- Date of birth: 1870
- Place of birth: Liverpool, England
- Date of death: after 1894
- Position: Goalkeeper

Senior career*
Years	Team	Apps	(Gls)
–	Gainsborough Trinity		
1892–1894	Lincoln City	35	(0)
- * Club domestic league appearances and goals

William Gresham (1870 – after 1894) was an English footballer who made 35 appearances in the Football League playing for Lincoln City as a goalkeeper. He played for Gainsborough Trinity before joining Lincoln in 1892 in time to play in their first Football League match, alongside his younger brother, James. Both brothers were ever-present in the 1892–93 Football League season.
