= Newark F.C. =

Defunct association football club in England

Newark Football Club
- Full name: Newark Football Club
- Nicknames: the Trentsiders, the Magpies
- Founded: 1868
- Dissolved: 1914
- Ground: Muskham Road
Home colours

Newark F.C. was a football club from the town of Newark-on-Trent, Nottinghamshire. It was one of the first clubs to play association football.

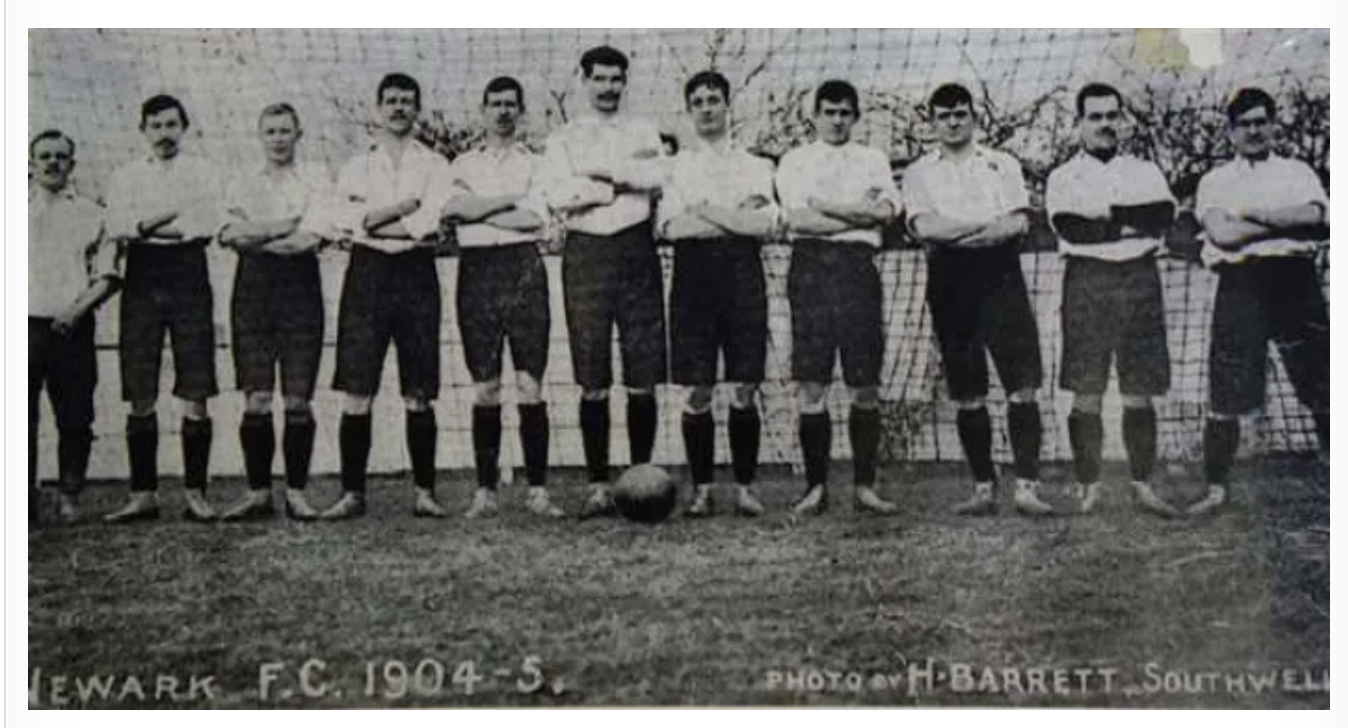
Newark F.C., 1904–5 season.

== History ==
The club was formed in 1868, and its first activity was a match between eleven of the club members on 31 October 1868, under association rules, at the Grove Ground on the London Road.

Its first match against an external side took place in January 1869, under the rugby football code, against Nottingham Forest. Newark had the advantage of Forest not knowing the rugby rules, but the match ended in a draw. For the next season, the club adopted the association code, and its first recorded match under the FA laws was a 3–0 defeat to Notts County in November 1869, the heavier Newark side unable to cope with the speed of the County players; also not helped by Newark playing with 10 men against 12. The club's experimentation with codes continued in December 1869, the club losing to Sheffield F.C. in a match played "to no particular rules", the Sheffield club not requiring strict adherence to the Sheffield code.

The club first entered the FA Cup in 1884–85, beating Spilsby F.C. in the first round (coming from 3–0 down to win 7–3), and losing at Middlesbrough in the second. As the Newark shirts of chocolate and cherry were similar to the Boro shirts of green and cardinal halves, the latter's players tied white handkerchiefs around their arms to aid distinguishing. The following season was the club's second and last entry into the main draw, ending in the first round with a defeat at home to Sheffield F.C. in front of a crowd of just 100, reduced by appalling weather.

The club had not turned professional as the rest of the game did, and played in the Midland League from 1892 to 1896, and 1899 to 1909. The club's best League seasons were in 1903-04 and 1904–05, when the club finished third. By 1909 though the club was struggling, and at the end of the 1908–09 season the club withdrew from the League, an appeal for help from the public having received a poor response.

The club was defunct by 1914, with an overdraft of £78, and with the club's bank suing the guarantors for reimbursement. The role of the town club was taken up by Newark Town F.C. in the 1920s.

== Colours ==
The club's original colours were white shirts and red knickerbockers, with blue and red caps. The club retained the red, white, and blue colours until at least 1875. By 1885, the club had changed to chocolate and cherry, probably in halves, and had changed to white shirts with black knickers by 1892; that season the Midland League forced the club to adopt different shirts (the club choosing black and white halves) to avoid clashing with Leicester Fosse. In the 20th century, the club usually wore white shirts and black shorts.

== Ground ==
The club originally played at the Grove Ground; in 1870 the club moved to Hunt's Field on Balderton Road, and in 1875 to the Newark Cricket Ground on Kelham Road. By 1889 Newark was playing at Muskham Road, using the facilities of the Midland Hotel.
