= Greenhalgh's F.C. =

Greenhalgh's
- Full name: Greenhalgh's Football Club
- Nickname: Halghs
- Founded: 1870
- Dissolved: 1894
- Ground: Field Mill
- Secretary: E. H. Greenhalgh, A. O. Scroft
Home colours

Greenhalgh's Football Club was a 19th-century English football club based in Mansfield, Nottinghamshire.

== History ==
The club was founded by E. H. Greenhalgh, a former Notts County back, in the 1870s; the club claimed a foundation date of 1870, which may have been when the workers at Greenhalgh's factory started playing football, and vice-chairman W. Day in 1892 claimed to have been a member for over 40 years. Certainly the factory's first athletic event took place in 1873 and a Greenhalgh's football club was playing other sides under Sheffield rules by 1874.

The club was originally formally called Greenhalgh & Sons, and in the 1890s Greenhalghs Incorporated, but was usually known as Greenhalgh's.

The club was a member of the Midland League for the 1893–94 season, finishing 5th out of 11. On 7 May 1894 the club voted to amalgamate with Mansfield Town (not connected to the current club) to form Mansfield F.C., with both grounds initially being retained. The aftermath saw the club's committee being sued for the club's outstanding debts, for which all committee members were held liable.

== Colours ==
The club wore amber and blue jerseys, which it sold to Mansfield Wesleyan on its dissolution.

== Ground ==
The club played at a pitch on the New Cricket Ground at Field Mill, which had been the site of Greenhalgh's factory since at least 1846.
