= Lincolnshire Senior Cup =

Football (soccer) competition

- Founded
- 1881
- Current Holders
- Boston United
- Country
- England
- County
- Lincolnshire
- Most Successful Clubs
- Lincoln City, Grimsby Town (38 Wins)

The Lincolnshire Senior County Cup is a football (soccer) competition for senior football clubs in Lincolnshire organised by the Lincolnshire FA.

The competition can be traced back to the formation of the Lincolnshire FA at a meeting held at the Queens Hotel in Lincoln on Saturday 17 September 1881 and sixteen teams entered the inaugural Lincolnshire Cup competition with Spilsby the first winners in 1881—82. Spilsby would go on to win the first three competitions and consequently they were allowed to retain the initial trophy.

When the competition first started it was treated as seriously as the FA Cup and the need for a Lincoln team to be successful in the competition following the initial victories by Spilsby, who defeated three Lincoln based teams – Lincoln Rovers, Lincoln Lindum and Lincoln Albion – in the 1883–84 competition, that led to the formation of Lincoln City on 26 June 1884.

The elevation of Grimsby Town and Lincoln City to the Football League in 1892 and Gainsborough Trinity in 1896 saw the importance of the competition decline over time and the format has undergone a number of changes over time as has the type of trophies offered by the Lincolnshire FA. In this entry attention is focused upon the most senior trophy offered by the Lincolnshire FA which currently has the official title of "The Lincolnshire Football Association Ltd Senior County Cup Competition" and is competed annually by the four senior clubs of the county: Boston United, Grimsby Town, Lincoln City and Scunthorpe United. The current holders are Scunthorpe United.

== The first competition, 1881–1934 ==
The final was not played in the 1887–88 season after finalists Grimsby Town resigned from the Lincolnshire FA.

Season	Winner	Runner-up
1881–82	Spilsby	Brigg Town
1882–83	Spilsby	Brigg Town
1883–84	Spilsby	Grimsby Town
1884–85	Grantham	Gainsborough Trinity
1885–86	Grimsby Town	Lincoln Lindum
1886–87	Lincoln City	Grimsby Town
1887–88	Final not played	
1888–89	Grimsby Town	Grantham Rovers
1889–90	Gainsborough Trinity	
1890–91	Lincoln City	Gainsborough Trinity
1891–92	Lincoln City	Gainsborough Trinity
1892–93	Gainsborough Trinity	Lincoln City
1893–94	Lincoln City	Gainsborough Trinity
1894–95	Gainsborough Trinity	Lincoln City
1895–96	Grimsby All Saints	Lincoln City Swifts
1896–97	Grimsby Town	Lincoln City
1897–98	Gainsborough Trinity	Adelaide (Lincoln)
1898–99	Grimsby Town	Gainsborough Trinity

Season	Winner	Runner-up
1899–1900	Grimsby Town	Adelaide (Lincoln)
1900–01	Grimsby Town	Lincoln City
1901–02	Grimsby Town	Gainsborough Trinity
1902–03	Grimsby Town	Lincoln City
1903–04	Gainsborough Trinity	Lincoln City
1904–05	Gainsborough Trinity	Grimsby Town
1905–06	Grimsby Town	Gainsborough Trinity
1906–07	Gainsborough Trinity	Grimsby Town
1907–08	Lincoln City	Gainsborough Trinity
1908–09	Grimsby Town	Lincoln City
1909–10	Lincoln City	Grimsby Town
1910–11	Gainsborough Trinity	Grimsby Town
1911–12	Lincoln City	Grimsby Town
1912–13	Grimsby Town	Lincoln City
1913–14	Lincoln City	Gainsborough Trinity
1914–15	Lincoln City	Grimsby Town

Season	Winner	Runner-up
1919–20	Lincoln City	Grimsby Town
1920–21	Grimsby Town	Lincoln City
1921–22	Lincoln City	Boston
1922–23	Grimsby Town	Lincoln City
1923–24	Lincoln City	Grimsby Town
1924–25	Grimsby Town	Boston
1925–26	Boston	Lincoln City
1926–27	Lincoln City	Boston
1927–28	Grimsby Town	Lincoln City
1928–29	Grimsby Town	Lincoln City
1929–30	Grimsby Town	Lincoln City
1930–31	Lincoln City	Grimsby Town
1931–32	Lincoln City	Grimsby Town
1932–33	Grimsby Town	Lincoln City
1933–34	Lincoln City	Grimsby Town

== The second competition, 1934–1949 ==
The increasing dominance of the county's two Football League sides Grimsby Town and Lincoln City saw the inauguration of the 'Lincolnshire Senior County Cup' which was played between the other Lincolnshire teams. The trophy was, by now, a minor consideration for the two clubs. For example, a crowd of just 2,334 gathered at Sincil Bank on 24 September 1934 to see Lincoln defeat Grimsby 5–0 compared to Lincoln's league average attendance of 5,227 for that season The competition was not held in either of the 1938–39 or 1939–40 seasons as the two clubs met in matches for the Football League Jubilee Fund, Lincoln coming out victorious in the first and Grimsby in the second. The senior non-league sides continued to play for the 'Lincolnshire County Senior Cup' (LCS) and this continued to attract strong interest for these sides with, for comparison, the 1934–35 final replay between Boston United and Grantham attracting an attendance of 5,500. The 'Lincolnshire County Junior Cup' continued for those clubs playing at a more junior non-league level.

Season	Winner	Runner-up	LCS Winner
1934–35	Lincoln City	Grimsby Town	Boston United
1935–36	Grimsby Town	Lincoln City	Boston United
1936–37	Grimsby Town	Lincoln City	Grantham
1937–38	Grimsby Town	Lincoln City	Boston United
1938–39	No competition		Scunthorpe and Lindsey United
1939–40	No competition		Scunthorpe and Lindsey United
1945–46	Lincoln City	Grimsby Town	Boston United
1946–47	Grimsby Town	Lincoln City	Gainsborough Trinity
1947–48	Lincoln City	Grimsby Town	Gainsborough Trinity
1948–49	Lincoln City	Grimsby Town	Gainsborough Trinity

The 1937/38 final between Grimsby Town and Lincoln City was played at Grimsby on 21 September 1937 in Grimsby with Grimsby Town winning 4–1. The 1948/49 final between Lincoln City and Grimsby Town was played at Lincoln on 14 May 1949 at Lincoln, with Lincoln City winning 2–1 after extra time.

== The third competition, 1949–1956 ==
The Lincolnshire Senior County Cup continued to be played as a straight final between the two Lincolnshire league teams, Grimsby Town and Lincoln City. Scunthorpe United's elevation to the Football League saw them eligible to participate in the competition from 1951 to 1952 onwards. One team received a bye to the final with the other two teams meeting in a semi-final. From season 1949–50 onwards the Lincolnshire County Senior Cup split into two sections 'A' and 'B' and was restricted to clubs nominated to compete.

Season	Winners	Result	Runner-up	Notes	Senior 'A' Winners	Senior 'B' Winners
1949–50	Grimsby Town	2–1	Lincoln City	13 May 1950	Boston United	Skegness Town
1950–51	Lincoln City	3–0	Grimsby Town	19 May 1951	Gainsborough Trinity	Spalding United
1951–52	Scunthorpe United	1–0	Lincoln City	10 May 1952	Gainsborough Trinity	Stamford
1952–53	Grimsby Town	1–0	Scunthorpe United	9 May 1953	Spalding United	Skegness Town
1953–54	Scunthorpe United	4–2	Grimsby Town	8 May 1954	Grantham	Stamford
1954–55	Scunthorpe United	5–3	Lincoln City	14 May 1955; After extra-time.	Boston United	Brigg Town
1955–56	Lincoln City; Scunthorpe United	1–1		12 May 1956. After extra-time. Trophy shared.	Boston United	Skegness Town

In 1949–50, the final between Grimsby Town and Lincoln City was played at Grimsby on 13 May 1950, with Grimsby winning 2–1.

In 1951–52, the semi-final was between Scunthorpe United and Grimsby Town, played at Scunthorpe on 31 March 1952, with Scunthorpe winning 1–0, the goal scored by Whitfield. Lincoln City had a bye into the final. The final was played at Scunthorpe on 10 May 1952, with Scunthorpe winning 1–0, through an own goal by Emery.

In 1952–53, the semi-final was between Lincoln City and Grimsby Town, played at Lincoln on 15 April 1953, with Grimsby Town winning 3–0 with goals by Lord and Maddison (2). Scunthorpe United had a bye into the final. The final was played at Grimsby on 9 May 1953, with Grimsby Town winning 1–0 with a goal by Hernon.

Scunthorpe United beat Lincoln City 2-1 in the 1953–54 semi-final, played at Scunthorpe. In the final, Scunthorpe United beat Grimsby Town 4–2.

In 1954–55, the semi-final was between Grimsby Town and Lincoln City at Grimsby on 19 October 1954, with an attendance of 3,918. Lincoln City won 2–0 with goals by Gibson and Finch. Scunthorpe United had a bye to the final. The 1954–55 final was played at Lincoln on 14 May 1955 with an attendance of 4,130. Scunthorpe United won 5–3, after extra time, with Scunthorpe United goals by Gregory (3), Brown and Whitfield. The Lincoln scorers were Garvie(2) and Munro.

The 1955–56 final was played at Scunthorpe United's ground on 12 May 1956. Score was 1–1.

== Four team knock-out, 1956–1962 ==
In 1956 the Lincolnshire Senior Cup competition was expanded to four clubs with the leading county non-league side, Boston United, invited to join the three league teams. In their first season in the competition they would defeat Grimsby Town in the semi-final before going on to lift the trophy with victory over Scunthorpe United in the final. Boston's demotion from the Southern Football League at the end of the 1960–61 season saw them replaced by Gainsborough Trinity for the 1961–62 competition.

Season	Winners	Result	Runner-up	Notes	Senior 'A' Winners	Senior 'B' Winners
1956–57	Boston United	3–1	Scunthorpe United	11 May 1957	Skegness Town	Brigg Town
1957–58	Scunthorpe United	3–2	Grimsby Town	5 May 1958	Gainsborough Trinity	Holbeach United
1958–59	Scunthorpe United	2–1	Lincoln City	8 December 1958	Gainsborough Trinity	Barton Town
1959–60	Boston United	2–1	Lincoln City	24 November 1959	Skegness Town	Grimsby Borough Police
1960–61	Scunthorpe United	4–0	Grimsby Town	6 March 1961	Grantham	Bourne Town
1961–62	Lincoln City	2–0	Scunthorpe United	19 March 1962	Grantham	Lincoln Ruston Bucyrus

In the 1956–57 season, Scunthorpe United beat Lincoln City at Scunthorpe on 1 October 1956 in the first semi-final with a goal by Jones, and Boston United beat Grimsby Town 2–0 in the second semi-final with goals by Bloomer (2), on 16 October 1956. The final was played at Scunthorpe United's ground on 11 May 1957, with Boston United beating Scunthorpe United 3–1. Sharpe scored for Scunthorpe United, and the Boston goals were from Clarke, Dunn and Bushby (o.g.).

The next season, 1957–58, saw Grimsby Town beat Boston United 3–0 in the first semi-final on 8 October 1957, and Scunthorpe United beat Lincoln City in the other semi-final on 19 March 1958, after a draw on 7 November 1957. In the final, Scunthorpe United beat Grimsby Town 3–2 on 5 May 1958.

In 1958–59, Lincoln City beat Boston United in the first semi-final on 29 September 1958 and Scunthorpe United beat Grimsby Town in the other semi-final on 9 October 1958. Scunthorpe United went on to beat Lincoln City in the final on 8 December 1958.

In 1959–60, Lincoln City beat Scunthorpe United in one semi-final and Boston United beat Grimsby Town 2–1 in the other semi-final played on 27 October 1959. Boston United went on to win the final, beating Lincoln City 2–1 on 24 November 1959.

Grimsby Town beat Lincoln City 8-3 in one of the 1960–61 semi-finals on 7 November 1960 and Scunthorpe United beat Boston United 3–1 in the other semi-final on 3 October 1960. In the final, Scunthorpe United beat Grimsby Town 4–0 on 6 March 1961.

Gainsborough Trinity's first appearance in the cup was a loss in the semi-final to Lincoln City in 1961–62. In the other semi-final, Scunthorpe United beat Grimsby Town on 17 October 1961. Lincoln City won the final, beating Scunthorpe United 2–0 on 19 March 1962.

== The doldrum years, 1962–1968 ==
This period was marked by a lack of interest in the trophy. The main competition was not held in either the 1962–63 season or the 1964–65 season. In two seasons of this period, the trophy was shared after the final failed to reach a conclusion. The Senior 'A' Cup was only played for once in this timeframe, Gainsborough Trinity defeating Boston United 2–1 in a replay on 15 April 1964.

Season	Winners	Result	Runner-up	Notes	Senior 'A' Winners	Senior 'B' Winners
1962–63	No competition.				No competition	Grimsby Borough Police
1963–64	Lincoln City; Scunthorpe United	1–1		30 April 1964. After extra-time. Trophy shared.	Gainsborough Trinity	Lincoln United
1964–65	No competition.				No competition	Barton Town
1965–66	Lincoln City; Scunthorpe United	2–2		24 May 1966; Trophy shared.	No competition.	Boston
1966–67	Lincoln City	3–0	Scunthorpe United	14 February 1967	No competition.	Brigg Town
1967–68	Grimsby Town	3–2	Lincoln City	26 March 1968	No competition.	Appleby Frodingham

In 1963–64, Scunthorpe United beat Grimsby Town in the first semi-final on 28 April 1964. In the final, held at Lincoln on 30 April 1964, the teams drew.

In 1965–66, Lincoln City reached the final after a 1–1 draw with Grimsby Town, at Lincoln, on 29 March 1966. Scunthorpe United received a bye to reach the final. The final, played at Scunthorpe on 24 May 1966 was a draw.

In 1966–67, Scunthorpe United beat Grimsby Town 3–2 at Grimsby on 7 November 1966 in the first semi-final. In the final played 14 February 1967 at Lincoln, Lincoln City beat Scunthorpe United.

In 1967–68, Lincoln City played Scunthorpe United in the first semi-final on 14 February 1968. Grimsby Town went on to win the cup.

== Six team knock-out, 1968–1976 ==
The Northern Premier League was founded in 1968 with Boston United and Gainsborough Trinity as founder members. At the same time they, along with Grantham, joined the three existing league clubs to form a six team knock-out competition played from the Quarter Final stage with two teams receiving a bye into the Semi Finals. The second tier of non-league sides competed for the Lincolnshire Senior 'A' Cup with the minor, mainly Lincolnshire league sides competing for the Lincolnshire Senior 'B' Cup.

Season	Winners	Result	Runner-up	Notes	Senior 'A' Winners	Senior 'B' Winners
1968–69	Lincoln City	4–1	Scunthorpe United	3 May 1969; After extra-time.	Skegness Town	Brigg Town
1969–70	Lincoln City	3–2	Boston United	4 May 1970	Skegness Town	Winterton Rangers
1970–71	Gainsborough Trinity	1–0	Grimsby Town	11 May 1971	Skegness Town	Lincoln United
1971–72	Grantham Town	2–0	Scunthorpe United	11 May 1972	Bourne Town	Louth United
1972–73	Grimsby Town	2–1	Boston United	1 May 1973	Lincoln United	Grimsby Amateurs
1973–74	Competition not completed.				Boston	Immingham Town
1974–75	Lincoln City	2–0	Grimsby Town	29 April 1975	Skegness Town	Lincoln Claytons
1975–76	Grimsby Town	1–0	Gainsborough Trinity	12 August 1975	Brigg Town	Ross Sports

In 1968–69, Grantham Town and Scunthorpe United drew the first quarter-final at Grantham on 23 October 1968. The replay was held in Scunthorpe on 10 May 1969, with Scunthorpe winning. The second quarter-final between Lincoln City and Grimsby Town needed three attempts to obtain a result, with Lincoln finally winning. The first semi-final was between Boston United and Scunthorpe United at Boston on 24 April 1969, ending in a 1–1 draw. Boston United then withdrew as they were not prepared to visit Scunthorpe after 2 May 1969, and as Scunthorpe had two Fourth Division games already arranged for the week prior, this could not be agreed. In the second semi-final, Lincoln City beat Gainsborough Trinity on 28 April 1969. In the final, Lincoln City beat Scunthorpe United on 3 May 1969 at Lincoln.

In 1969–70, Lincoln City reached the final by beating Grantham 5–1 away and Gainsborough Trinity 3–0 at home after a 3–3 draw away. Boston United reached the final by beating Scunthorpe United 5–3 in the semi-final at Scunthorpe. Lincoln City went on to win the final, played on 4 May 1970 at Boston.

== League versus non-League groups, 1976–1983 ==
For the competitions in the seasons between 1976–77 and 1982–83, the three league teams (Grimsby Town, Lincoln City and Scunthorpe United) were placed in one group with the three senior non-league teams (Boston United, Gainsborough Trinity and Grantham) in another. Each group member played the other members once with the two group winners meeting in the final.

Season	Winners	Result	Runner-up	Notes
1976–77	Boston United	3–1	Lincoln City	22 September 1976
1977–78	Scunthorpe United	3–1	Boston United	20 September 1977
1978–79	Boston United	2–0	Lincoln City	4 October 1978
1979–80	Grimsby Town	1–0	Gainsborough Trinity	16 October 1979; After extra-time.
1980–81	Lincoln City	3–0	Grantham Town	14 October 1980
1981–82	Lincoln City	1–1	Boston United	27 January 1982; Lincoln City won 3–1 Lincoln on penalties. After extra-time.
1982–83	Grantham Town	1–0	Scunthorpe United	26 October 1982

== Mixed formats, 1983–1986 ==
The 1983–84 competition was played as a straight knock-out between the six competing clubs, the league sides Grimsby Town, Lincoln City and Scunthorpe United and the three senior non-league sides Boston United, Gainsborough Trinity and Grantham. The 1984–85 and 1985–86 competitions reverted to a group format, with two randomly drawn groups of three with the winners progressing to the final.

Season	Winners	Result	Runner-up	Notes
1983–84	Grimsby Town	2–2	Gainsborough Trinity	14 May 1984; Grimsby won 5–3 on penalties.
1984–85	Lincoln City	1–0	Gainsborough Trinity	9 October 1984
1985–86	Boston United	4–0	Lincoln City	30 October 1985

== Straight knock-out, 1986–1996 ==
The competition was played as a straight knock-out. The three league sides Grimsby Town, Lincoln City and Scunthorpe United competed as did the three senior non-league sides Boston United, Gainsborough Trinity and Grantham Town (except 1992–93). Spalding United's seasons in the Southern Football League saw them compete in the competition from 1989 to 1991. The 1995–96 competition reverted to a group format, with two randomly chosen groups of three with the winners of each group progressing to the final.

Season	Winners	Result	Runner-up	Notes
1986–87	Grimsby Town	2–1	Scunthorpe United	11 November 1986
1987–88	Boston United	5–2	Gainsborough Trinity	25 November 1987
1988–89	Boston United	2–1	Gainsborough Trinity	8 November 1988
1989–90	Grimsby Town	2–0	Spalding United	1 May 1990
1990–91	Lincoln City	3–2	Grimsby Town	13 May 1991
1991–92	Grimsby Town	6–1	Boston United	16 October 1991
1992–93	Grimsby Town	1–0	Boston United	31 July 1993
1993–94	Grimsby Town	1–0	Boston United	23 November 1993
1994–95	Grimsby Town	5–3	Boston United	9 November 1994
1995–96	Grimsby Town	4–1	Boston United	6 December 1995

== Increasing numbers, 1996–2003 ==
Lincoln United's rise up the non-league pyramid saw them enter the competition in 1996–97 (they won the Lincolnshire Senior 'A' Cup in 1995–96). Scunthorpe United ended Grimsby Town's five-year reign as champions, defeating them 5–4 on penalties in the 1996–97 final. Lincoln City did not enter the 1999–2000 competition. Stamford promotion to the Southern Football League Eastern Division saw them eligible for the competition and their victory in the 2000–01 competition meant they became the first club to lift four types of Lincolnshire Cup: the Junior Cup (in 1948–49), Senior 'B' Cup (1951–52, 1953–54) and Senior 'A' Cup (1978–79, 1982–83, 1997–98).

Season	Winners	Result	Runner-up	Notes
1996–97	Scunthorpe United	3–3	Grimsby Town	10 December 1996; Scunthorpe United won 5–4 on penalties.
1997–98	Lincoln City	2–0	Lincoln United	27 January 1998
1998–99	Scunthorpe United	2–0	Stamford	17 November 1998
1999–2000	Grimsby Town	3–3	Lincoln United	3 May 2000; Grimsby Town won 4–2 on penalties.
2000–01	Stamford	2–1	Boston United	31 January 2001
2001–02	Scunthorpe United	3–0	Grantham Town	1 August 2002
2002–03	Gainsborough Trinity	4–0	Grantham Town	29 April 2003

== More changes, (2003–2012) ==
From 2003 to 2004 onwards, following Boston United's promotion to the Football league, the Lincolnshire Senior County Cup has been competed for by Boston United, Grimsby Town, Lincoln City and Scunthorpe United and organised as a knock-out competition. Teams in levels 5–8 of the English football league system compete for the Lincolnshire Senior Shield while those in levels 9–11 compete in the Lincolnshire County Senior Trophy. As the draw for the 2007–08 Senior Cup was made before Boston United's double relegation they remained in this competition where they were knocked out by eventual winners Scunthorpe United. The 2008–09 competition was reduced to just the three Football League sides with Grimsby Town defeating Lincoln City in a semi-final tie before losing to Scunthorpe United in the final. The 2009–10 saw just three Football League sides again with Scunthorpe United defeating Grimsby Town in the semi-final 3–0 before defeating Lincoln City on penalties 4–2 after a 1–1 draw. In 2010–11, Grimsby beat Lincoln 4–2 at Blundell Park before losing at Scunthorpe 4–3 on penalties after a 1–1 draw.

Season	Winners	Result	Runner-up	Notes	Shield
2003–04	Scunthorpe United	1–1	Grimsby Town	13 May 2004; Scunthorpe United won 8–7 on penalties.	Grantham Town
2004–05	Lincoln City	3–2	Scunthorpe United	3 May 2005	Grantham Town
2005–06	Boston United	2–1	Scunthorpe United	10 April 2006	Lincoln United
2006–07	Lincoln City	1–0	Scunthorpe United	1 August 2007	Stamford
2007–08	Scunthorpe United	5–0	Lincoln City	30 April 2008	Gainsborough Trinity
2008–09	Scunthorpe United	4–0	Grimsby Town	2 August 2008	Stamford
2009–10	Scunthorpe United	1–1	Lincoln City	30 July 2009; Scunthorpe United won 4–2 on penalties.	Boston United
2010–11	Scunthorpe United	1–1	Grimsby Town	3 August 2010; Scunthorpe won 4–3 on penalties.	Stamford
2011–12	Grimsby Town	4–3	Lincoln City	2 August 2011	Grantham Town
2012–13	Grimsby Town	1–1	Lincoln City	31 July 2012; Grimsby Town won 5–4 on penalties.	Boston United

== Extended competition (2013–2015) ==
At the beginning of the 2013–14 campaign, the changed to being played by Lincolnshire's top five sides, Scunthorpe United, Grimsby Town, Lincoln City, Gainsborough Trinity and Boston United. Boston and Gainsborough would compete for a place in the semi-final while the other three sides would automatically be entered with the winner of that match. However the final despite always being a traditional pre-season event was now moved to October, with the semi-finals taking part in early August. The switch in date for the final meant that the sides began fielding a mixed team of youth and first team players as not to interrupt their domestic campaigns.

Season	Winners	Result	Runner-up	Notes
2013–14	Lincoln City	0–0	Gainsborough Trinity	22 October 2013; Lincoln City won 4–2 on penalties.
2014–15	Grimsby Town	2–1	Lincoln City	14 October 2014

== Further extended competition (2015–present) ==
At a meeting of member clubs in April 2015, it was agreed that the format for the competition would be extended to enable ten of the county's most senior clubs to play in a revised structure. Professional sides Grimsby Town, Lincoln City and Scunthorpe United have since begun to field their youth teams in the tournament which has seen the Non-League teams begin to dominate the finals.

Season	Winners	Result	Runner-up	Notes
2015–16	Gainsborough Trinity			
2016–17	Lincoln United			
2017–18	Gainsborough Trinity	2–2	Boston United	Gainsborough Trinity won on penalties.
2018–19	Cleethorpes Town	3–3	Stamford	Cleethorpes Town won on penalties.
2019–20	Cleethorpes Town	1–0	Boston United	
2021–22	Scunthorpe United	2–1	Gainsborough Trinity	
2022–23	Grantham Town	1–0	Spalding United	
2023–24	Scunthorpe United	3–2	Spalding United	
2024–25	Scunthorpe United	3–3	Cleethorpes Town	Scunthorpe United won 3-0 on penalties.
2025-26	Boston United	3-0	Grimsby Town	

== Past winners ==
The table summarises the winners of the Lincolnshire Senior County Cup (1934–) and its previous names (1881–1934). For the clubs in this category, victories in the lower level competitions are also summarised.

Club	Winner
Boston (1)	1925–26
Boston United (8+8)	1956–57, 1959–60, 1976–77, 1985–86, 1987–88, 1988–89, 2005–06, 2025-26
Boston United (8+8)	Other wins – LCS: 1934–35, 1935–36, 1937–38, 1945–46. 'A': 1949–50, 1954–55, 1955–56 Shield: 2009–10
Cleethorpes Town (2)	2018–19, 2019–20
Gainsborough Trinity (10+11)	1889–90, 1892–93, 1894–95, 1897–98, 1903–04, 1904–05, 1906–07, 1910–11, 1970–71, 2002–03, 2015–16, 2017–18
Gainsborough Trinity (10+11)	Other wins – LCS: 1946–47, 1947–48, 1948–49. 'A': 1950–51, 1951–52, 1957–58, 1958–59, 1963–64. Shield: 2007–08
Grantham (3+6)	1884–85, 1971–72, 1982–83
Grantham (3+6)	Other wins – LCS: 1936–37. 'A': 1953–54, 1960–61, 1961–62. Shield: 2003–04, 2004–05
Grimsby All Saints (1)	1895–96
Grimsby Town (38)	1885–86, 1888–89, 1896–97, 1898–99, 1899–1900, 1900–01, 1901–02, 1902–03, 1905–06, 1908–09, 1912–13, 1920–21, 1922–23, 1924–25, 1928–29, 1929–30, 1932–33, 1935–36, 1936–37, 1937–38, 1946–47, 1949–50, 1952–53, 1967–68, 1972–73, 1975–76, 1979–80, 1983–84, 1986–87, 1989–90, 1991–92, 1992–93, 1993–94, 1994–95, 1995–96, 1999–2000, 2011–12, 2012–13, 2014–15
Lincoln City (38)	1886–87, 1890–91, 1891–92, 1893–94, 1907–08, 1909–10, 1911–12, 1913–14, 1914–15, 1919–20, 1921–22, 1923–24, 1925–26, 1926–27, 1930–31, 1931–32, 1933–34, 1934–35, 1945–46, 1947–48, 1948–49, 1950–51, 1955–56 (Shared), 1961–62, 1963–64 (Shared), 1965–66 (Shared), 1966–67, 1968–69, 1969–70, 1974–75, 1980–81, 1981–82, 1984–85, 1990–91, 1997–98, 2004–05, 2006–07, 2013–14
Lincoln United (1)	2016–17
Scunthorpe United (20+3)	1951–52, 1953–54, 1954–55, 1955–56 (Shared), 1957–58, 1958–59, 1960–61, 1963–64 (Shared), 1965–66 (Shared), 1977–78, 1996–97, 1998–99, 2001–02, 2003–04, 2007–08, 2008–09, 2009–10, 2010–11, 2021–22, 2023-24, 2024-25
Scunthorpe United (20+3)	Other wins – LCS: 1938–39, 1939–40
Spilsby Town F.C. (3)	1881–82, 1882–83, 1883–84
Stamford (1)	2000–01

== See also ==
- Lincolnshire derby
