= Newark Town F.C. =

Association football club in England

Coordinates: 53°08′44.01″N 0°45′21.52″W

Newark Town
- Full name: Newark Town Football Club
- Nickname: Blue Army
- Founded: 1868 (Reformed 1994)
- Dissolved: 1939
- Ground: YMCA Sports Village, Bowbridge Road, Newark
- Chairman: Sarah Robinson
- Manager: Luke Parsons
- League: United Counties League Premier Division North
- 2025–26: United Counties League Premier Division North, 5th of 20
Home colours	Away colours

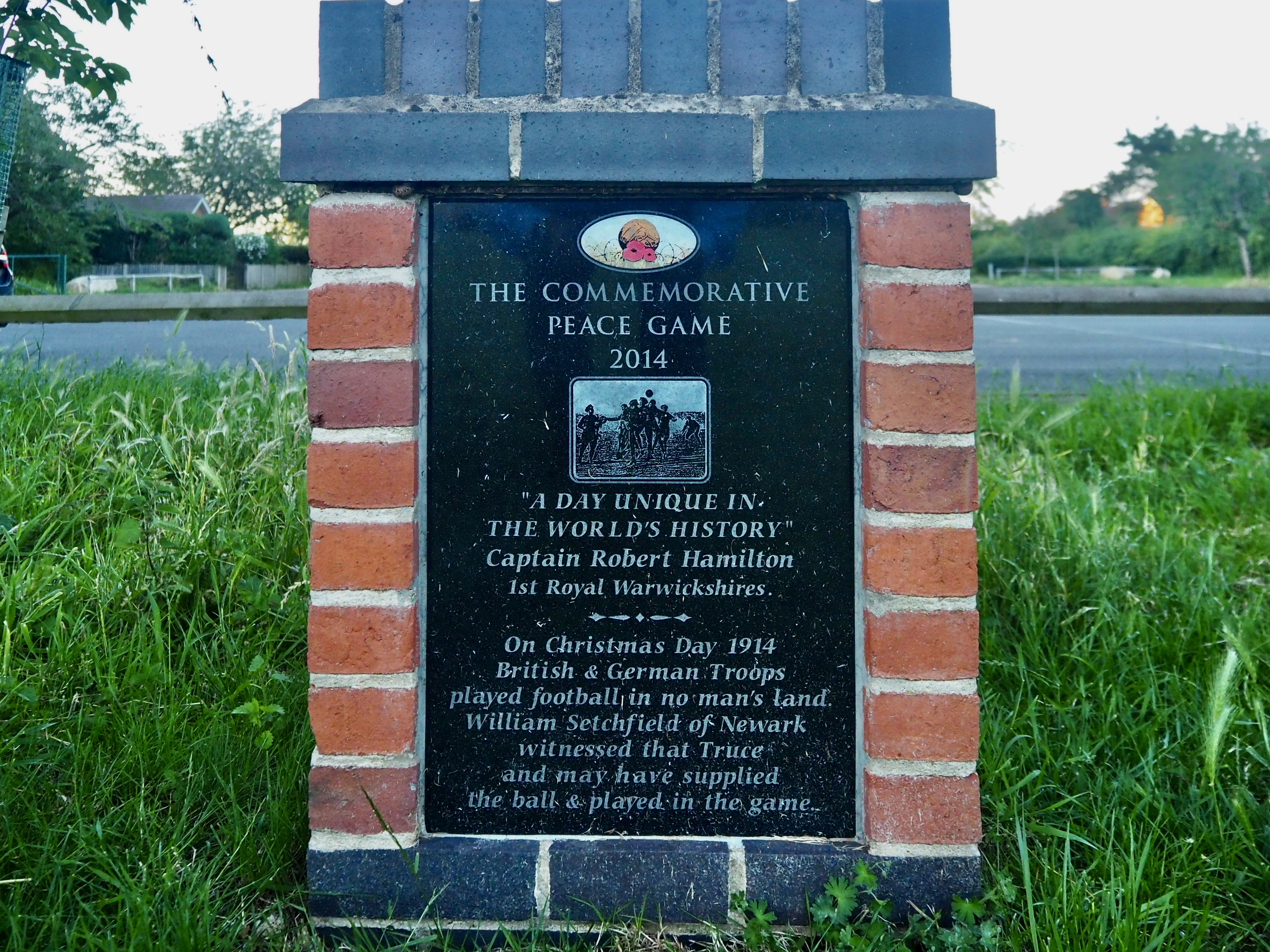
Memorial at Valley Prospect, Newark Town F.C., commemorating a Christmas Truce game during World War 1

Newark Town Football Club is a football club from Newark on Trent. They are currently members of the United Counties League Premier Division North.

== History ==
The original Newark F.C. was formed in 1868 and played for much of the time in the Midland Counties League.. The club disbanded at the start of the Second World War but the club had tasted FA Cup success during the early 1930s. They reached the second round of the FA Cup in the 1930–31 season and made the first round proper in three out of four seasons between 1929–30 and 1933–34.

For a brief period in the 1970s a group of players played under the Newark Town banner but it was not until the late 1980s that the club properly reformed. Initially the club only fielded junior teams but the decision was taken in 1994 to start an adults side and joined the Nottinghamshire Alliance in 1997. Newark progressed in that league, winning the Division One championship in 2003–04, earning the club promotion to the Central Midlands League. 2011 saw a re-organisation of the League and the club was placed in the South Division. They have since been transferred to the North Division.

Newark Town won the Central Midlands League North Division title during the 2021–22 season and gained promotion to the United Counties League Division One which is step 6 in the National League System.

== Community Ownership ==
"Newark Town Football Club Limited was registered under the Industrial and Provident Societies Act 1965. It is known as an Industrial and Provident Society (IPS) or a Community Benefit Society and is regulated by the Financial Services Authority."

== League history ==
- 1925–33 Midland League
- 1936–40 Midland League
- 1997–2003 Notts Alliance Division Two
- 2003–04 Notts Alliance Division One
- 2004–08 Central Midlands League Premier Division
- 2008–11 Central Midlands League Supreme Division
- 2011–13 Central Midlands League South Division
- 2013–22 Central Midlands League North Division
- 2022–24 United Counties League Division One
- 2024-present United Counties Premier Division North

== Records ==
- FA Cup
  - Second round 1930–31
- FA Vase
  - Third round 2024–25

== Junior Section ==
Newark Town FC includes juniors teams ranging from Under 7s to Under 18s

From the age groups U7s to U14s teams in the Young Elizabethan Football League on Saturdays. The age groups from U15s to U18s compete in the Notts Youth League

== Ladies Section ==
Newark Town Ladies senior team competes in the Notts Girls and Ladies League.

== Sunday Team ==
Newark Town Sunday team competes in the Newark Alliance

== Season-by-season record since 2011 ==
Season	Division	Position
2011–12	Central Midlands League, South Division	5th
2012–13	Central Midlands League, South Division	7th
2013–14	Central Midlands League, North Division	5th
2014–15	Central Midlands League, North Division	4th
2015–16	Central Midlands League, North Division	13th
2016–17	Central Midlands League, North Division	7th
2017-18	Central Midlands League, North Division	17th
2018-19	Central Midlands League, North Division	9th
2019-20	Central Midlands League, North Division	N/A
2020-21	Central Midlands League, North Division	N/A
2021-22	Central Midlands League, North Division	1st
2022-23	United Counties League, Division One	5th
2023-24	United Counties League, Division One	3rd

== See also ==
- Newark Town F.C. players
- Newark Town F.C. managers
