= FA Cup semi-finals =

English football games

The FA Cup semi-finals are played to determine which teams will contest the FA Cup Final. They are the penultimate phase of the FA Cup, the oldest football tournament in the world.

== Location ==
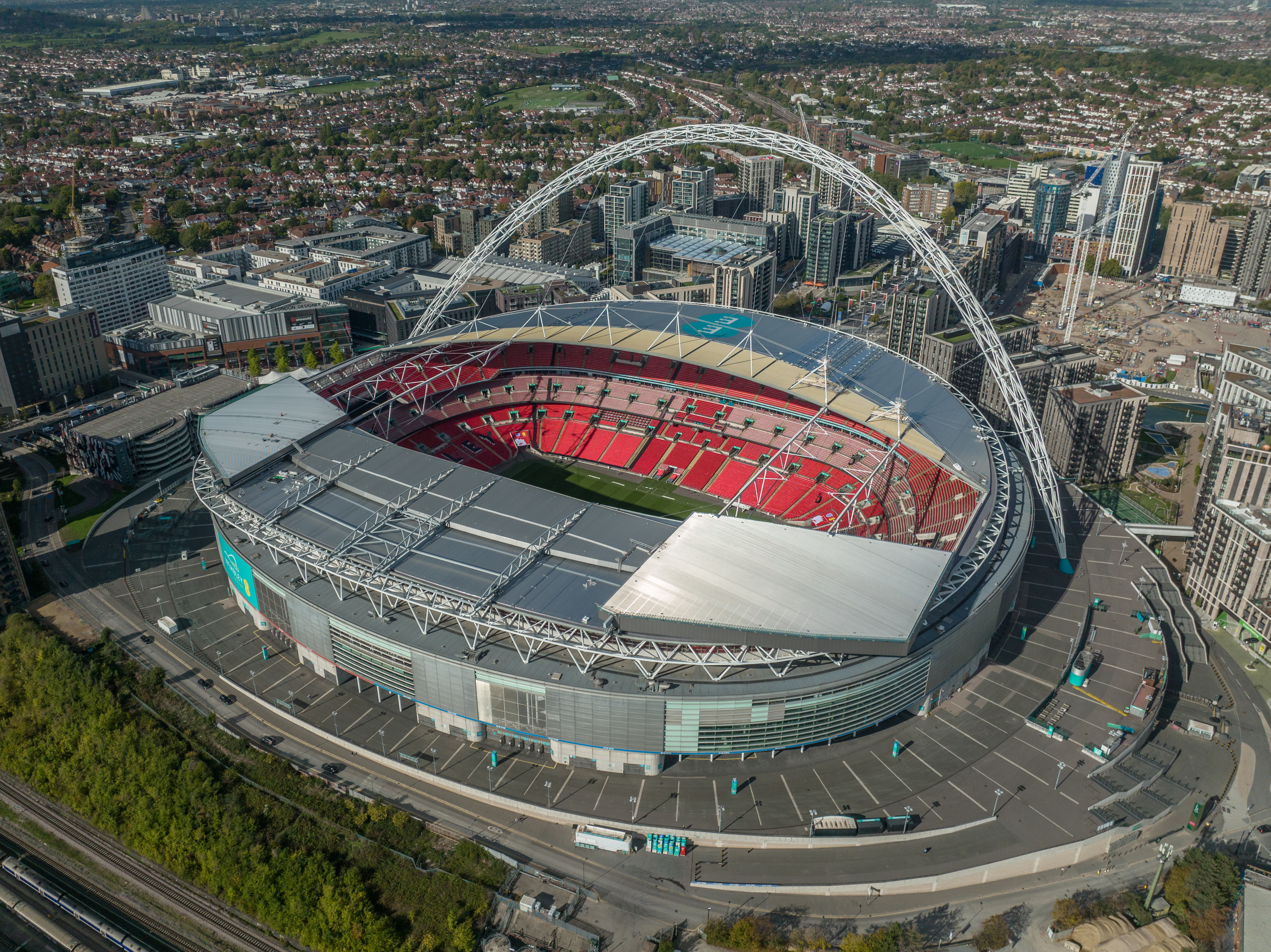
Since 2008, the new Wembley Stadium has been the home of the FA Cup semi-final.

The semi-finals have always been contested at neutral venues. Since 2008, all semi-finals have been held at the new Wembley. In the past any suitably large ground which was not the home ground of a team in that semi-final was used. Villa Park in Birmingham, Old Trafford in Manchester, and Hillsborough in Sheffield were common hosts. All semi-finals between 1871 and 1881 were played at Kennington Oval. The first neutral semi-final match outside London took place in 1882 in Huddersfield.

The 1989 semi-final between Liverpool and Nottingham Forest at Hillsborough, Sheffield, turned into tragedy when 97 supporters were killed in the stands due to overcrowding. The Hillsborough disaster had wide-ranging effects on future stadium design. Liverpool were granted a special dispensation to avoid playing their 2012 semi-final match against Everton on the 23rd anniversary of the disaster.

The 1991 North London derby semi-final between Arsenal and Tottenham Hotspur was the first to be played at Wembley, the traditional venue for the FA Cup Final. Two years later both semi-finals were held at Wembley after the first FA Cup Steel City derby–between Sheffield clubs Wednesday and United–was switched from the original venue of Elland Road, Leeds, after fans of both Sheffield sides protested.

This was repeated in 1994, although a replay between Manchester United and Oldham Athletic was held at Maine Road, Manchester. From 1995 to 1999 and from 2001 to 2004 other neutral grounds were used, though in 2000 both matches were played at the old Wembley, in its final year of operation. In 2005 both semi-finals were played at the Millennium Stadium, Cardiff. However, in 2006 the FA decided to revert to the neutral ground system, with Villa Park and Old Trafford hosting the games.

In 2003, it was announced that all future semi-finals would be played at the new Wembley Stadium, once it had opened; this took effect in 2008. The decision was mainly for financial reasons, to allow the FA to recoup some of the costs of rebuilding the stadium. However, the move was opposed by traditionalists and drew criticism from some supporters' groups. Over a decade after the move, Aston Villa (amongst others) have called for the semi-finals to be regionalised once again.

Tottenham Hotspur's 2018 semi-final was to some extent a home match for them, as they played their home games at Wembley that season while their new stadium was under construction. However, for the semi-final, it was treated as a neutral venue.

== Format ==
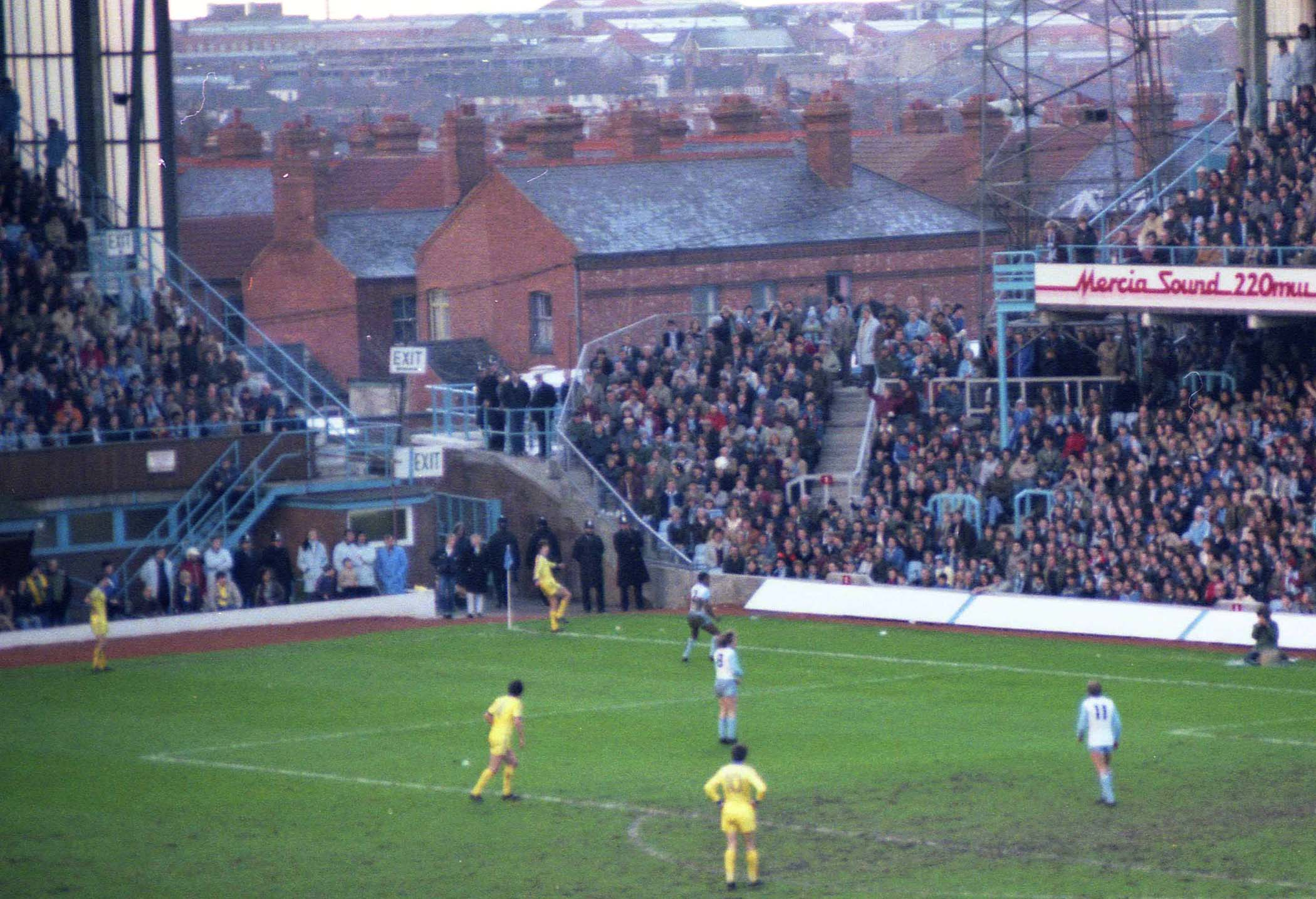
Highfield Road in Coventry (1982 image) hosted the only semi-final third replay in 1979–80.

In the past, there would be a replay if a semi-final match was drawn. If the replay was also drawn, there would be a second replay. In theory, an unlimited number of games could be played to obtain a winner. For example, in 1980 it took four games to decide the tie between Arsenal and Liverpool. This was the most games needed to settle an FA Cup semi-final, although there were several occasions when three games were played.

Queen's Park chose not to contest the 1871–72 replay match with Wanderers.

Prior to the 1992 semi-finals, the only semi-final played under different rules to this was the 1989 semi-final between Liverpool and Nottingham Forest at Old Trafford, which had been rearranged due to the Hillsborough disaster, for which it had been declared in advance that the game would be decided by extra time and penalties if necessary. In 1991 the FA decided that only one replay should be played (starting with the 1991–92 competition). If this game ended in a draw, extra time would be played, followed by penalty kicks if the match was still even. From the 1999-2000 competition it was decided that the semi-finals should be decided in one game, with extra time and penalties if the score was level after 90 minutes. Replays are still used in earlier rounds, however, though they were eliminated in the quarter-finals in 2016. The last FA Cup semi-final replay, in 1999, saw Manchester United take on Arsenal at Villa Park. This turned out to become one of the most memorable semi-finals of all time, with Peter Schmeichel saving a last-minute penalty from Dennis Bergkamp and a Ryan Giggs extra time goal deciding the outcome in Manchester United's favour. In 2003 this goal was voted the greatest ever in FA Cup history.

From 2016 to 2017, a fourth substitute was allowed in semi-final matches if the game went into extra time.

=== Exceptions ===
There were no semi-finals played in the 1872–73 competition. Under the rules at the time, holders Wanderers received a bye to the final. Queen's Park again decided not to contest a semi-final, so Oxford University advanced automatically.

Between 1877 and 1881 only one semi-final was played due to the format of the competition leaving three teams remaining.

== Records ==
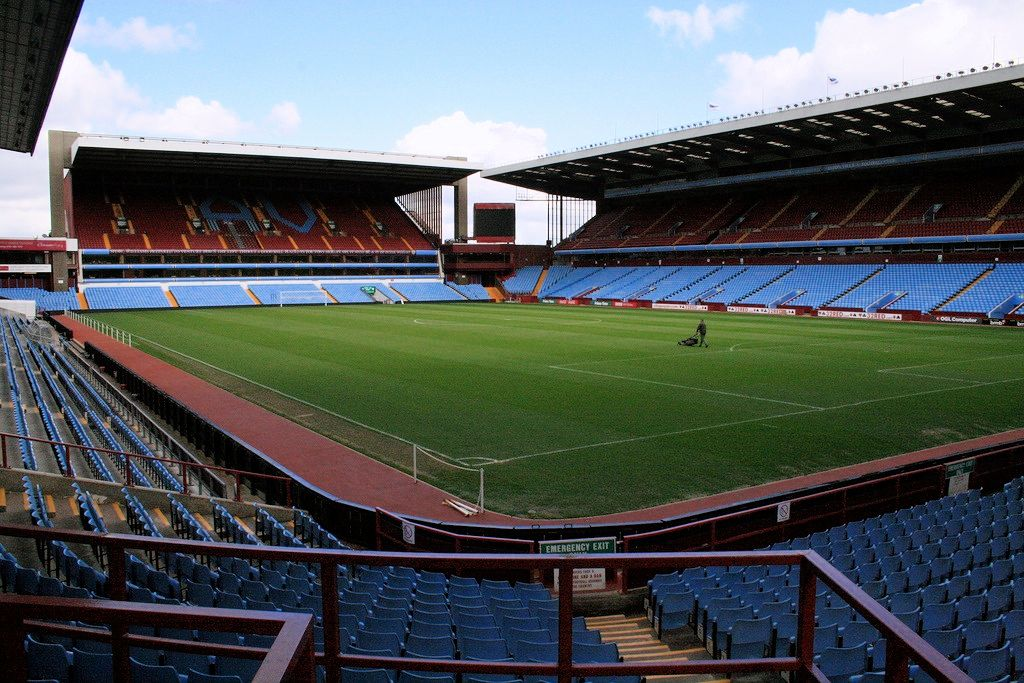
Villa Park in Birmingham hosted 55 semi-final matches between 1901 and 2007, more than any other stadium.

Villa Park is the most used stadium in FA Cup semi–final history, having hosted 57 semi–finals.

The record for most appearances in semi-finals is held by Manchester United, with 32 in total.

The record for most consecutive semi-final appearances is held by Manchester City, with eight successive semi-finals between the years of 2019 to 2026.

The highest attendance for an FA Cup semi-final is 88,141 for Everton's penalty win over Manchester United on 19 April 2009. It was the fourth semi-final to be played at the new Wembley Stadium.

The highest winning margin was Newcastle United's 6–0 victory over Fulham in the 1908 Anfield semi-final.

The highest post-war winning margin was Stoke City's 5–0 victory over Bolton Wanderers in the second 2011 semi-final on 17 April 2011.

The highest-scoring match was Hull City's 5–3 victory over Sheffield United in the second 2014 semi-final.

== List of FA Cup semi-finals ==
=== Key ===
| * | Match went to extra time |
| † | Match decided by a penalty shoot-out after extra time |
| ‡ | Winning team won the Double (League title and FA Cup) |
| § | Winning team won the Domestic Treble (League title, FA Cup and League Cup) |
| # | Winning team won the Continental Treble (League title, FA Cup and European Cup/Champions League) |
| Italics | Team from outside the top level of English football (since the formation of The Football League in 1888) |

=== Results ===
| Year | SF | Winners | Losers | Score | Venue |
|---|---|---|---|---|---|
| 1872 | 1 | Royal Engineers | Crystal Palace | 0–0 | Kennington Oval |
| 1872 | 1 | Royal Engineers | Crystal Palace | 3–0 | Kennington Oval |
| 1872 | 2 | Wanderers | Queen's Park | 0–0 | Kennington Oval |
| 1872 | 2 | Wanderers | Queen's Park | w/o | (Note: Queen's Park could not afford a second trip to London for their semi-final replay and were forced to withdraw.) |
| 1873 | 1 | Oxford University | Queen's Park | w/o | (Note: Queen's Park once again withdrew from the FA Cup at the semi-final stage.) |
| 1873 | Bye | Wanderers (holders) | | | |
| 1874 | 1 | Oxford University | Clapham Rovers | 1–0 | Kennington Oval |
| 1874 | 2 | Royal Engineers | Swifts | 2–0 | Kennington Oval |
| 1875 | 1 | Old Etonians | Shropshire Wanderers | 1–0 | Kennington Oval |
| 1875 | 2 | Royal Engineers | Oxford University | 1–1 | Kennington Oval |
| 1875 | 2 | Royal Engineers | Oxford University | 1–0 | Kennington Oval |
| 1876 | 1 | Old Etonians | Oxford University | 1–0 | Kennington Oval |
| 1876 | 2 | Wanderers | Swifts | 2–1 | Kennington Oval |
| 1877 | 1 | Wanderers | Cambridge University | 1–0 | Kennington Oval |
| 1877 | Bye | Oxford University | | | |
| 1878 | 1 | Royal Engineers | Old Harrovians | 2–1 | Kennington Oval |
| 1878 | Bye | Wanderers | | | |
| 1879 | 1 | Old Etonians | Nottingham Forest | 2–1 | Kennington Oval |
| 1879 | Bye | Clapham Rovers | | | |
| 1880 | 1 | Oxford University | Nottingham Forest | 1–0 | Kennington Oval |
| 1880 | Bye | Clapham Rovers | | | |
| 1881 | 1 | Old Carthusians | Darwen | 4–1 | Kennington Oval |
| 1881 | Bye | Old Etonians | | | |
| 1882 | 1 | Blackburn Rovers | The Wednesday | 0–0 | Fartown Ground |
| 1882 | 1 | Blackburn Rovers | The Wednesday | 5–1 | Whalley Range |
| 1882 | 2 | Old Etonians | Marlow | 5–0 | Kennington Oval |
| 1883 | 1 | Blackburn Olympic | Old Carthusians | 4–0 | Whalley Range |
| 1883 | 2 | Old Etonians | Notts County | 2–1 | Kennington Oval |
| 1884 | 1 | Blackburn Rovers | Notts County | 1–0 | Aston Lower Grounds |
| 1884 | 2 | Queen's Park | Blackburn Olympic | 4–1 | Trent Bridge |
| 1885 | 1 | Blackburn Rovers | Old Carthusians | 5–1 | Trent Bridge |
| 1885 | 2 | Queen's Park | Nottingham Forest | 1–1 | Racecourse Ground |
| 1885 | 2 | Queen's Park | Nottingham Forest | 3–0 | Merchiston Castle School |
| 1886 | 1 | Blackburn Rovers | Swifts | 2–1 | Racecourse Ground |
| 1886 | 2 | West Bromwich Albion | Small Heath Alliance | 4–0 | Aston Lower Grounds |
| 1887 | 1 | Aston Villa | Rangers | 3–1 | Alexandra Recreation Ground |
| 1887 | 2 | West Bromwich Albion | Preston North End | 3–1 | Trent Bridge |
| 1888 | 1 | Preston North End | Crewe Alexandra | 4–0 | Anfield |
| 1888 | 2 | West Bromwich Albion | Derby Junction | 3–0 | Victoria Ground |
| 1889 | 1 | Preston North End ‡ | West Bromwich Albion | 1–0 | Bramall Lane |
| 1889 | 2 | Wolverhampton Wanderers | Blackburn Rovers | 1–1 | Alexandra Recreation Ground |
| 1889 | 2 | Wolverhampton Wanderers | Blackburn Rovers | 3–1 | Alexandra Recreation Ground |
| 1890 | 1 | Blackburn Rovers | Wolverhampton Wanderers | 1–0 | Racecourse Ground |
| 1890 | 2 | The Wednesday (Note: Non-League club) | Bolton Wanderers | 2–1 | Wellington Road |
| 1891 | 1 | Blackburn Rovers | West Bromwich Albion | 3–2 | Victoria Ground |
| 1891 | 2 | Notts County | Sunderland | 3–3 | Bramall Lane |
| 1891 | 2 | Notts County | Sunderland | 2–0 | Bramall Lane |
| 1892 | 1 | Aston Villa | Sunderland | 4–1 | Bramall Lane |
| 1892 | 2 | West Bromwich Albion | Nottingham Forest | 1–1 | Molineux |
| 1892 | 2 | West Bromwich Albion | Nottingham Forest | 1–1 | Molineux |
| 1892 | 2 | West Bromwich Albion | Nottingham Forest | 6–2 | Racecourse Ground |
| 1893 | 1 | Everton | Preston North End | 2–2 | Bramall Lane |
| 1893 | 1 | Everton | Preston North End | 0–0 | Bramall Lane |
| 1893 | 1 | Everton | Preston North End | 2–1 | Ewood Park |
| 1893 | 2 | Wolverhampton Wanderers | Blackburn Rovers | 2–1 | Town Ground |
| 1894 | 1 | Bolton Wanderers | The Wednesday | 2–1 | Fallowfield Stadium |
| 1894 | 2 | Notts County (Note: Club in second flight of league system) | Blackburn Rovers | 1–0 | Bramall Lane |
| 1895 | 1 | Aston Villa | Sunderland | 2–1 | Ewood Park |
| 1895 | 2 | West Bromwich Albion | The Wednesday | 2–0 | Racecourse Ground |
| 1896 | 1 | The Wednesday | Bolton Wanderers | 1–1 | Goodison Park |
| 1896 | 1 | The Wednesday | Bolton Wanderers | 3–1 | Town Ground |
| 1896 | 2 | Wolverhampton Wanderers | Derby County | 2–1 | Wellington Road |
| 1897 | 1 | Aston Villa ‡ | Liverpool | 3–0 | Bramall Lane |
| 1897 | 2 | Everton | Derby County | 3–2 | Victoria Ground |
| 1898 | 1 | Derby County | Everton | 3–1 | Molineux |
| 1898 | 2 | Nottingham Forest | Southampton | 1–1 | Bramall Lane |
| 1898 | 2 | Nottingham Forest | Southampton | 2–0 | Crystal Palace |
| 1899 | 1 | Derby County | Stoke City | 3–1 | Molineux |
| 1899 | 2 | Sheffield United | Liverpool | 2–2 | City Ground |
| 1899 | 2 | Sheffield United | Liverpool | 4–4 | Burnden Park |
| 1899 | 2 | Sheffield United | Liverpool | (Note: Match abandoned at half time due to a crush in the crowd and dark conditions.) | Fallowfield Stadium |
| 1899 | 2 | Sheffield United | Liverpool | 1–0 | Baseball Ground |
| 1900 | 1 | Bury | Nottingham Forest | 1–1 | Victoria Ground |
| 1900 | 1 | Bury | Nottingham Forest | 3–2 | Bramall Lane |
| 1900 | 2 | Southampton | Millwall Athletic | 0–0 | Crystal Palace |
| 1900 | 2 | Southampton | Millwall Athletic | 3–0 | Elm Park |
| 1901 | 1 | Sheffield United | Aston Villa | 2–2 | City Ground |
| 1901 | 1 | Sheffield United | Aston Villa | 3–0 | Baseball Ground |
| 1901 | 2 | Tottenham Hotspur | West Bromwich Albion | 4–0 | Villa Park |
| 1902 | 1 | Sheffield United | Derby County | 2–2 | The Hawthorns |
| 1902 | 1 | Sheffield United | Derby County | 1–1 | Molineux |
| 1902 | 1 | Sheffield United | Derby County | 1–0 | City Ground |
| 1902 | 2 | Southampton | Nottingham Forest | 3–1 | White Hart Lane |
| 1903 | 1 | Bury | Aston Villa | 3–0 | Goodison Park |
| 1903 | 2 | Derby County | Millwall Athletic | 3–0 | Villa Park |
| 1904 | 1 | Bolton Wanderers | Derby County | 1–0 | Molineux |
| 1904 | 2 | Manchester City | The Wednesday | 3–0 | Goodison Park |
| 1905 | 1 | Aston Villa | Everton | 1–1 | Victoria Ground |
| 1905 | 1 | Aston Villa | Everton | 2–1 | City Ground |
| 1905 | 2 | Newcastle United | The Wednesday | 1–0 | Hyde Road |
| 1906 | 1 | Everton | Liverpool | 2–0 | Villa Park |
| 1906 | 2 | Newcastle United | Woolwich Arsenal | 2–0 | Victoria Ground |
| 1907 | 1 | Everton | West Bromwich Albion | 2–1 | Burnden Park |
| 1907 | 2 | The Wednesday | Woolwich Arsenal | 3–1 | St Andrew's |
| 1908 | 1 | Newcastle United | Fulham | 6–0 | Anfield |
| 1908 | 2 | Wolverhampton Wanderers | Southampton | 2–0 | Stamford Bridge |
| 1909 | 1 | Bristol City | Derby County | 1–1 | Stamford Bridge |
| 1909 | 1 | Bristol City | Derby County | 2–1 | St Andrew's |
| 1909 | 2 | Manchester United | Newcastle United | 1–0 | Bramall Lane |
| 1910 | 1 | Barnsley | Everton | 0–0 | Elland Road |
| 1910 | 1 | Barnsley | Everton | 3–0 | Old Trafford |
| 1910 | 2 | Newcastle United | Swindon Town | 2–0 | White Hart Lane |
| 1911 | 1 | Bradford City | Blackburn Rovers | 3–0 | Bramall Lane |
| 1911 | 2 | Newcastle United | Chelsea | 3–0 | St Andrew's |
| 1912 | 1 | Barnsley | Swindon Town | 0–0 | Stamford Bridge |
| 1912 | 1 | Barnsley | Swindon Town | 1–0 | Meadow Lane |
| 1912 | 2 | West Bromwich Albion | Blackburn Rovers | 0–0 | Anfield |
| 1912 | 2 | West Bromwich Albion | Blackburn Rovers | 1–0* | Hillsborough |
| 1913 | 1 | Aston Villa | Oldham Athletic | 1–0 | Ewood Park |
| 1913 | 2 | Sunderland | Burnley | 0–0 | Bramall Lane |
| 1913 | 2 | Sunderland | Burnley | 3–2 | St Andrew's |
| 1914 | 1 | Burnley | Sheffield United | 0–0 | Old Trafford |
| 1914 | 1 | Burnley | Sheffield United | 1–0 | Goodison Park |
| 1914 | 2 | Liverpool | Aston Villa | 2–0 | White Hart Lane |
| 1915 | 1 | Chelsea | Everton | 2–0 | Villa Park |
| 1915 | 2 | Sheffield United | Bolton Wanderers | 2–1 | Ewood Park |
| 1920 | 1 | Aston Villa | Chelsea | 3–1 | Bramall Lane |
| 1920 | 2 | Huddersfield Town | Bristol City | 2–1 | Stamford Bridge |
| 1921 | 1 | Tottenham Hotspur | Preston North End | 2–1 | Hillsborough |
| 1921 | 2 | Wolverhampton Wanderers | Cardiff City | 0–0 | Anfield |
| 1921 | 2 | Wolverhampton Wanderers | Cardiff City | 3–1 | Old Trafford |
| 1922 | 1 | Huddersfield Town | Notts County | 3–1 | Turf Moor |
| 1922 | 2 | Preston North End | Tottenham Hotspur | 2–1 | Hillsborough |
| 1923 | 1 | Bolton Wanderers | Sheffield United | 1–0 | Old Trafford |
| 1923 | 2 | West Ham United | Derby County | 5–2 | Stamford Bridge |
| 1924 | 1 | Aston Villa | Burnley | 3–0 | Bramall Lane |
| 1924 | 2 | Newcastle United | Manchester City | 2–0 | St Andrew's |
| 1925 | 1 | Cardiff City | Blackburn Rovers | 3–1 | Meadow Lane |
| 1925 | 2 | Sheffield United | Southampton | 2–0 | Stamford Bridge |
| 1926 | 1 | Bolton Wanderers | Swansea Town | 3–0 | White Hart Lane |
| 1926 | 2 | Manchester City | Manchester United | 3–0 | Bramall Lane |
| 1927 | 1 | Arsenal | Southampton | 2–1 | Stamford Bridge |
| 1927 | 2 | Cardiff City | Reading | 3–0 | Molineux |
| 1928 | 1 | Blackburn Rovers | Arsenal | 1–0 | Filbert Street |
| 1928 | 2 | Huddersfield Town | Sheffield United | 2–2 | Old Trafford |
| 1928 | 2 | Huddersfield Town | Sheffield United | 0–0 | Goodison Park |
| 1928 | 2 | Huddersfield Town | Sheffield United | 1–0 | Maine Road |
| 1929 | 1 | Bolton Wanderers | Huddersfield Town | 3–1 | Anfield |
| 1929 | 2 | Portsmouth | Aston Villa | 1–0 | Highbury |
| 1930 | 1 | Arsenal | Hull City | 2–2 | Elland Road |
| 1930 | 1 | Arsenal | Hull City | 1–0 | Villa Park |
| 1930 | 2 | Huddersfield Town | Sheffield Wednesday | 2–1 | Old Trafford |
| 1931 | 1 | Birmingham | Sunderland | 2–0 | Elland Road |
| 1931 | 2 | West Bromwich Albion | Everton | 1–0 | Old Trafford |
| 1932 | 1 | Arsenal | Manchester City | 1–0 | Villa Park |
| 1932 | 2 | Newcastle United | Chelsea | 2–1 | Leeds Road |
| 1933 | 1 | Everton | West Ham United | 2–1 | Molineux |
| 1933 | 2 | Manchester City | Derby County | 3–2 | Leeds Road |
| 1934 | 1 | Manchester City | Aston Villa | 6–1 | Leeds Road |
| 1934 | 2 | Portsmouth | Leicester City | 4–1 | St Andrew's |
| 1935 | 1 | Sheffield Wednesday | Burnley | 3–0 | Villa Park |
| 1935 | 2 | West Bromwich Albion | Bolton Wanderers | 1–1 | Elland Road |
| 1935 | 2 | West Bromwich Albion | Bolton Wanderers | 2–0 | Victoria Ground |
| 1936 | 1 | Arsenal | Grimsby Town | 1–0 | Leeds Road |
| 1936 | 2 | Sheffield United | Fulham | 2–1 | Molineux |
| 1937 | 1 | Preston North End | West Bromwich Albion | 4–1 | Highbury |
| 1937 | 2 | Sunderland | Millwall (Note: Club in third flight of league system) | 2–1 | Leeds Road |
| 1938 | 1 | Huddersfield Town | Sunderland | 3–1 | Ewood Park |
| 1938 | 2 | Preston North End | Aston Villa | 2–1 | Bramall Lane |
| 1939 | 1 | Portsmouth | Huddersfield Town | 2–1 | Highbury |
| 1939 | 2 | Wolverhampton Wanderers | Grimsby Town | 5–0 | Old Trafford |
| 1946 | 1 | Charlton Athletic | Bolton Wanderers | 2–0 | Villa Park |
| 1946 | 2 | Derby County | Birmingham City | 1–1 | Hillsborough |
| 1946 | 2 | Derby County | Birmingham City | 4–1* | Maine Road |
| 1947 | 1 | Charlton Athletic | Newcastle United | 4–0 | Elland Road |
| 1947 | 2 | Burnley | Liverpool | 0–0* | Ewood Park |
| 1947 | 2 | Burnley | Liverpool | 1–0 | Maine Road |
| 1948 | 1 | Manchester United | Derby County | 3–1 | Hillsborough |
| 1948 | 2 | Blackpool | Tottenham Hotspur | 3–1* | Villa Park |
| 1949 | 1 | Wolverhampton Wanderers | Manchester United | 1–1 | Hillsborough |
| 1949 | 1 | Wolverhampton Wanderers | Manchester United | 1–0 | Goodison Park |
| 1949 | 2 | Leicester City | Portsmouth | 3–1 | Highbury |
| 1950 | 1 | Liverpool | Everton | 2–0 | Maine Road |
| 1950 | 2 | Arsenal | Chelsea | 2–2 | White Hart Lane |
| 1950 | 2 | Arsenal | Chelsea | 1–0* | White Hart Lane |
| 1951 | 1 | Newcastle United | Wolverhampton Wanderers | 0–0 | Hillsborough |
| 1951 | 1 | Newcastle United | Wolverhampton Wanderers | 2–1 | Leeds Road |
| 1951 | 2 | Blackpool | Birmingham City | 0–0 | Maine Road |
| 1951 | 2 | Blackpool | Birmingham City | 2–1 | Goodison Park |
| 1952 | 1 | Arsenal | Chelsea | 1–1 | White Hart Lane |
| 1952 | 1 | Arsenal | Chelsea | 3–0 | White Hart Lane |
| 1952 | 2 | Newcastle United | Blackburn Rovers | 0–0 | Hillsborough |
| 1952 | 2 | Newcastle United | Blackburn Rovers | 2–1 | Elland Road |
| 1953 | 1 | Blackpool | Tottenham Hotspur | 2–1 | Villa Park |
| 1953 | 2 | Bolton Wanderers | Everton | 4–3 | Maine Road |
| 1954 | 1 | Preston North End | Sheffield Wednesday | 2–0 | Maine Road |
| 1954 | 2 | West Bromwich Albion | Port Vale | 2–1 | Villa Park |
| 1955 | 1 | Manchester City | Sunderland | 1–0 | Villa Park |
| 1955 | 2 | Newcastle United | York City | 1–1 | Hillsborough |
| 1955 | 2 | Newcastle United | York City | 1–0 | Roker Park |
| 1956 | 1 | Birmingham City | Sunderland | 3–0 | Hillsborough |
| 1956 | 2 | Manchester City | Tottenham Hotspur | 1–0 | Villa Park |
| 1957 | 1 | Aston Villa | West Bromwich Albion | 2–2 | Molineux |
| 1957 | 1 | Aston Villa | West Bromwich Albion | 1–0 | St Andrew's |
| 1957 | 2 | Manchester United | Birmingham City | 2–0 | Hillsborough |
| 1958 | 1 | Bolton Wanderers | Blackburn Rovers | 2–1 | Maine Road |
| 1958 | 2 | Manchester United | Fulham | 2–2 | Villa Park |
| 1958 | 2 | Manchester United | Fulham | 5–3 | Highbury |
| 1959 | 1 | Luton Town | Norwich City | 1–1 | White Hart Lane |
| 1959 | 1 | Luton Town | Norwich City | 1–0 | St Andrew's |
| 1959 | 2 | Nottingham Forest | Aston Villa | 1–0 | Hillsborough |
| 1960 | 1 | Blackburn Rovers | Sheffield Wednesday | 2–1 | Maine Road |
| 1960 | 2 | Wolverhampton Wanderers | Aston Villa | 1–0 | The Hawthorns |
| 1961 | 1 | Leicester City | Sheffield United | 0–0 | Elland Road |
| 1961 | 1 | Leicester City | Sheffield United | 0–0* | City Ground |
| 1961 | 1 | Leicester City | Sheffield United | 2–0* | St Andrew's |
| 1961 | 2 | Tottenham Hotspur ‡ | Burnley | 3–0 | Villa Park |
| 1962 | 1 | Burnley | Fulham | 1–1 | Villa Park |
| 1962 | 1 | Burnley | Fulham | 2–1 | Filbert Street |
| 1962 | 2 | Tottenham Hotspur | Manchester United | 3–1 | Hillsborough |
| 1963 | 1 | Leicester City | Liverpool | 1–0 | Hillsborough |
| 1963 | 2 | Manchester United | Southampton | 1–0 | Villa Park |
| 1964 | 1 | Preston North End | Swansea Town | 2–1 | Villa Park |
| 1964 | 2 | West Ham United | Manchester United | 3–1 | Hillsborough |
| 1965 | 1 | Liverpool | Chelsea | 2–0 | Villa Park |
| 1965 | 2 | Leeds United | Manchester United | 0–0 | Hillsborough |
| 1965 | 2 | Leeds United | Manchester United | 1–0 | City Ground |
| 1966 | 1 | Everton | Manchester United | 1–0 | Burnden Park |
| 1966 | 2 | Sheffield Wednesday | Chelsea | 2–0 | Villa Park |
| 1967 | 1 | Chelsea | Leeds United | 1–0 | Villa Park |
| 1967 | 2 | Tottenham Hotspur | Nottingham Forest | 2–1 | Hillsborough |
| 1968 | 1 | Everton | Leeds United | 1–0 | Old Trafford |
| 1968 | 2 | West Bromwich Albion | Birmingham City | 2–0 | Villa Park |
| 1969 | 1 | Leicester City | West Bromwich Albion | 1–0 | Hillsborough |
| 1969 | 2 | Manchester City | Everton | 1–0 | Villa Park |
| 1970 | 1 | Chelsea | Watford | 5–1 | White Hart Lane |
| 1970 | 2 | Leeds United | Manchester United | 0–0 | Hillsborough |
| 1970 | 2 | Leeds United | Manchester United | 0–0* | Villa Park |
| 1970 | 2 | Leeds United | Manchester United | 1–0 | Burnden Park |
| 1971 | 1 | Arsenal ‡ | Stoke City | 2–2 | Hillsborough |
| 1971 | 1 | Arsenal ‡ | Stoke City | 2–0 | Villa Park |
| 1971 | 2 | Liverpool | Everton | 2–1 | Old Trafford |
| 1972 | 1 | Arsenal | Stoke City | 1–1 | Villa Park |
| 1972 | 1 | Arsenal | Stoke City | 2–1 | Goodison Park |
| 1972 | 2 | Leeds United | Birmingham City | 3–0 | Hillsborough |
| 1973 | 1 | Leeds United | Wolverhampton Wanderers | 1–0 | Maine Road |
| 1973 | 2 | Sunderland | Arsenal | 2–1 | Hillsborough |
| 1974 | 1 | Liverpool | Leicester City | 0–0 | Old Trafford |
| 1974 | 1 | Liverpool | Leicester City | 3–1 | Villa Park |
| 1974 | 2 | Newcastle United | Burnley | 2–0 | Hillsborough |
| 1975 | 1 | Fulham | Birmingham City | 1–1 | Hillsborough |
| 1975 | 1 | Fulham | Birmingham City | 1–0* | Maine Road |
| 1975 | 2 | West Ham United | Ipswich Town | 0–0 | Villa Park |
| 1975 | 2 | West Ham United | Ipswich Town | 2–1 | Stamford Bridge |
| 1976 | 1 | Manchester United | Derby County | 2–0 | Hillsborough |
| 1976 | 2 | Southampton | Crystal Palace | 2–0 | Stamford Bridge |
| 1977 | 1 | Manchester United | Leeds United | 2–1 | Hillsborough |
| 1977 | 2 | Liverpool | Everton | 2–2 | Maine Road |
| 1977 | 2 | Liverpool | Everton | 3–0 | Maine Road |
| 1978 | 1 | Arsenal | Orient | 3–0 | Stamford Bridge |
| 1978 | 2 | Ipswich Town | West Bromwich Albion | 3–1 | Highbury |
| 1979 | 1 | Arsenal | Wolverhampton Wanderers | 2–0 | Villa Park |
| 1979 | 2 | Manchester United | Liverpool | 2–2 | Maine Road |
| 1979 | 2 | Manchester United | Liverpool | 1–0 | Goodison Park |
| 1980 | 1 | Arsenal | Liverpool | 0–0 | Hillsborough |
| 1980 | 1 | Arsenal | Liverpool | 1–1* | Villa Park |
| 1980 | 1 | Arsenal | Liverpool | 1–1* | Villa Park |
| 1980 | 1 | Arsenal | Liverpool | 1–0 | Highfield Road |
| 1980 | 2 | West Ham United | Everton | 1–1 | Villa Park |
| 1980 | 2 | West Ham United | Everton | 2–1 | Elland Road |
| 1981 | 1 | Manchester City | Ipswich Town | 1–0* | Villa Park |
| 1981 | 2 | Tottenham Hotspur | Wolverhampton Wanderers | 2–2* | Hillsborough |
| 1981 | 2 | Tottenham Hotspur | Wolverhampton Wanderers | 3–0 | Highbury |
| 1982 | 1 | Queens Park Rangers | West Bromwich Albion | 1–0 | Highbury |
| 1982 | 2 | Tottenham Hotspur | Leicester City | 2–0 | Villa Park |
| 1983 | 1 | Manchester United | Arsenal | 2–1 | Villa Park |
| 1983 | 2 | Brighton & Hove Albion | Sheffield Wednesday | 2–1 | Highbury |
| 1984 | 1 | Everton | Southampton | 1–0* | Highbury |
| 1984 | 2 | Watford | Plymouth Argyle | 1–0 | Villa Park |
| 1985 | 1 | Manchester United | Liverpool | 2–2* | Goodison Park |
| 1985 | 1 | Manchester United | Liverpool | 2–1 | Maine Road |
| 1985 | 2 | Everton | Luton Town | 2–1* | Villa Park |
| 1986 | 1 | Liverpool ‡ | Southampton | 2–0* | White Hart Lane |
| 1986 | 2 | Everton | Sheffield Wednesday | 2–1* | Villa Park |
| 1987 | 1 | Coventry City | Leeds United | 3–2* | Hillsborough |
| 1987 | 2 | Tottenham Hotspur | Watford | 4–1 | Villa Park |
| 1988 | 1 | Liverpool | Nottingham Forest | 2–1 | Hillsborough |
| 1988 | 2 | Wimbledon | Luton Town | 2–1 | White Hart Lane |
| 1989 | 1 | Liverpool | Nottingham Forest | P–P | Hillsborough (Note: Abandoned after 6 minutes (see Hillsborough Disaster).) |
| 1989 | 1 | Liverpool | Nottingham Forest | 3–1 | Old Trafford |
| 1989 | 2 | Everton | Norwich City | 1–0 | Villa Park |
| 1990 | 1 | Manchester United | Oldham Athletic | 3–3* | Maine Road |
| 1990 | 1 | Manchester United | Oldham Athletic | 2–1* | Maine Road |
| 1990 | 2 | Crystal Palace | Liverpool | 4–3* | Villa Park |
| 1991 | 1 | Nottingham Forest | West Ham United | 4–0 | Villa Park |
| 1991 | 2 | Tottenham Hotspur | Arsenal | 3–1 | Wembley Stadium (original) |
| 1992 | 1 | Liverpool | Portsmouth | 1–1* | Highbury |
| 1992 | 1 | Liverpool | Portsmouth | 0–0† (Note: 3–1 on penalties) | Villa Park |
| 1992 | 2 | Sunderland | Norwich City | 1–0 | Hillsborough |
| 1993 | 1 | Arsenal | Tottenham Hotspur | 1–0 | Wembley Stadium (original) |
| 1993 | 2 | Sheffield Wednesday | Sheffield United | 2–1* | Wembley Stadium (original) |
| 1994 | 1 | Chelsea | Luton Town | 2–0 | Wembley Stadium (original) |
| 1994 | 2 | Manchester United ‡ | Oldham Athletic | 1–1* | Wembley Stadium (original) |
| 1994 | 2 | Manchester United ‡ | Oldham Athletic | 4–1 | Maine Road |
| 1995 | 1 | Everton | Tottenham Hotspur | 4–1 | Elland Road |
| 1995 | 2 | Manchester United | Crystal Palace | 2–2* | Villa Park |
| 1995 | 2 | Manchester United | Crystal Palace | 2–0 | Villa Park |
| 1996 | 1 | Manchester United ‡ | Chelsea | 2–1 | Villa Park |
| 1996 | 2 | Liverpool | Aston Villa | 3–0 | Old Trafford |
| 1997 | 1 | Chelsea | Wimbledon | 3–0 | Highbury |
| 1997 | 2 | Middlesbrough | Chesterfield | 3–3* | Old Trafford |
| 1997 | 2 | Middlesbrough | Chesterfield | 3–0 | Hillsborough |
| 1998 | 1 | Arsenal ‡ | Wolverhampton Wanderers | 1–0 | Villa Park |
| 1998 | 2 | Newcastle United | Sheffield United | 1–0 | Old Trafford |
| 1999 | 1 | Manchester United # | Arsenal | 0–0* | Villa Park |
| 1999 | 1 | Manchester United # | Arsenal | 2–1* | Villa Park |
| 1999 | 2 | Newcastle United | Tottenham Hotspur | 2–0* | Old Trafford |
| 2000 | 1 | Aston Villa | Bolton Wanderers | 0–0† (Note: 4–1 on penalties) | Wembley Stadium (original) |
| 2000 | 2 | Chelsea | Newcastle United | 2–1 | Wembley Stadium (original) |
| 2001 | 1 | Arsenal | Tottenham Hotspur | 2–1 | Old Trafford |
| 2001 | 2 | Liverpool | Wycombe Wanderers | 2–1 | Villa Park |
| 2002 | 1 | Arsenal ‡ | Middlesbrough | 1–0 | Old Trafford |
| 2002 | 2 | Chelsea | Fulham | 1–0 | Villa Park |
| 2003 | 1 | Arsenal | Sheffield United | 1–0 | Old Trafford |
| 2003 | 2 | Southampton | Watford | 2–1 | Villa Park |
| 2004 | 1 | Manchester United | Arsenal | 1–0 | Villa Park |
| 2004 | 2 | Millwall | Sunderland | 1–0 | Old Trafford |
| 2005 | 1 | Arsenal | Blackburn Rovers | 3–0 | Millennium Stadium |
| 2005 | 2 | Manchester United | Newcastle United | 4–1 | Millennium Stadium |
| 2006 | 1 | Liverpool | Chelsea | 2–1 | Old Trafford |
| 2006 | 2 | West Ham United | Middlesbrough | 1–0 | Villa Park |
| 2007 | 1 | Manchester United | Watford | 4–1 | Villa Park |
| 2007 | 2 | Chelsea | Blackburn Rovers | 2–1* | Old Trafford |
| 2008 | 1 | Portsmouth | West Bromwich Albion | 1–0 | Wembley Stadium (new) |
| 2008 | 2 | Cardiff City | Barnsley | 1–0 | Wembley Stadium (new) |
| 2009 | 1 | Chelsea | Arsenal | 2–1 | Wembley Stadium (new) |
| 2009 | 2 | Everton | Manchester United | 0–0† (Note: 4–2 on penalties) | Wembley Stadium (new) |
| 2010 | 1 | Chelsea ‡ | Aston Villa | 3–0 | Wembley Stadium (new) |
| 2010 | 2 | Portsmouth | Tottenham Hotspur | 2–0* | Wembley Stadium (new) |
| 2011 | 1 | Manchester City | Manchester United | 1–0 | Wembley Stadium (new) |
| 2011 | 2 | Stoke City | Bolton Wanderers | 5–0 | Wembley Stadium (new) |
| 2012 | 1 | Liverpool | Everton | 2–1 | Wembley Stadium (new) |
| 2012 | 2 | Chelsea | Tottenham Hotspur | 5–1 | Wembley Stadium (new) |
| 2013 | 1 | Wigan Athletic | Millwall | 2–0 | Wembley Stadium (new) |
| 2013 | 2 | Manchester City | Chelsea | 2–1 | Wembley Stadium (new) |
| 2014 | 1 | Arsenal | Wigan Athletic | 1–1† | Wembley Stadium (new) |
| 2014 | 2 | Hull City | Sheffield United | 5–3 | Wembley Stadium (new) |
| 2015 | 1 | Arsenal | Reading | 2–1* | Wembley Stadium (new) |
| 2015 | 2 | Aston Villa | Liverpool | 2–1 | Wembley Stadium (new) |
| 2016 | 1 | Manchester United | Everton | 2–1 | Wembley Stadium (new) |
| 2016 | 2 | Crystal Palace | Watford | 2–1 | Wembley Stadium (new) |
| 2017 | 1 | Chelsea | Tottenham Hotspur | 4–2 | Wembley Stadium (new) |
| 2017 | 2 | Arsenal | Manchester City | 2–1* | Wembley Stadium (new) |
| 2018 | 1 | Manchester United | Tottenham Hotspur | 2–1 | Wembley Stadium (new) |
| 2018 | 2 | Chelsea | Southampton | 2–0 | Wembley Stadium (new) |
| 2019 | 1 | Manchester City § | Brighton and Hove Albion | 1–0 | Wembley Stadium (new) |
| 2019 | 2 | Watford | Wolverhampton Wanderers | 3–2* | Wembley Stadium (new) |
| 2020 | 1 | Arsenal | Manchester City | 2–0 | Wembley Stadium (new) |
| 2020 | 2 | Chelsea | Manchester United | 3–1 | Wembley Stadium (new) |
| 2021 | 1 | Chelsea | Manchester City | 1–0 | Wembley Stadium (new) |
| 2021 | 2 | Leicester City | Southampton | 1–0 | Wembley Stadium (new) |
| 2022 | 1 | Liverpool | Manchester City | 3–2 | Wembley Stadium (new) |
| 2022 | 2 | Chelsea | Crystal Palace | 2–0 | Wembley Stadium (new) |
| 2023 | 1 | Manchester City # | Sheffield United | 3–0 | Wembley Stadium (new) |
| 2023 | 2 | Manchester United | Brighton & Hove Albion | 0–0† (Note: 7–6 on penalties) | Wembley Stadium (new) |
| 2024 | 1 | Manchester City | Chelsea | 1–0 | Wembley Stadium (new) |
| 2024 | 2 | Manchester United | Coventry City | 3–3† | Wembley Stadium (new) |
| 2025 | 1 | Crystal Palace | Aston Villa | 3–0 | Wembley Stadium (new) |
| 2025 | 2 | Manchester City | Nottingham Forest | 2–0 | Wembley Stadium (new) |
| 2026 | 1 | Manchester City | Southampton | 2–1 | Wembley Stadium (new) |
| 2026 | 2 | Chelsea | Leeds United | 1–0 | Wembley Stadium (new) |

== Semi-finals table ==
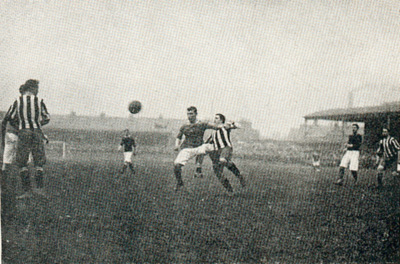
Playing in their first semi-final, Woolwich Arsenal (in dark shirts) faced Newcastle United (in striped shirts) at the Victoria Ground, Stoke in 1906.

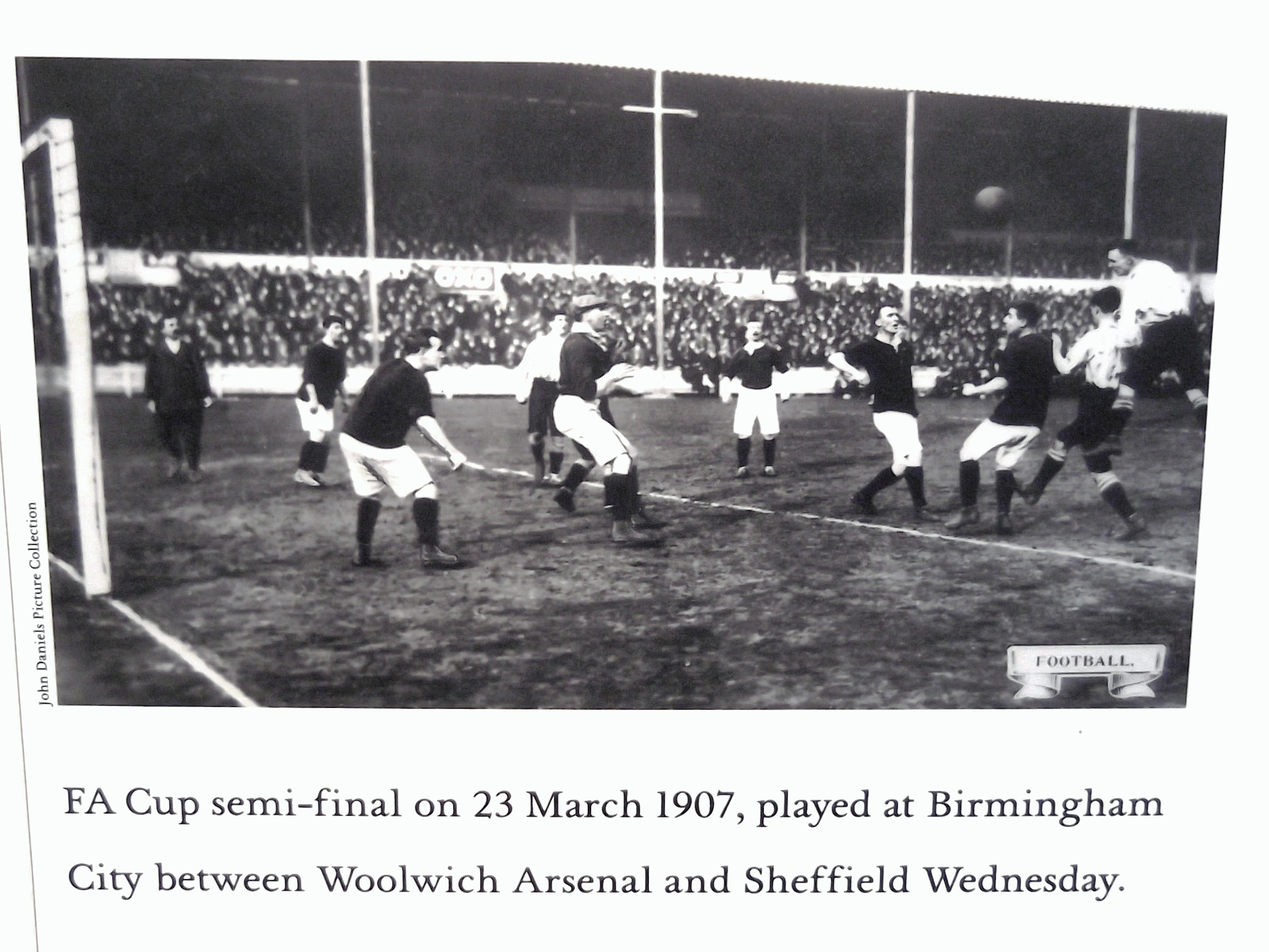
Woolwich Arsenal versus The Wednesday at St Andrew's in 1907. The Arsenal would drop "Woolwich" from their name in 1914; The Wednesday would add "Sheffield" in 1929.

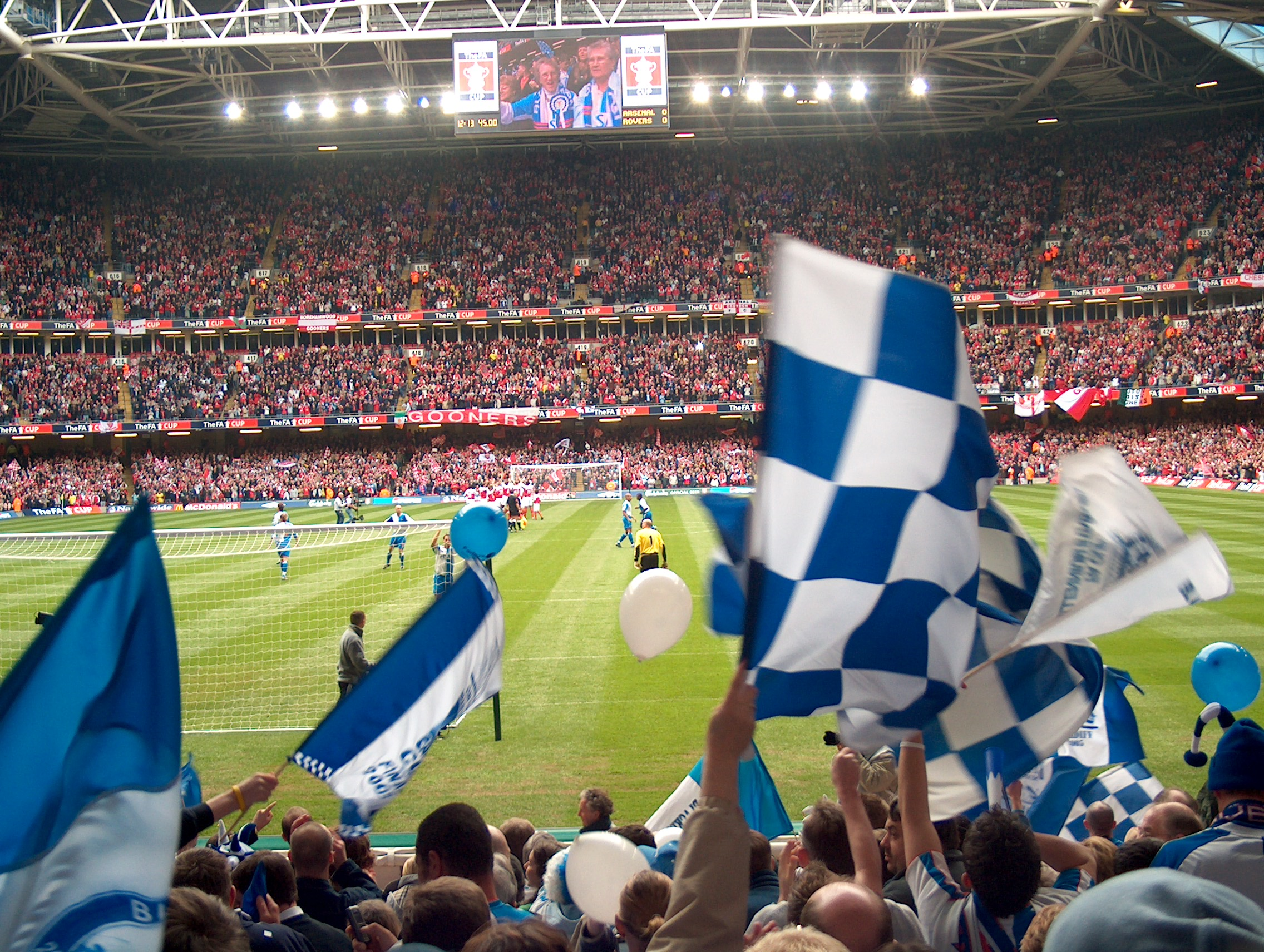
Arsenal against Blackburn Rovers was one of the 2005 semi-finals held at the Millennium Stadium in Cardiff, taking the fixture out of England for the first time since 1885.

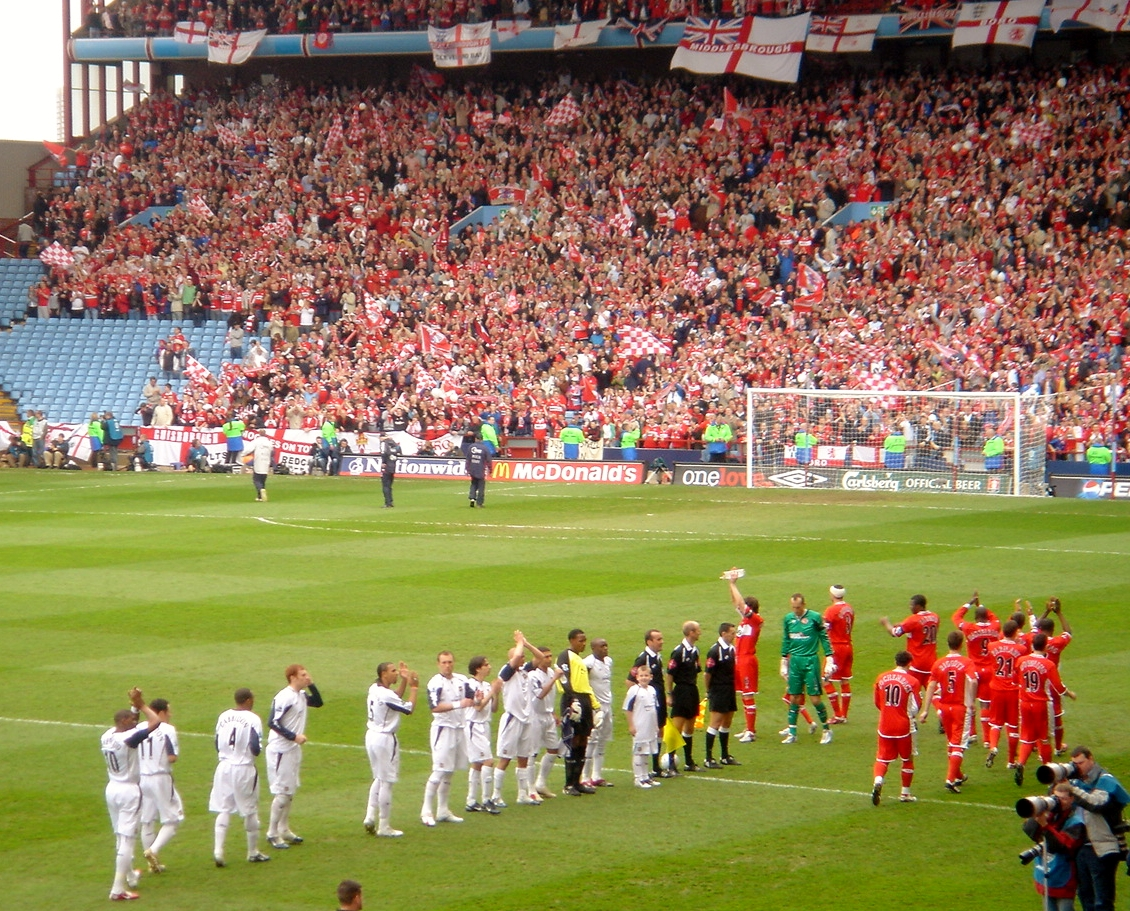
The pre-match line-ups at Villa Park for Middlesbrough versus West Ham United, 2006

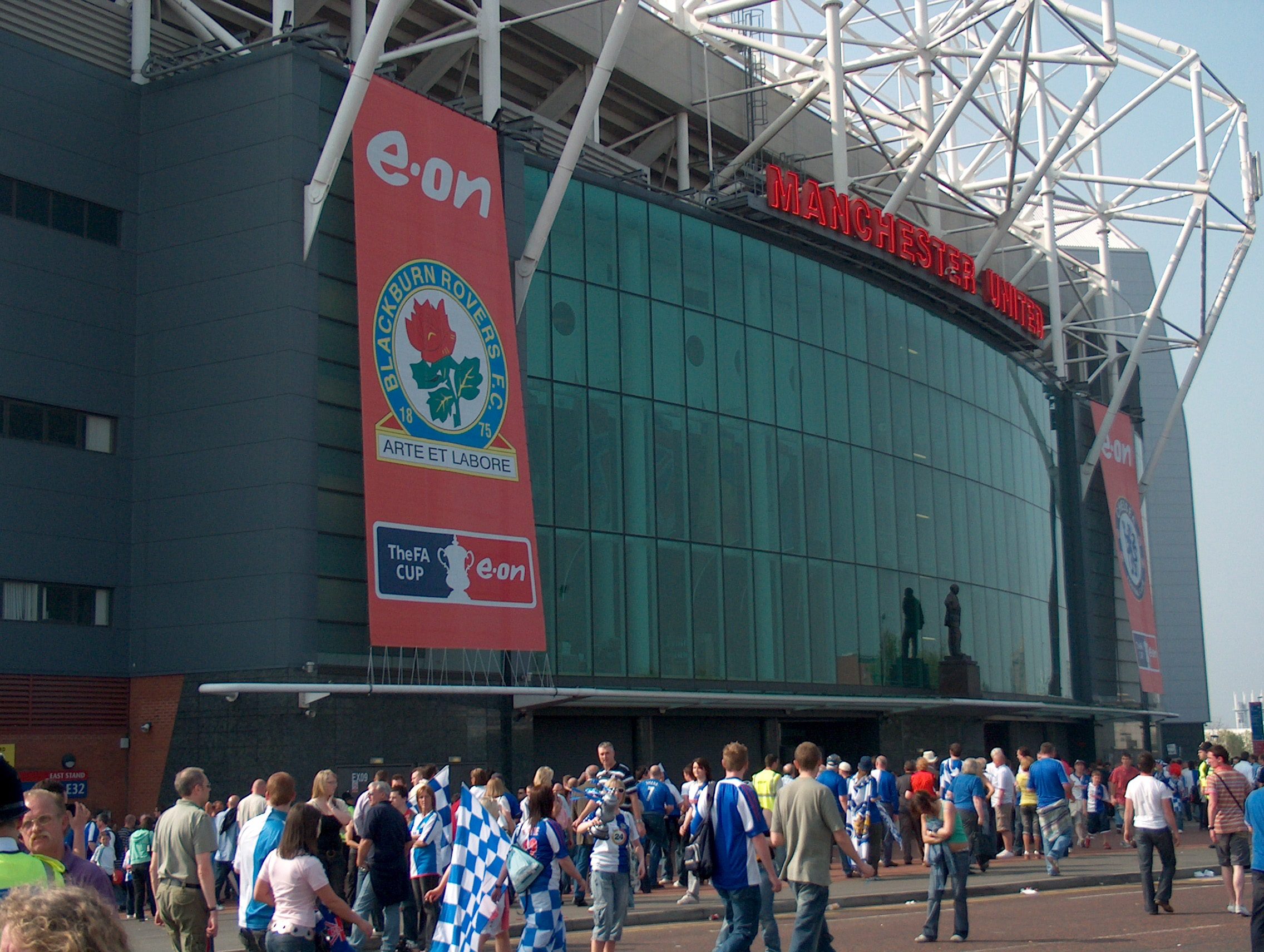
Blackburn Rovers v Chelsea at Old Trafford in 2007: the last FA Cup semi-final before the event was moved to the new Wembley Stadium.

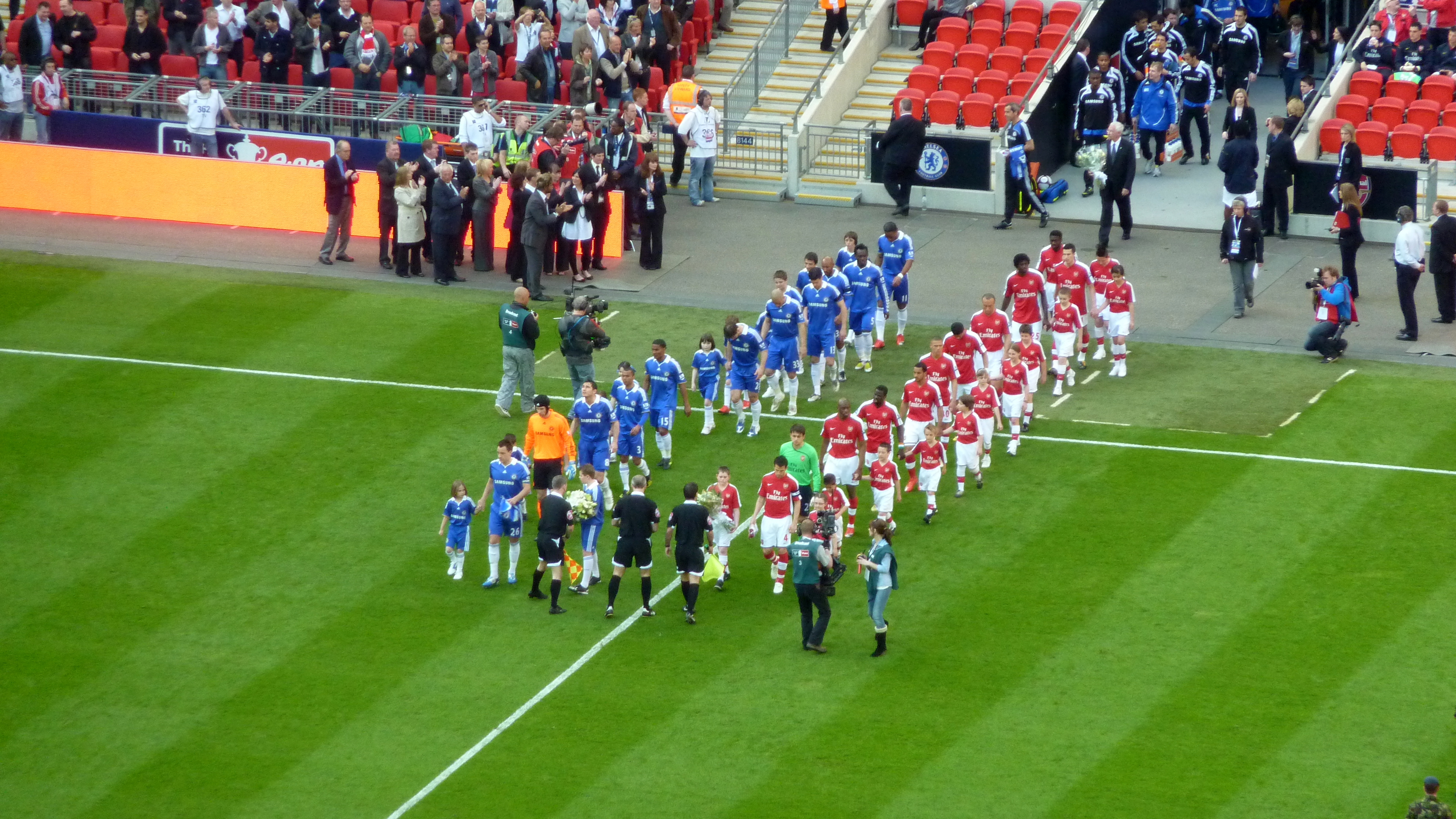
Arsenal versus Chelsea in 2009 was one of several London derbies held at the national stadium

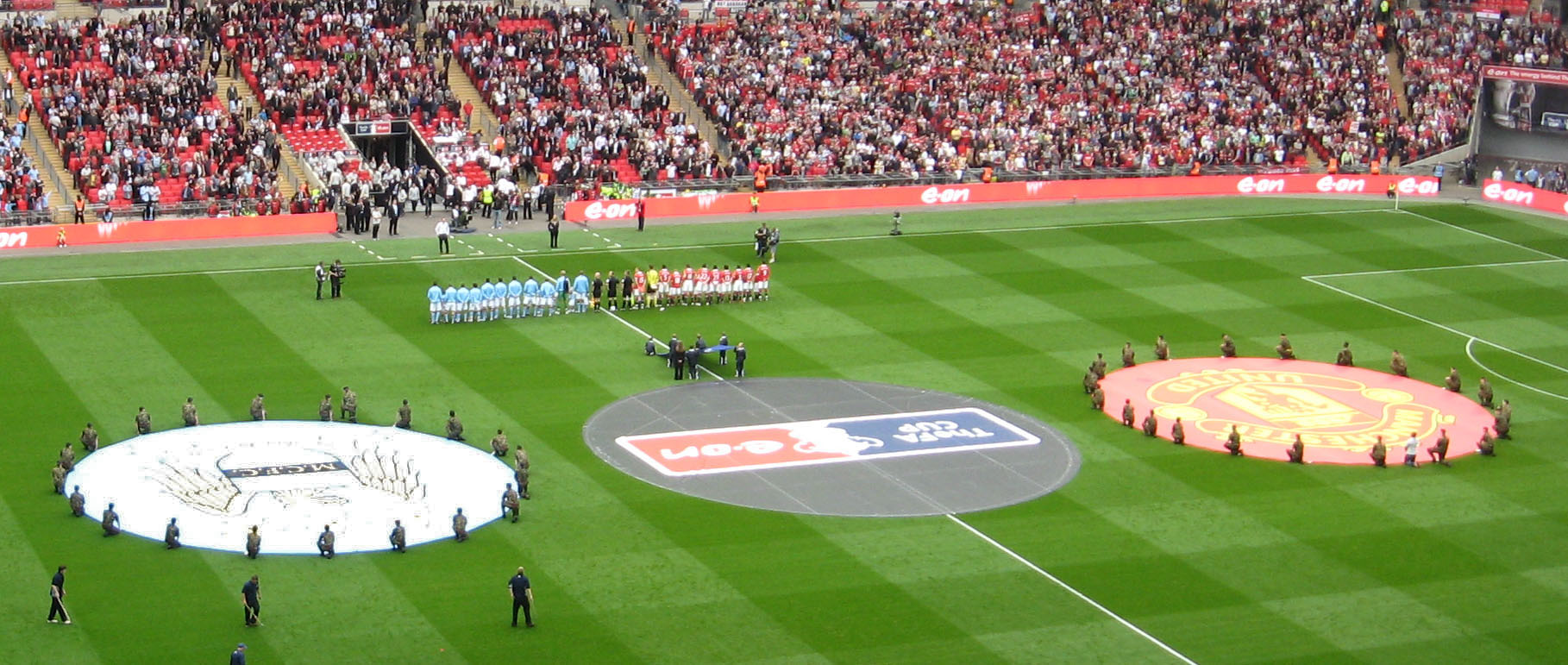
Manchester clubs City and United have reached the FA Cup semi-final a combined 45 times. The Manchester derby has twice been a semi-final.

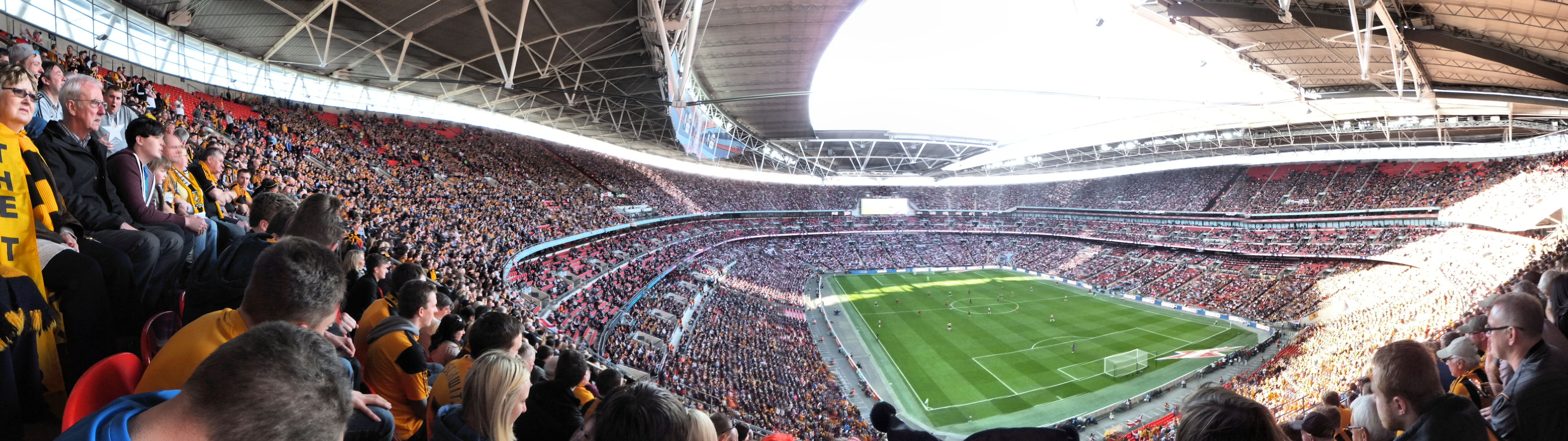
In amongst Hull City fans at the 2014 all-Yorkshire semi-final against Sheffield United

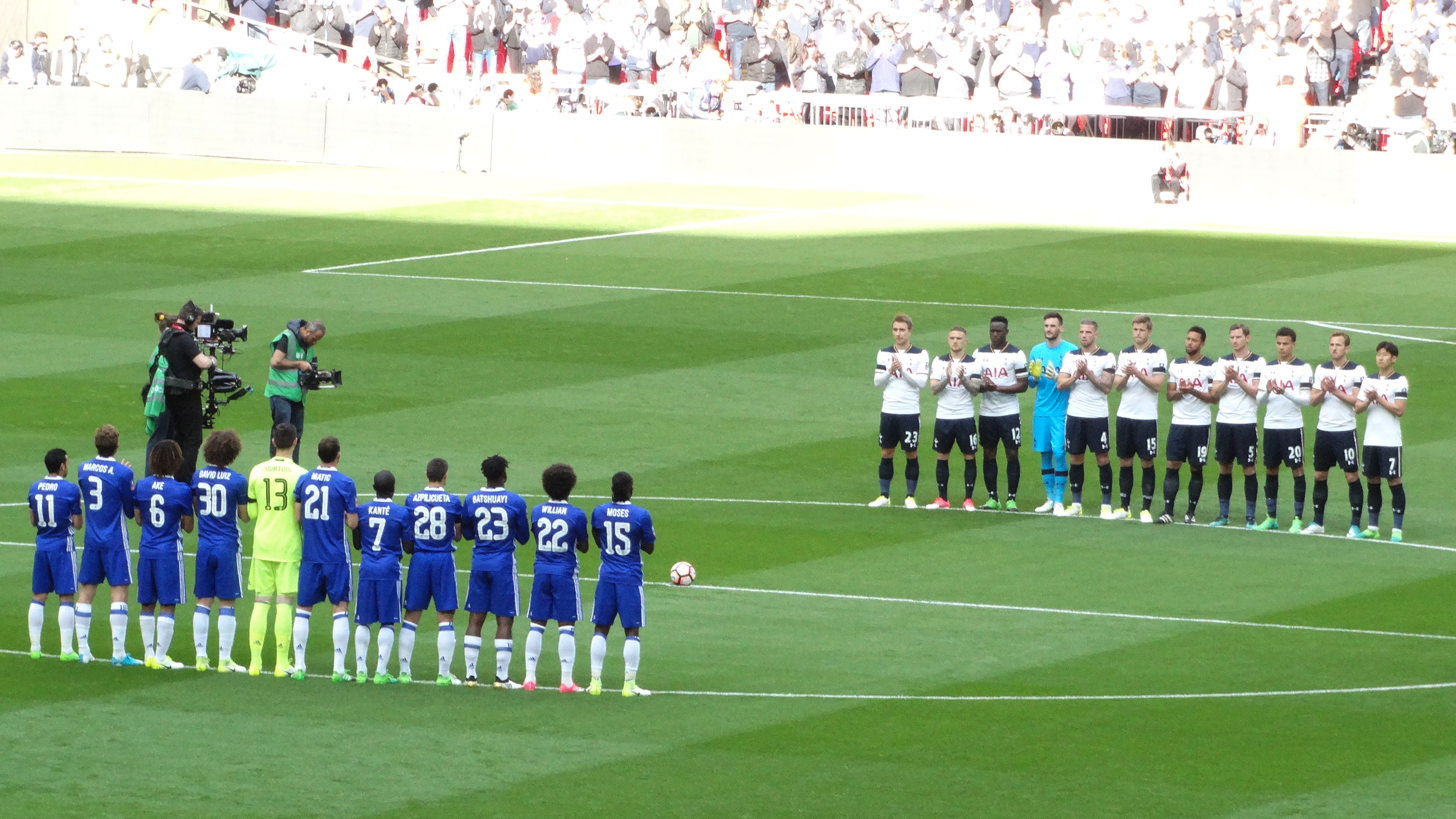
Chelsea and Tottenham Hotspur's rivalry dates back to the 1967 FA Cup final, and the clubs met again in the 2017 semi-final.

Teams shown with an asterisk beside their name are no longer in existence. This table is updated as of the 2025–26 FA Cup.

| Team | Appearances | Won | Lost |
|---|---|---|---|
| Arsenal | 30 | 21 | 9 |
| Aston Villa | 22 | 11 | 11 |
| Barnsley | 3 | 2 | 1 |
| Birmingham City | 9 | 2 | 7 |
| Blackburn Olympic | 2 | 1 | 1 |
| Blackburn Rovers | 18 | 8 | 10 |
| Blackpool | 3 | 3 | 0 |
| Bolton Wanderers | 14 | 7 | 7 |
| Bradford City | 1 | 1 | 0 |
| Brighton & Hove Albion | 3 | 1 | 2 |
| Bristol City | 2 | 1 | 1 |
| Burnley | 8 | 3 | 5 |
| Bury (Note: Bury has reformed as a phoenix club since their last appearance in a semi-final.) | 2 | 2 | 0 |
| Cambridge University | 1 | 0 | 1 |
| Cardiff City (Note: Welsh team) | 4 | 3 | 1 |
| Charlton Athletic | 2 | 2 | 0 |
| Chelsea | 28 | 17 | 11 |
| Chesterfield | 1 | 0 | 1 |
| Clapham Rovers* | 1 | 0 | 1 |
| Coventry City | 2 | 1 | 1 |
| Crewe Alexandra | 1 | 0 | 1 |
| Crystal Palace (1861)* | 1 | 0 | 1 |
| Crystal Palace (1905) | 6 | 3 | 3 |
| Darwen | 1 | 0 | 1 |
| Derby County | 13 | 4 | 9 |
| Derby Junction* | 1 | 0 | 1 |
| Everton | 26 | 13 | 13 |
| Fulham | 6 | 1 | 5 |
| Grimsby Town | 2 | 0 | 2 |
| Huddersfield Town | 7 | 5 | 2 |
| Hull City | 2 | 1 | 1 |
| Ipswich Town | 3 | 1 | 2 |
| Leeds United | 9 | 4 | 5 |
| Leicester City | 8 | 5 | 3 |
| Orient | 1 | 0 | 1 |
| Liverpool | 25 | 15 | 10 |
| Luton Town | 4 | 1 | 3 |
| Manchester City | 21 | 15 | 6 |
| Manchester United | 32 | 22 | 10 |
| Marlow | 1 | 0 | 1 |
| Middlesbrough | 3 | 1 | 2 |
| Millwall | 5 | 1 | 4 |
| Newcastle United | 17 | 13 | 4 |
| Norwich City | 3 | 0 | 3 |
| Nottingham Forest | 13 | 3 | 10 |
| Notts County | 5 | 2 | 3 |
| Old Carthusians | 3 | 1 | 2 |
| Old Etonians | 5 | 5 | 0 |
| Old Harrovians | 1 | 0 | 1 |
| Oldham Athletic | 3 | 0 | 3 |
| Oxford University | 5 | 3 | 2 |
| Plymouth Argyle | 1 | 0 | 1 |
| Port Vale | 1 | 0 | 1 |
| Portsmouth | 7 | 5 | 2 |
| Preston North End | 10 | 7 | 3 |
| Queen's Park (Note: Scottish team that was invited to compete) | 3 | 2 | 1 |
| Queens Park Rangers | 1 | 1 | 0 |
| Rangers | 1 | 0 | 1 |
| Reading | 2 | 0 | 2 |
| Royal Engineers | 4 | 4 | 0 |
| Sheffield United | 15 | 6 | 9 |
| Sheffield Wednesday | 16 | 6 | 10 |
| Shropshire Wanderers* | 1 | 0 | 1 |
| Southampton | 14 | 4 | 10 |
| Stoke City | 4 | 1 | 3 |
| Sunderland | 12 | 4 | 8 |
| Swansea City | 2 | 0 | 2 |
| Swifts* | 3 | 0 | 3 |
| Swindon Town | 2 | 0 | 2 |
| Tottenham Hotspur | 21 | 9 | 12 |
| Wanderers* | 3 | 3 | 0 |
| Watford | 8 | 3 | 5 |
| West Bromwich Albion | 20 | 10 | 10 |
| West Ham United | 7 | 5 | 2 |
| Wigan Athletic | 2 | 1 | 1 |
| Wimbledon (Note: Wimbledon FC was dissolved, the team relocating as Milton Keynes Dons in 2004. A phoenix club, AFC Wimbledon has formed since their last appearance in a semi-final.) | 2 | 1 | 1 |
| Wolverhampton Wanderers | 15 | 8 | 7 |
| Wycombe Wanderers | 1 | 0 | 1 |
| York City | 1 | 0 | 1 |

== Venues ==
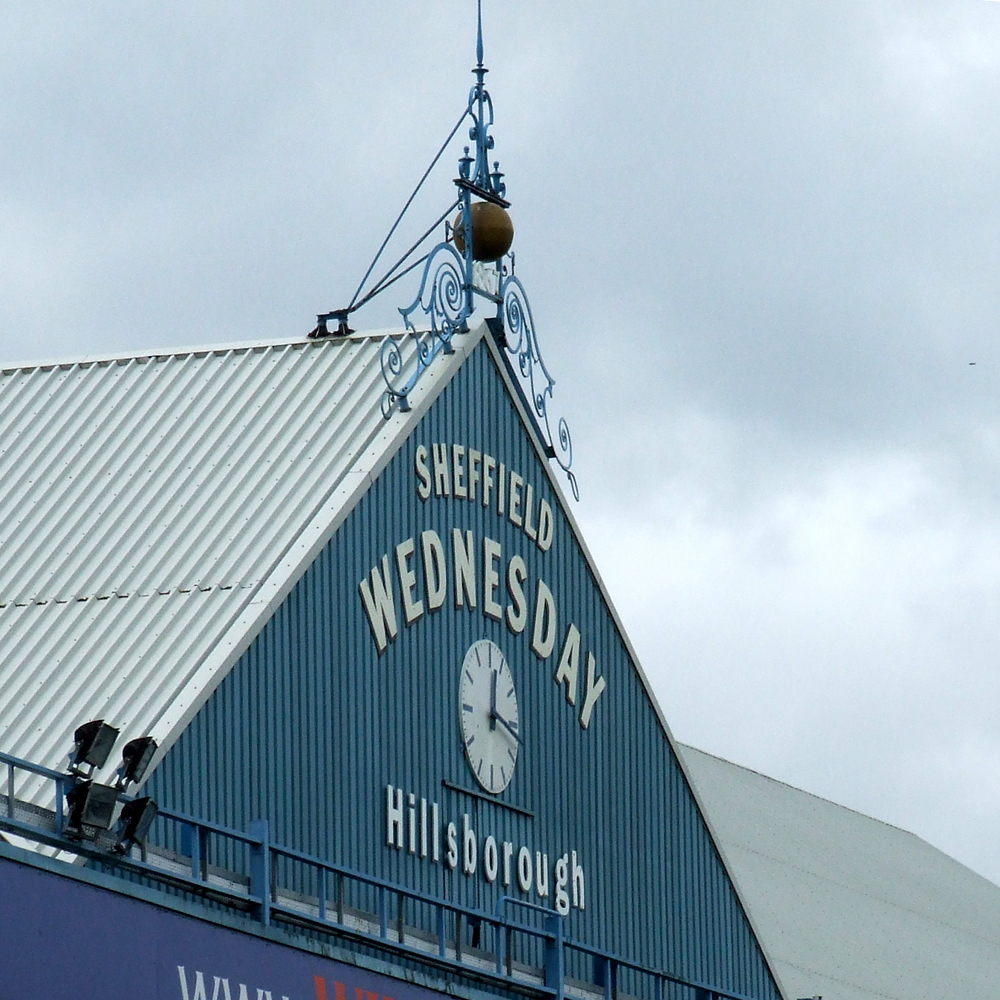
Semi-finals were held at Sheffield Wednesday's home ground Hillsborough for 85 years.

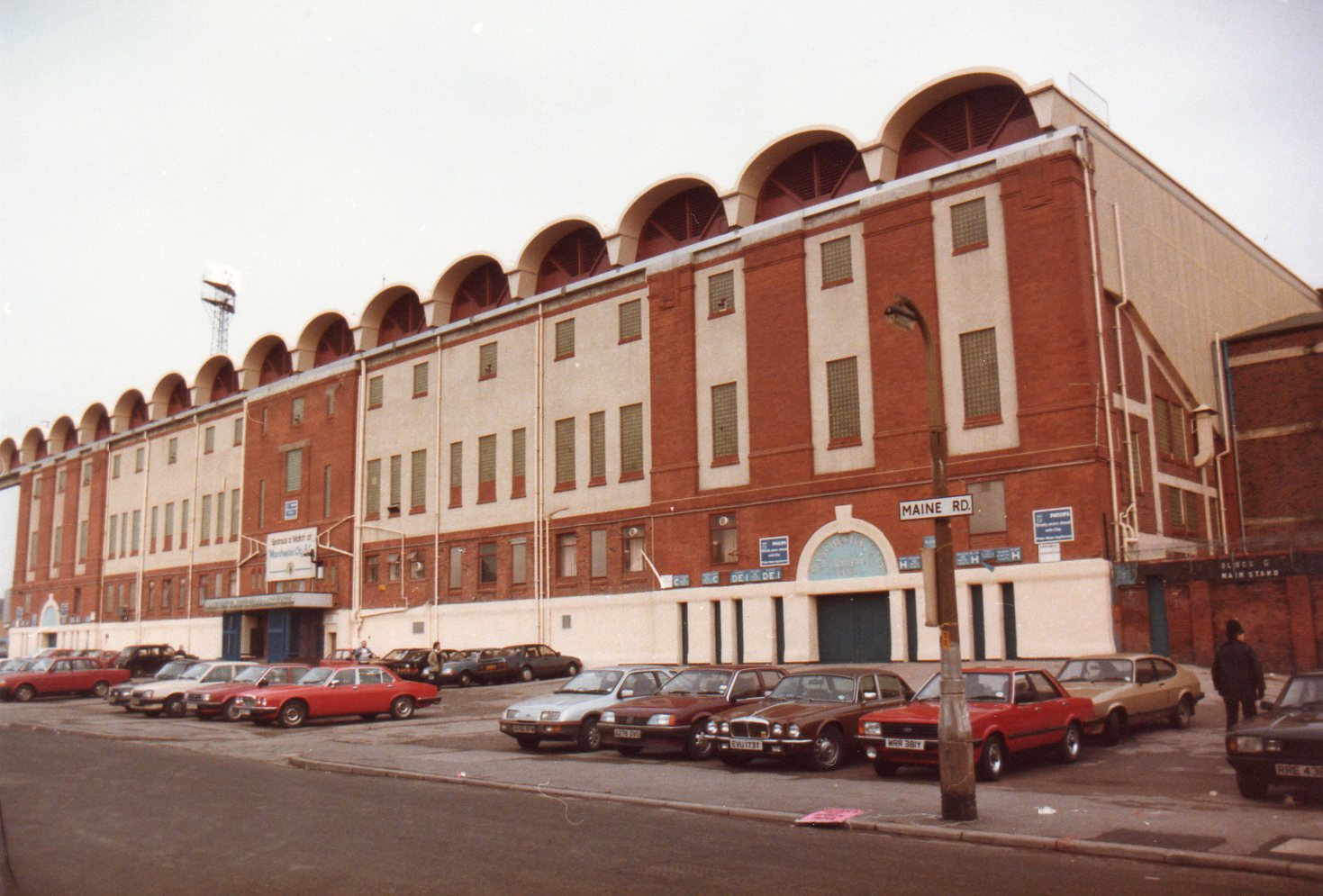
Maine Road (1985 image), dubbed the Wembley of the North, was used for semi-finals between 1928 and 1994.

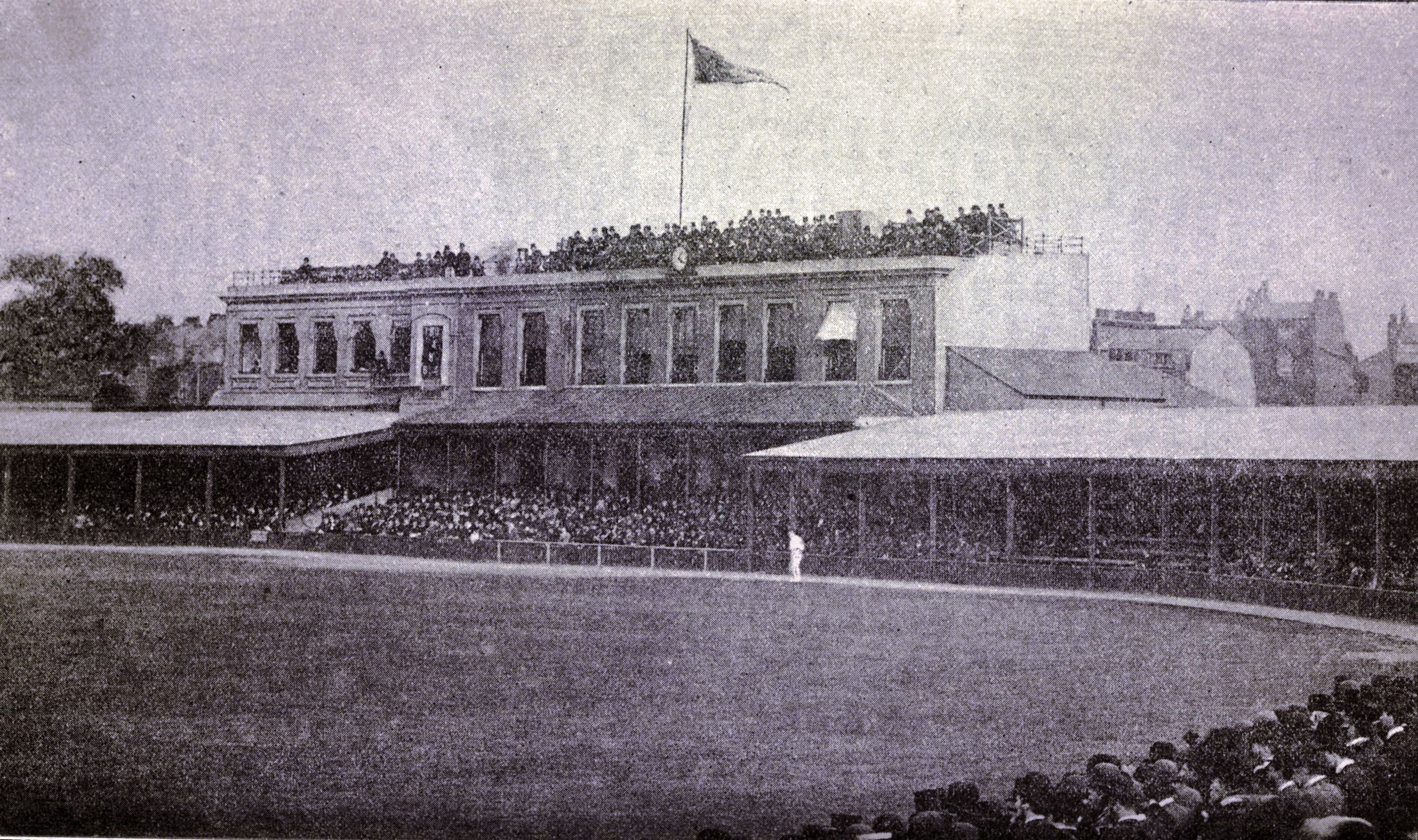
In the 19th century, seventeen FA Cup semi-final matches were held at the Kennington Oval (1891 image).

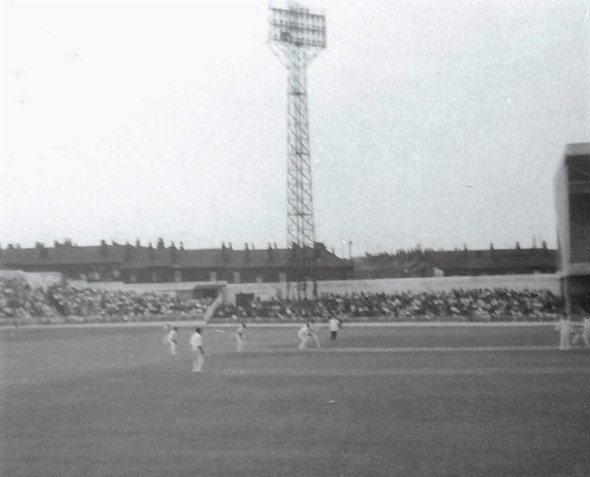
Bramall Lane (1965 photo) hosted 17 semi-finals from 1889 to 1938; Sheffield has been host city on 51 occasions.

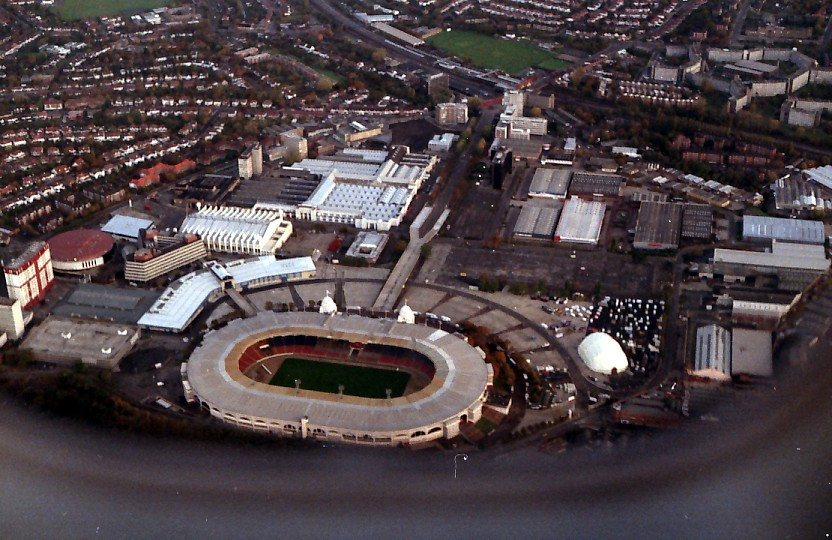
The original Wembley Stadium began hosting semi-finals in 1991 with the North London derby.

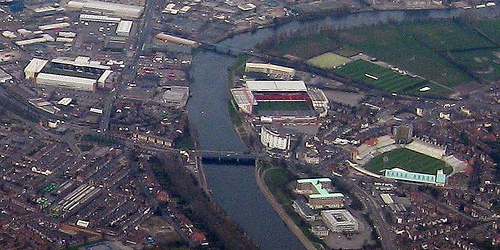
Three semi-final venues in Nottingham: Meadow Lane, the City Ground and Trent Bridge. A fourth venue, the Town Ground, was located at the bottom left of the image.

| * | Venue no longer exists |
| † | Venue no longer hosts regular football |

| Stadium | City | SF matches | Year of first SF | Most recent SF |
|---|---|---|---|---|
| Kennington Oval† | London | 17 | 1872 | 1883 |
| Fartown Ground* | Huddersfield | 1 | 1882 | 1882 |
| Whalley Range* | Manchester | 2 | 1882 | 1883 |
| Trent Bridge† | West Bridgford | 3 | 1884 | 1887 |
| Racecourse Ground† | Derby | 5 | 1885 | 1890 |
| Merchiston Castle School† | Edinburgh, Scotland (Note: Venue in nation other than England or Wales) | 1 | 1885 | 1885 |
| Alexandra Recreation Ground* | Crewe | 3 | 1887 | 1889 |
| Anfield | Liverpool | 5 | 1888 | 1929 |
| Victoria Ground* | Stoke-on-Trent | 7 | 1897 | 1935 |
| Wellington Road* | Perry Barr | 2 | 1890 | 1896 |
| Bramall Lane | Sheffield | 17 | 1889 | 1938 |
| Molineux | Wolverhampton | 10 | 1892 | 1957 |
| Ewood Park | Blackburn | 6 | 1893 | 1947 |
| Town Ground* | Nottingham | 2 | 1893 | 1896 |
| Fallowfield Stadium* | Manchester | 2 | 1894 | 1899 |
| Goodison Park | Liverpool | 10 | 1896 | 1985 |
| Crystal Palace† | London | 2 | 1898 | 1900 |
| Burnden Park* | Bolton | 4 | 1899 | 1970 |
| Baseball Ground* | Derby | 2 | 1899 | 1901 |
| Elm Park* | Reading | 1 | 1900 | 1900 |
| Villa Park | Birmingham | 57 | 1884 | 2007 |
| City Ground | West Bridgford | 6 | 1899 | 1965 |
| The Hawthorns | West Bromwich | 2 | 1902 | 1960 |
| White Hart Lane* | London | 12 | 1902 | 1988 |
| Hyde Road* | Manchester | 1 | 1905 | 1905 |
| St Andrew's | Birmingham | 9 | 1907 | 1961 |
| Stamford Bridge | London | 10 | 1910 | 1978 |
| Elland Road | Leeds | 10 | 1910 | 1995 |
| Old Trafford | Manchester | 22 | 1910 | 2007 |
| Meadow Lane | Nottingham | 2 | 1912 | 1925 |
| Hillsborough | Sheffield | 34 | 1912 | 1997 |
| Turf Moor | Burnley | 1 | 1922 | 1922 |
| Filbert Street* | Leicester | 2 | 1928 | 1962 |
| Maine Road* | Manchester | 18 | 1928 | 1994 |
| Highbury* | London | 12 | 1929 | 1997 |
| Leeds Road* | Huddersfield | 6 | 1932 | 1951 |
| Roker Park* | Sunderland | 1 | 1955 | 1955 |
| Highfield Road* | Coventry | 1 | 1980 | 1980 |
| Wembley (1923)* | London | 7 | 1991 | 2000 |
| Millennium Stadium | Cardiff, Wales (Note: Venue in Wales) | 2 | 2005 | 2005 |
| Wembley (2007) | London | 38 | 2008 | 2026 |

== Third-fourth place matches ==
The FA Cup Third-fourth place matches were played to determine the order of third and fourth place in the FA Cup. They were introduced in 1970 replacing the traditional pre-final match between England and "Young England." Players on both teams received commemorative tankards. The third-fourth place matches were generally unpopular, with only the first one in 1970 getting some positive attention as an occasion, and they were abandoned after five seasons. The 1972 and 1973 third-fourth place matches were played at the start of the following season, and the 1974 third-fourth place match was played five days after the final. The 1972 third-fourth place match was the first FA Cup match to be decided on penalties. The five third-fourth place FA Cup matches were:

| Season | Date | Winner | Score | Loser | Venue | Attendance |
|---|---|---|---|---|---|---|
| 1969–70 | 10 April 1970 | Manchester United | 2–0 | Watford | Highbury | 15,105 |
| 1970–71 | 7 May 1971 | Stoke City | 3–2 | Everton | Selhurst Park | 5,031 |
| 1971–72 | 5 August 1972 | Birmingham City | 0–0 (4–3 pen.) | Stoke City | St Andrew's | 25,841 |
| 1972–73 | 18 August 1973 | Wolverhampton Wanderers | 3–1 | Arsenal | Highbury | 21,038 |
| 1973–74 | 9 May 1974 | Burnley | 1–0 | Leicester City | Filbert Street | 6,458 |

== See also ==
- Hillsborough Disaster
- List of FA Cup finals
- FA Cup final
- FA Cup
