= List of Scottish football clubs in the FA Cup =

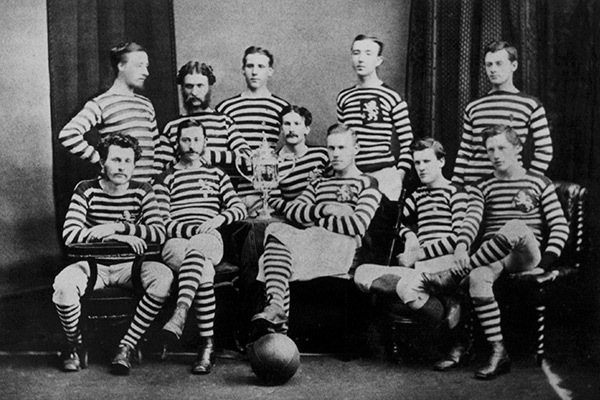
Queen's Park reached two FA Cup finals, the only Scottish team ever to do so.

The Football Association Challenge Cup, commonly known as the FA Cup, is a knockout competition in English association football. It is the oldest football competition in the world, having commenced in 1871. The Cup is organised by The Football Association, the governing body of the sport in England, and is open only to clubs playing in FA-affiliated leagues in the modern era, all of which are based in England, although a number of Welsh clubs have taken part. Several teams from Scotland have also entered, primarily in the competition's early years.

The first Scottish club to enter was Queen's Park in Glasgow, who accepted an invitation to take part in the first competition after a number of the clubs which had originally entered withdrew. Queen's Park was by far the dominant force in Scottish football, and no other team had even managed to score a goal against them. Because of a combination of byes and the withdrawal of opponents, "Queen's" reached the semi-finals without playing a match, but after holding Wanderers to a draw the Scottish club was forced to withdraw, as the funds could not be raised to return for a replay. The following season Queen's Park entered the competition again and, to reduce the travelling expenses required to take part in a competition in which virtually every other team was based in the home counties surrounding London, were afforded byes all the way to the semi-finals. At that stage the club was drawn against Oxford University, but the Scots withdrew from the competition, although one account states that Queen's in fact beat Oxford, but then withdrew as the team could not afford to travel to London for the final. In 1873, the newly formed Scottish Football Association launched the Scottish Cup, but Queen's Park continued to enter the FA Cup draw, although for unknown reasons the club withdrew each time without playing.

In 1883, Queen's returned to the FA Cup and reached the final, scoring resounding wins over Crewe Alexandra (10–0) and Manchester F.C. (15–0) en route, only to be defeated by Blackburn Rovers. The match against Manchester was the first FA Cup tie to be staged in Scotland, hosted at Titwood, the home of Clydesdale Cricket Club. A year later Queens met Blackburn Rovers in the final once again, but Rovers won again. The 1885–86 competition saw the first entries by other Scottish clubs, as Queen's were joined by Partick Thistle, Third Lanark, Rangers and Heart of Midlothian; but Rangers and Hearts withdrew without playing a match. These clubs all returned for the 1886–87 competition, along with newcomers Renton and Cowlairs.

In 1887, the Scottish Football Association banned its members from taking any further part in the FA Cup. No more Scottish clubs participated until Gretna F.C. entered the competition in the 1980s. Because the town of Gretna is close to the border, the local football club had opted to play in the English football league system and by the 1980s had reached the Northern Premier League, making the team eligible to enter the FA Cup. Gretna played in the qualifying rounds of the FA Cup for nineteen seasons, and reached the first round proper twice, until the club joined the Scottish Football League in 2002.

== Participation of Scottish clubs by season ==
Season	Club	Round reached	Notes	Ref
1871–72	Queen's Park	Semi-finals	Reached the semi-finals without playing a match, held Wanderers to a draw, but withdrew rather than play a replay	
1872–73	Queen's Park	Semi-finals	Received byes to the semi-finals but either withdrew immediately or beat Oxford University and then withdrew	
1876–77	Queen's Park	3rd round	Received byes to 3rd round but then withdrew	
1879–80	Queen's Park	1st round	Withdrew without playing a match	
1880–81	Queen's Park	1st round	Withdrew without playing a match	
1881–82	Queen's Park	1st round	Withdrew without playing a match	
1882–83	Queen's Park	1st round	Withdrew without playing a match	
1883–84	Queen's Park	Final	Defeated in the final by Blackburn Rovers	
1884–85	Queen's Park	Final	Defeated in the final by Blackburn Rovers	
1885–86	Queen's Park	2nd round	Reached 2nd round but withdrew	
1885–86	Third Lanark	2nd round	Reached 2nd round but withdrew	
1885–86	Partick Thistle	1st round		
1885–86	Heart of Midlothian	1st round	Withdrew without playing a match	
1885–86	Rangers	1st round	Withdrew without playing a match	
1886–87	Rangers	Semi-finals		
1886–87	Partick Thistle	5th round		
1886–87	Cowlairs	3rd round		
1886–87	Renton	3rd round	Defeated holders Blackburn Rovers in 2nd round	
1886–87	Third Lanark	2nd round		
1886–87	Heart of Midlothian	1st round		
1886–87	Queen's Park	1st round		
1983–84	Gretna	2nd qualifying round		
1984–85	Gretna	3rd qualifying round		
1985–86	Gretna	3rd qualifying round		
1986–87	Gretna	4th qualifying round		
1987–88	Gretna	2nd qualifying round		
1988–89	Gretna	2nd qualifying round		
1989–90	Gretna	1st qualifying round		
1990–91	Gretna	3rd qualifying round		
1991–92	Gretna	1st round		
1992–93	Gretna	1st qualifying round		
1993–94	Gretna	1st round	The most recent appearance of a Scottish team in the FA Cup proper	
1994–95	Gretna	1st qualifying round		
1995–96	Gretna	Preliminary round		
1996–97	Gretna	1st qualifying round		
1997–98	Gretna	3rd qualifying round		
1998–99	Gretna	1st qualifying round		
1999–00	Gretna	2nd qualifying round		
2000–01	Gretna	Preliminary round		
2001–02	Gretna	2nd qualifying round		
2002–03	Gretna	1st qualifying round	Withdrew without playing a match following entry into the Scottish League, allowing them to compete in the Scottish Cup	

== See also ==
- Berwick Rangers F.C. - a club geographically located in England, but which plays in the Scottish league system (and thus the Scottish Cup)
- Non-English football clubs in the FA Cup - a full list of all clubs from outside England that have competed in the FA Cup
