= Non-English football clubs in the FA Cup =

The Football Association Challenge Cup, commonly known as the FA Cup, is a knockout competition in English association football. It is the oldest football competition in the world, having commenced in 1871.

Although the competition is the national cup of England, numerous clubs from outside England have participated in the tournament, with some still doing so as of 2016.

Scottish clubs competed from the tournament's inauguration until 1887, while clubs from Ireland, in what is now Northern Ireland, competed from 1887 until 1891.

All clubs from Wales were eligible for the FA Cup until the formation of the League of Wales in 1992. Since then only clubs remaining in the English football pyramid have competed. In 1927 Cardiff City won the tournament making them the only non English team to win the competition. Prior to this, the tournament was often referred to as the 'English Cup', but use of the term died out after Cardiff's win.

Teams from the Channel Islands have competed in the qualifying rounds in recent years.

== Guernsey ==
Although St. Martins and Vale Recreation have competed in the FA Vase, Guernsey FC are the only club from the Bailiwick of Guernsey to have competed in the FA Cup. Formed in 2011, they first entered the competition in 2013, reaching the 2nd qualifying round. Under FA rules, Guernsey must play any home replay at a neutral English venue – as of 2015, they had played six games in the competition – four away and two 'home' replays in England.

Although sides from Isle of Man and Jersey had competed in the FA Vase, Guernsey FC remained the only club from the crown dependencies to have played in the FA Cup until Jersey Bulls in 2021. The football associations of each crown dependency has County Football Association status within the Football Association.

Club	Years	Best performance	Ref
Guernsey	2013–14 to 2016–17	2nd qualifying round – 2013–14	

== Ireland ==
Between 1887–88 and 1890–91, six Irish clubs entered the FA Cup. In 1887, Distillery became the first club from Ireland to enter the competition. Cliftonville and Linfield Athletic were the last clubs from the island to appear, both competing in 1890–91. Cliftonville progressed further in the competition than any other Irish club, reaching the 3rd round in 1886–87 before crashing out 11–0 to Partick Thistle. Following the introduction of qualifying rounds, Linfield Athletic progressed through the most rounds of any Irish club, winning three ties in 1888–89 to reach the first round proper. Linfield's 7–0 victory over Cliftonville during the 1888–89 fourth qualifying round is notable for being the only FA Cup match ever to be played on Christmas Day.

All six clubs were located in what is now Northern Ireland. However, the entire island of Ireland was still a part of the United Kingdom at the time, as Northern Ireland was not created until the partition of Ireland in 1921.

Club	Years	Best performance	Ref
Belfast YMCA	1888–89 & 1889–90	3rd qualifying round – 1889–90	
Cliftonville	1886–87 to 1890–91	3rd round – 1886–87	
Distillery	1887–88 & 1889–90	2nd round – 1887–88	
Linfield Athletic	1888–89 to 1890–91	1st round – 1888–89	
North End Athletic	1889–90	2nd qualifying round – 1889–90	
Ulster	1888–89	2nd qualifying round – 1888–89	

== Jersey ==
Jersey Bulls are the only club from the Bailiwick of Jersey to have competed in the FA Cup. Formed in 2018, they first entered the competition in 2021, reaching the 3rd qualifying round.

Although a team from the Isle of Man and several other Channel Island teams have competed in the FA Vase, Jersey Bulls and Guernsey FC are the only two clubs from the crown dependencies to have played in the FA Cup. The football associations of each crown dependency has County Football Association status within the Football Association.

Club	Years	Best performance	Ref
Jersey Bulls	2021–22 & 2023–24	3rd qualifying round – 2021–22	

== Scotland ==
The first Scottish club to enter was Queen's Park, who accepted an invitation to take part in the very first competition after a number of the clubs which had originally entered withdrew. The Glasgow team were by far the dominant force in Scottish football, and no other team had even managed to score a goal against them. Because of a combination of byes and the withdrawal of opponents, "Queen's" reached the semi-finals without playing a match, but after holding Wanderers to a draw the Scottish club was forced to withdraw as the funds could not be raised to return for a replay. The following season Queen's entered the competition again and, to ease the travelling expenses required to take part in a competition in which virtually every other team was based in the home counties, were afforded byes all the way to the semi-finals. At this stage the club was drawn against Oxford University, whereupon the Scots withdrew from the competition, although one account states that Queen's in fact beat Oxford only to then withdraw as the team could not afford to travel to London for the final. In 1873, the newly formed Scottish Football Association launched the Scottish Cup, but Queen's Park continued to enter the FA Cup draw, although for unknown reasons the club withdrew each time without playing.

In 1883, Queen's returned to the FA Cup and reached the final, scoring resounding wins over Crewe Alexandra (10–0) and Manchester F.C. (15–0) en route, only to be defeated by Blackburn Rovers. The match against Manchester was the first FA Cup tie to be staged in Scotland, hosted at Titwood, the home of Clydesdale CC. A year later Queens met Blackburn Rovers in the final once again, with the English team again emerging victorious. The 1885–86 competition saw the first participation by other Scottish clubs, as Queen's were joined by Partick Thistle, Third Lanark, Rangers and Heart of Midlothian, although the latter two withdrew without playing a match. These clubs all returned for the 1886–87 competition, along with newcomers Renton and Cowlairs.

In 1887, the Scottish Football Association banned its members from taking any further part in the FA Cup. No more Scottish clubs participated until Gretna F.C. entered the competition in the 1980s. Because the town of Gretna is located extremely close to the border, the local football club had opted to play in the English football league system and by the 1980s had reached the Northern Premier League, making the team eligible to enter the FA Cup. Gretna played in the qualifying rounds of the FA Cup for nineteen seasons, making the first round proper twice, until the club joined the Scottish Football League in 2002.

Club	Years	Best performance	Ref
Cowlairs	1886–87	3rd round – 1886–87	
Gretna	1983–84 to 2001–02	1st round – 1991–92 and 1993–94	
Heart of Midlothian	1886–87	1st round – 1886–87	
Partick Thistle	1885–86 to 1886–87	5th Round – 1886–87	
Queen's Park	1871–72 to 1872–73 & 1883–84 to 1886–87	Final – 1883–84 and 1884–85	
Rangers	1886–87	Semi-final – 1886–87	
Renton	1886–87	3rd round – 1886–87	
Third Lanark	1885–86 to 1886–87	2nd Round – 1885–86 and 1886–87	

== Wales ==
Until the founding of the League of Wales in 1992, most senior Welsh sides were included within the English league system, and could therefore be eligible for entry into the FA Cup. Since that time, all but a handful of Welsh teams have joined the Welsh league system and are no longer eligible.

In 1927 Cardiff defeated holders Bolton on their way to the final, where they defeated Arsenal 1–0, making them the first, and as yet only, non-English team to win the FA Cup. The event was the first FA Cup final broadcast live on radio by the BBC.

Club	Years	Best performance	Ref
Aberaman & Aberdare	1945–46 to 1947–48	1st qualifying round – 1945–46, 1946–47	
Aberaman Athletic	1902–03, 1920–21 to 1921–22 & 1935–36 to 1938–39	3rd qualifying round – 1902–03	
Aberaman United	1921–22	Extra preliminary round – 1921–22	
Abercarn	1921–22	Extra preliminary round – 1921–22	
Aberdare Amateurs	1919–20	Extra preliminary round – 1919–20	
Aberdare Athletic	1912–13 to 1913–14 & 1920–21 to 1928–29	3rd round – 1925–26	
Abergavenny Thursdays	1963–64 to 1971–72	2nd qualifying round – 1968–69, 1969–70, 1971–72	
Aberystwyth Town	1896–97 to 1900–01 & 1909–10	4th qualifying round – 1897–98	
Abertillery	1914–15 to 1921–22	2nd qualifying round – 1920–21	
Ammanford Town	1976–77	1st qualifying round – 1976–77	
Bangor City	1896–97 to 1898–99, 1924–25 to 1985–86 & 1987–88 to 1991–92	2nd round – 1960–61, 1969–70, 1972–73, 1983–84	
Bargoed	1914–15 to 1921–22	1st qualifying round – 1914–15, 1919–20	
Barry Town	1911–12 to 1991–92	2nd round – 1929–30	
Bedouins	1931–32 & 1933–34 to 1935–36	Extra preliminary round – 1931–32, 1933–34, 1934–35, 1935–36,	
Bethesda Athletic	1969–70 & 1974–75 to 1976–77	2nd qualifying round – 1969–70, 1974–75, 1976–77	
Blackwood Town	1921–22	Extra preliminary round – 1921–22	
Blaenau Ffestiniog Amateur	1972–73 to 1974–75	1st qualifying round – 1972–73, 1973–74, 1974–75	
Borough United	1962–63 to 1966–67	3rd qualifying round – 1962–63, 1964–65, 1965–66	
Bridgend Town	1921–22 & 1973–74 to 1991–92	4th qualifying round – 1979–80	
Buckley	1896–97 to 1897–98	3rd qualifying round – 1896–97	
Buckley United	1920–21 to 1921–22	4th qualifying round – 1920–21	
Buckley Victoria	1900–01	1st qualifying round – 1900–01	
Caerau Rovers	1914–15 to 1921–22	Preliminary round – 1919–20, 1920–21	
Caerleon Athletic	1913–14 to 1914–15	1st qualifying round – 1913–14	
Caernarfon Town	1979–80 to 1995–96	3rd round – 1986–87	
Caernarvon Athletic	1929–30 to 1930–31	2nd round – 1929–30	
Caernarvon Wanderers	1886–87	1st round – 1886–87	
Caerphilly	1902–03, 1913–14 & 1921–22	2nd qualifying round – 1902–03	
Cardiff Albion	1920–21	Preliminary round – 1920–21	
Cardiff City	1910–11 to present	Winners – 1926–27	
Cardiff Corinthians	1911–12 to 1949–50	3rd qualifying round – 1922–23	
Chirk	1884–85 to 1888–89, 1890–91, 1897–98 to 1898–99, 1900–01 to 1902–03, 1904–05 to 1907–08, 1909–10 & 1922–23 to 1924–25	5th round – 1886–87	
Colwyn Bay	1927–28 to 1937–38, 1965–66 to 1966–67 & 1979–80 to 2018–19	2nd round – 1995–96	
Connah's Quay	1909–10 to 1914–15	2nd qualifying round – 1909–10	
Connah's Quay & Shotton	1921–22 & 1926–27 to 1931–32	3rd qualifying round – 1926–27	
Connah's Quay Nomads	1971–72 to 1973–74	2nd qualifying round – 1971–72, 1973–74	
Cross Keys	1921–22	Extra preliminary round – 1921–22	
Cwmbran Town	1988–89 to 1991–92	2nd qualifying round – 1989–90	
Denbigh Town	1910–11	Preliminary round – 1910–11	
Druids	1876–77 to 1877–78, 1882–83 to 1887–88, 1889–90 to 1890–91, 1895–96 to 1900–01, 1904–05 & 1906–07 to 1910–11	5th round – 1882–83	
Ebbw Vale	1919–20 to 1923–24 & 1929–30 to 1962–63	3rd qualifying round – 1952–53	
Ferndale Athletic	1972–73	1st qualifying round – 1972–73	
Flint Town United	1892–93 to 1894–95, 1928–29 & 1950–51 to 1961–62	3rd qualifying round – 1894–95, 1952–53, 1954–55	
Gilfach	1921–22	Extra preliminary round – 1921–22	
Gresford	1921–22	Preliminary round – 1921–22	
Haverfordwest County	1981–82 to 1984–85	3rd qualifying round – 1981–82	
Holyhead Town	1964–65 to 1965–66, 1967–68 to 1968–69 & 1970–71	2nd qualifying round – 1967–68	
Llandudno	1914–15, 1923–24 to 1952–53, 1954–55 to 1964–65 & 1966–67	3rd qualifying round – 1929–30, 1958–59	
Llandudno Swifts	1896–97 to 1897–98 & 1899–1900 to 1900–01	2nd qualifying round – 1899–1900	
Llanelli	1911–12 to 1913–14, 1919–20 to 1924–25 & 1931–32 to 1987–88	2nd round – 1952–53	
Llanhilleth	1921–22	Preliminary round – 1921–22	
Lovells Athletic	1921–22 & 1921–22 to 1968–69	3rd round – 1945–46	
Lysaghts Excelsior	1912–13 to 1913–14	Preliminary round – 1912–13, 1913–14	
Machynlleth	1921–22	Extra preliminary round – 1921–22	
Maesteg Park	1985–86 to 1991–92	2nd qualifying round – 1988–89, 1991–92	
Mardy	1910–11 to 1914–15 & 1921–22	3rd qualifying round – 1921–22	
Merthyr Town [1]	1910–11 to 1934–35	2nd round – 1928–29	
Merthyr Town [2]	2010–11 to present	3rd qualifying round – 2012–13	
Merthyr Tydfil	1946–47 to 2009–10	2nd round – 1946–47, 1954–55, 1973–74, 1979–80, 1989–90, 1990–91	
Mid Rhondda	1913–14 to 1921–22 & 1925–26	5th qualifying round – 1921–22	
Milford Town	1911–12 & 1913–14 to 1914–15	1st qualifying round – 1914–15	
Mold	1925–26 to 1926–27	1st round – 1925–26	
Mond Nickel Works	1913–14 to 1914–15	Preliminary round – 1913–14, 1914–15	
Monmouth Town	1937–38 to 1945–46	2nd qualifying round – 1945–46	
New Tredegar	1921–22	Extra preliminary round – 1921–22	
Newport (Monmouth)	1906–07	2nd qualifying round – 1906–07	
Newport County [1]	1913–14 to 1930–31 & 1932–33 to 1988–89	5th round – 1948–49	
Newport County [2]	1992–93 to present	5th round – 2018–19	
Newport Barbarians	1914–15 to 1921–22	1st qualifying round – 1919–20	
Newtown	1884–85 to 1885–86, 1891–92 to 1899–1900 & 1990–91 to 1991–92	2nd round – 1884–85, 1885–86	
Oakdale	1920–21 to 1921–22	Extra preliminary round – 1920–21, 1921–22	
Pembroke Dock	1913–14 to 1914–15 & 1921–22	Preliminary round – 1913–14, 1914–15, 1921–22	
Pontypridd	1912–13 to 1913–14 & 1919–20 to 1925–26	4th qualifying round – 1924–25	
Port Talbot Town	1912–13 to 1914–15	Preliminary round – 1912–13, 1913–14, 1914–15	
Porth Athletic	1921–22 to 1922–23	2nd qualifying round – 1921–22	
Porthmadog	1967–68 to 1980–81	3rd qualifying round – 1973–74	
Pwllheli & District	1953–54 to 1963–64, 1967–68 to 1971–72 & 1975–76	4th qualifying round – 1954–55	
Rhiwderin	1914–15 to 1919–20 & 1921–22	Preliminary round – 1914–15, 1919–20	
Rhosllanerchrugog	1890–91 to 1892–93	2nd qualifying round – 1890–91	
Rhyl	1898–99, 1900–01, 1902–03, 1904–05 to 1909–10, 1911–12, 1923–24, 1925–26 to 1933–34 & 1935–36 to 1991–92	4th round – 1956–57	
Rhymney Town	1914–15 & 1921–22	2nd qualifying round – 1914–15	
Risca Stars	1921–22	Extra preliminary round – 1921–22	
Rogerstone	1919–20 to 1921–22	Preliminary round – 1919–20, 1920–21, 1921–22	
Swansea City	1913–14 to present	Semi-final – 1925–26, 1963–64	
Ton Pentre	1909–10, 1919–20 to 1922–23 & 1968–69 to 1991–92	1st round – 1986–87	
Treherbert	1921–22	Preliminary round – 1921–22	
Troedyrhiw	1948–49 to 1953–54	1st qualifying round – 1948–49, 1949–50, 1950–51, 1951–52, 1952–53, 1953–54	
Troedyrhiw Stars	1914–15	Preliminary round – 1914–15	
Vale of Llangollen	1887–88 to 1888–89	1st round – 1887–88	
Welshpool Town	1898–99, 1900–01, 1902–03 & 1904–05 to 1908–09	3rd qualifying round – 1900–01	
Wrexham	1883–84 to present	6th round – 1973–74, 1977–78 & 1996–97	
