= Tom Reece =

English billiards player (1873–1953)

- Tom Reece playing an anchor stroke at English billiards, from his 1928 book "Cannons and Big Guns"
- Born: 12 August 1873; Oldham, Lancashire
- Died: 16 October 1953 (aged 80); Lancing, Sussex
- Highest break: 901
- Best ranking finish: Six-times runner-up, World Billiards Championship

Tom Reece (12 August 1873 – 16 October 1953) was an English professional player of English billiards. He was six times runner-up in the professional billiards championship, now regarded as the world championship, losing three times to Melbourne Inman in finals from 1912 to 1914, and three times to Tom Newman in the 1921, 1924 and 1925 finals. He made the unofficial world's highest billiards break of 499,135 in 1907 using a cradle cannon technique shortly before it was banned from the sport. In 1927, his prowess with the pendulum stroke led to that also being banned from use in competition.

His highest officially-recognised break was 901, which he compiled in 1916. He authored two books, Dainty Billiards: How to play the close cannon game (1925), and his autobiography Cannons and Big Guns (1928). Reece died on 16 October 1953, a week after suffering a stroke.

== Early life ==
Reece was born in Oldham on 12 August 1873. In his teenage years he worked in a cotton mill. He used to visit a gymnasium to train for swimming and at the age of 16 started playing billiards on the gymnasium's table. After becoming a professional player, he had taken part in around forty money matches for stakes by March 1902, losing only about six. Reece accompanied Annette Kellermann on a section of her unsuccessful attempt to swim across the English Channel in 1905, being the only one of several supporters who was able to keep pace with her, and had ambitions to swim the channel himself.

== Early billiards career and record break ==
In January 1907, Walter Lovejoy introduced the cradle cannon (also known as an anchor cannon) to the British game, in a match against Cecil Harverson, making a break of 603 points, which included 284 consecutive cradle cannons.

In a cradle cannon sequence, the two object balls are played into a position near a corner pocket where the cue ball can be successively played for a cannon off them so that they remain in the same position at the conclusion for the next shot. This technique was quickly taken up by a number of other professional players, including Reece, who made a break of 1,825 in February, and another of 4,593 in March. A match of 150,000 up was arranged between Reece and Joe Chapman, with the intention of allowing a record break to be made. Reece compiled an unfinished break of 40,001, with the match being abandoned. An official record for a cradle cannon break was set at 42,746, by William Cook on 4 June 1907. Meanwhile, the Billiard Association had signalled that the cradle cannon would no longer be permitted in the game after the end of the playing season.

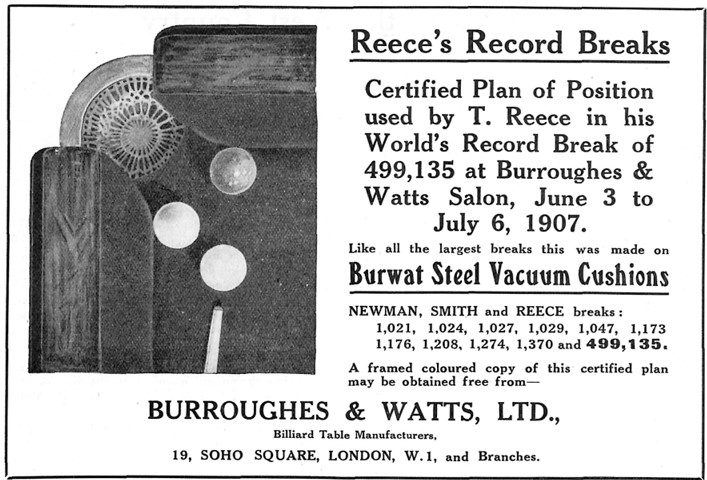
Advertisement featuring the balls in the position for Tom Reece's record English billiards break

In a match held from 3 June to 6 July 1907, Reece scored a record break of 499,135 points using a cradle cannon system, although it was not an officially recognised record, as the public and press were not in attendance throughout. His opponent was Chapman, who received a start of 50,000 and scored 926 before Reece commenced his break. Reece managed to get the balls in position for cradle cannons after scoring 825 points, and was in play for 85 hours and 49 minutes for his break, averaging 97 points a minute. As billiards is a turn-based sport, Chapman did not get to play any shots during this time. During the match, at Burroughes Hall, Reece made 249,552 cradle cannons during his break. The Billiards Association decided at a meeting on 2 September 1907 to ban the cradle cannon, although as no consensus on the definition of a cradle cannon was reached, the responsibility to determine whether a player was playing cradle cannons was passed to match referees. The president of the Association, Sydenham Dixon, said during the meeting that "the stroke had been mastered by certain professionals and persisted in to an extent that made it farcical". The world record break under the current rules is 1,346 by Peter Gilchrist. The following year, Reece won the billiards competition of the 1908 American Tournament at Burroughes Hall.

The Billiards Control Club was established in 1908 as a rival to the Billiards Association and using a different set of rules, the main differences from the Association version being a simpler explanation of penalties and the stipulation that a player could not legally make more than two miss shots successively. Melbourne Inman, the Association champion, and Reece, each entered the Control Club Championship in 1910, along with H. W. Stevenson, who had been declared the Control Club champion in February 1909. Inman defeated Reece 9,000–5,103 in the preliminary round.

In 1912, with Stevenson not participating, Inman and Reece played for the professional billiards title. Inman recorded a decisive 18,000–9,675 win over Reece in a match that The Sporting Life described as "the most spiritless affair ever witnessed on a billiard table" because it was so one-sided. Inman defeated Reece for the title again in 1913, 18,000–16,627; and in 1914, 18,000–12,826.

Reece next played in a match to decide the professional title in 1921. There were six participants in the tournament, with Inman and Willie Smith deciding not to play because of a disagreement with the organisers over the venue. Tom Newman defeated Reece 16,000–10,744 in the final. In 1922, Reece lost by 711 to Claude Falkiner in the semi-final after having led by 1,441. There were three entries for the 1924 tournament, which Newman won with a 16,000–14,845 victory over Reece in the final. Reece entered the 1925 tournament because he expected Inman to, but Newman was the only other entrant, and he recorded a 16,000–10,092 win over Reece.

== Later professional career ==
In the 1927 championship, against Inman, Reece played a series of pendulum cannons, where the object balls are trapped at the jaws of the pocket for successive cannons. One difference between this and the cradle method is that the player must walk around the corner of the table for each successive shot. The rules at the time specified that a maximum of 25 consecutive cannons could be made without the cue ball striking a cushion. Reece scored 568 consecutive cannons which prompted the Billiards Association and Control Club to prohibit the pendulum cannon in the rules.

He played in one professional snooker tournament, the 1946 World Snooker Championship, retiring from the match when 2–8 behind to Kingsley Kennerley. He said that snooker was "a splendid game for navvies in their lunch hour, the sort of game you play in corduroys and clogs".

In conversation with George Nelson of the Yorkshire Evening Post, reported in the paper in 1941, Reece spoke about his record break. He recounted that here had been a tradition that the company that manufactured the billiard table on which a record break was compiled on would pay £100 to the player making the break. Following a rise in the use of the cradle cannon following Lovejoy's employment of the method in 1907, the record was frequently increasing, which meant more expense for table manufacturers. He says that the manufacturing firm Burroughes and Watts told him that they would only pay out for a break "the size of which will stop all further attempts at records", to which he replied that he would need an opponent and a venue for a month. The company then arranged for the match of 500,000 up between Reece and Chapman at their Burroughes Hall. He also said that as the balls were not moved, he was careful about not overusing chalk, as the table could not have been cleaned, and made the last 400,000 points without chalking his cue.

Sidney Felsted wrote in The Badminton Magazine of Sports and Pastimes in 1913 that "there is no more player in the world to watch more attractive than Reece making a run of nurseries" but added that "it would be idle to compare him with some of the great all-round players." Snooker historian Clive Everton described Reece's playing style as "temperamental, artistic with a taste for close, delicate control", and the opposite of Inman's "open" style. An editorial in The Billiard Player soon after Reece's death said that "his name is associated with the highest artistry ... and nobody can ever mention great billiards without mentioning Tom Reece."

Reece's book Dainty Billiards: How to play the close cannon game was published by C. Arthur Pearson in 1925. His memoir, Cannons and Big Guns, was published by Hutchinson & Co. in 1928. Reese claimed in the latter book to have sometimes played billiards with Guglielmo Marconi, before the latter became well known. Reece's highest officially recognised break was 901, which he compiled in 1916. Joyce Gardner, winner of multiple Women's Professional Billiards Championships, wrote that it was "entirely due" to Reece's support and encouragement that she decided to become a professional player.

Reece married Laura Lydia Williams on the morning of 6 June 1908, before continuing a match against John Roberts Jr that afternoon. During World War II he toured the United Kingdom playing exhibition matches to raise funds for the British Red Cross.

He died on 16 October 1953, a week after suffering a stroke, and was cremated at Golders Green Crematorium on 20 October.

== Professional Championship Finals ==
These professional tournaments are now recognised as equivalent to World Billiards Championships events.

=== Billiard Control Club Championship finals ===
The Billiard Control Club was established in 1908 as a rival to the Billiard Association and organised a separate championship.

Date	Winner	Score	Runner-up	Score	Refs.
March 1912	(England) Melbourne Inman	18,000	(England) Tom Reece	9,675
March 1913	(England) Melbourne Inman	18,000	(England) Tom Reece	16,627
March 1914	(England) Melbourne Inman	18,000	(England) Tom Reece	12,826

=== Billiards Association and Control Club Championship finals ===
After the 1919 final, the Billiard Association and the Billiard Control Club amalgamated and, as the Billiards Association and Control Club (later renamed as the Billiards Association and Control Council) organised an annual championship tournament.

Date	Winner	Score	Runner-up	Score	Refs.
March 1921	(England) Tom Newman	16,000	(England) Tom Reece	10,744
May 1924	(England) Tom Newman	16,000	(England) Tom Reece	14,845
April 1925	(England) Tom Newman	16,000	(England) Tom Reece	10,092

=== Snooker Titles: (1) ===
- 1911 Australian Championship
