= 1870 in cue sports =

The year of 1870 included challenge matches in the table-top cue sports of pool disciplines and English billiards.

== Pool ==
The following notable challenge matches took place in 1870.

Date(s)	Tournament	Location	Result	Refs.
9 January 1870	Champion Cue of the United States	USA (New York City)	John Deery defeated Cyrille Dion, 1,500–1,492	
1 June 1870	Diamond Championship of America	USA (New York City)	A. R. Rudolphe defeated Cyrille Dion, 1,500–1,485	
17 June 1870	Diamond Championship of America	USA (New York City)	Cyrille Dion defeated A. R. Rudolphe, 1,500–1,479	
29 December 1870	Championship of America	USA (New York City)	Cyrille Dion defeated A. R. Rudolphe, 2,001–1,592	

== English billiards ==
A number of matches took place on a challenge basis which are recognised as the equivalent of the world professional championship of billiards.

Date(s)	Tournament	Location	Result	Refs.
February 1870	The Professional Championship of English billiards	UK (London)	William Cook defeated John Roberts Sr., 1,200–1,083	
April 1870	The Professional Championship of English billiards	UK (London)	John Roberts Jr. defeated William Cook, 1,000–522	
May 1870	The Professional Championship of English billiards	UK (London)	John Roberts Jr. defeated Alfred Bowles, 1,000–752	
November 1870	The Professional Championship of English billiards	UK (London)	Joseph Bennett defeated John Roberts Jr., 1,000–905	
