= World Billiards Championship (English billiards) =

Professional sports tournament

Pankaj Advani with the World Billiards Championship Trophy in 2026

The World Billiards Championship (also known as the World Professional Billiards Championship) is an international cue sports tournament in the discipline of English billiards, organised by World Billiards, a subsidiary of the World Professional Billiards and Snooker Association (WPBSA). In its various forms, and usually as a single competition, the title is one of the oldest sporting world championships, having been contested (though irregularly) since 1870.

From 2012 to 2014 there were separate timed and points divisions, with the tournament held in association with the International Billiards and Snooker Federation. In those years, there was no separate IBSF World Billiards Championship.

The tournament has been played annually most years since 1980. The event was known as the World Professional Billiards Championship until 2010. In addition, the World Ladies Billiards Championship has been played since 1931 (with interruptions) and organized by World Ladies Billiards and Snooker since 1998. The 2026 champion was Pankaj Advani.

== Early championships ==
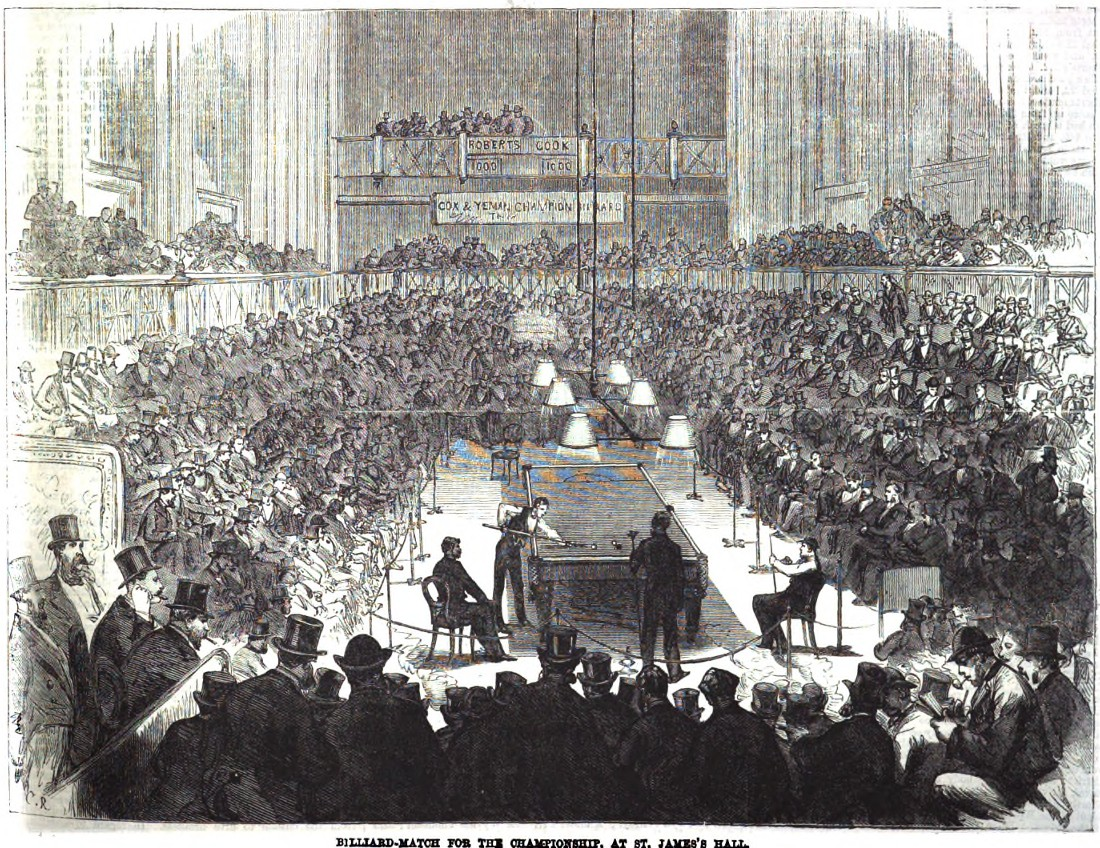
The February 1870 match at St James's Hall, London, from The Illustrated London News

Before the introduction of formal championships in English billiards, "champions" were recognised by public acclaim, usually based on their performances in money matches. After Jack Carr's defeat of Jerry Flanagan, who was known as "the Cork Marker", for a stake of 75 Guineas, Carr's backers issued a challenge that Carr would play anyone for a stake of 100 sovereigns. Edwin "Jonathan" Kentfield accepted the challenge, and assumed the title after Carr was too ill to play. He would remain unchallenged for 24 years.

John Roberts Sr., who had spent years touring and establishing his reputation as a billiards player, challenged Kentfield in 1849. Kentfield declined to play, so Roberts styled himself as champion, a title he held unchallenged until 1870, when he lost to William Cook.

William Cook challenged Roberts Sr. for the title in the Autumn of 1869. As this was the first actual match for the Championship, a group of players and representatives from three billiard table manufacturers drew up a special set of rules for the game. Roberts managed to have the pocket width reduced to 3 inches (from the original 3 5/8 inches), and the "D" and spots were adjusted so that Cook's spot stroke strength, derived from his proficiency at consecutively potting the red ball from its spot, was weakened. Cook was nonetheless considered the favourite. The match started at 8:27 p.m. on 11 February 1870 and concluded at 1:38 a.m the following morning as Cook reached the target of 1,200 points. The match at St. James's Hall in London was attended by Edward VII, the Prince of Wales. There were a further ten matches for the trophy by December 1875, In April 1876 Cook was awarded the title when reigning champion John Roberts Jr., who had won the title five times, failed to accept five-time Champion Cook's challenge because of his planned tour of Australia. The pair played in May 1877, when Roberts prevailed, after which Cook claimed the title in 1878 when Roberts did not formally accept his challenge. Cook resigned the title a month later and travelled to join Roberts on tour in India.

== Association championships ==
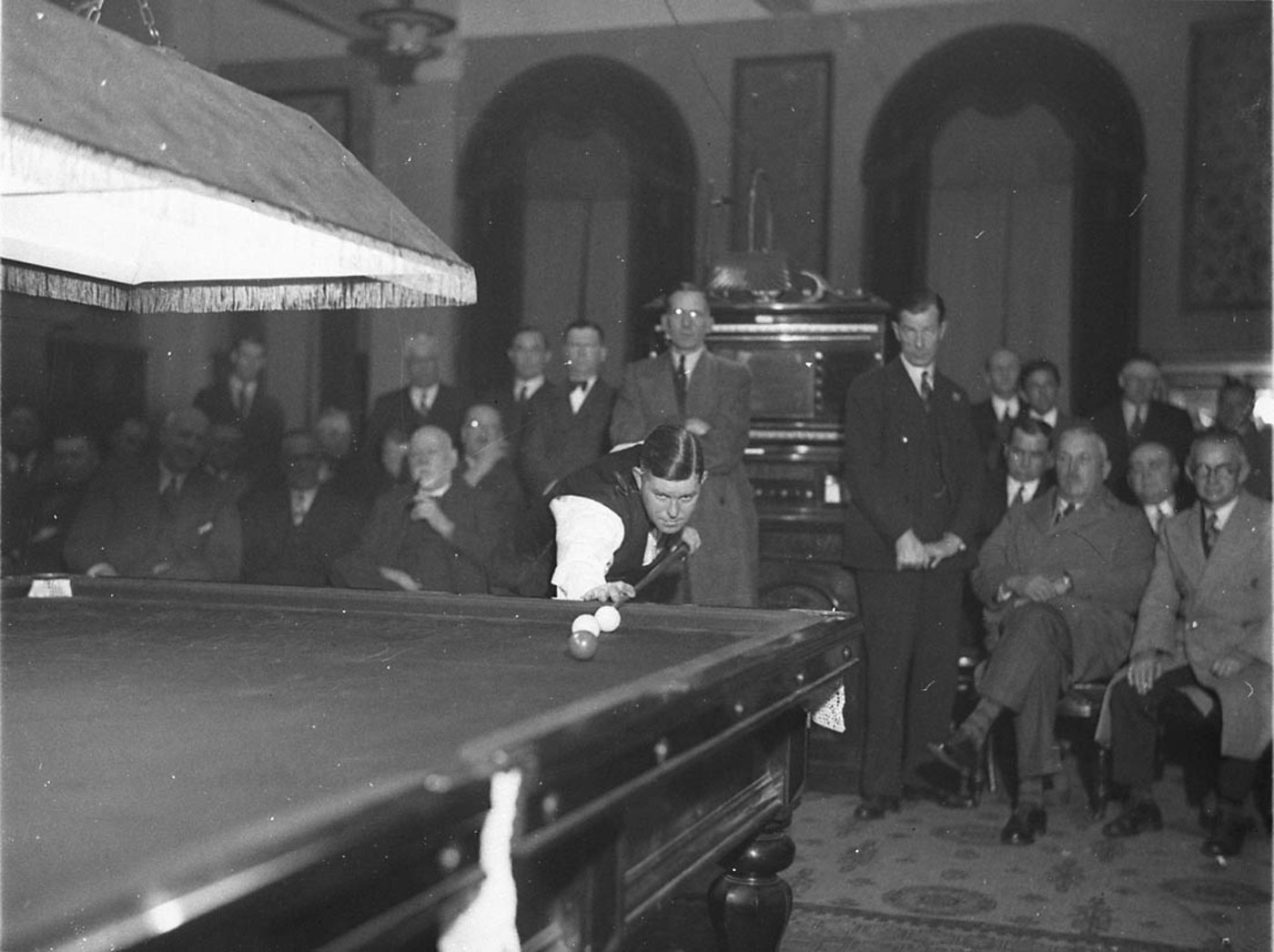
Walter Lindrum held the title from 1933 to 1951. In 2012, the billiards historian Clive Everton wrote that Lindrum was "a genius, who conquered his sport more thoroughly than any other player has conquered any other."

The Billiard Association was formed in early 1885 by a group of professional players and trade representatives, and produced a new set of rules in September 1885. The first two editions of the Association's championship were won by Roberts, against Cook and then against Joseph Bennett; the latter match was the last where the "championship table" that had been created by Roberts Sr. was used. After five unofficial events now recognised as editions of the Championship had taken place, The Association sanctioned two championships, one with a "spot-barred" format and the other "all-in". From 1889, the Association held only one championship, with rules largely similar to the "spot-barred" format. Another change was that while earlier championships were only open only to its members, the Association decided in 1888 that "the championship of Great Britain and Ireland shall be open to the world." In 1909, the Billiard Control Club was established as a rival to the Billiard Association and staged several editions of their own event. the rival organisations merged in 1919 as the Billiards Association and Control Council (BACC). After the 1933 tournament won by Australian Walter Lindrum, who insisted on defending the title in his home country, the title of the tournament was changed to the world championship and a separate event for UK players was initiated.

The 1934 edition was the first to be held outside the UK, and Lindrum won again, after which only two challenge matches took place over the next three decades. In 1950, Clark McConachy issued a challenge to Lindrum for the title, but Lindrum announced his retirement and returned the championship trophy to the BACC. The BACC decided that McConachy would play the winner of the UK Championship for the title, but when UK Champion Fred Davis declined to play because he felt the match was too early in the season, John Barrie was nominated in his place. McConachy defeated Barrie comfortably in 1951, and held the title unchallenged for the next 17 years. In 1968, Rex Williams decided to travel to Auckland to challenge McConachy, who was aged 73 by this time and whose play was affected by his Parkinson's disease. In what turned out to be a poor-quality match, Williams won the title.

== WPBSA title ==
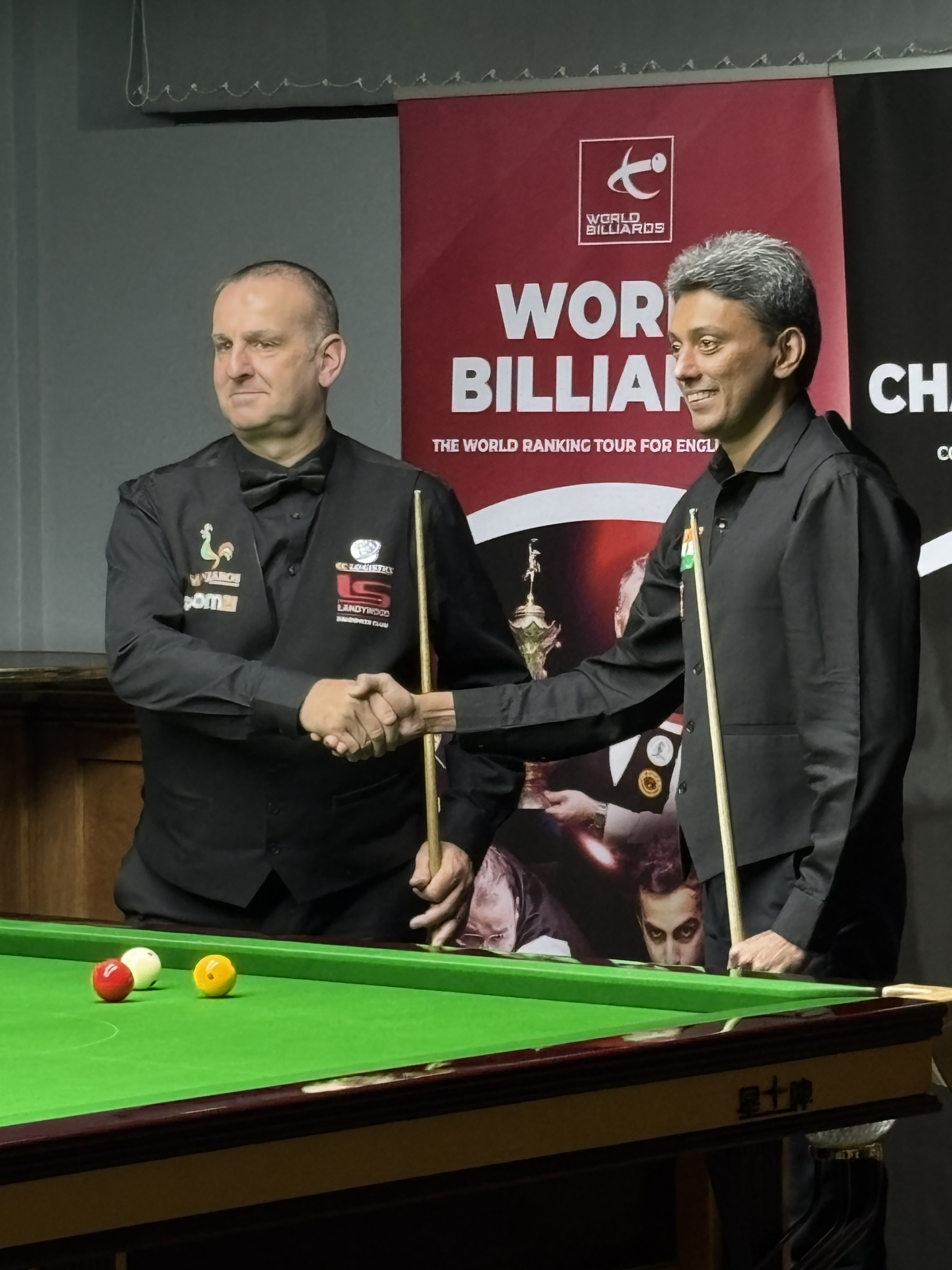
David Causier and Dhruv Sitwala at the 2025 final

Leslie Driffield, a member of the BA&CC governing body, was nominated by the Association as the challenger to Williams for the Championship. Williams declined to play Driffield within the five-month time limit set by the BA&CC, thus forfeiting the title in July 1970. In October 1970, the Professional Billiard Players Association (PBPA)—which had been re-established in 1968 by Williams and seven other players—disaffiliated from the BA&CC. The PBPA then changed its name to the World Professional Billiards and Snooker Association (WPBSA) in December 1970, and declared itself the governing body for the professional game, recognising Williams as champion. The BA&CC title was contested between Driffield and Jack Karnehm in June 1971; they were the only two professionals who continued to recognise the BA&CC as having authority over the game.

In the 1970s, there were further challenge matches for the title. Williams was dominant in this period. In 1980, Fred Davis won at the age of 67 to become World Champion. Since the 1980s, the world championship has sometimes been contested as a series of shorter games, for example in 150-up, the first player to win a designated number of games of first-to-150 is the victor.

From 1989 to 2011, Mike Russell was the dominant player, closely followed by Geet Sethi who won five titles. Some Australian players were successful in the 1980s, most notably Robby Foldvari (winner 1986, runner-up 1987) and Eddie Charlton (twice runner-up, 1984 and 1988).

In November 2011, WPBSA formed a subsidiary called World Billiards, which organised the 2012 championships as an amalgamation of the WPBSA and IBSF World Billiards Championship. There were separate events for timed and "short-up" (multiples of 150-up games). The same arrangements applied for the next two years, after which the IBSF withdrew and revived its own competition.

David Causier (with nine titles), Pankaj Advani, and Peter Gilchrist are other multiple title winners in the modern game.

== World Championships ==
The list of events now recognised as championship editions below is derived from A History of Billiards (2012) by Clive Everton, and the World Billiards website.

World Champions of English billiards
Edition	Date	Association	Format	Champion	Runner-up	Score	Venue	Ref.
1	1825	none	no contest (challenge)	Edwin Kentfield (ENG)	Declared himself champion when Jack Carr died before their match			
2	1849	none	no contest (challenge)	John Roberts Sr. (WAL)	Declared himself champion when Kentfield declined his challenge			
3	February 1870	none	Points (challenge)	William Cook (ENG)	John Roberts Sr. (WAL)	1,200–1,083	St James's Hall, London	
4	April 1870	none	Points (challenge)	John Roberts, Jr. (WAL)	William Cook (ENG)	1,000–552	St James's Hall, London	
5	May 1870	none	Points (challenge)	John Roberts, Jr. (WAL)	Alfred Bowles (ENG)	1,000–752	St James's Hall, London	
6	November 1870	none	Points (challenge)	Joseph Bennett (ENG)	John Roberts, Jr. (WAL)	1,000–905	St James's Hall, London	
7	January 1871	none	Points (challenge)	John Roberts, Jr. (WAL)	Joseph Bennett (ENG)	1,000–637	St James's Hall, London	
8	May 1871	none	Points (challenge)	William Cook (ENG)	John Roberts, Jr. (WAL)	1,000–985	St James's Hall, London	
9	November 1871	none	Points (challenge)	William Cook (ENG)	Joseph Bennett (ENG)	1,000–942	St James's Hall, London	
10	March 1872 (Note: Some sources say the match was in April)	none	Points (challenge)	William Cook (ENG)	John Roberts, Jr. (WAL)	1,000–799	St James's Hall, London	
11	February 1874	none	Points (challenge)	William Cook (ENG)	John Roberts, Jr. (WAL)	1,000–784	St James's Hall, London	
12	May 1875	none	Points (challenge)	John Roberts, Jr. (WAL)	William Cook (ENG)	1,000–837	The Criterion, London	
13	December 1875	none	Points (challenge)	John Roberts, Jr. (WAL)	William Cook (ENG)	1,000–865	St James's Hall, London	
14	April 1876	none	no contest	William Cook (ENG)	Declared champion when Roberts declined his challenge due to a clash with his planned tour of Australia			
15	May 1877	none	Points (challenge)	John Roberts, Jr. (WAL)	William Cook (ENG)	1,000–779	Gaiety Restaurant, Strand, London	
16	July 1878	none	no contest	William Cook (ENG)	Declared champion when Roberts failed to respond to his challenge			
17	November 1880	none	Points (challenge)	Joseph Bennett (ENG)	William Cook (ENG)	1,000–949	St James's Hall, London	
18	January 1881	none	Points (challenge)	Joseph Bennett (ENG)	Tom Taylor (ENG)	1,000–910	St James's Hall, London	
19	September 1881	none	no contest	William Cook (ENG)	Declared champion; Bennett had broken his arm, and resigned the title			
20	February 1885	none	no contest	John Roberts, Jr. (WAL)	Declared champion when Cook failed to respond to his challenge			
21	March–April 1885	Billiard Association	Points (challenge)	John Roberts, Jr. (WAL)	William Cook (ENG)	3,000–2,908	Billiard Hall, Argyll Street, London	
22	June 1885	Billiard Association	Points (challenge)	John Roberts, Jr. (WAL)	Joseph Bennett (ENG)	3,000–1,360	Royal Aquarium, London	
23	October 1887	none	Points (challenge)	Billy Mitchell (ENG)	William Peall (ENG)	15,000–13,733	Royal Aquarium, London	
24	March 1888	none	Points (challenge)	William Peall (ENG)	Billy Mitchell (ENG)	15,000–6,753	Royal Aquarium, London	
25	January 1889	George Wright and Co.	Points	Billy Mitchell (ENG)	William Peall (ENG)	Round-robin	Royal Aquarium, London	
26	February 1890	George Wright and Co.	Points	William Peall (ENG)	Billy Mitchell (ENG)	Round-robin	Royal Aquarium, London	
27	March 1891	George Wright and Co.	Points	William Peall (ENG)	Billy Mitchell (ENG)	2,500–776	Royal Aquarium, London	
28	April 1892	Billiard Association	Points (Note: "all-in")	William Peall (ENG)	Billy Mitchell (ENG)	5,000–1,755	Orme & Sons Showrooms, Soho Square	
29	April 1892	Billiard Association	Points (Note: "Spot-barred")	Billy Mitchell (ENG)	John North (ENG)	3,000–2,697	Thurston's Showrooms, Strand, London	
30	February 1893	Billiard Association	Points	Billy Mitchell (ENG)	John North (ENG)	9,000–6,525	Egyptian Hall, Piccadilly, London	
31	January 1894	Billiard Association	Points	Billy Mitchell (ENG)	Charles Dawson (ENG)	9,000–8,163	National Sporting Club, London	
32	January 1899	Billiard Association	Points	Charles Dawson (ENG)	John North (ENG)	9,000–4,715	Gaiety Restaurant, Strand, London	
33	April 1900	Billiard Association	Points	Charles Dawson (ENG)	Harry Stevenson (ENG)	9,000–6,775	Billiard Hall, Argyll Street, London	
34	January 1901	Billiard Association	Points	Harry Stevenson (ENG)	Charles Dawson (ENG)	9,000–6,406	Gaiety Restaurant, Strand, London	
35	April 1901	Billiard Association	Points	Charles Dawson (ENG)	Harry Stevenson (ENG)	9,000–5,796	Billiard Hall, Argyll Street, London	
36	November 1901	Billiard Association	no contest	Harry Stevenson (ENG)	Declared champion when Dawson refused to play for the title on a date set by the Billiard Association			
37	March 1903	Billiard Association	Points	Charles Dawson (ENG)	Harry Stevenson (ENG)	9,000–8,700	National Sporting Club, London	
38	September 1908	Billiard Association	no contest	Melbourne Inman (ENG)	Declared champion			
39	March 1909	Billiard Association	Points	Melbourne Inman (ENG)	Albert Williams (ENG)	9,000–7,662	National Sporting Club, London	
40	April 1909	Billiard Control Club	no contest	Harry Stevenson (ENG)	Declared champion as the only entrant for the championship			
41	April 1910	Billiard Control Club	Points	Harry Stevenson (ENG)	Melbourne Inman (ENG)	Match abandoned (Note: The match was first to 18,000 but was abandoned, due to the death of Stevenson's wife. Stevenson was leading 13,370–13,212.)	Baronial Hall, Holborn, London	
42	October 1910	Billiard Control Club	Points	Harry Stevenson (ENG)	Melbourne Inman (ENG)	18,000–16,907	Holborn Hall, London	
43	April 1911	Billiard Control Club	Points	Harry Stevenson (ENG)	Melbourne Inman (ENG)	18,000–16,914	Caxton Hall, London	
44	March 1912	Billiard Control Club	Points	Melbourne Inman (ENG)	Tom Reece (ENG)	18,000–9,875	Holborn Hall, London	
45	March 1913	Billiard Control Club	Points	Melbourne Inman (ENG)	Tom Reece (ENG)	18,000–16,627	Holborn Hall, London	
46	March 1914	Billiard Control Club	Points	Melbourne Inman (ENG)	Tom Reece (ENG)	18,000–12,826	Holborn Hall, London	
47	March 1919	Billiard Control Club	Points	Melbourne Inman (ENG)	Harry Stevenson (ENG)	18,000–9,468	Thurston's Hall, London	
48	May 1920	BACC	Points	Willie Smith (ENG)	Claude Falkiner (ENG)	16,000–14,500	Burroughes Hall, Piccadilly, London	
49	March 1921	BACC	Points	Tom Newman (ENG)	Tom Reece (ENG)	16,000–10,744	Thurston's Hall, London	
50	May 1922	BACC	Points	Tom Newman (ENG)	Claude Falkiner (ENG)	16,000–15,167	Thurston's Hall, London	
51	May 1923	BACC	Points	Willie Smith (ENG)	Tom Newman (ENG)	16,000–15,180	Holborn Hall, London	
52	May 1924	BACC	Points	Tom Newman (ENG)	Tom Reece (ENG)	16,000–14,845	Burroughes Hall, London	
53	April 1925	BACC	Points	Tom Newman (ENG)	Tom Reece (ENG)	16,000–10,092	Burroughes Hall, London	
54	April–May 1926	BACC	Points	Tom Newman (ENG)	Joe Davis (ENG)	16,000–9,505	Holborn Hall, London	
55	May 1927	BACC	Points	Tom Newman (ENG)	Joe Davis (ENG)	16,000–14,763	Orme Hall, Manchester	
56	May 1928	BACC	Points	Joe Davis (ENG)	Tom Newman (ENG)	16,000–14,874	Thurston's Hall, London	
57	April 1929	BACC	Points	Joe Davis (ENG)	Tom Newman (ENG)	18,000–17,219	Thurston's Hall, London	
58	May 1930	BACC	Timed	Joe Davis (ENG)	Tom Newman (ENG)	20,918–20,117	Thurston's Hall, London	
59	March 1932	BACC	Timed	Joe Davis (ENG)	Clark McConachy (NZL)	25,161–19,259	Thurston's Hall, London	
60	May 1933	BACC	Timed	Walter Lindrum (AUS)	Joe Davis (ENG)	21,815–21,121	Dorland Hall, London	
61	October 1934	BACC	Timed	Walter Lindrum (AUS)	Joe Davis (ENG)	23,553–22,678	Railway Institute, Melbourne	
62	September 1951	BACC	Timed (challenge)	Clark McConachy (NZL)	John Barrie (ENG)	9,274–6,691	Leicester Square Hall, London	
63	August 1968	BACC	Timed (challenge)	Rex Williams (ENG)	Clark McConachy (NZL)	5,499–5,234	YMCA Stadium, Auckland	
64	May 1971	WPBSA	Timed (challenge)	Rex Williams (ENG)	Bernard Bennett (ENG)	9,250–4,058	Castle Club, Southampton	
65	June 1971	BACC	Timed (challenge)	Leslie Driffield (ENG)	Jack Karnehm (ENG)	9,029–4,342	Middlesbrough Town Hall	
66	January 1973	B&SCC	Timed (challenge)	Leslie Driffield (ENG)	Albert Johnson (AUS)	9,204–4,696	Penrith Rugby League Club	
67	September 1973	WPBSA	Timed (challenge)	Rex Williams (ENG)	Jack Karnehm (ENG)	8,360–4,336	Marconi Athletic Club, Chelmsford	
68	September 1974	WPBSA	Timed (challenge)	Rex Williams (ENG)	Eddie Charlton (AUS)	7,017–4,916	Geraldton	
69	July 1976	WPBSA	Timed (challenge)	Rex Williams (ENG)	Eddie Charlton (AUS)	9,105–5,149	Aberdeen Chateau Geelong	
70	May 1980	WPBSA	Timed (challenge)	Fred Davis (ENG)	Rex Williams (ENG)	5,978–4,452	Northern Snooker Centre, Leeds	
71	November 1980	WPBSA	Timed	Fred Davis (ENG)	Mark Wildman (ENG)	3,037–2,064	Brownsover Hotel, Rugby	
72	1982	WPBSA	Points	Rex Williams (ENG)	Mark Wildman (ENG)	3,000–1,785	Astra La Reserve Club, Sutton Coldfield	
73	1983	WPBSA	Points	Rex Williams (ENG)	Fred Davis (ENG)	1,500–605	Court Snooker Club, Peterborough	
74	1984	WPBSA	Timed	Mark Wildman (ENG)	Eddie Charlton (AUS)	1,045–1,012	Majestic Snooker Club, Portsmouth	
75	1985	WPBSA	Short	Ray Edmonds (ENG)	Norman Dagley (ENG)	3–1	Hatton Garden Snooker Centre, London	
76	1986	WPBSA	Short	Robby Foldvari (AUS)	Norman Dagley (ENG)	3–1	Romiley Forum Stockport	
77	1987	WPBSA	Short	Norman Dagley (ENG)	Robby Foldvari (AUS)	3–1	Albert Hall, Bolton	
78	1988	WPBSA	Short	Norman Dagley (ENG)	Eddie Charlton (AUS)	7–4	Albert Hall, Bolton	
79	1989	WPBSA	Timed	Mike Russell (ENG)	Peter Gilchrist (ENG)	2,242–1,347	Fairmont Resort, Leura	
–	1990	No tournament held						
80	1991	WPBSA	Timed	Mike Russell (ENG)	Robby Foldvari (AUS)	1,352–957	Hyatt Regency Hotel, New Delhi	
81	1992	WPBSA	Timed	Geet Sethi (IND)	Mike Russell (ENG)	2,529–718	Holiday Inn, Bombay	
82	1993	WPBSA	Timed	Geet Sethi (IND)	Mike Russell (ENG)	2,139–1,140	President Hotel, Bombay	
83	1994	WPBSA	Timed	Peter Gilchrist (ENG)	Mike Russell (ENG)	1,539–645	Leela Kempinski Hotel, Bombay	
84	1995	WPBSA	Timed	Geet Sethi (IND)	Devendra Joshi (IND)	1,661–931	President Hotel, Bombay	
85	1996	WPBSA	Timed	Mike Russell (ENG)	Geet Sethi (IND)	2,534–1,848	Bombay Gymkhana, South Mumbai	
–	1997	No tournament held						
86	1998	WPBSA	Timed	Geet Sethi (IND)	Mike Russell (ENG)	1,400–1,015	Fortune Landmark Hotel, Ahmedabad	
87	1999	WPBSA	Points	Mike Russell (ENG)	Peter Gilchrist (ENG)	2,000–832	Taj Connemara Hotel, Chennai	
–	2000	No tournament held						
88	2001	WPBSA	Timed	Peter Gilchrist (ENG)	Mike Russell (ENG)	1,287–863	Cricket Club of India, Mumbai	
89	2002	WPBSA	Timed	Mike Russell (ENG)	Peter Gilchrist (ENG)	2,251–1,273	Centurion Hotel, Midsomer Norton	
90	2003	WPBSA	Short	Mike Russell (ENG)	Peter Gilchrist (ENG)	6–4	Jerma Palace Hotel, Marsaskala	
91	2004	WPBSA	Timed	Mike Russell (ENG)	David Causier (ENG)	2,402–1,349	Pontins, Prestatyn	
92	2005	WPBSA	Timed	Chris Shutt (ENG)	Mike Russell (ENG)	1,620–1,365	Pontins, Prestatyn	
93	2006	WPBSA	Timed	Geet Sethi (IND)	Lee Lagan (ENG)	2,073–1,057	Pontins, Prestatyn	
94	2007	WPBSA	Timed	Mike Russell (ENG)	Chris Shutt (ENG)	2,166–1,710	Northern Snooker Centre, Leeds	
95	2008	WPBSA	Timed	Mike Russell (ENG)	Geet Sethi (IND)	1,823–1,342	Northern Snooker Centre, Leeds	
96	2009	WPBSA	Timed	Pankaj Advani (IND)	Mike Russell (ENG)	2,030–1,253	Northern Snooker Centre, Leeds	
97	2010	WPBSA	Timed	Mike Russell (ENG)	Dhruv Sitwala (IND)	1,738–1,204	Northern Snooker Centre, Leeds	
98	2011	WPBSA	Points	Mike Russell (ENG)	David Causier (ENG)	1,500–558	Northern Snooker Centre, Leeds	
99	2012	WBL/IBSF	Short	Rupesh Shah (IND)	Matthew Bolton (AUS)	6–2	Northern Snooker Centre, Leeds	
99	2012	WBL/IBSF	Timed	Pankaj Advani (IND)	Mike Russell (ENG)	1,895–1,216	Northern Snooker Centre, Leeds	
100	2013	WBL/IBSF	Short	David Causier (ENG)	Alok Kumar (IND)	6–1	Northern Snooker Centre, Leeds	
100	2013	WBL/IBSF	Points	Peter Gilchrist (SIN)	David Causier (ENG)	1,500–1,085	Northern Snooker Centre, Leeds	
101	2014	WBL/IBSF	Short	Pankaj Advani (IND)	Peter Gilchrist (SIN)	6–2	Northern Snooker Centre, Leeds	
101	2014	WBL/IBSF	Timed	Pankaj Advani (IND)	Robert Hall (ENG)	1,928–893	Northern Snooker Centre, Leeds	
102	2015	WBL	Short	David Causier (ENG)	Robert Hall (ENG)	6–1	Northern Snooker Centre, Leeds	
102	2015	WBL	Points	David Causier (ENG)	Peter Gilchrist (SIN)	1,500–1,277	Northern Snooker Centre, Leeds	
103	2016	WBL	Short	David Causier (ENG)	Dhruv Sitwala (IND)	8–6	Northern Snooker Centre, Leeds	
103	2016	WBL	Timed	Mike Russell (ENG)	David Causier (ENG)	2,224–1,115	Northern Snooker Centre, Leeds	
104	2017	WBL	Short	David Causier (ENG)	Sourav Kothari (IND)	8–4	Northern Snooker Centre, Leeds	
104	2017	WBL	Points	David Causier (ENG)	Peter Gilchrist (SIN)	1,500–779	Northern Snooker Centre, Leeds	
105	2018	WBL	Timed	Sourav Kothari (IND)	Peter Gilchrist (SIN)	1,134–944	Northern Snooker Centre, Leeds	
106	2019	WBL	Timed	Peter Gilchrist (SIN)	Sourav Kothari (IND)	1,307–967	RACV Club, Melbourne	
–	2020	No tournament held						
–	2021	No tournament held						
107	2022	WBL	Timed	David Causier (ENG)	Peter Gilchrist (SIN)	1,776–1,092	Ronnie O'Sullivan Snooker Academy, Singapore	
108	2023	WBL	Timed	Peter Gilchrist (SIN)	David Causier (ENG)	1,824–783	Landywood Snooker Club, Great Wyrley	
109	2024	WBL	Timed	David Causier (ENG)	Robert Hall (ENG)	2,088–1,109	Landywood Snooker Club, Great Wyrley	
110	2025	WBL	Timed	David Causier (ENG)	Dhruv Sitwala (IND)	2,948–677	Landywood Snooker Club, Great Wyrley	
111	2026	WBL	Timed	Pankaj Advani (IND)	Robert Hall (ENG)	1906–1206	Landywood Snooker Club, Great Wyrley	

== See also ==
- IBSF World Billiards Championship
- World Women's Billiards Championship
- Women's Professional Billiards Championship
