= William Peall =

English billiards champion (1854–1952)

William J. Peall
- W. J. Peall
- Born: 30 December 1854; St Pancras, London
- Died: 6 June 1952 (aged 97); Hove
- Sport country: England
- Highest break: 3,304
- World Billiards Champion: 1888, 1890, 1891, 1892

William Peall (often known as W. J. Peall) was an English player of English billiards. He won the 1892 Billiard Association Billiard Championship, which can be regarded as the equivalent of the world billiards championship.

== Biography ==
Peall was born on 31 December 1854, at St. Pancras, London. He learnt to play billiards at the age of 13 and received some playing lessons from John Roberts Sr.

Following success as an amateur player, he became a professional in 1881. He was known as the leading exponent of repeated potting of the red ball. In 1884, he completed 548 consecutive pots of the red in a match against Billy Mitchell, and in 1895, again against Mitchell, achieved 643 consecutive pots of the red.

In October 1887, Peall and Mitchell played each other at the Royal Aquarium in a 15,000-up match advertised as the "All-in Championship." Despite this billing, it was not actually recognised by the recently formed Billiard Association as a championship match. On the last day, Mitchell was almost 2,000 points behind Peall, but with a series of breaks including 801 and 912, recovered to win the match 15,000–13,733. The second of these unofficial matches was staged in March 1888 at the same venue, and this time Peall won by a large margin, 15,00–6,753, including a record break of 2,031.

Peall was the runner-up to Mitchell in the first of three "Championship of the World" tournaments promoted from 1889 to 1891 by billiard table manufacturers George Wright and Company, and won the other two.

In 1891, the Billiard Association decided to run separate championship tournaments for both "spot-barred" matches, where there were restrictions on the number of consecutive pots of the red ball allowed, and for "all-in" matches, where there were no restrictions on consecutive pots. There were eight entrants for the "all-in" championship. Peall beat both Charles Dawson and Mitchell easily on his way to winning the title. He concluded the final against Mitchell with an unfinished break of 2,099, winning 5,000–1,755. Mitchell won the "spot-barred" title held soon afterwards.

He was still making practice breaks of over 200 in his eighties. His highest break was 3,304, against Dawson in 1890, and it was reported that in his prime he could score 1,000 points in under an hour from the spot stroke.

Peall died on 6 June 1952, in Hove.
