= Tom Reese =

Tom Reese may refer to:

- Tom Reese (cricket historian), New Zealand cricketer and cricket historian
- Tom Reese (actor), American actor

== See also ==
- Thomas Reese (disambiguation)
- Tom Rees (disambiguation)
- Tom Reece, English billiards player
