= Walter Lindrum =

Australian billiards player (1898–1960)

Walter Lindrum OBE
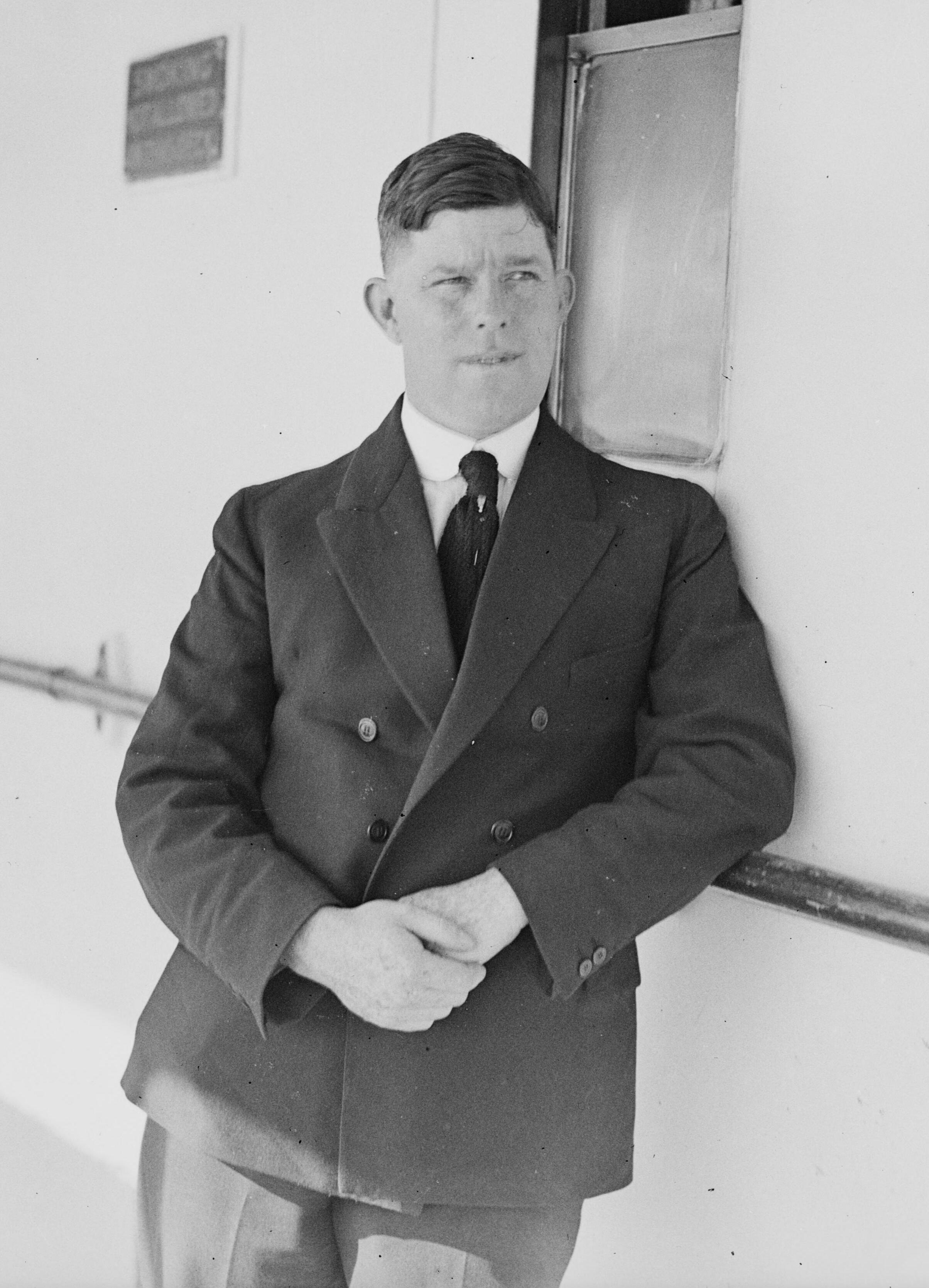
- Lindrum, c. 1930
- Born: 29 August 1898; Kalgoorlie, Western Australia
- Died: 30 July 1960 (aged 61); Surfers Paradise, Queensland, Australia
- Sport country: Australia
- Professional: 1911–1950
- World Billiards Champion: 1933, 1934; retired uncontested in 1950

Walter Albert Lindrum (29 August 1898 – 30 July 1960), often known as Wally Lindrum, was an Australian professional player of English billiards who held the World Professional Billiards Championship from 1933 until his retirement in 1950. Being the first Lindrum born in Western Australia, he was named Walter Albert to have the initials of the state where he was born. He was one of the most successful players ever seen in billiards, with 57 world records to his credit, some of which still stand.

== Early life ==
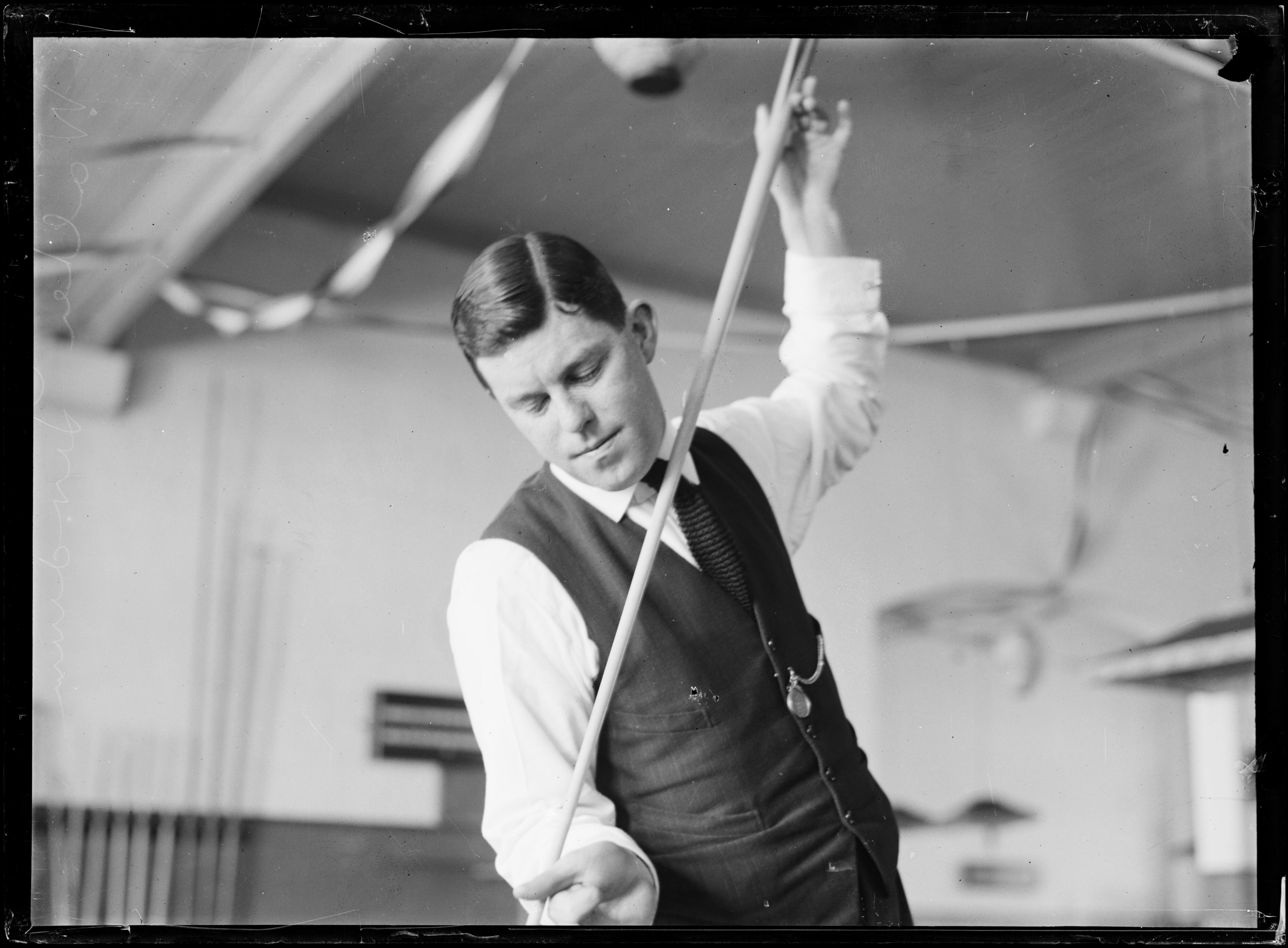
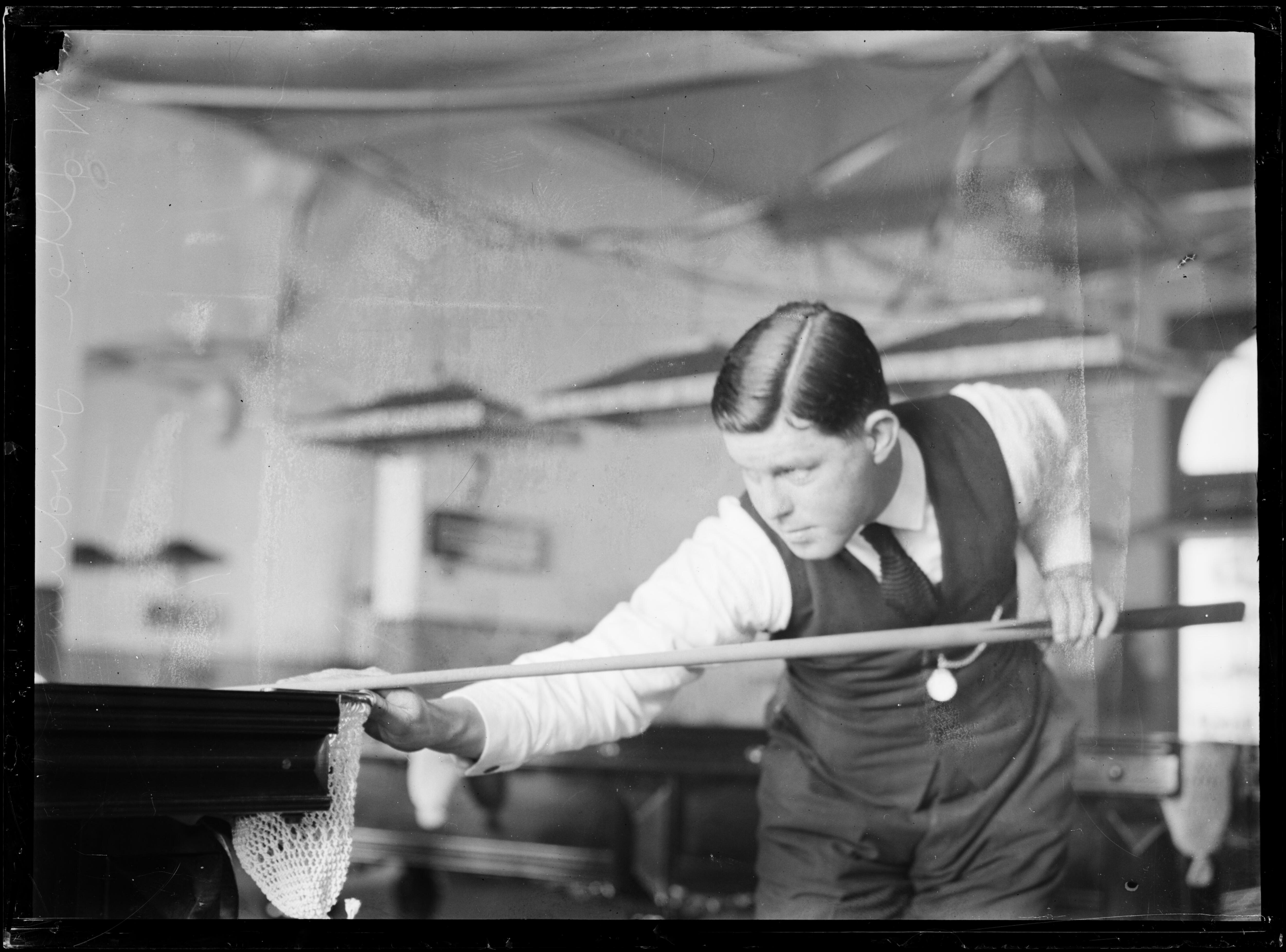

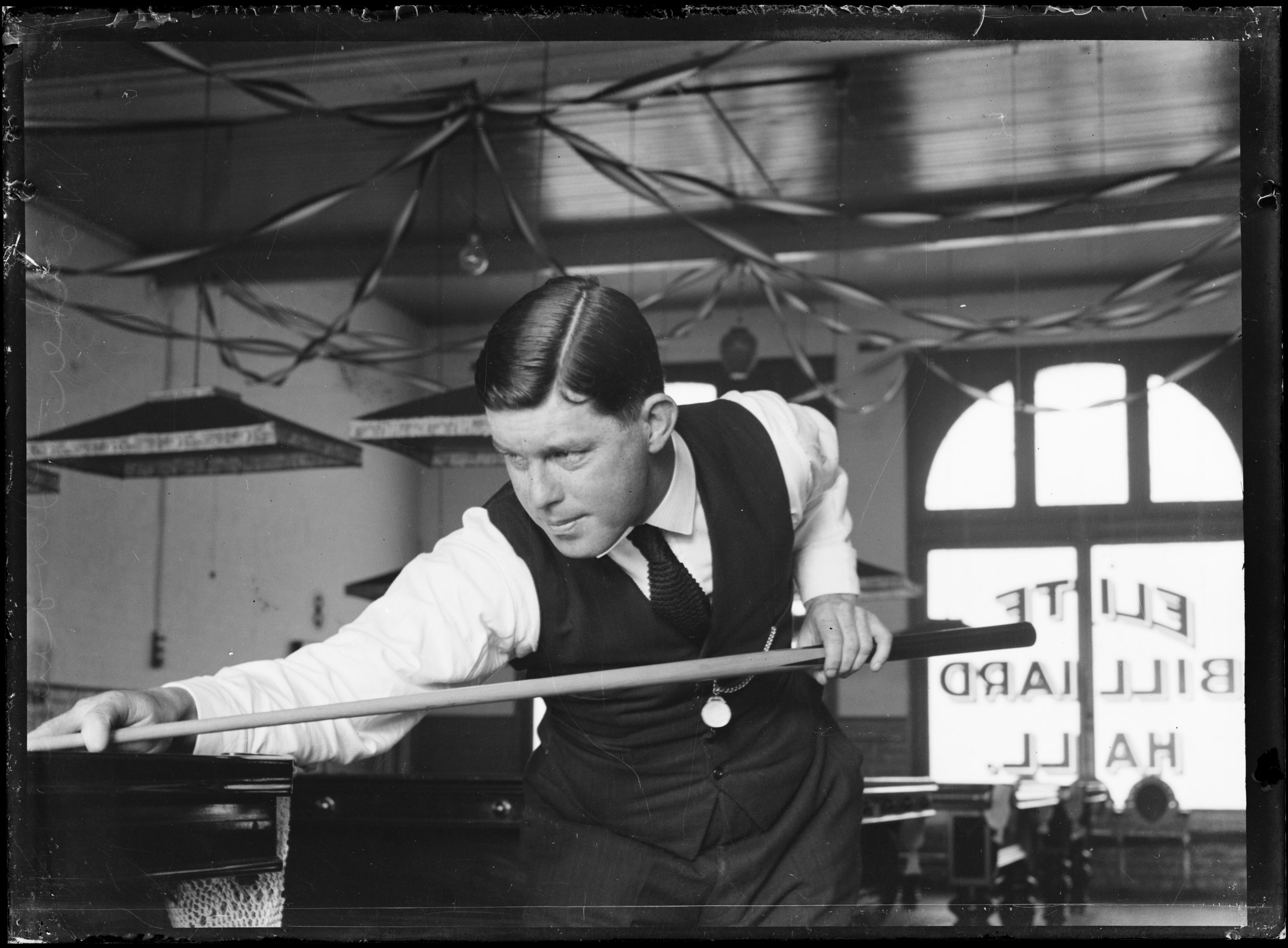
Lindrum demonstrating his technique

Lindrum's grandfather, Frederick William Lindrum I, was Australia's first World Professional Billiards Champion having defeated Britain's John Roberts Sr in 1869. Walter's father, Frederick William Lindrum II, was an Australian Billiards Champion at the age of 20. Walter's older brother, Frederick William Lindrum III, became professional Australian Billiards Champion in 1909. Frederick II closely tutored his sons. The family can be considered the greatest billiard playing family the world has ever known. His mother Laura (née Williams) was locally renowned at both sewing and baking, winning numerous Kalgoorlie baking competitions.

Walter himself was born on 29 August 1898 in the Western Australian mining town of Kalgoorlie. He lost the tip of his index finger on his right hand in an accident in 1901, and his father taught him to play billiards left-handed. Much of his childhood was spent practising billiards for up to twelve hours per day, under his father's tutelage on his two billiard tables in the Palace Hotel, Kalgoorlie, and also guided by William (Billy) Weston, a former New Zealand Billiard Champion, who owned a billiard saloon at the corner of Brookman and Wilson Streets in Kalgoorlie. Standing on a crate to reach the table, Lindrum was "polished" by Weston, who taught him the technique of playing top of the table, a method to increase breaks. The family were itinerant, and often moved from town to town. Lindrum's first professional game was played at the age of only 13 years.

By the age of 16, Walter was regularly making breaks of over 1,000 points during practice at the London Tavern, Elizabeth Street, Melbourne, where Fred Lindrum II was running a three-table billiard parlour. By 1921 Walter Lindrum was defeating his older brother, Frederick III, then the Australian Billiards Champion. Walter refused to play his brother for the title.

== Family ==
Walter married Rose Coates in 1929 in Sydney. She was dying at this time and died soon after. His second marriage was to Alicia Hoskin (known as Sue) on 9 April 1933 in London. Walter and his wife toured the world for many years. Alicia and Walter were divorced in 1955. Walter married a third time in July 1956, to Beryl Elaine, née Carr, who survived him.

== Billiards champion ==
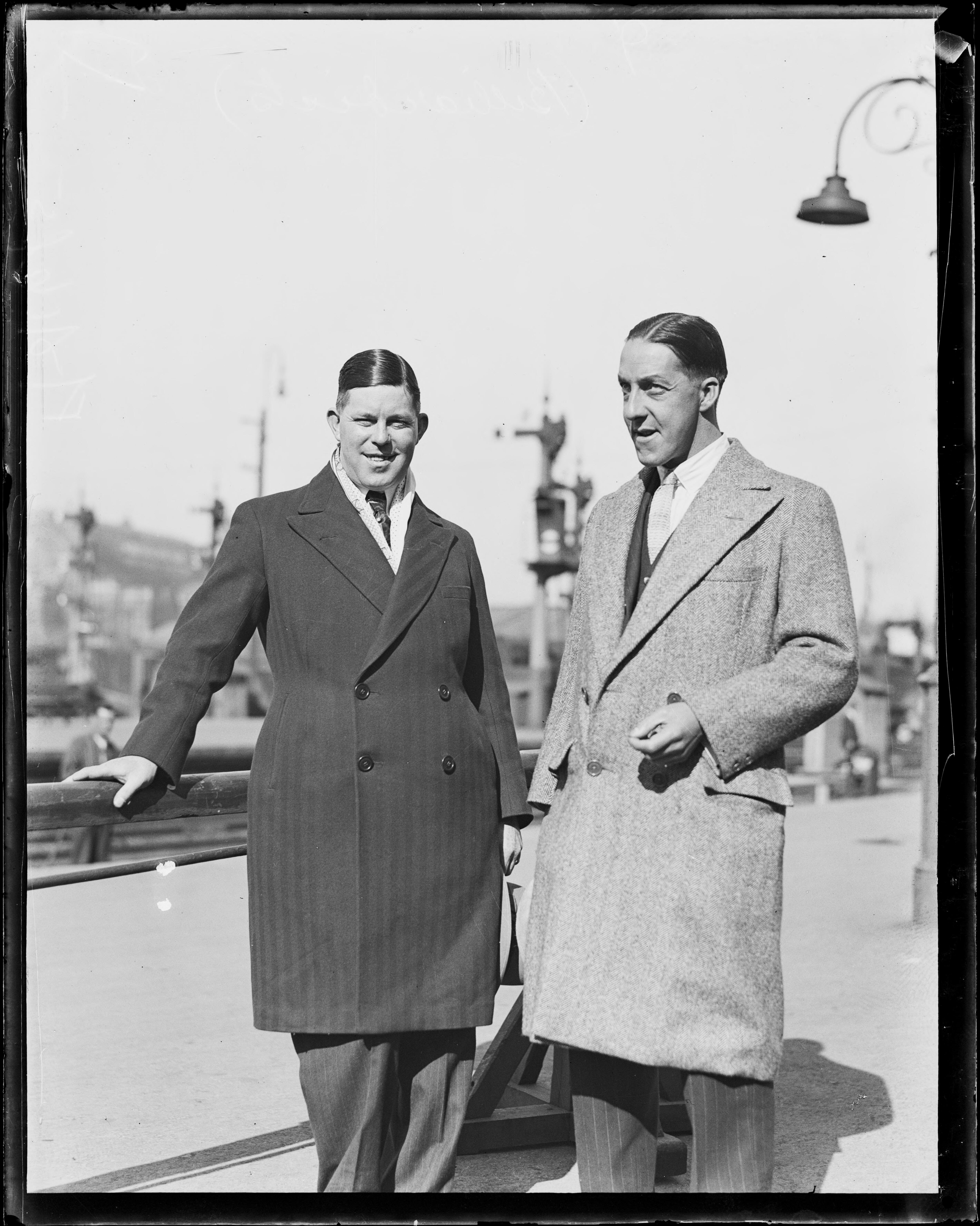
Lindrum (left) and British opponent Tom Newman in 1930

During the mid-1920s Walter Lindrum's standard of play was without effective competition in Australia, with many players refusing to play against him. As a result, exhibition matches were often organised, especially with New Zealand Billiard Champion Clark McConachy. Lindrum published his instructional book, Billiards, in 1930 [first printed date in book]. It was revised and reprinted in 1940 as Billiards and Snooker, "proceeds from the sale going to the Lindrum War Drive", his World War II fundraising effort, in later printings.

It was not until 1929 that Willie Smith, World Champion in 1920 and 1923, and one of the best English billiards players of the time, visited Australia and played three fairly even matches against Lindrum. With both players being one match up, Lindrum was forced to abandon the third game midway through, upon the death of his wife due to heart failure. While technically the match was a forfeit, Smith refused to accept the trophy and insisted it be awarded to Lindrum.

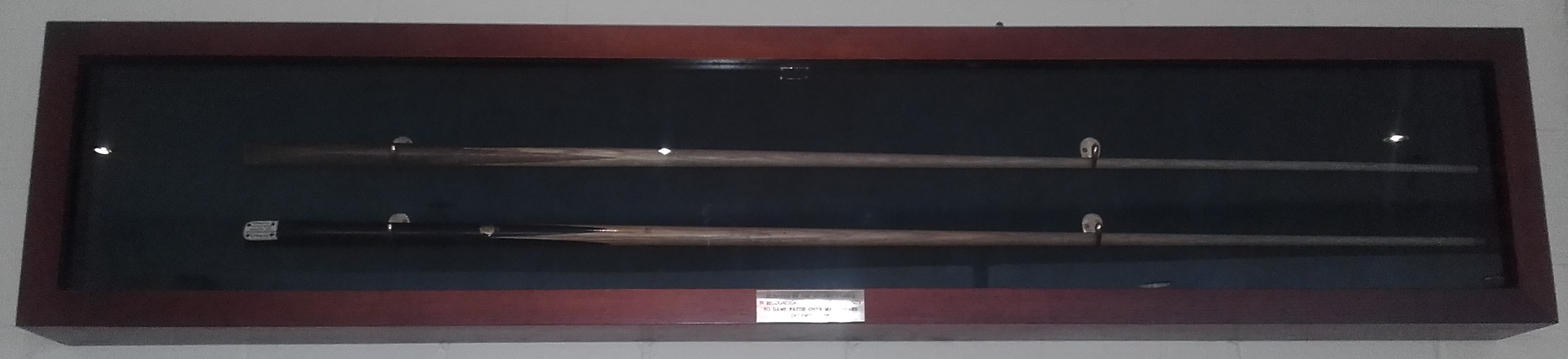
1929 World Record Cue, Commonwealth Club, Canberra

On 7 December 1929, Lindrum made a world record break of 3,262. The cue was endorsed with an engraved ivory plate 'The World's Record Break Cue. 3262 Dec.7th 1929. Walter Lindrum, Australia'. It came into the collection of Robert Menzies, Prime Minister of Australia, and after Menzies' death was presented to the Commonwealth Club in Canberra in 1965.

Smith, McConachy and Lindrum departed Australia in September 1929 for a tour of England. Between 1929 and 1933 Lindrum dominated the English billiards scene. With games usually being played to 24,000 points, he would often start conceding as many as 7000 points to his opponents. Lindrum and his main rivals, McConachy, Smith, Joe Davis (World Champion 1928–1932) and Tom Newman (World Champion 1921–1922, 1924–1927), were called in the press "the big five".

On Lindrum's second tour of England, in late 1930, Donald Bradman and other members of the touring Australian cricket team, would sometimes attend Lindrum's matches at Thurston's Hall, London. As an indication of the esteem in which Lindrum was held, the critic Neville Cardus referred to Bradman as "the Lindrum of cricket".

On 19 February 1931, Lindrum gave a billiards exhibition for the King and other members of the Royal Family at Buckingham Palace. King George V presented Lindrum with a pair of gold and enamel cuff links bearing the royal monogram. These formed part of Lindrum's essential attire for the remainder of his playing career, and he wore them daily for the rest of his life.

His record break of 4,137 was made in a match he lost against Joe Davis at Thurston's Hall on 19 January 1932. However, this precipitated a change in the rules of the game. As this break mostly consisted of long runs of close cannons (a total of 902 cannons were scored), the Billiards Control Council established the first version of the baulk-line-rule, in which the cue ball had to cross the baulk line every 200 points during a break. A 1932 tour of the United States and Canada by several players, including Lindrum, proved a disaster, with disappointing attendances and financial losses by the players.

Lindrum won the World Professional Billiards Championship in 1933 and 1934, and held it until his retirement in 1950.

After the debacle of the 1932 North American tour and his winning of the 1933 World Championship, Lindrum argued that he should be allowed to defend his title in Australia. The 1934 match was organised to coincide with the Melbourne centenary celebrations in September 1934. His challengers were the New Zealand Champion, Clark McConachy, and United Kingdom Champion, Joe Davis, with Davis finishing runner-up. Lindrum won this title, but in subsequent years the title became dormant for lack of challengers, until Lindrum relinquished it upon retirement. The title of World Professional Billiards Champion next passed to McConachy in 1951 who held it until 1968, when he was defeated by Rex Williams.

While some made the criticism that Lindrum's play was somewhat mechanical and lacked style, rival and six-time World Champion Tom Newman wrote: "It is the greatest injustice you can do to Walter to call him a scoring machine. Nothing could be more unlike him. He is showing you everything the beautiful game can show."

During the Second World War, Lindrum performed about 4,000 exhibition games, raising over £500,000 for the war effort (including revenues from sales of his book). Over his lifetime, he raised more than £2 million for charity. He was made a Member of the Order of the British Empire (MBE) in 1951, and an Officer of the order (OBE) in the 1958 New Year Honours list.

== Records ==
In June 1927 in Melbourne, he claimed a world speed record when he scored 816 points in 23 minutes in an unfinished break.

During 1930 in Manchester, Lindrum set a record aggregate of 30,817 during the fortnight match against Willie Smith. In this match he made 10 breaks over 1,000 with a highest of 2,419. In his final match of the tour against Smith in London, Lindrum's performance set numerous records: the highest individual aggregate (36,256), the largest winning margin (21,285), a record match average (262), and a record number of four-figure breaks (11). Smith, although beaten, had played excellently with an average of 109 per innings for the match.

His world record break of 4,137 was made in a match against Joe Davis at Thurston's Hall, London on 19 January 1932. Lindrum occupied the table for 2 hours 55 minutes, for about 1,900 consecutive scoring shots. He also holds the record break for each country that he played in, the fastest century break (46 seconds) and 1011 points in 30 minutes.

In 1933 on a tour to South Africa, Lindrum claimed a new world record for fast scoring when he completed 1,000 points in 28 minutes in Johannesburg.

== Death ==
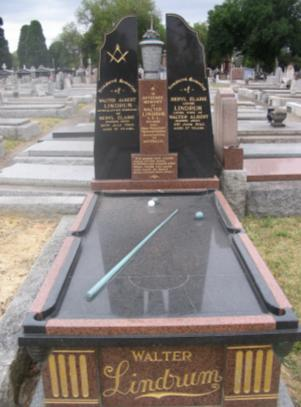
Walter Lindrum's distinctive grave in Melbourne General Cemetery

On 30 July 1960, at the age of 61, Walter Lindrum suddenly became ill and died while on holiday in Surfers Paradise, Queensland. The cause of death was officially listed as heart failure, but it has alternatively been suggested that he died as a result of food poisoning from a steak and kidney pie.

Following his death, cricketing legend Sir Donald Bradman wrote to Lindrum's niece, Dolly Lindrum: "In my opinion he was not only the greatest billiards player who ever lived, but he was also the most modest of great champions."

His body was returned to Melbourne, and he was given a state funeral attended by 1,500 people. He was buried at Melbourne General Cemetery, with champion cyclist Sir Hubert Opperman raising the funds for a distinctive monument consisting of a billiards table, complete with balls and cue; more than fifty years after his death the site reportedly remains the most visited grave in this substantial cemetery.

Lindrum died intestate. In 2023, it was reported by the Australian Financial Review that Lindrum's family "continues to squabble about who owns real estate and valuable memorabilia for three generations after his death". Further legal action was initiated following the death of Lindrum's niece Irene May, who had died in 2019 with an estate valued at $13 million including three properties previously owned by Lindrum in Albert Park, Victoria. A case heard in the County Court of Victoria in September 2023 concerned the ownership of Lindrum's memorabilia in the context of an alleged trust agreement established in 1966.

== Recognition ==
In 1981, Lindrum was honoured on a postage stamp issued by Australia Post, which featured a caricature of him by famed artist Tony Rafty. Lindrum was inducted into the Sport Australia Hall of Fame and the Western Australia Sporting Hall of Champions in 1985. His house in Melbourne at 158 Kerferd Road, Albert Park, is noted for its historical association with him by the Port Phillip Council. Lindrum is generally regarded as one of the all-time great Australian sporting heroes, along with the likes of Donald Bradman, Heather McKay, Margaret Court, Haydn Bunton, Sr. and Hubert Opperman.

In Melbourne, the Hotel Lindrum on Flinders Street has incorporated much memorabilia associated with Walter Lindrum. The building formerly housed the Lindrum's Billiard Centre run by Walter's niece, Dolly. One of the original tables from the Billiard Centre has been fully restored there by the original manufacturing company. In April 2009, the Hotel Lindrum hosted the Capital Cup, a billiards tournament that, on its 10th anniversary, honoured the life and history of Walter Lindrum.

The mathematician John Littlewood nominated a shot of Lindrum's as "the best stroke ever made in a game of billiards". As Littlewood reported it, Lindrum "deliberately played to make a cannon in which the white balls were left touching, and succeeded. (The balls were spotted in accordance with the laws, and the break could continue.)"

In 2010, the Victorian Billiards and Snooker Council and Lindrum's niece Dolly Lindrum were seeking funding to have a large collection of Lindrum memorabilia including personal and professional effects, newspaper clippings, diagrams of his shots, letters, and photographs to be transferred from her house and displayed in Australia's National Sports Museum.

Tammy Lindrum, great-niece and God-daughter of Walter Lindrum, plays an on-going role in keeping Walter Lindrum's legacy alive. https://www.walterlindrum.org/tammy-lindrum/
