= H. W. Stevenson =

English billiards player (1874–1944)

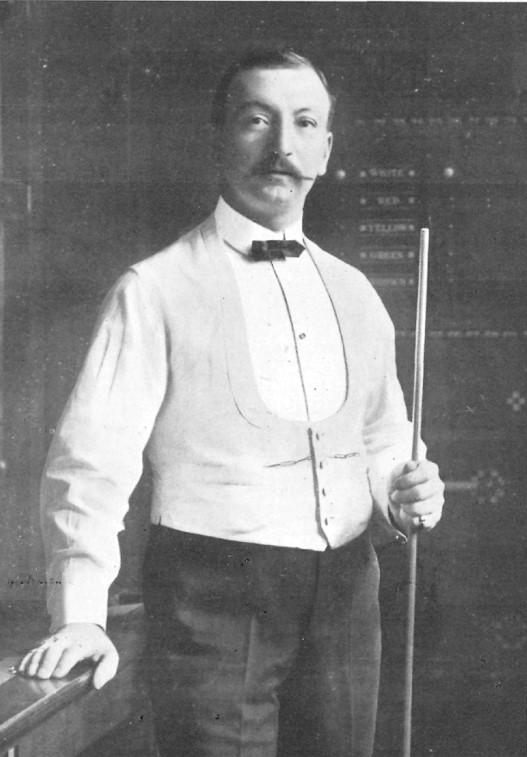
- Stevenson
- Born: 14 June 1874; Hull
- Died: 11 June 1944 (aged 69)
- Sport country: England
- World Billiards Champion: 1901 (twice), 1909, 1910 (twice), 1911

Harry W. Stevenson (14 June 1874 – 11 June 1944) was an English billiards player. He held the world professional title in billiards five times, including two times that he was declared champion without playing.

== Biography ==
Stevenson was born on 14 June 1874, Kingston upon Hull, and became a billiards marker, a role that involved keeping the score of billiards matches. He moved to South Africa, but returned to England by 1893.

In 1900, Stevenson and Edward Diggle challenged Charles Dawson for the Billiards Association title. Stevenson beat Diggle in the preliminary round, compiling a break of 648 in the match, but lost 6,775–9,000 to Dawson.

In January 1901, Stevenson beat Dawson to win the title, but Dawson then won it back in April. Following the April match, Stevenson challenged Dawson again. The match was due to be played within three months of the challenge being made, but both players agreed to a postponement until November. Although Dawson was aware that the match was due to be played in November, he organised an exhibition match with Diggle in Glasgow for that month and was unavailable for the championship match. Stevenson refused a further extension, and was awarded the title.

Dawson and Stevenson contested for the title again in 1903, with Dawson winning a close match 9,000–8,700. Following this, the championship was not contested for several years. In 1908, the Billiards Association declared Melbourne Inman the champion. The Billiards Control Club (BCC), formed in 1908, promoted a championship for which Stevenson was the only entry, and he was therefore declared the BCC champion. Inman challenged Stevenson for the BCC title, and they played in 1910, but the match was abandoned following the death of Stevenson's wife on 4 May 1910, with Stevenson leading at that point by just 158. Stevenson subsequently beat Inman for the title twice, in October 1910 and April 1911. Stevenson declined to defend the title in 1912, opting instead to undertake an exhibition tour. Stevenson played Inman again 1919, but was soundly beaten, 9,468–16,000.

His highest break at billiards was 1,016, made in 1912. Sidney Felsted wrote in The Badminton Magazine of Sports and Pastimes in 1913 that "Stevenson possibly represents the prettiest and most stylish player the world has ever seen".

== World Professional Billiards Titles ==
Billiards Association

- January 1901, beat Charles Dawson 9,000-6,406
- November 1901 (declared champion)

Billiards Control Club

- April 1909 (declared champion)
- October 1910, beat Melbourne Inman 18,000–16,907
- 1911, beat Melbourne Inman 18,000–16,914

=== Snooker Titles (1) ===
- 1909 American Tournament
