= John Roberts Jr (billiards player) =

English player of English billiards

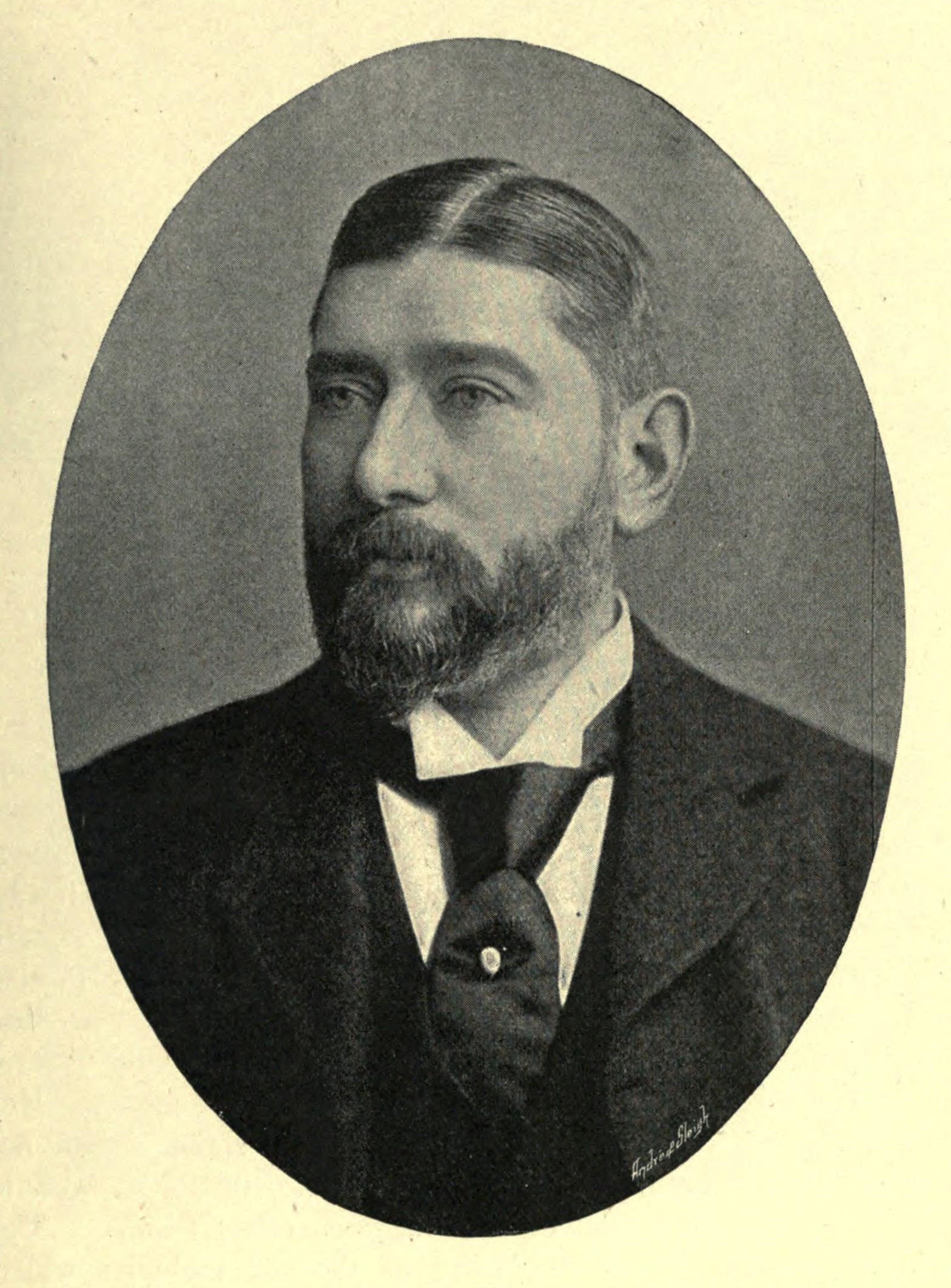
- John Roberts Jr, by R. E. Ruddock
- Sport country: England
- World Billiards Champion: April 1870, May 1870, January 1871, May 1875, December 1875, May 1877, February 1885, April 1885, June 1885

John Roberts Jr (15 August 1847 – 23 December 1919) was a dominant English professional player of English billiards. He won the world professional title eight times in matches between 1870 - 1885 when it was held on a challenge basis. His highest break came in 1894. Roberts was also a notable manufacturer of billiards cues and tables, and promoter of the sport.

== Early years ==
John Roberts was born at Ardwick, near Chorlton-on-Medlock in Manchester. He was baptised on 30 September 1847 at All Saints Church, Chorlton-on-Medlock.

He began playing billiards at about the age of ten, when his father took charge of the Billiard Room at the George Hotel in Liverpool. He played against his father, and sometimes against John Herst who also became a famous professional player.

Roberts won his first handicap in 1866, beating H. Evans in the final. This was held at St James's Hall, and promoted by the billiard player William Dufton. Sixteen of the best players in England took part. He also won the next handicap held at the same place, and was gifted a gold watch and chain as first prize.

In his 1869 book Roberts On Billiards, his father believed his eldest son John at that time to have been the best of the second rank players alongside William Cook.

== Championship matches ==
His first championship was achieved by beating William Cook 1,000–522 on 14 April 1870 at St James's Hall.

On 30 May 1870, in the minor hall, St James's Hall, he beat Alfred Bowles of Brighton 1,000–752.

On 28 November 1870 Roberts lost the championship by 95 points, losing to Joseph Bennett. He regained the championship on 30 January 1871, beating the same player 1,000–637.

Willam Cook defeated Roberts by just 15 points, in a match on 25 May 1871 to take the championship.

Roberts lost to Cook by a margin of 201 points on 4 March 1872. And lost again to the same player by 216 points on 24 February 1874.

He won the championship for a fourth time on 24 May 1875, in a 1,000–837 victory over Cook at The Criterion.

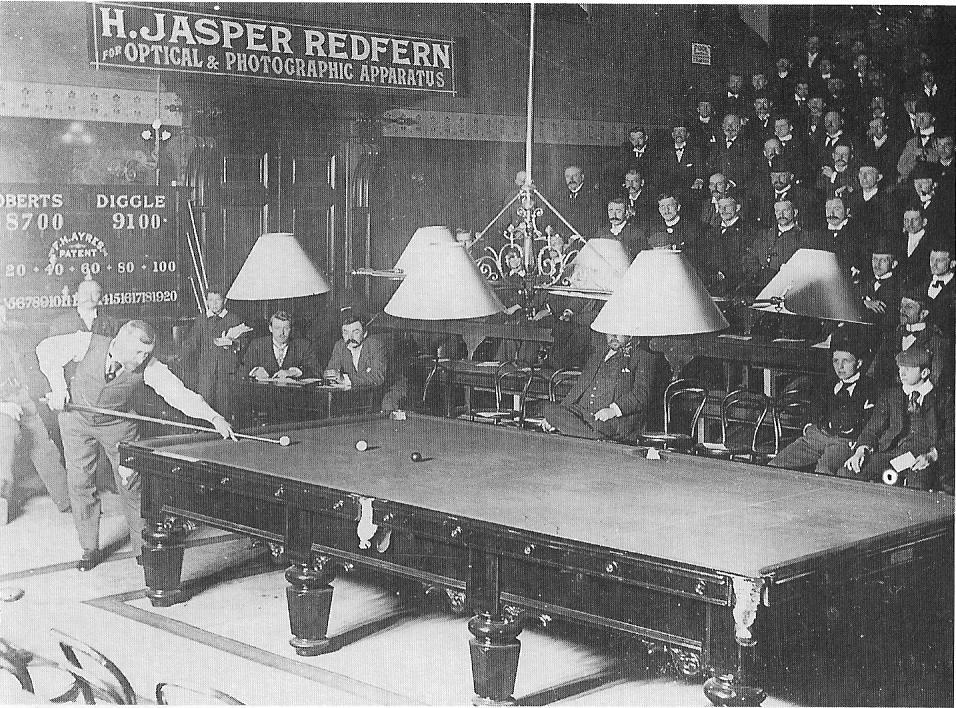
A billiards match between Roberts and Edward Diggle.

On 20 December 1875, at St James's Hall, he defeated Cook by 135 points to win the championship. The match was witnessed by the Prince of Wales.

Another victory for Roberts was achieved on 28 May 1877, with a 1,000–779 win over Cook at the Gaiety Restaurant, Strand, London.

Roberts challenged Cook for the title and was declared champion in February 1885 by default, without a game being played because Cook failed to respond to the challenge within the required time of two months. But then Cook challenged Roberts for the title, and this was promptly accepted. Roberts had been suffering from an attack of Malaria which had stopped him being able to practice a week before the match, and he was hobbling around the table during play. But he beat Cook by a margin of 92 points, on 1 April 1885 at the Argyll Billiard Hall in London.

He won the last of his championships in a match that took place between 1–4 June 1885 at the Royal Aquarium. John Roberts beat Joseph Bennett 3,000–1,360.

== Formation of the billiards association ==
In 1885, Roberts was among many players who sat at the meetings that formed the Billiards Association, and helped to code a new set of rules for the game of English billiards.

== Championship rift ==
William Peall and Billy Mitchell became the leading "all-in" players in the era. This meant that there was no restriction to the number of spot strokes, or direct consecutive pots of the red, allowed from the billiard spot. In an attempt to limit the spot stroke, the "Championship" table was introduced, which had the pocket openings reduced to three inches. This was mainly for use in professional matches. But was later regarded as a failed experiment. John Roberts had been playing the spot-barred version of the game in exhibition matches since 1885.

Roberts did not challenge either Peall or Billy Mitchell for the championship. From around 1890 until 1898, on at least ten separate occasions, Peall challenged John Roberts to a match on even terms at the ordinary ("all-in") game of English billiards. On each occasion Roberts declined to accept, stating that he found that version of the game uninteresting. Roberts wanted to play for the Championship on a "Championship" table with smaller pockets. But Peall did not. John Roberts also objected to Peall styling himself as Champion of English billiards, because he believed ordinary billiards was the spot-barred game. On 14 January 1889, at the Royal Aquarium, Mitchell became the "spot stroke champion" and made an unfinished break of 987 against Peall that contained 319 pots. Roberts and many others, realised the damage that breaks such as this may have caused to the sport, by making it tiresome and monotonous for spectators to watch. Peall agreed that the spot stroke had been rendered monotonous by some of the best professionals. But in 1891 he believed this was not a reason for the stroke to be abolished, because it was a legitimate stroke, and did not want amateurs to be barred from playing it. However, he did later realise that the stroke was doing harm to the game and changed his mind.

At a meeting on 28 April 1891, to reconcile both parties the Billiards Association decided to create two championships, one for all-in, and another for spot-barred. But Roberts declined to play in either, and toured South Africa and Australia in 1891. The association also standardised the dimensions of a billiard table, setting templates for pocket openings to three and a half inches. Both championships were held in 1892, and played on the new standard tables. The all-in championship was called the Billiard Championship.

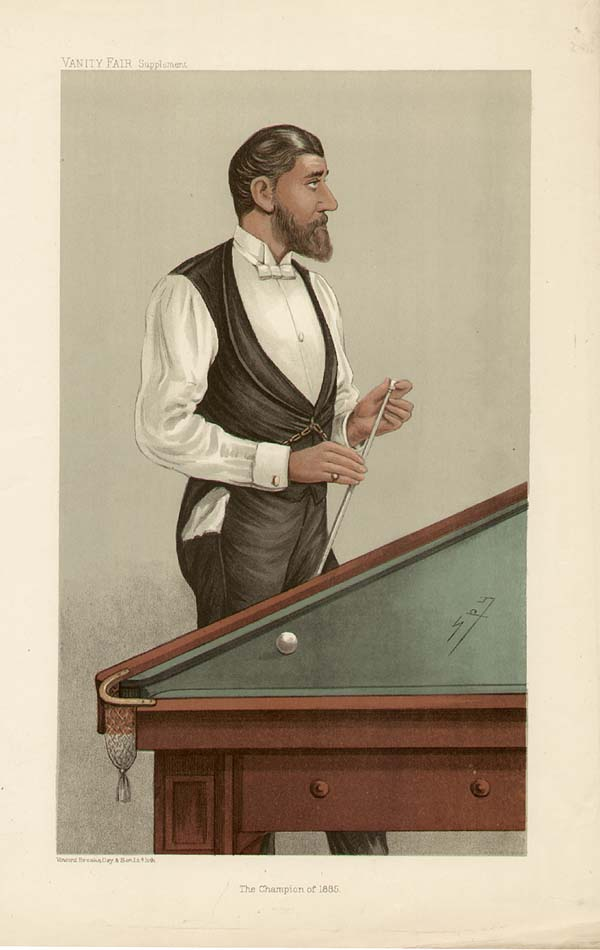
Caricature of John Roberts Jr, by "Spy", Vanity Fair, 4 April 1885.

The Billiards Association eventually bowed to public opinion and abolished the push stroke. They also brought in a ruling stating that if the red ball was potted twice in succession directly by the same player from the billiard spot, it should be placed on the centre spot. These rules came into force on 1 October 1898. But John Roberts still did not take part in the 1899 championship, which was won by Charles Dawson against John North and finished on 14 January.

== Match against Charles Dawson ==
On 25 October 1898, Charles Dawson challenged John Roberts to a match of 18,000 up under the new rules, on a standard table, in a neutral hall, under neutral management for £100 a side, and the gate money to go with the stakes if desired. In November 1898, John Roberts suggested bonzoline balls to be used for the match as it was not a championship one, and ivory balls were only used in championship games. But Dawson suggested ivory balls to be used, because he had not heard of a big money match being played with bonzoline balls. They could not come to an agreement, so both players left the final decision to the Billiard Association committee. The association decided that ivory balls should be used, because although the match was not for the championship, they regarded it to be important enough to be played for using ivory balls. And so Roberts agreed and the challenge from Dawson was accepted. Roberts won against Charles Dawson by 1,814 points, in a match lasting over two weeks, finishing on 3 April 1899. He was awarded £2,254 for the victory. This amount included £100 plus the gate receipts after expenses were deducted.

== Playing for royalty ==
In 1878 he toured India and knowing that Ram Singh II, Maharajah of Jaipur was a fan, he travelled to meet him. Roberts ended up with an annual salary of £500 after being appointed "Court Billiard Player" by the Maharajah on 11 February 1878. This was paid to Roberts until Ram Singh II died in September 1880. He was also given a diamond studded gold enamelled cup and saucer, and 1,000 rupees.

== Other tours ==
He made many tours of Australia and New Zealand, in 1876 playing a series of matches against South Australian champion Herman A. Albers. Other opponents included theatre manager Samuel Lazar. During one tour of Australia and New Zealand, he played several exhibition matches with playing partner Billy Weston (1847–1935), an Australasian champion. In 1900 he lost to Fred Weiss by 890 points in Melbourne. It was a match of the first to 21,000, with Roberts conceding a 7,000 start. James Joynton Smith (later Sir Joynton and Lord Mayor of Sydney), was instrumental in arranging the match.

Roberts went on a tour of North America in 1893, playing the American champion Frank Ives, at the Central Music Hall Chicago in September. Ives ended up winning the match with a score of 6,000 to Roberts 5,303. A return match held in New York City which was the first to 10,000 points finished on 8 October, and resulted in a victory to John Roberts by 1,150 points. The match was played at the Lenox Lyceum.

== In legal history ==
Roberts was the plaintiff in Roberts v. Gray, an important case in English law concerning the capacity of minors to conclude contracts.

== Death ==
He died at Worthing on the morning of 23 December 1919, after having been in poor health for some time.
