= Billy Mitchell (billiards player) =

Player of English billiards

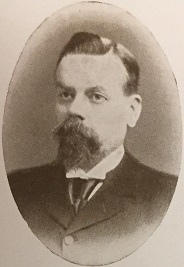
- Born: 13 October 1854; Birchinlee, Derbyshire
- Died: 21 March 1931 (aged 76); Fir Vale Hospital, Sheffield
- Sport country: England
- World Billiards Champion: 1887, 1889, 1892, 1893, 1894

Billy Mitchell (13 October 1854 – 21 March 1931) born as William Mitchell was an English player of English billiards.

== Biography ==
Mitchell was born on 13 October 1854 at Birchinlee in Derbyshire.

He became a marker, a role that involved keeping the score of billiards matches, at the Angel Hotel, Sheffield, at the age of 13. He later worked at Bradleys, a billiard room in Scarborough, and started playing matches for money at the age of 15. In 1882, he made the first four-figure break seen in public, a 1,055 against William Peall.

In October 1887, Peall and Mitchell played at the Royal Aquarium in a 15,000-up match advertised as the "All-in Championship." Despite this billing, it was not actually recognised by the recently formed Billiard Association as a championship match. On the last day, Mitchell was almost 2,000 points behind Peall, but with a series of breaks including 801 and 912, recovered to win the match 15,000–13,733. The second of these unofficial matches was staged in March 1888 at the same venue, and this time Peall won by a large margin, 15,000–6,753, including a record break of 2,031.

Mitchell won the first of three "Championship of the World" tournaments promoted from 1889 to 1891 by billiard table manufacturers George Wright and Company, finishing behind Peall in the other two.

During his career, Mitchell compiled over 1,000 four-figure breaks the highest being a 1,620 which included 536 consecutive pots of the red from the spot.

He died on 21 March 1931 at the Fir Vale Hospital, Sheffield.
