= Thomas Rees =

Thomas Rees may refer to:

== Religious figures ==
- Thomas Rees (Congregational minister) (1815–1885), Welsh Congregationalist minister
- Thomas Rees (theologian) (1869–1926), Welsh theologian and editor, principal of Bala-Bangor Independent College, see 1926 in Wales
- Thomas Rees (Unitarian) (1777–1864), Welsh Unitarian minister and scholar

== Sportspeople ==
- Tom Rees (rugby union, born 1913) (1913–1991), Welsh international rugby union prop
- Tom Rees (rugby union, born 1984), rugby union footballer of the 2000 and 2010s for England, and London Wasps
- Tommy Rees (rugby) (1904–1968), rugby union and rugby league footballer of the 1920s and 1930s
- Tommy Rees (American football) (born 1992), American football quarterback

== Military figures ==
- Tom Rees (aviator) (1895–1916), first man killed by the "Red Baron"
- Thomas Wynford Rees (1898–1959), British Indian Army general
- Thomas H. Rees, officer in the United States Army

== Others ==
- T. Ifor Rees (Thomas Ifor Rees, 1890–1977), Welsh diplomat and translator
- Thomas M. Rees (1925–2003), U.S. Representative from California
- Thomas Rees (Twm Carnabwth) (1806–1876), Welsh leader of the Rebecca Riots, also known as Twm Carnabwth
- Tom Rees (evangelist) (1911–1970), English evangelist
- Thomas ap Rees (1930–1996), botanist
- Thomas Rees (mayor) (1844–1921), master builder and mayor of Brisbane, Queensland, Australia
- Thomas D. Rees, American plastic surgeon and flying doctor

== See also ==
- Thomas J. Reese (born 1945), Jesuit author
- Tommy Reis (1914–2009), American baseball player
