= Leslie Driffield =

English world champion billiards player (1912–1988)

- Born: 1912
- Died: 1988 (aged 76)
- Sport country: England
- World Billiards Champion: 1971, 1973

Leslie Driffield (1912–1988) was an English world champion player of English billiards. He won the World Amateur Billiards Championship title twice, in 1952 and 1967; and the Billiards and Snooker Control Council version of the world professional championship, played on a challenge basis, in 1971 and 1973.

== Early career and English Amateur Championship title ==
Driffield started playing billiards aged 12, and was making century breaks by 13. His day job was as an executive at an Ellerby Foundry Ltd in Leeds, where his father was chairman. He learnt on a 6x3 foot table at home, then played and practised at the YMCA for 23 years, before winning his first English Amateur Championship title. He was coached by George Nelson, and won the Yorkshire Championship in 1937, 1938, 1950, and 1951, and the Leeds Championship in 1949.

In the 1952 English Amateur Championship final against Herbert Beetham, a mineral water manufacturer, Driffield was 98 points behind when his cue tip came off and he had to use his reserve cue. In his first six visits using the reserve cue he scored a total of only 31 points, compared to his average score per visit of 36.4 in the previous session. Beetham increased his lead to 271, but Driffield fought back, with the help of a 142 break, to be 174 behind at the end of that session. At the end of the match, Driffield was the victor by 101 points, 2,894–2,793.

== World Amateur Championship ==
Following an appeal by the Billiards and Snooker Control Council (B&SCC) for funds to send Driffield to Calcutta for the 1952 world championship, he travelled to India a couple of weeks before the competition began. He was the only player in the competition to win all of his matches, netting 8,538 points for, and 4,254 against, and took the title. Before leaving India, he won the all-India Billiards Championship, beating fellow world championship competitor Walter Ramage of Scotland by 3002–2256, and also won the all-India snooker championship. He left the original trophies in India because of the possible customs problems involved in returning them, and took replica trophies back to the United Kingdom. Between winning the English and World titles, Driffield lost the Yorkshire title that he had been attempting to defend.

In 1958, having won further English Amateur titles, Driffield was the world championship runner-up to Wilson Jones.

Following his English Amateur title victory in 1967, Driffield played at the 1967 world championship in Colombo and was, as in 1952, the only unbeaten player, and the champion.

== BA&CC World title and WPBSA breakaway ==
Driffield was a member of the Billiards Association and Control Council, and was present at the meeting where the Council nominated him as the challenger to Rex Williams for the professional Billiards Championship. Williams declined to play Driffield within the five months' time limit that the B&SCC Council had set, which expired on 7 July 1970, and forfeited the title, which was then contested between Driffield and Jack Karnehm. Driffield beat Karnehm 9,029–4,342 in June 1971, in a match not recognised by most professional players. Meanwhile, on 12 December 1970, the Professional Billiard Players Association, which had been reestablished in 1968 by Williams and seven other players, changed its name to the World Professional Billiards and Snooker Association and declared itself the governing body for the professional game, recognising Williams as champion.

Driffield retained his title against Albert Johnson of Australia by 9,204–4,946 in January 1973. He also won a tournament in 1972 called the World Open, beating Paddy Morgan 3,055–2,404 in a ten-hour final.

== Personal life ==
Driffield was known for his concentration and tenacity as a player. During the Second World War he was a captain in the Royal Engineers. He was married to Pia, and had three daughters, Barbara, Gitte and Jytte, and a son, Peter Leslie. Driffield died in 1988, aged 76.

== Career highlights ==
- English Amateur billiards champion 1952, 1953, 1954, 1957, 1958, 1959, 1962, 1967
- 1952 World Amateur Billiards Champion
- 1958 World Amateur Billiards Championship runner-up
- 1967 World Amateur Billiards Champion
- 1971 World Professional Billiards Champion (Challenge basis, Billiards and Snooker Control Council)
- 1973 World Professional Billiards Champion (Challenge basis, Billiards and Snooker Control Council)
