= Thomas Reese =

Thomas Reese may refer to:

- Thomas J. Reese (born 1945), Jesuit priest and journalist
- Thomas S. Reese, neuroscientist, member of the National Academy of Sciences
- Tom Reese (cricket historian) (1867–1949), New Zealand cricketer

== See also ==
- Tom Reese (disambiguation)
