= Edwin Kentfield =

Champion player of English billiards

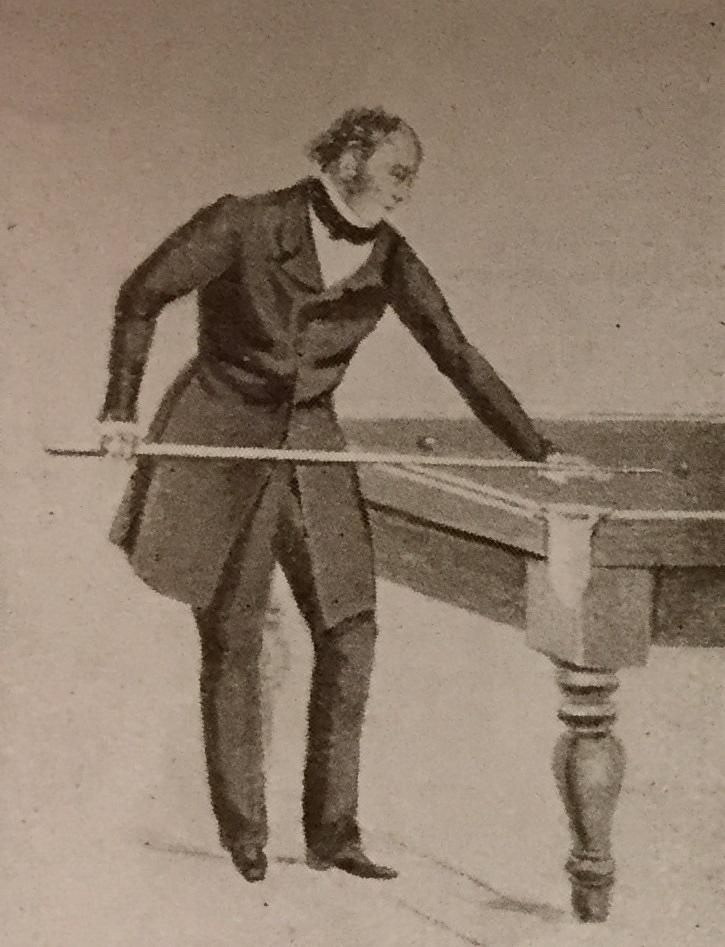
- Born: 11 January 1802
- Died: Brighton, Sussex, England
- Sport country: England
- World Billiards Champion: 1825 (declared)

Edwin Kentfield (11 January 1802 – 29 August 1873) also known as Jonathan Kentfield, was an English player of English billiards. He claimed the Billiards Championship in 1825 and held it uncontested until 1849.

== Biography ==
Edwin Kentfield was born at Brighton in 1802. In about 1815, John Carr, better known as Jack Carr, took a job as a billiard marker, a role that involved keeping the score of billiards matches. In this role, he learned how to play billiards with the use of side, which was at that time almost unknown. He successfully played challenge matches for money, to the extent that by 1825 he had backers for him to play for 100 guineas a side against any challenger.

In 1825 Kentfield challenged Carr, but Carr was too ill to play, and Kentfield assumed the title of Champion, for which he was unchallenged for 24 years.

Kentfield authored a book on billiards, which was published in 1839

In 1849, John Roberts Sr sought to challenge Kentfield for the title, and when Kentfield declined to play, Roberts took the title of champion.

Kentfield ran a billiards club in Brighton, which was offered for sale at auction in 1864 following his bankruptcy. He died on 29 August 1873.

Kentfield's highest break was 196.
