= Billy Weston =

Australasian billiards champion

William Weston (1847 – 13 August 1935) was an Australasian billiards champion and was an early teacher of former world champion, Walter Lindrum. He toured Australia and New Zealand as playing partner to John Roberts Jr. when Roberts visited Australia.

== Early years ==
Weston was born in Middle End Street, Longton, Staffordshire, England, in 1847 and came to Australia with his parents at the age of three. Growing up in Richmond, at the age of 15 he left to find work at Woods Point, Victoria, delivering bread to the miners at the Morning Star reef gold mine and it was in the Reefers Hotel in Woods Point he first played billiards. He toured playing billiards through Victoria and New South Wales when in May 1872, a W. Hitchins was reported to be the best billiard player in Australia. He was offering 400 and 500 in 1000 and Weston, now at the age of 25, challenged him against all odds and to everyone's surprise, beat him after an exciting game.

== Billiards career ==
Weston then travelled through New South Wales and Victoria as champion of New South Wales, visiting many principal towns of both states, playing exhibition games and engaging in billiard competitions before moving to New Zealand where he set up a billiard saloon in Dunedin, becoming a champion there and then Australasian champion.

Arriving in Coolgardie, Western Australia, in 1894, he set up a billiard saloon in Ford Street and a carrying and forwarding agents business in Sylvester Street. His champion horse team of 5 bays bay (horse) won the world record for drawing 9 ton 12 cwt on a bush road from Coolgardie to Kalgoorlie distance of 26 miles in 11 hours on 4 September 1896 returning to Coolgardie on 6 September 1896.

His contemporary agents were J. Flammery & Co, Henderson & Co, Clime, Eastwood & Co and others, all participated with Weston in transporting merchandise to the outback. These firms carried many swampers who were eagerly pushing to newer goldfields farther north such as Menzies, Leonora, Mount Margaret, Mount Morgans and Erlston.

A year after the extension of the railway line, Weston moved his billiard saloon and timber residence to Kalgoorlie where he opened his billiard saloon and tobacconists shop on the corner of Brookman and Wilson Streets. When Walter Lindrum, who was born in Kalgoorlie, was a boy, he used to visit Weston's billiard saloon and Weston took the future world champion around the table teaching him shots, in particular top of the table, a method to increase breaks. He maintained his businesses until his death on 13 August 1935 and is buried in the Kalgoorlie Cemetery.
