= Charles Dawson (billiards player) =

English world champion billiards player

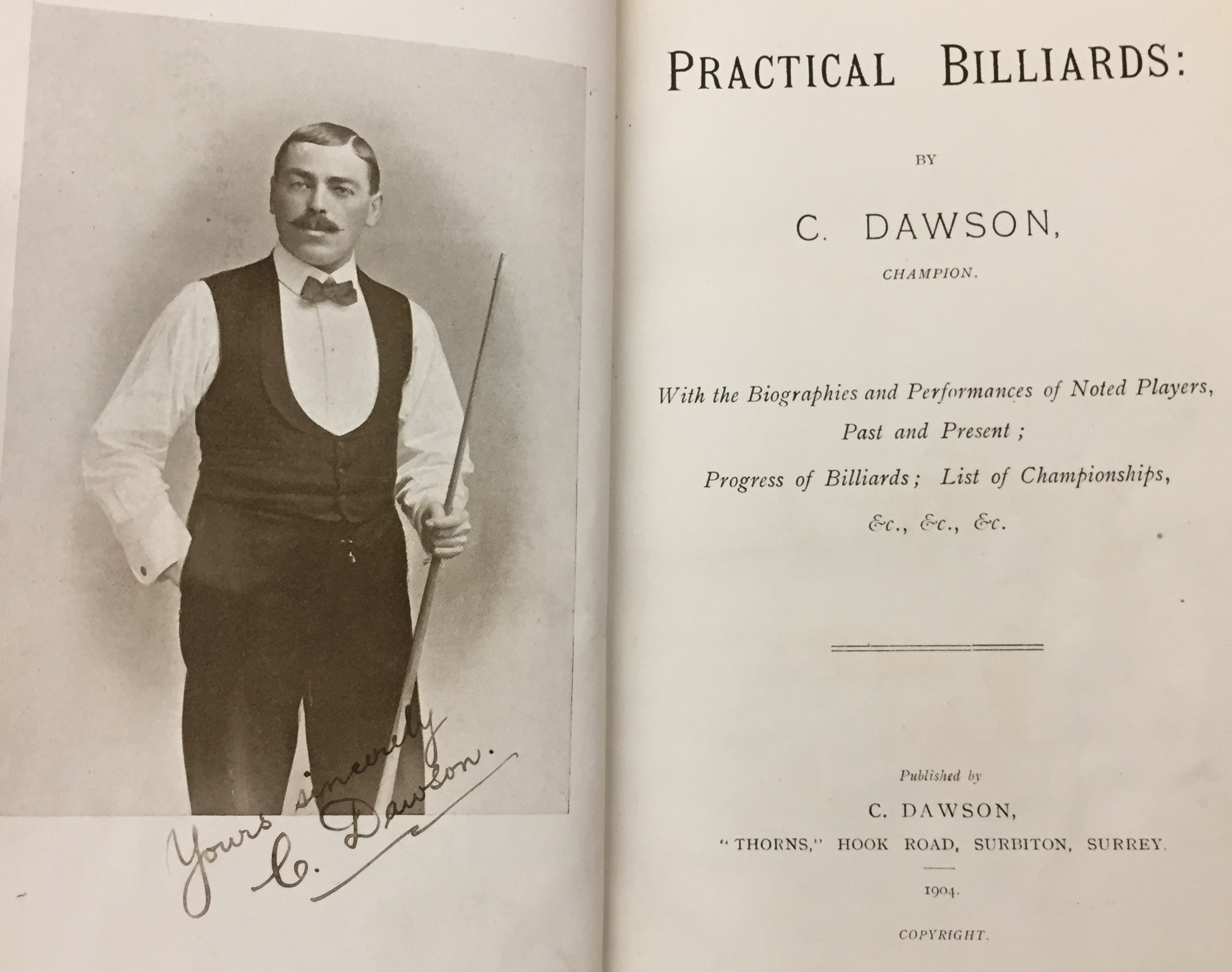
- Dawson pictured in his 1904 book Practical Billiards
- Born: 20 December 1866; Huddersfield
- Died: 16 July 1921 (aged 54)
- Sport country: England
- World Billiards Champion: 1899, 1900, 1901, 1903

Charles Raynor Dawson (20 December 1866 – 16 July 1921) was an English champion player of English billiards. He held the world professional title in billiards in 1899, 1900, 1901 and 1903, when it was held on a challenge basis.

== Biography ==
Dawson was born in Huddersfield in 1866. He worked in the weaving trade before becoming manager of the George and Dragon Hotel in Huddersfield in 1887, where he learnt to play billiards to a high standard He played matches for money before challenging for the world championship title.

Dawson won the billiards title against John North in 1899, but the match attracted little attention as leading player John Roberts Jr. was not involved.

In 1900, H. W. Stevenson and Edward Diggle challenged Dawson for the Billiards Association title. Stevenson beat Diggle in the preliminary round, compiling a break of 648 in the match, but lost 6,775–9,000 to Dawson.

In January 1901, Stevenson beat Dawson to win the title, but Dawson then won it back in April. Following the April match, Stevenson challenged Dawson again. The match was due to be played within three months of the challenge being made, but both players agreed to a postponement until November. Although Dawson was aware that the match was due to be played in November, he organised an exhibition match with Diggle in Glasgow for that month and was unavailable for the championship match. Stevenson refused a further extension, and was awarded the title.

Dawson and Stevenson contested the title again in 1903, with Dawson winning a close match 9,000–8,700. Following this, the championship was not contested for several years. In 1908, the Billiards Association declared Melbourne Inman the champion.

In 1904, Dawson published a book called "Practical Billiards," which included player biographies. He won the snooker competition of the 1908 American Tournament at Burroughes Hall.

His highest break at billiards, excluding the anchor stroke, was 823.

He retired from playing in 1909, due to failing eyesight, and later died in Storthes Hall Asylum, Huddersfield on 16 July 1921.

== World Professional Billiards Titles ==
- January 1899, beat John North 9,000–4,715
- April 1900, beat H. W. Stevenson 9,000–6,775
- April 1901, beat H. W. Stevenson9,000–5,796
- March 1903, beat H. W. Stevenson 9,000–8,700

=== Snooker Titles: (2) ===
- 1907 Bonzoline Manchester Tournament
- 1908 American Tournament
