= Tom Rees (evangelist) =

Thomas Bonner Rees (died 21 April 1970) was an English Christian evangelist. He founded the Hildenborough evangelistic conference center in 1945. His widow Jean wrote a biography "His Name was Tom".
