= Joseph Bennett (billiards player) =

Champion player of English billiards

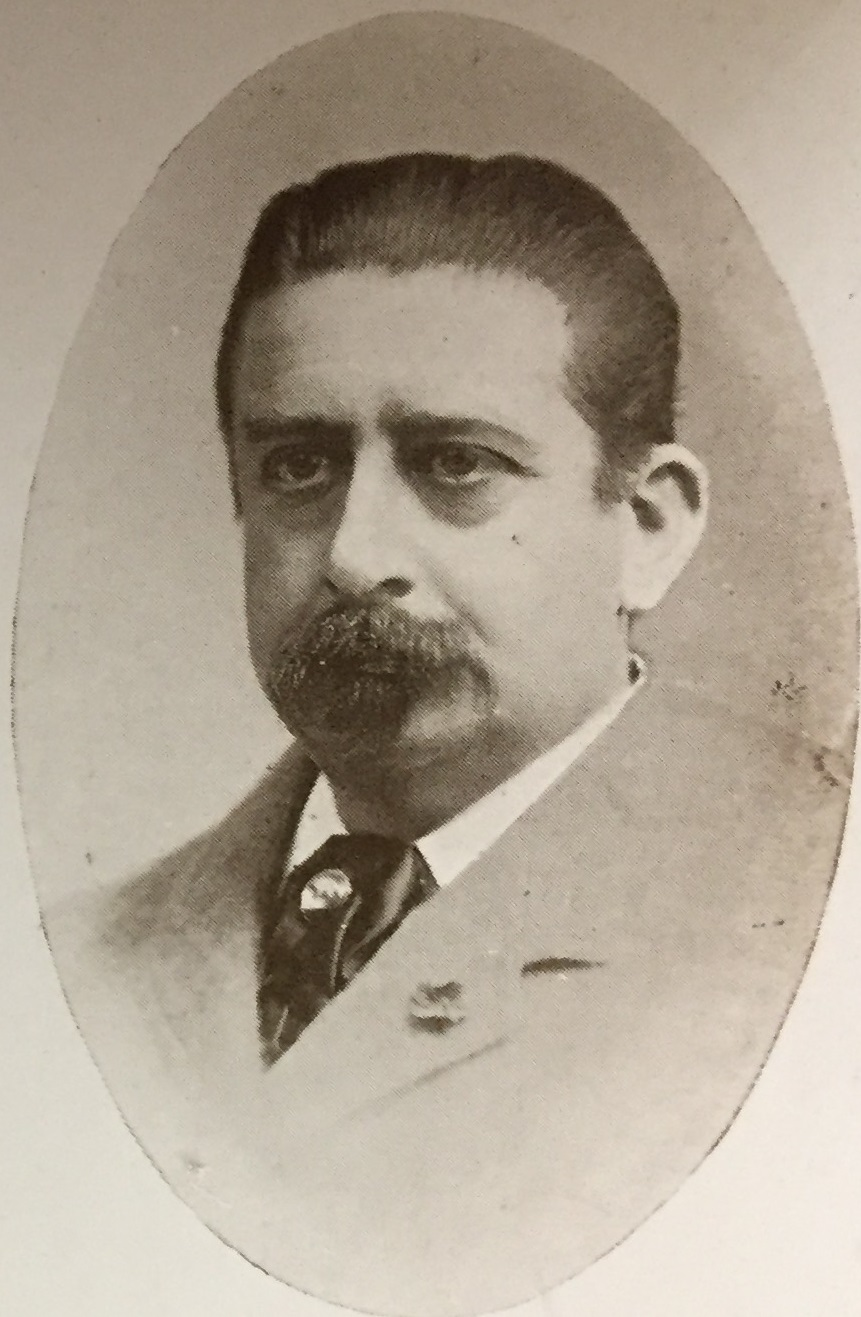

Personal information
- Born: 1842 Town Malling, Kent
- Died: 17 January 1905 (aged 63) Mayfair, London

Sport
- Country: England
- Sport: Snooker

Joseph Bennett (1842-1905) was an English champion player of English billiards. He was the billiards champion three times when it was played on a challenge basis.

== Biography ==
Bennett was born in 1842 in Town Malling, Kent, and played his first billiards match aged 22.

In November 1870, Bennett played John Roberts Jr. for the Billiards Championship and £200, and won the title with the scoreline 1,000-905. The match was watched by over 300 spectators. Roberts beat Bennett 1,000-637 the following year, in January 1871, to regain the title.

Bennett made a further unsuccessful title challenge in November 1871, losing 942–1,000 to William Cook, but won the title again in November 1880, beating Cook 1,000-949. Bennett successfully defended the title in January 1881, beating Tom Taylor 1,000-910. During the match against Taylor, Bennett set a new championship record break of 125.

In September 1881, Bennett, who had broken his arm when being thrown out of a gig, resigned the title when challenged by Cook. He made one further unsuccessful challenge for the title, losing 1,360-3,000 against Roberts in June 1885.

He taught billiards in London. Following a stroke on Christmas Day 1904, he died on 17 January 1905 at his home in Mayfair, London, from "apoplexy following a state of paralysis." He is buried at Brompton cemetery.

== Titles won ==
- 28 November 1870, 1,000–905 against John Roberts, Jr.
- 8 November 1880, 1,000–949 against William Cook
- 12–13 January 1881, 1,000–910 against Tom Taylor

== In fiction ==
Bennett is briefly mentioned in Flashman at the Charge (1973) by George MacDonald Fraser.
