= Jack Carr (billiards player) =

19th-century English billiards player

John Carr was an English player of English billiards. He was known as an early exponent of the use of side in billiards, and for playing billiards matches for money in the 19th century.

== Biography ==
In about 1815, Carr took a job as a billiard marker at the Upper Rooms in Bath, a role that involved keeping the score of billiards matches. In this role, his employer John Bartley taught Carr how to play billiards with the use of side, which was at that time was a rare skill. Carr would conceal his method by seemingly aiming at the centre of the cue ball and only changing to strike to the side of the cue ball when actually playing the shot. Carr would claim that these shots were possible due to the use of a special "twisting chalk," which he would sell for half a crown a box. The boxes actually contained normal chalk.

Carr successfully played challenge matches for money, but lost most of his winnings through gambling. He had a successful playing tour in Spain playing the Spanish version of billiards, but, as he had in England, soon lost most of the proceeds.

Carr’s success in challenge matches for money led to him having backers for him to play for 100 guineas a side against any challenger by 1825.

In 1825 Kentfield challenged Carr, but Carr was too ill to play, and Kentfield assumed the title of Champion, for which he was unchallenged for 24 years.
