= The Badminton Magazine of Sports and Pastimes =

British sports magazine

The Badminton Magazine of Sports and Pastimes was a sports magazine published between 1895 and 1923, and edited by A. E. T. Watson. The magazine was headquartered in London. It had ten different names during its lifetime, nine publishers, and seven printers.

A detailed history, index and bibliography has been written by Chris Harte. It is of 406 pages and contain photographs of most of the magazines writers and illustrators. It was published in mid-August 2021.

The series of forty-six tales called 'Strange Stories of Sport' which were published in the magazine between 1906 and 1909 have been republished in book form. The compiler is Chris Harte. The book is of 508 pages and was released in October 2021.

== See also ==
- Badminton Library
