= Billiards and Snooker Control Council =

Former governing body for snooker and English billiards

- Sport: Snooker and English billiards
- Jurisdiction: International
- Abbreviation: B&SCC
- Founded: 1919 (as the Billiards Association and Control Council)
- Headquarters: United Kingdom
- Chairman: Bob Tonge (last chairman)
- Replaced: Formed as an amalgamation of the Billiards Association (founded 1895) and the Billiards Control Club (founded 1908)
- Closure date: 1992

The Billiards and Snooker Control Council (B&SCC) (formerly called the Billiards Association and Control Council (BA&CC)) was the governing body of the games of English billiards and snooker and organised professional and amateur championships in both sports. It was formed in 1919 by the union of the Billiards Association (founded in 1885) and the Billiards Control Club (founded in 1908).

The B&SCC lost control of both the amateur and professional games in the early 1970s, following a dispute with professional players over challenge matches for the World Billiards Championship, and dissatisfaction from snooker associations outside the UK about the balance of voting power in the organisation, with a large proportion of votes being held in a small number of English areas. Following the loss of its government funding, the B&SCC went into voluntary liquidation in 1992 and its assets were later acquired by the World Professional Billiards and Snooker Association.

== The Billiard Association ==
On 31 January 1885, a meeting took place at The Sportsman's offices to consider revising the rules of billiards, chaired by a Mr. A. H. Collins-Orme and attended by the majority of the prominent professional billiards players. This followed an article written by journalist Alf Burnett criticising the existing rules. Burnett and Peter Jennings contacted the players with a view to getting together to rewrite the rules.

Collins-Orme proposed that an association be created. This was agreed, and "The Billiard Association of Great Britain and Ireland, India and the Colonies" (known as the Billiard Association) was formed. Ten players were tasked with authoring a new set of rules for English billiards. They were John Roberts Jr. (Chairman), Joseph Bennett, Fred Bennett, George Collins, William Cook, John Roberts Sr., Billy Mitchell, John North, W. J. Peall, Joe Sala and Tom Taylor. The group met weekly in a dining area at the Royal Aquarium, and finished writing the rules on 21 September 1886. The rules were published soon after that. Sydenham Dixon, a staff member at The Sportsman was the driving force behind the formation of the Billiards Association, and the newspaper retained a strong influence over the association's affairs. The influence of the paper over the Association later led to prominent player John Roberts Jr. (who became the Billiards Champion in February 1885 when Cook failed to respond to Roberts' challenge for the title) refusing to recognise the Association's authority.

The Association came to be recognised as the governing body for billiards, and organised amateur and professional championships. They also produced templates for standard pocket sizes, which tables had to conform to if breaks made on them were to be recognised in official records. The March 1885 match between John Roberts Jr. and Cook, which Roberts won 3,000–2,980 was the first to be held under the rules of the Association. An amateur championship under the "all in" rules, with no restrictions on the number of consecutive scoring shots that could be played, was organised by the Association in 1892, when Sam Christey beat Sidney Fry 1,500–928. The competition was restricted to players from Great Britain before 1917, which was the first year that champions from other Commonwealth countries were allowed to enter. From 1926, only English and Welsh players were allowed to participate, and the event was renamed the English Amateur Championship. The first snooker competition organised by the Billiard Association was the English Amateur Championship of 1916, which was played to benefit the British Sportsmen's Motor Ambulance Fund.

== Billiards Control Council and amalgamation ==
The Billiards Association's control over the professional game of billiards was challenged by the Billiards Control Council (BCC), formed in 1908, which issued a different set of rules. The key differences in the BCC's version were that a player could not make more than two miss shots successively, and a simpler explanation of penalties. The professional players changed their allegiance to the newer Control Council, and the professional championships were played under BCC rules, whilst most amateurs continued to play under Billiards Association rules. The two organisations decided that it was in their mutual interest to amalgamate, and formed the Billiards Association and Control Club, later renamed the Billiards Association and Control Council (BA&CC), in 1919. Willie Smith defeated Claude Falkiner 16,000–14,500 to win the first BA&CC title, in May 1920. There were many variations of the rules of snooker at the time, and the new Association codified the rules of snooker in 1919. The new rules included the concept of a re-spotted black in the event of points being level at the end of a frame, and having a free ball instead of playing from in hand when there was no clear shot at the object ball after a foul.

Professional billiard player and billiard hall manager Joe Davis had noticed the increasing popularity of snooker in the mid-1920s, and Davis and Birmingham billiard equipment manager Bill Camkin persuaded the Billiards Association and Control Council to recognise an official professional snooker championship in the 1926–27 season. The final of the first snooker world championship in 1927 was held at Camkin's Hall, and Davis won the tournament by beating Tom Dennis 20–11 (although Davis had reached the winning margin at 16–7 before "dead frames" were played to take the total to the agreed 31 frames) in the final.

In 1935, the Women's Billiards Association (WBA) affiliated to the BA&CC and on 10 June 1936, the Billiards Association and Control Council agreed to take over management of the WBA. Lord Lonsdale, president of the BA&CC, also became president of the WBA.

== Loss of control of the professional game ==
'The Billiards & Snooker Control Council is the world governing body of games played on a billiards table and it has the responsible task of administering on an extremely large scale.'

— The Billiards and Snooker Control Council Handbook and Rules (1971)

Leslie Driffield, a member of the BA&CC Council, was present at a meeting where the Council nominated him as the challenger to Rex Williams for the professional Billiards Championship. Williams declined to play Driffield within the five months time limit that the BA&CC Council had set, which expired on 7 July 1970, and forfeited the title, which was then contested between Driffield and Jack Karnehm in June 1971. On 1 October 1970, the Professional Billiard Players Association, which had been reestablished in 1968 Williams and seven other players, disaffiliated from the BA&CC. The Professional Billiard Players Association changed its name to the World Professional Billiards and Snooker Association on 12 December 1970, and declared itself the governing body for the professional game, recognising Williams as champion. Driffield and Karnehm were, at first, the only two professionals to recognise the BA&CC as continuing to have authority over the game. From 1972, the WPBSA organised the World Snooker Championship.

The BA&CC had its own premises for the first time in 1970, when it opened offices and a match room, based in Haringey. Vera Selby and Alf Nolan were among the players who took part in exhibition matches at the official opening. On 21 January 1971 the Billiards Association and Control Council changed its name to the Billiards and Snooker Control Council (B&SCC).

== Loss of control of the international amateur game ==
The B&SCC had a proportional representation system of delegate voting that meant that the representatives from just two English counties, Lancashire and Yorkshire, could outvote the rest of the world. A World Billiards and Snooker Council (WB&SC) was established in 1971, following a meeting of a number of national associations at a hotel in Malta during the IBSF World Billiards Championship. The associations were dissatisfied that the B&SCC was controlling both the UK and international games. Player and journalist Clive Everton served as the first secretary, and his office served as the first office of the WB&SC. In 1973, the WB&SC renamed itself as the International Billiards and Snooker Federation (IBSF) and began to control non-professional billiards and snooker championships.

== Decline ==
From 1967 to 1989 the B&SCC had received Sports Council grants, but this was, according to Everton, stopped "on the grounds of limited efficiency", and at the beginning of the 1990s, the B&SCC was struggling financially as a result of the removal of this funding. The London and Home Counties Billiards and Snooker Association cut links with the B&SCC in 1990, to start a new English Billiards and Snooker Federation.

In 1992, the World Professional Billiards and Snooker Association (WPBSA) was expected to take over the B&SCC, but following a vote of the B&SCC members approving this, the WPBSA discovered that the B&SCC had undeclared contingent liabilities of £100,000 and cancelled the planned takeover. The B&SCC then went into voluntary liquidation.

The WPBSA took over the running of tournaments that had been organised by the B&SCC, and paid the prize money originally announced. It also bought the B&SCC's trophies and other assets from the liquidator and ran the amateur game whilst looking to support the establishment of successor bodies to the B&SCC.

== Successor organisations ==
=== International ===
The World Professional Billiards and Snooker Association is responsible for governing professional billiards and snooker, whilst the International Billiards and Snooker Federation governs the amateur game.

=== England ===
The English Partnership for Snooker and Billiards has been the governing body for non-professional snooker in England since June 2019, when a resolution was passed by the English Association of Snooker and Billiards, the previous governing body, to transfer its assets and operations to the EPSB. The English Amateur Billiards Association governs amateur billiards.
