= John Roberts Sr =

English billiards player (1823–1893)

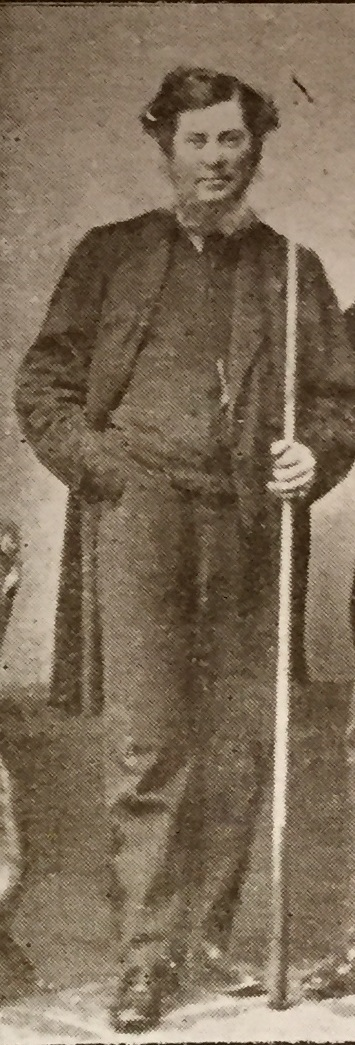
- Born: 12 June 1823; Liverpool, England
- Died: 27 March 1893 (aged 69); Stratford, London
- Sport country: Wales
- World Billiards Champion: 1849 (declared)

John Roberts Sr (12 June 1823 – 27 March 1893) was a Welsh champion player of English billiards.

== Biography ==
Roberts was born in Liverpool on 12 June 1823 to a Welsh family. Before taking up English billiards, he worked as a carpenter. He managed the Union Club billiards room in Manchester from 1845 to 1852 after spending some time in Oldham as a billiard marker, a role that involved keeping the score of billiards matches. He then became landlord of a hotel, The Griffin.

In 1847, his son John Roberts Jr was born.

Edwin Kentfield, known as Jonathan Kentfield, was the self-declared champion of billiards when Roberts challenged him for the title in 1849. Kentfield declined to play, and so Roberts styled himself as champion, a title he held unchallenged until 1870, when he lost to William Cook.

Roberts embarked on a playing tour of Australia and New Zealand in 1864–65.

In 1885, a meeting took place at The Sportsman's offices to consider revising the rules of billiards, chaired by a Mr A. H. Collins-Orme and attended by the majority of the prominent professional billiards players. The Billiard Association was formed, and ten players, including John Roberts Jr., and Roberts Sr., were tasked with authoring a new set of rules for English billiards.

Roberts died on 27 March 1893 at Stratford, London.

He was sometimes known by the nickname of "Liverpool Jack." His highest recorded break was 346, in 1862. In his playing prime, he could reputedly beat other players who were using a standard cue whilst Roberts used an adapted walking-stick.
