= William Cook (billiards player) =

English champion of English billiards

- William Cook
- Born: 15 June 1849; Sandy, Bedfordshire
- Died: 30 June 1893; Brompton Consumption Hospital
- Sport country: England
- Highest break: 936

William Cook (15 June 1849 – 30 June 1893) was a professional player of English billiards in the 19th century. He won the World Championship on five occasions.

William Cook began playing billiards at about the age of eleven, and played a lot with the professional Alfred Bowles. But because he did not leave school until sixteen, and was a chorister at St George's Chapel, Windsor Castle, then later at St Saviour's, Paddington, he could not devote the majority of his time to billiards until 1865.

Cook beat John Roberts Jr, son of the dominant player of the time, John Roberts Sr, in a match in 1869, and then challenged Roberts Sr for the title. As this was the first match for the World Championship, five players, which included Cook, with Roberts taking the chair, formed a committee to draw up a special set of rules for the game. The committee also involved representatives from three leading billiard table manufacturers. The committee were persuaded by Roberts that the highest test of a champion would be a table on which the greatest accuracy was needed when playing pots. Cook was an expert at the spot stroke. The pocket width was reduced to 3–inches (Note: All official matches for the championship up to and including 1885, were played on tables with pockets of this size.) (from the original 3 5/8–in), and the "D" and spots were adjusted so that Cook's spot stroke strength, derived from his proficiency at consecutively potting the red ball from its spot was weakened. Cook was nonetheless considered the favourite, and the 20-year-old had improved much from his win over Roberts Jr the previous year. Before the match he wrote a letter to the Sporting Life, stating that he believed that the smaller pockets would not affect his game. At 1:38 a.m. on the morning of 12 February 1870, Cook defeated Roberts 1,200-1,083 to win the title, and won a newly created trophy, £100 and a Maltese cross. The Prince of Wales attended the match at St. James's Hall. This match ended the dominance of Roberts Sr, as the wave of new players took over the game.

Roberts Sr did not challenge for the championship again. But Cook was to meet his match in the son, John Roberts Jr, who beat him 1,200-552 in a challenge match for the Championship in April 1870. William Cook won the championship on four further occasions between 1871 and 1874, by beating Roberts in three finals, and Joseph Bennett in another. On 24 May 1875 he was beaten again by Roberts, who would go on to dominate billiards for the next thirty years.
