= Royal Aquarium =

Royal Aquarium and Aquarium Theatre
- Imperial Theatre
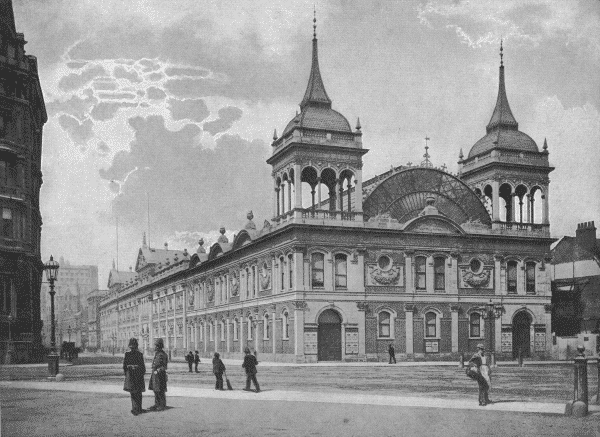
- The Royal Aquarium, c. 1876
- Interactive map of Royal Aquarium and Aquarium Theatre
- Address: Westminster, London
- Coordinates: 51.5°N 0.13°W
- Owner: Royal Aquarium Society
- Capacity: 1,293 (theatre)
- Type: West End theatre and entertainment complex
- Designation: demolished 1903
- Current use: site of Methodist Central Hall Westminster

Construction
- Opened: 22 January 1876
- Closed: 1903
- Rebuilt: 1898 Walter Emden; 1901 Frank Verity
- Architect: Alfred Bedborough

The Royal Aquarium and Winter Garden was a place of amusement in Westminster, London. It opened in 1876, and the building was demolished in 1903. The attraction was located northwest of Westminster Abbey on Tothill Street. The building was designed by Alfred Bedborough in an ornamental style faced with Portland stone. The Aquarium Theatre was located in the west end of the building and was renamed the Imperial Theatre in 1879. Methodist Central Hall now occupies the site.

== History ==
The Royal Aquarium opened on 22 January 1876. Its board of directors included Henry Labouchère, the financier and journalist; William Whiteley the retailer; and Arthur Sullivan, the composer. It was intended to offer art exhibitions, concerts and plays, among other intellectual entertainments such as The Crystal Palace.

The main hall was 340 feet (104 m) long by 160 feet (49 m) wide. A roof of glass and iron covered it. It was decorated with palm trees, fountains, pieces of original sculpture, thirteen large tanks meant to be filled with curious sea creatures and an orchestra capable of accommodating 400 performers. Surrounding the main hall were rooms for eating, smoking, reading and playing chess, as well as an art gallery, a skating rink and a theatre. The Aquarium adopted an expensive system of supplying fresh and sea water from four cisterns sunk into the foundations. The system quickly ran into problems. The large tanks for fish did not contain any. This became a standing joke, but the directors did display a dead whale in 1877.

By the 1890s, the Aquarium acquired a risqué reputation, as unaccompanied ladies promenaded through the hall in search of male companionship. Emily Turner, a visitor from Montreal, worked as a salesgirl at the Aquarium between October 1891 and January 1892. She met a Major Hamilton there, who bought her supper at Gatti's (in the Strand) and took her to entertainments at the Alhambra Theatre, promising to set her up in rooms in Lambeth. The major disappeared after providing her with "gelatin capsules" for a cough. The pills made her ill, and she stopped taking them. The unused pills were passed to Scotland Yard, and she was traced by Inspector Jarvis of the Metropolitan police. He identified the missing major as the serial killer Thomas Neill Cream. The pills were analysed and found to contain only quinine. Turner refused to identify Cream for fear of having to appear at the trial and have her own respectability questioned.

== Entertainments at the Aquarium ==
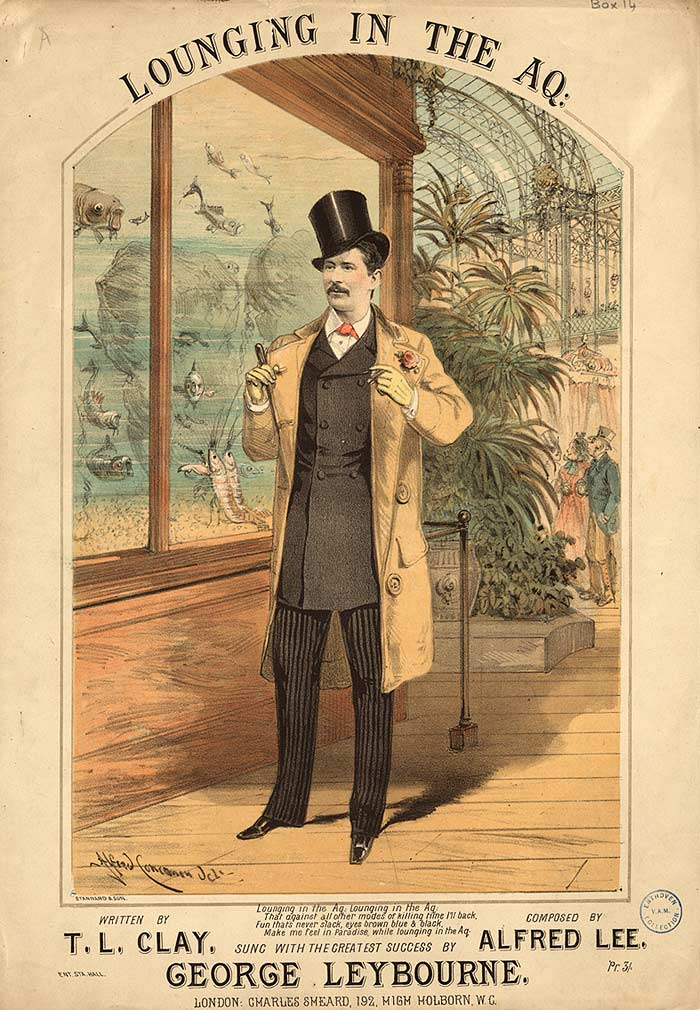
Sheet music cover for Lounging in the Aq. (1880), illustrated by A. Concanen

After its opening, the expensive Aquarium and its programme of art exhibits and classical music were indifferently received by the public, and the venture was failing. Soon, instead of scientific lectures and the high-minded entertainments intended for the hall by its founders, the directors turned to more profitable music hall and variety acts (animal acts, African dancers, hypnotists, etc.) The Aquarium became most famous for offering dangerous and sensational circus and other acts. The showman and tightrope walker The Great Farini programmed many of these beginning in 1877. One of the most famous was the young female human cannonball, Zazel, who was launched by an apparatus of Farini's design. The perceived danger of these acts caused protests and put the venue's licence in doubt but drew crowds.

In 1880, George Leybourne popularised a song about the Aquarium that parodied Alfred Vance's song "Walking in the Zoo":

Lounging in the Aq.,
That against all other modes
Of killing time I'll back.
Fun that's never slack,
Eyes brown, blue, and black
Make one feel in Paradise
While lounging in the Aq.

The all-day variety entertainments at the Aquarium turned less respectable, including billiards matches, novelty acts and side-shows of all kinds, and commercial stalls offering perfumery and gloves. George Robey made his first professional appearance at the Aquarium in 1891. Located across the street from the Houses of Parliament, the Aquarium was popular with members of the House of Commons. The comedian Arthur Roberts also sang a song about the Aquarium:

I strolled one day to Westminster,
The Royal Aquarium to see;
But I had to stand a bottle
just to lubricate the throttle
Of a lady who was forty-three.

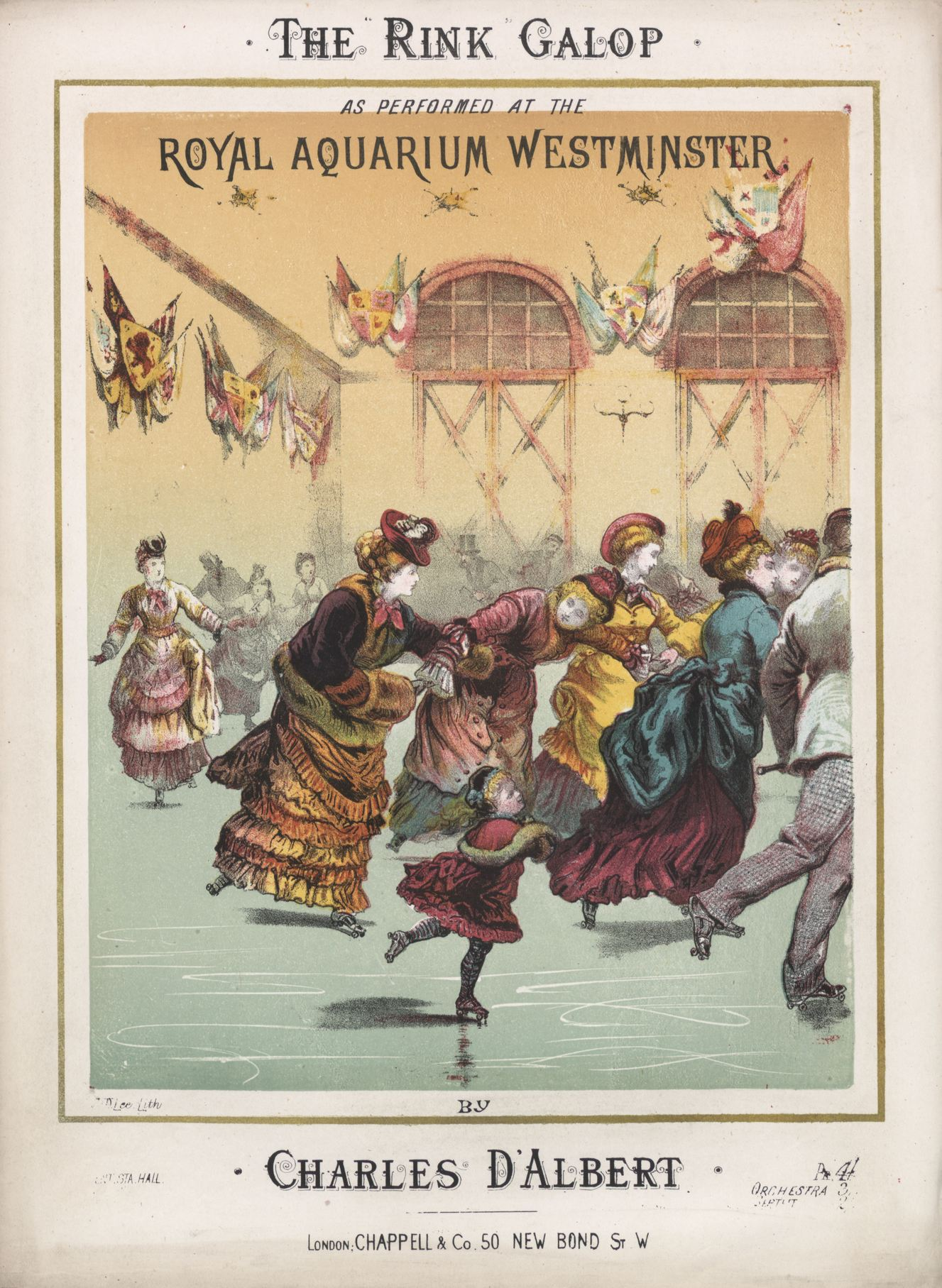
Score of The Rink Gallop as performed inside the Aquarium, c. 1876

== Theatre ==
The Aquarium Theatre at the west end of the Royal Aquarium opened on 15 April 1876. The theatre was also designed by Bedborough and was built by Messrs. Lucas with a capacity of 1,293. Henry Jones (1822-1900) built an unusually large and powerful Grand Organ for the Royal Aquarium under the supervision of Sullivan. The organ was installed at the rear of the main stage in 1876 at the opening of the Hall. In 1878, however, it was moved from the stage to a position up in the gallery.

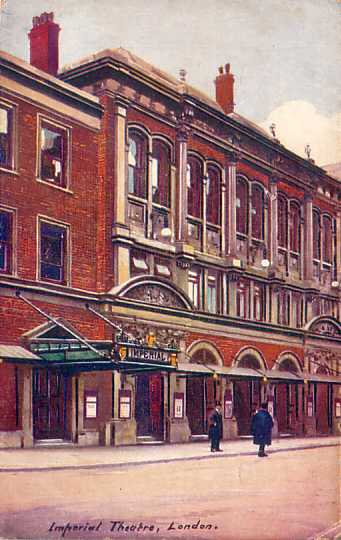
Drawing of the Imperial Theatre

The School for Scandal played at the theatre in 1877, as did a revival of W. S. Gilbert's adaptation of Great Expectations. Samuel Phelps made his last appearance at the theatre in 1878. The farce Fun in a Fog played at the theatre in 1878, and Family Honour by Frank Marshall premiered in the same year. The theatre was named the Imperial Theatre in 1879. The Beaux' Stratagem by George Farquhar, She Stoops to Conquer by Goldsmith and The Poor Gentleman all played at the theatre that year. Shakespeare's As You Like It and Anne Mie, by Roster Faasen, played at the theatre in 1880, as did the comic opera Billee Taylor, composed by Edward Solomon, with a libretto by Henry Pottinger Stephens. Good-Natured Man played in 1881. In 1882, Lillie Langtry appeared at the theatre in Tom Taylor's An Unequal Match. Good as Gold by Matthews Mone, Camille (an English adaptation of Dumas' play) and Auld Robin Gray by George Roy played here in 1883, as did Aurora Floyd, by J. B. Ashley and Cyril Melton, in 1885. A Fast Life by Hubert O'Grady played in 1898.

In 1898, extensive alterations were made to the theatre by Walter Emden, and in 1901 it was rebuilt by Frank Verity for Lillie Langtry, who took over the theatre in 1900. Its capacity was reduced to 1,150, with a stage width of 62 feet (19 m) and depth of 40 feet (12 m). Langtry reopened the theatre in 1901 with Berton's A Royal Necklace. The theatre presented Everyman in 1902 and When We Dead Awaken by Henrik Ibsen in January 1903. George Bernard Shaw's The Admirable Bashville also played here in 1903. Despite the high standard of her productions, the theatre was not successful, and Langtry withdrew in 1903. The theatre hosted His Majesty's Servant in 1904 and The Perfect Lover in 1905.

After the Royal Aquarium was demolished in 1903, the Imperial Theatre continued to stand on the site until it finally closed in 1907 and was pulled down. The interior of the theatre was saved and re-erected as the Imperial Palace in Canning Town in 1909.
