= Accrington F.C. 0–1 Sheffield United F.C. (1893 Football League Test Match) =

Accrington 0–1 Sheffield United
- Event: 1893 Test Match
Accrington	Sheffield United
0	1
- Date: 22 April 1893
- Venue: Trent Bridge, Nottingham
- Attendance: 5,000

The 1892–93 season Test Matches were played on 22 April 1893. Accrington of Division One played Sheffield United of Division Two in a game at Trent Bridge, Nottingham which United won 1–0. A goal from United's Scottish forward John Drummond was enough to clinch victory for the Yorkshire side and saw them promoted to play in the First Division for the following season, with Accrington taking their place in the second.

== Background ==
For the 1892–93 season the Football League was expanded from 14 teams to 28, split between the First Division consisting of sixteen sides and the Second Division comprising a further twelve clubs. To settle the matter of clubs moving between the divisions it was decided to play a series of test matches at the end of the season, with the top three sides from Division Two playing the three sides that had finished bottom of Division One. The winners of each match would be elected to play in Division One for the 1893–94 season, with the losers playing in Division Two.

Accrington had been one of the founder members of the Football League in 1888 but the 1892–93 season was a poor season for them. A lack of consistency and some costly defeats, coupled with a large number of drawn games over the season saw them finish in fifteenth place in the table with only 23 points. Sheffield United had been elected to the Second Division the year before and had made a strong start to their Football League career. They had played consistently all season, only losing three league games, and all of those coming in the season's opening stages. Despite this strong performance they finished the season in second place on 35 points, one point and one place behind Small Heath. The test matches were duly scheduled to take place on Friday 22 April with divisional champions Small Heath taking on the First Division's bottom side Newton Heath, Sheffield United taking on Accrington, and the Second Division's third place team Darwen playing Notts County.

== Match ==
=== Summary ===
The Test Matches were played on a neutral ground, with this game being played at Trent Bridge in Nottingham. Accrington were deemed the 'home' team and wore their traditional kit of a red jersey with blue knickers and socks. Sheffield United played in their red and white striped jersey with blue knickers and socks.

Contemporary reports described the pitch as being in poor condition following a period of wet weather and the muddy conditions hampered the players performance on both sides. After a goalless first half, United forward John Drummond received the ball midway through the second period and embarked on a long solo run before hitting the ball past the Accrington keeper to score the only goal of the game. Drummond would later attribute his performance in the game to painting the soles of his boots with black lead to prevent the mud from sticking, allowing him to be the only player to be able to keep to his feet.

=== Details ===
22 April 1893
15:00

Accrington	0–1	Sheffield United
		Drummond 55'

Trent Bridge, Nottingham
Attendance: 5,000

Accrington	Sheffield United

GK	(England) William Mason
DF	(England) William Hodge
DF	(England) Charlie Ditchfield
DF	(England) W. Bowie
HB	(Scotland) John Stevenson
HB	(England) William Shuttleworth
FW	(England) Tom Lea
FW	(England) Jimmy Whitehead
FW	(England) Harry Cookson
FW	(England) Harry Lea
FW	(England) Jack Kirkham

GK	(England) Charlie Howlett
RB	(England) Michael Whitham
LB	(Scotland) Bob Cain
CH	(England) Rab Howell
CH	(England) Billy Hendry (c)
HB	(England) Ernest Needham
FW	(Scotland) John Drummond
FW	(England) Harry Hammond
FW	(Scotland) Bob Hill
LW	(Scotland) Hugh Gallacher
MF	(England) Arthur Watson
Club secretary:
(England) Joseph Wostinholm

Match rules

- 90 minutes
- No extra-time or penalties
- Replay if drawn at full time

== Aftermath ==
Following their victory, Sheffield United played in the Football League First Division from the 1893–94 season onwards, remaining in the division until 1934, and being crowned champions only five years after being promoted. Accrington on the other hand, refused to play in the Second Division and resigned their membership of the league as a result. Financial problems followed and the team reverted to amateur status before they eventually disbanded in 1896.

The other two Test Matches played on the same day, resulted in promotion for Division Two side Darwen after they beat Notts County 3–2, while Small Heath and Newton Heath played out a 1–1 draw. Ironically, of the Division Two sides, it was only the champions Small Heath who failed to gain promotion after they lost their test match replay against Newton Heath 5–2.
