= 1892–93 Sheffield United F.C. season =

Sheffield United
1892–93 season
- Chairman: Michael Ellison
- Secretary: Joseph Wostinholm
- Division Two: 2nd (promoted via Test Match)
- FA Cup: Second round (eliminated by Sunderland)
- Wharncliffe Charity Cup: Finalists (trophy shared with The Wednesday)
- Top goalscorer: League: Hammond (18); All: Hammond (22)
- Highest home attendance: League: 4,500 (vs Grimsby Town); FA Cup: 14,769 (vs Sunderland)
- Lowest home attendance: 500 (vs Darwen)
Home colours	Away colours

The 1892–93 season was the fourth in existence for Sheffield United. This was their first season playing in the recently formed Football League Second Division as the club sought to establish itself as a major footballing force. With some members of the football committee unconvinced of the long-term future of the Football League, the club also retained its membership of the Northern League.

== Background ==
Sheffield United had finished third in the Northern League the previous season. Their ambition, however, was to play in the Football League and in April 1892 their application to join was successful at the second attempt. The club's application had previously been rejected in 1891 but with the league being expanded from 12 to 28 teams United, along with a number of other clubs including local rivals The Wednesday, were elected to play in the Football League for the 1892–93 season. To the annoyance of the club's directors however, whereas The Wednesday were given entry directly into the First Division, United were placed in the newly formed Second Division. Despite their Football League application being successful some members of United's football committee were unconvinced of its long-term future, and so the club elected to retain its membership of the Northern League as well.

== Kit ==
With the club now a member of The Football League, United elected to adopt a new jersey consisting of thick red and white stripes. This replaced the all white jersey they had worn in the previous season and was the first introduction of a strip that has remained (some minor alterations aside) to the present day. United retained their white jersey as a change strip and matched both shirts with blue knickers and socks. The club badge that had also adorned their jerseys the previous season was also dropped.

== Season ==
=== Pre-season ===
With United set to play in the newly formed Football League Second Division the club looked to strengthen its squad, as a number of fringe players departed Bramall Lane. Squad players William Getliff and W. Nesbitt were not retained, and long-serving defender Ned Stringer retired from playing to take up a scouting post with the club. Billy Bairstow was allowed to join local side Penistone, while Thomas Smith's brief stay with the club came to an end as he was signed by Yorkshire neighbours Barnsley.

Moving in the opposite direction, Walter Wigmore was signed from Worksop Town on 12 June. By July United had added defender William Mellor, and signed striker Arthur McCabe from nearby Rotherham Town on a free transfer. Sheffield born defender George Waller, who had played in the 1890 FA Cup Final for cross–city rivals The Wednesday, was signed from Middlesbrough at the start of August, before the club's pre-season dealings concluded with the arrival of wide player Joe Brady arrived from Renton. Despite this influx of new players, the established first team remained largely unchanged from the previous season, with those players signed during the summer being used mainly as reserves and making relatively few first team appearances.

With the new season about to start, United kicked off their fixture list with a show-piece friendly game against established Scottish side Celtic, beating their visitors 1–0 courtesy of a Harry Hammond goal.

== Squad ==
=== First team ===
Note: Flags indicate national team as defined under FIFA eligibility rules; some limited exceptions apply. Players may hold more than one non-FIFA nationality.

Pos.	Nation	Player
DF	ENG	Edgar Benson (Note: Edgar C. Benson was a local left back who played for Sheffield Club but was also registered with The Football League by United between August 1892 and June 1895. During that time he only made five appearances for the Blades and his only competitive start came in a Northern League game against Sunderland Albion in 1892.) (guest player from Sheffield FC)
MF	ENG	Joe Brady
FW	ENG	John Brookes (Note: John Arthur Brookes was an outside right registered by United in 1891 and stayed linked with the club until June 1895. During that period he made only three competitive appearances, his only league game being against South Bank in the Northern League.)
DF	SCO	Bob Cain
MF	ENG	Billy Croxon
FW	ENG	Fred Davies
MF	ENG	Samuel Dobson
FW	SCO	John Drummond
FW	SCO	James Duncan
FW	SCO	Hugh Gallacher
FW	ENG	Frank Gamble (guest player from Heeley)
DF	ENG	Harry Gregory (Note: Harry Gregory was a half back who played for United as a guest from Ecclesfield FC. Having made one appearance in United's first season, they registered him with The Football League for the 1892–1893 season but he made only one more appearance in a friendly fixture.) (guest player from Ecclesfield)
MF	ENG	George Groves
FW	ENG	Harry Hammond
FW	ENG	Harry Hassall (Note: Harry Hassall was a left sided forward who was signed by United in the summer of 1892 from Kiveton Park. He spent only one season with United and played only twice for the first team in friendly fixtures before being released for following summer. It was reported in the local press that he had died not long after, in 1894.)
DF	SCO	Billy Hendry (captain)

Pos.	Nation	Player
FW	SCO	Bob Hill
DF	ENG	Walter Hill
DF	ENG	Rab Howell
GK	ENG	Charlie Howlett
DF	ENG	Harry Lilley
GK	ENG	Will Lilley
MF	ENG	Arthur McCabe
DF	ENG	William Mellor
DF	ENG	Ernest Needham
FW	ENG	Walter Sylvester (Note: Walter Sylvester spent a period on trial towards the end of the season, playing once for the first team in a friendly fixture.) (guest player)
FW	ENG	Sandy Wallace
DF	ENG	George Waller
FW	ENG	Arthur Watson
DF	ENG	Michael Whitham
DF	ENG	Walter Wigmore
GK	ENG	Fred Wood (Note: Fred Wood was a Scots Guard who had previously played for Woolwich Arsenal when he was signed by United in November 1892. He made only five appearances for United, all of them in friendly matches.)

=== Players leaving before the end of the season ===
Note: Flags indicate national team as defined under FIFA eligibility rules; some limited exceptions apply. Players may hold more than one non-FIFA nationality.

Pos.	Nation	Player
GK	ENG	Charles Bunyan (guest from Chesterfield Town)
MF	SCO	W. Patterson

Pos.	Nation	Player
FW	SCO	John Scott

== Transfers ==
=== In ===
Position	Player	Transferred from	Fee	Date	Source
DF	(England) Walter Wigmore	Kiveton Park	Free	12 June 1892	
DF	(England) William Mellor	Unattached	Free	2 July 1892	
FW	(England) Arthur McCabe	Rotherham Town	Free	30 July 1892	
DF	(England) George Waller	Middlesbrough	Free	6 August 1892	
MF	(England) Joe Brady	Renton	Free	14 August 1892	
MF	(England) Billy Croxon	Illford	Free	5 November 1892	
FW	(Scotland) Hugh Gallacher	Preston North End	Free	28 January 1893	
FW	(Scotland) Bob Hill	Linfield	Free	11 February 1893	

=== Out ===
Position	Player	Transferred to	Fee	Date	Source
FW	(England) Billy Bairstow	Penistone	Free	June 1892	
FW	(England) William Getliff	N/A	Released	June 1892	
DF	(England) W. Nesbitt	N/A	Released	June 1892	
FW	(England) Thomas Smith	Barnsley	Free	June 1892	
DF	(England) Ned Stringer	Retired	N/A	June 1892	
DF	(Scotland) W. Patterson	N/A	Released	December 1892	
FW	(Scotland) John Scott	Gainsborough Trinity	Free	December 1892	

== League tables ==
=== Football League Second Division ===
Pos	Team	Pld	W	D	L	GF	GA	GAv	Pts	Qualification or relegation
1	Small Heath (C)	22	17	2	3	90	35	2.571	36	Qualification for test matches
2	Sheffield United (O, P)	22	16	3	3	62	19	3.263	35	Qualification for test matches
3	Darwen (O, P)	22	14	2	6	60	36	1.667	30	Qualification for test matches
4	Grimsby Town	22	11	1	10	42	41	1.024	23	
5	Ardwick	22	9	3	10	45	40	1.125	21	

Rules for classification: 1) Points; 2) Goal average; 3) Goals scored
(C) Champions; (O) Play-off winners; (P) Promoted

=== Northern League ===
Pos	Team	Pld	W	D	L	GF	GA	GD	Pts
1	Middlesbrough Ironopolis	10	9	1	0	22	6	+16	19
2	Newcastle United	10	5	1	4	30	19	+11	11
3	Sheffield United	10	4	2	4	18	16	+2	10
4	Middlesbrough	10	4	0	6	17	17	0	8
5	Stockton	10	3	1	6	24	27	−3	7
6	Darlington	10	2	1	7	11	37	−26	5

== Squad statistics ==
=== Appearances and goals ===
As of the end of the season

No.	Pos	Nat	Player	Total		Division Two		Test Match		FA Cup		Northern League	
No.	Pos	Nat	Player	Apps	Goals	Apps	Goals	Apps	Goals	Apps	Goals	Apps	Goals
	DF	(England) ENG	Edgar Benson	0	0	0	0	0	0	0	0	0	0
	MF	(England) ENG	Joe Brady	1	0	0	0	0	0	0	0	1	0
	FW	(England) ENG	John Brookes	0	0	0	0	0	0	0	0	0	0
	DF	(Scotland) SCO	Bob Cain	27	1	17	1	1	0	2	0	7	0
	MF	(England) ENG	Billy Croxon	3	0	2	0	0	0	0	0	1	0
	FW	(Scotland) SCO	Fred Davies	14	6	8	5	0	0	2	0	4	1
	MF	(England) ENG	Samuel Dobson	9	2	6	1	0	0	0	0	3	1
	FW	(Scotland) SCO	John Drummond	33	9	20	6	1	1	2	0	10	2
	FW	(Scotland) SCO	James Duncan	0	0	0	0	0	0	0	0	0	0
	FW	(Scotland) SCO	Hugh Gallacher	12	5	9	4	1	0	0	0	2	1
	FW	(England) ENG	Frank Gamble	1	0	0	0	0	0	0	0	1	0
	DF	(England) ENG	Harry Gregory	0	0	0	0	0	0	0	0	0	0
	MF	(England) ENG	George Groves	0	0	0	0	0	0	0	0	0	0
	FW	(England) ENG	Harry Hammond	29	22	18	18	1	0	2	1	8	3
	DF	(England) ENG	Harry Hassall	0	0	0	0	0	0	0	0	0	0
	DF	(Scotland) SCO	Billy Hendry	31	2	20	2	1	0	2	0	8	0
	FW	(Scotland) SCO	Bob Hill	9	6	7	4	1	0	0	0	1	2
	DF	(England) ENG	Walter Hill	2	0	2	0	0	0	0	0	0	0
	DF	(England) ENG	Rab Howell	32	2	22	2	1	0	2	0	7	0
	GK	(England) ENG	Charlie Howlett	24	0	15	0	1	0	2	0	6	0
	DF	(England) ENG	Harry Lilley	16	0	7	0	0	0	1	0	8	0
	GK	(England) ENG	Will Lilley	11	0	7	0	0	0	0	0	4	0
	MF	(England) ENG	Arthur McCabe	1	0	0	0	0	0	0	0	1	0
	DF	(England) ENG	William Mellor	5	0	2	0	0	0	1	0	2	0
	DF	(England) ENG	Ernest Needham	32	8	20	5	1	0	2	2	9	1
	DF	(England) ENG	Walter Sylvester	0	0	0	0	0	0	0	0	0	0
	FW	(England) ENG	Sandy Wallace	23	7	16	3	0	0	0	0	7	4
	DF	(England) ENG	George Waller	4	1	1	1	0	0	0	0	3	0
	FW	(England) ENG	Arthur Watson	24	8	15	6	1	0	2	1	6	1
	DF	(England) ENG	Michael Whitham	21	0	11	0	1	0	2	0	7	0
	DF	(England) ENG	Walter Wigmore	1	0	0	0	0	0	0	0	1	0
	GK	(England) ENG	Fred Wood	0	0	0	0	0	0	0	0	0	0
Players who left before the end of the season:
	GK	(England) ENG	Charles Bunyan	0	0	0	0	0	0	0	0	0	0
	FW	(Scotland) SCO	W. Patterson	1	0	1	0	0	0	0	0	0	0
	FW	(Scotland) SCO	John Scott	8	3	5	2	0	0	0	0	3	1

=== Top scorers ===
Place	Nation	Position	Name	League Division Two	Test Match	FA Cup	Northern League	Total
1	(England)	FW	Harry Hammond	18	0	1	3	22
2	(Scotland)	FW	John Drummond	6	1	0	2	9
3	(England)	DF	Ernest Needham	5	0	2	1	8
3	(England)	FW	Arthur Watson	6	0	1	1	8
4	(England)	FW	Sandy Wallace	3	0	0	4	7
5	(Scotland)	FW	Fred Davies	5	0	0	1	6
5	(Scotland)	FW	Bob Hill	4	0	0	2	6
6	(Scotland)	FW	Hugh Gallacher	4	0	0	1	5
7	(Scotland)	FW	John Scott	2	0	0	1	3
8	(England)	FW	Samuel Dobson	1	0	0	1	2
8	(Scotland)	DF	Billy Hendry	2	0	0	0	2
8	(England)	DF	Rab Howell	2	0	0	0	2
9	(Scotland)	DF	Bob Cain	1	0	0	0	1
9	(England)	DF	George Waller	1	0	0	0	1
Totals:				60	1	4	17	82

== Results ==
=== Key ===
Win Draw Loss Void

=== Division Two ===
3 September 1892	Sheffield United	4–2	Lincoln City	Bramall Lane
	Hammond ?', ?', ?'; Wallace ?'		Cameron ?'; Irving ?'	Attendance: 4,000

10 September 1892	Bootle	2–0	Sheffield United	Hawthorne Road
	Law ?'; Montgomery ?'			Attendance: 3,000

17 September 1892	Sheffield United	2–0	Small Heath	Bramall Lane
	Scott ?'; Hammond ?'			Attendance: 4,000

26 September 1892	Sheffield United	2–0	Grimsby Town	Bramall Lane
	Unknown ?'; Needham ?'			Attendance: 4,500

1 October 1892	Lincoln City	1–0	Sheffield United	Sincil Bank
	Cameron ?'			Attendance: 2,000

15 October 1892	Sheffield United	2–0	Darwen	Bramall Lane
	Scott ?'; Dobson ?'			Attendance: 500

19 November 1892 (Note: Michael Whitham played in goal for the second half.)	Darwen	3–1	Sheffield United	Barley Bank
	Aspden ?'; McKennie ?'; Entwistle ?'		Hendry ?'	Attendance: 3,000

26 November 1892	Sheffield United	8–3	Bootle	Bramall Lane
	Wallace ' Hammond ', ', ', ', ' Davies ', '			Attendance: 1,500

3 December 1892	Small Heath	1–1	Sheffield United	Coventry Road
	Wheldon '		Davies '	Attendance: 3,500

10 December 1892	Burslem Port Vale	0–10	Sheffield United	Westport Meadows
			Drummond ' Wallace ' Hammond ', ', ', ' Watson ', ' Davies ', '	Attendance: 1,500

17 December 1892	Sheffield United	4–0	Burslem Port Vale	Bramall Lane
	Needham ' Hammond ' Howell ' Drummond '			Attendance: 1,500

24 December 1892 (Note: With the score at 2–1, the match was abandoned on 68 minutes due to excessive fog.)	Sheffield United	2–1 (Abdn. 68)	Burton Swifts	Bramall Lane
	Unknown ', '			Attendance: 2,000

3 January 1893	Sheffield United	3–0	Walsall Town Swifts	Bramall Lane
	Hammond ', ' Hendry '			Attendance: 1,000

23 January 1893	Sheffield United	1–1	Northwich Victoria	Bramall Lane
	Needham '			Attendance: 1,250

6 February 1893	Sheffield United	3–1	Burton Swifts	Bramall Lane
	Drummond ' Gallacher ', '			Attendance: 3,000

18 February 1893	Northwich Victoria	1–3	Sheffield United	Drill Field
			Howell ' Hammond ' Drummond '	Attendance: 2,235

4 March 1893	Ardwick	2–3	Sheffield United	Hyde Road
			Gallacher ' Drummond ' Cain '	Attendance: 2,000

18 March 1893	Sheffield United	4–0	Crewe Alexandra	Bramall Lane
	Watson ', ' Hill ', '			Attendance: 2,750

25 March 1893	Sheffield United	2–1	Ardwick	Bramall Lane
	Needham ', '			Attendance: 4,250

31 March 1893	Grimsby Town	0–1	Sheffield United	Abbey Park
			Hill '	Attendance: 6,000

1 April 1893	Burton Swifts	0–3	Sheffield United	Peel Croft
			Hill ' Waller ' Gallacher '	Attendance: 'large'

12 April 1893 (Note: Harry Hammond was sent off.)	Crewe Alexandra	0–4	Sheffield United	Alexandra Recreation Ground
			Watson ', ' Hammond ' Gallacher '	Attendance: 2,000

15 April 1893	Walsall Town Swifts	1–1	Sheffield United	The Chuckery
			Drummond '	Attendance: 1,000

==== Test match ====
22 April 1893	Accrington	0–1	Sheffield United	Trent Bridge, Nottingham
			Drummond 55'	Attendance: 5,000

=== FA Cup ===
21 January 1893 Round one	Blackpool	1–3	Sheffield United	Raikes Hall
			Needham ', ' Hammond '	Attendance: 3,000

4 February 1893 Round two	Sheffield United	1–3	Sunderland	Bramall Lane
	Watson '			Attendance: 14,769

=== Northern League ===
24 September 1892	Sheffield United	5–1	Newcastle East End	Bramall Lane
	Drummond ' Scott ' Wallace ' Hammond ' Dobson '			Attendance: 4,000

8 October 1892	Sheffield United	0–0	Middlesbrough Ironopolis	Bramall Lane
				Attendance: 2,500

29 October 1892 (Note: Billy Hendry played in goal for the second half.)	Middlesbrough Ironopolis	1–0	Sheffield United	Paradise Ground
				Attendance: 4,000

24 December 1892	Sheffield United	5–0	Darlington	Bramall Lane
	Drummond ' Wallace ', ' Hammond ', '			Attendance: 2,000

31 December 1892	Middlesbrough	2–1	Sheffield United	Linthorpe Road
			Wallace '	Attendance: 3,000

2 January 1893	Stockton	5–0	Sheffield United	?
				Attendance: 2,500

14 January 1893	Newcastle United	1–1	Sheffield United	St James' Park
			Miller ' (o.g.)	Attendance: 2,500

30 January 1893	Sheffield United	1–3	Stockton	Bramall Lane
	Needham '			Attendance: 3,500

14 February 1893	Sheffield United	2–1	Middlesbrough	Bramall Lane
	Gallacher ' Watson '			Attendance: 5,000

3 April 1893	Darlington	2–3	Sheffield United	Feethams
			B. Hill ', ' Davies '	Attendance: 2,000

=== Wharncliffe Charity Cup ===
24 April 1893 Final	The Wednesday	0–0	Sheffield United	Olive Grove
				Attendance: 4,000

=== Challenge match ===
9 February 1893 (Note: Played in Hull under floodlights. Proceeds were given to Hull medical charities.)	Grimsby Town	0–2	Sheffield United	Town Cricket Club Ground, Hull
			Brady ', '	Attendance: 3,000

=== Friendlies ===
1 September 1892	Sheffield United	1–0	(Scotland) Celtic	Bramall Lane
	Hammond '			Attendance: 4,000

5 September 1892	Everton	3–2	Sheffield United	Priory Road
			Hammond ', '	Attendance: 6,000

12 September 1892	Sheffield United	1–0	Woolwich Arsenal	Bramall Lane
	Brady '			Attendance: 4,000

19 September 1892	Burnley	1–3	Sheffield United	Turf Moor
			Scott ', ' Hammond '	Attendance: 2,000

10 October 1892	Sheffield United	4–0	Gainsborough Trinity	Bramall Lane
	Scott ', ' Davies ' Cain '			Attendance: 2,000

17 October 1892	The Wednesday	1–1	Sheffield United	Olive Grove
			Drummond '	Attendance: 16,500

18 October 1892	Millwall Athletic	0–4	Sheffield United	The Athletic Grounds
			Davies ' Brady ' Scott ' Dobson '	Attendance: 2,000

20 October 1892 (Note: Bob Cain was sent off but was allowed to return to the field after apologising to the referee.)	Woolwich Arsenal	1–0	Sheffield United	Invicta Ground
				Attendance: 3,700

26 October 1892	Gainsborough Trinity	0–1	Sheffield United	The Northolme
			Dobson '	Attendance: 3,000

31 October 1892	Sheffield United	2–6	Rotherham Town	Bramall Lane
	Patterson ', '			Attendance: 2,000

3 November 1892	Nottingham Forest	0–1	Sheffield United	The Town Ground
			Hammond '	Attendance: 1,000

5 November 1892	Newcastle East End	2–2	Sheffield United	Stanley Street
			Howell ' Hammond '	Attendance: 4,500

10 November 1892	Casuals	1–2	Sheffield United	Leyton Cricket Ground
			Davies ' Scott '	Attendance: "low"

12 November 1892	Swindon Town	0–6	Sheffield United	The Croft
			Davies ' Watson ', ', ' Wallace ' Croxon '	Attendance: 3,500

21 November 1892	Sheffield United	1–3	The Wednesday	Bramall Lane
	Watson '			Attendance: 11,500

28 November 1892	Sheffield United	1–0	Bolton Wanderers	Bramall Lane
	Davies '			Attendance: 2,250

19 December 1892	Sheffield United	2–0	Oxford University	Bramall Lane
	Davies ' Hammond '			Attendance: 1,000

26 December 1892	Liverpool	1–0	Sheffield United	Anfield
				Attendance: 4,500

29 December 1892	Sheffield United	2–2	Casuals	Bramall Lane
	Watson ' Davies '			Attendance: 1,500

11 February 1893	Sheffield United	4–3	Nottingham Forest	Bramall Lane
	Drummond ', ' B. Hill ' Gallacher '			Attendance: 3,250

20 February 1893	Sheffield United	0–1	Burnley	Bramall Lane
				Attendance: 2,000

11 March 1893	Middlesbrough Ironopolis	1–2	Sheffield United	Paradise Ground
			Howell ' Unknown '	Attendance: 1,800

4 April 1893 (Note: Bob Hill missed a penalty.)	Sheffield United	2–2	Middlesbrough Ironopolis	Bramall Lane
	B. Hill ' Hendry '			Attendance: 4,500

8 April 1893	Stoke	1–3	Sheffield United	Victoria Ground
			Drummond ' Hammond ' B. Hill '	Attendance: 1,000

26 April 1893	Everton	3–1	Sheffield United	Goodison Park
			Hammond '	Attendance: 1,500

27 April 1893	Rotherham Town	1–2	Sheffield United	Clifton Grove
			B. Hill ' Gallacher '	Attendance: 3,000

29 April 1893	Burton Wanderers	3–0	Sheffield United	Derby Turn
				Attendance: "meagre"

== Bibliography ==
- Clarebrough and Kirkham (2008). Sheffield United Who's Who. Hallamshire Press. ISBN 978-1-874718-69-7.
- Clarebrough and Kirkham (1999). A Complete Record of Sheffield United Football Club 1889–1999. Hallamshire Press. ISBN 0-9508588-2-X.
