= Thomas Lee =

Thomas Lee may refer to:

== Arts and entertainment ==
- Thomas Lee (1794–1834), English architect
- Thomas Stirling Lee (1857–1916), English sculptor
- Thomas Oboe Lee (born 1945), Chinese-American composer
- Thomas Lee, alias used by Walter Hill when directing the 2000 film Supernova

== Business ==
- Thomas Peter Lee (1871–1939), American co-founder and president of the Farmers Petroleum Company
- Thomas H. Lee (businessman) (1944–2023), American pioneer in private equity and leveraged buyouts
- THL Partners, an American private equity firm
- Thomas Lee (analyst) American financial analyst and businessman

== Politics ==
=== United Kingdom ===
- Thomas Lee (fl.1385-1404), MP for Shropshire in 1385 and 1390
- Thomas Lee (died 1391), MP for Hertfordshire in 1386
- Thomas Lee (fl. 1420s), MP for Newcastle-under-Lyme in 1421 and 1427
- Thomas Lee (by 1492-?1539/44), MP for Winchester in 1539
- Thomas Lee (died 1545), MP for Hindon and Wilton
- Thomas Lee (died 1556), MP for Thirsk
- Thomas Lee (died 1572), MP for Banbury
- Sir Thomas Lee, 1st Baronet (1635–1691), MP for Aylesbury
- Sir Thomas Lee, 2nd Baronet (1661–1702), MP for Aylesbury
- Sir Thomas Lee, 3rd Baronet (1687–1749), MP for Buckinghamshire

=== United States ===
- Thomas Lee (Virginia colonist) (1690–1750), colonial Virginia politician
- Thomas Ludwell Lee (1730–1778), of the 1776 Virginia convention
- Thomas Sim Lee (1745–1819), American planter and statesman of Frederick County, Maryland
  - SS Thomas Sim Lee, a Liberty ship
- Thomas Lee (New Jersey politician) (1780–1856), US congressman from New Jersey
- Thomas Jesse Lee (1758–1805), American lawyer, planter, and politician

=== Other countries ===
- Thomas Lee (notary) (1783–1832), notary and politician in Lower Canada
- Lee Tung-hao (born 1955), Taiwanese economist and politician, also known as Thomas Lee
- Thomas Joseph Lee (1890–1969), Australian politician

== Other people ==
- Thomas Lee (army captain) (1552/3–1601), English army captain who served under Elizabeth I
- Thomas Lee (South Carolina judge) (1769–1839), United States federal judge
- Thomas Lee (footballer) (1876–?), English professional footballer
- Thomas Lee (clergyman), clergyman and English administrator at the University of Oxford
- Thomas H. Lee (power engineer) (1923–2001), Chinese-American power engineering professor at MIT
- Thomas H. Lee (electrical engineer), Korean-American electronic engineering professor at Stanford University
- Thomas Hong-Chi Lee (born 1945), Taiwanese-American historian
- Thomas E. Lee (1914–1982), archaeologist for the National Museum of Canada
- Thomas Rex Lee (born 1964), Utah Supreme Court justice
- T. Jack Lee (born 1935), director of the NASA Marshall Space Flight Center in Huntsville, Alabama
- T. Randall Lee, American chemist

== See also ==
- Lee (English surname)
- Thomas Leigh (disambiguation)
- Tommy Lee (disambiguation)
- Tom Lee (disambiguation)
