= Thomas Lea =

Thomas or Tom Lea may refer to:

- Sir Thomas Lea, 1st Baronet (1841–1902), English carpet manufacturer from Kidderminster and politician
- Thomas Calloway Lea Jr. (1877–1945), mayor of El Paso, Texas, 1915–17
- Thomas C. Lea III (1907–2001), son of Thomas C. Lea, Jr., muralist, artist, illustrator, author, LIFE war artist and correspondent
- Thomas Gibson Lea (1785–1844), American botanist
- Tom Lea (footballer), English footballer
- Thomas Lea (miller) (1757–1794), member of a prominent flour milling family in Wilmington, Delaware
- Massa Tom Lea, slave owner and ancestor of Alex Haley in Roots: The Saga of an American Family

== See also ==
- Tom Lee (disambiguation)
- Thomas Lee (disambiguation)
