= Joseph Brady =

Joseph Brady may refer to:

== Sports ==
- Joseph Brady (soccer), American football (soccer) player, got Olympic bronze medal in 1904
- Joe Brady (born 1989), American football coach
- Joe Brady (footballer), English footballer who played for Sheffield United between 1892 and 1893
- Joe Brady (hurler) (born 1982), Irish hurler
- Joe Brady (snooker player), Irish player of English billiards and snooker
- Joe Brady (rugby union) (born 1952), Irish rugby union player

== Other ==
- Joseph Brady (actor) (1928–2001), Scottish actor
- Joseph Brady (author), pen-name of Irish writer Maurice Browne (1892–1979)
- Joseph Brady (engineer) (1828–1908), Irish civil engineer active in Australia
- Joseph V. Brady (1922–2011), American behavioral neuroscientist
- Joseph Brady, American bridge player, won in 1996 Rockwell Mixed Pairs
- Joseph Brady (1906–?), who got injured in 1946 in Crest Theatre
- Joe Brady (Irish National Invincibles) (died 1883), member of the Irish National Invincibles

== See also ==
- Joseph Brody (disambiguation)
