= Croxon =

Croxon is a surname. Notable people with the surname include:

- Billy Croxon (1871–1949), English footballer
- Bruce Croxon (born 1960), Canadian entrepreneur

== See also ==
- Croxon, Jones & Co (Old Bank) Ltd, defunct English bank
