= 1908 American Tournament =

Professional English billiards and snooker competition

The 1908 American Tournament was the name for professional English Billiards and snooker tournaments held from October 1907 to March 1908 at Burroughes Hall. Seven professional players participated in round-robin tournaments for each sport. Tom Reece won the billiards title after defeating Charles Dawson 8,000–6,010 in a play-off final after each of them had won five group matches. Dawson won the snooker championship, with Cecil Harverson the runner-up.

== Participants ==
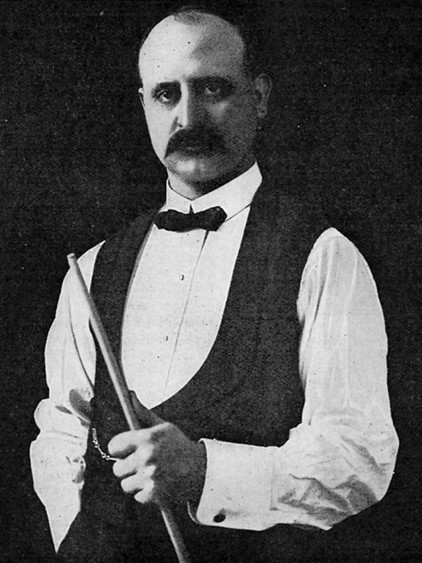
Cecil Harverson

For the billiards matches, a handicap was applied, with the winner of each heat being the first player to reach 8,000 points. The snooker matches were not handicapped and were determined on aggregate score. The matches were held at Burroughes Hall.

Player	Handicap (points received)
Charles Dawson (ENG)	0
Edward Diggle (ENG)	750
Cecil Harverson (ENG)	1,750
Tom Reece (ENG)	2,000
Tom Aiken (SCO)	2,250
Walter Lovejoy (ENG)	2,500
James Collens (ENG)	2,750

== Schedule ==
The schedule of matches and results was as follows. Winning scores are denoted in bold.

Start Date	Player	Billiards	Snooker	Player	Ref.
21 October 1907	Tom Reece (ENG)	**8,000**–7,544	**642**–570	Walter Lovejoy (ENG)	
28 October 1907	Edward Diggle (ENG)	**8,000**–7,804	**590**–550	Tom Aiken (SCO)	
4 November 1907	Walter Lovejoy (ENG)			James Collens (ENG)	
11 November 1907	Charles Dawson (ENG)			Cecil Harverson (ENG)	
18 November 1907	Tom Aiken (SCO)			Walter Lovejoy (ENG)	
25 November 1907	Edward Diggle (ENG)	**8,000**–7,970	**639**–556	Tom Reece (ENG)	
2 December 1907	Tom Aiken (SCO)	**8,000**–5,925	546–**657**	James Collens (ENG)	
9 December 1907	Cecil Harverson (ENG)	7,394–**8000**	616–**691**	Tom Reece (ENG)	
16 December 1907	Charles Dawson (ENG)	**8,000**–5,963	**609**–576	James Collens (ENG)	
30 December 1907	Tom Reece (ENG)			Tom Aiken (SCO)	
6 January 1908	Edward Diggle (ENG)			Cecil Harverson (ENG)	
13 January 1908	Charles Dawson (ENG)			Walter Lovejoy (ENG)	
20 January 1908	Tom Reece (ENG)			James Collens (ENG)	
27 January 1908	Cecil Harverson (ENG)			Walter Lovejoy (ENG)	
3 February 1908	Charles Dawson (ENG)			Tom Aiken (SCO)	
10 February 1908	Edward Diggle (ENG)			Walter Lovejoy (ENG)	
17 February 1908	Cecil Harverson (ENG)			James Collens (ENG)	
24 February 1908	Charles Dawson (ENG)			Tom Reece (ENG)	
2 March 1908	Edward Diggle (ENG)			James Collens (ENG)	
9 March 1908	Cecil Harverson (ENG)	**8,000**–6,214	**619**–574	Tom Aiken (SCO)	
16 March 1908	Charles Dawson (ENG)	walkover-withdrawn	walkover-withdrawn	Edward Diggle (ENG)	

== Final standings ==
The final standings for each competition are shown below.

=== Billiards ===
Dawson and Reece, who both won five matches, held a play-off match to determine the overall winner. Reece won the prize for the highest proportionate aggregate. The final started on 23 March 1908, with Reece (receiving 2,000 start) finishing the first day 3,000–1,228 ahead. At the conclusion of the final on 29 March, Reece won the title by defeating Dawson 8,000–6,010.

Position	Player	Handicap	Matches won
1	Charles Dawson (ENG)	0	5
2	Tom Reece (ENG)	2,000	5
3	Cecil Harverson (ENG)	1,750	4
4	Edward Diggle (ENG)	750	3
5	Tom Aiken (SCO)	2,250	2
6	James Collens (ENG)	2,750	2
7	Walter Lovejoy (ENG)	2,500	0

=== Snooker ===
There was a prize of 25gns for the winner of the snooker competition.

Position	Player	Points scored
1	Charles Dawson (ENG)	4,063
2	Cecil Harverson (ENG)	3,824
3	James Collens (ENG)	3,633
4	Tom Reece (ENG)	3,511
5	Walter Lovejoy (ENG)	3,416
6	Tom Aiken (SCO)	3,297
7	Edward Diggle (ENG)	2,556
