= Li Hongqi =

Li Hongqi may refer to:

- Lee Hong-chi (born 1990), Taiwanese actor
- Thomas Hong-Chi Lee (born 1945), Taiwanese-American historian
