= Melbourne Inman =

English snooker and billiards player

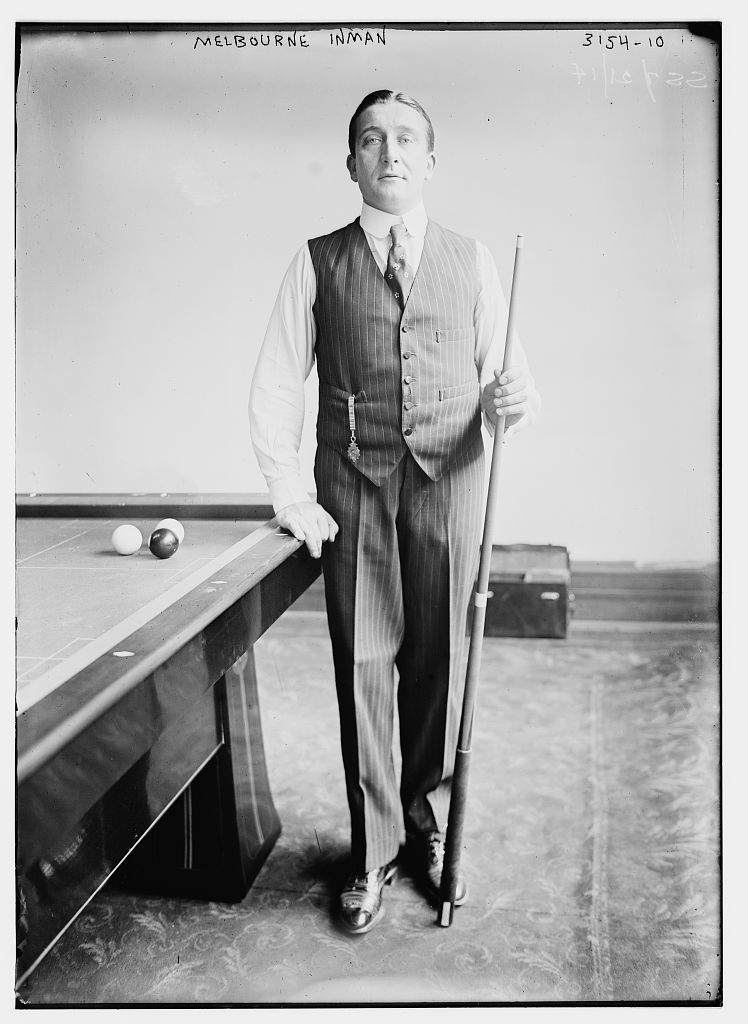
- Born: 15 July 1878; Twickenham, Middlesex, England
- Died: 11 August 1951 (aged 73); Farnborough, England
- Professional: 1898–1951
- World Billiards Champion: 1908, 1909, 1912, 1913, 1914, 1919

Melbourne Inman (15 July 1878 – 11 August 1951) was an English professional billiards player. In a career spanning over 50 years, he reached the pinnacle of the sport in the early 1900s, being declared the World Billiards Champion in 1908 and successfully defending his title in 1909, later reclaiming it in 1912, 1913, 1914 and 1919.

In addition to his six world championships, he won the Billiards Association Professional Tournament (also known as "The American Tournament") in 1906, finishing tied with Edward Diggle for first place; he won the last title of his career in the 1935/36 Daily Mail Gold Cup, at the age of 57.

== Life ==
Born at Twickenham on 15 July 1878, Inman worked in his teenage years as a billiard marker; he first played the game at the age of 14. He came to prominence as the champion of the Billiards Association's Markers' Tournament during the 1897-98 season, beating Alec Brown (father of snooker player Alec Brown) 500–442 in the final, in which he made a break of 91. He had also reached the final of the earlier staging of the event during this season, in which he compiled breaks of 92, 53 and 52 but lost by 28 points to J. Dunn.

He was the Billiards World Champion in 1908–1909, 1912–1914 and 1919. In 1914 he defeated Willie Hoppe. Inman also participated in the 1927 World Snooker Championship reaching the second round. He died at the age of 73 years on 11 August 1951 in Farnborough.
