= Billy Hendry =

Scottish footballer

Personal information
- Full name: William Harold Hendry
- Date of birth: 20 June 1869
- Place of birth: Newport-on-Tay, Scotland
- Date of death: 4 May 1901 (aged 31)
- Place of death: Kidderminster, England
- Position: Defender

Youth career
- 1886: Dunblane Thistle
- 1887: Dundee Wanderers

Senior career*
Years	Team	Apps	(Gls)
1888	West Bromwich Albion	16	(3)
1889	Kidderminster Harriers		
1889	Stoke	16	(1)
1890–1891	Preston North End	15	(0)
1891–1895	Sheffield United	91	(3)
1895–1896	Dundee	16	(0)
1896	Bury	8	(1)
1898–1899	Brighton United		
1899–1901	Shrewsbury Town		
Total		162	(8)
Medal record
Sheffield United
Runner-up	Second Division	1893
- * Club domestic league appearances and goals

William Harold Hendry (20 June 1869 – 4 May 1901) was a Scottish footballer who played as a defender. Born in Newport-on-Tay he played in the Football League for Bury, Preston North End, Sheffield United, Stoke and West Bromwich Albion.

== Football career ==
=== Early career ===
After leaving school, Hendry, a talented forward, played for Dunblane Thistle and then Dundee Wanderers, usually at outside right, but he was soon to play football in England. There was no professional football at the time in Scotland, so those players with talents to sell crossed the border.

In 1888, Hendry found himself playing for West Bromwich Albion in the first Football League season. Hendry made his League debut on 8 September 1888, in a 2–0 win against Stoke at the Victoria Ground. Hendry scored his debut League goal on 29 September 1888 at Stoney Lane, against Burnley. He played 16 of the "Throstles" 22 Football League matches and scored three goals in 1888–89. Hendry, now playing as a centre forward was restless in his time with the Baggies, and in April 1889 he joined Stoke. While at Stoke Hendry was mainly used as a left-back and played 16 times scoring once. In January 1890 he joined Preston North End, who had just become Football League champions for a second time.

=== Sheffield United ===
In January 1891, Charles Stokes, the Chairman of Sheffield United's football committee went to Preston and returned with the signatures of three Preston players in the hope of improving United's professionalism. The players he signed were Jack Drummond, Sammy Dobson and Billy Hendry. Hendry made his debut for Sheffield United against Derby Junction on 28 February 1891 in a Midland Football League match. It was Drummond who was to score the goal that took the Baldes into the First Division in 1893, but it was Hendry's signing that was the most significant. By now, Hendry had become a centre half. He was made team captain at Sheffield United and remained so until his career with the club ended in 1895.

He was a small stocky player, described as neat, cool and calculating with 'exceptional skill'. His value to Sheffield United lay not just in the shrewdness and effectiveness of his play, but in the direction and leadership he gave to the club in the early years of Sheffield United in general. The United committee "set great value upon his options as to the arrangement and formation of the team, and placed confidence in his judgement... and ability as a player, a captain, and an adviser" It was also said that Hendry's advice and guidance helped the natural talents of Ernest Needham, who was to become an England international. Hendry sustained an injury during a New Year's Day friendly fixture at Leith Athletic in 1895 and it was thought that it would end his career. He played only four more games for United before being released the following summer.

=== Post Sheffield United ===
Despite his injury problems Hendry later went on to play for Dundee then returned South of the border to play for Bury in The Football League before moving to Brighton United and finally to Shrewsbury Town where he remained until his death in 1901 from heart disease.

== Professional Baseball ==
In 1890 Hendry played second base professionally for Preston North End Baseball Club in the National League of Baseball of Great Britain.

== Style of play ==
Hendry had an ability to skilfully dribble the ball, a technique not used in the traditional English game in the 1880s. (One source described Hendry had qualities of speed, headwork and whole-hearted endeavour.)

== Career statistics ==
Appearances and goals by club, season and competition
Club	Season	League			National cup		Other		Total	
Club	Season	Division	Apps	Goals	Apps	Goals	Apps	Goals	Apps	Goals
West Bromwich Albion	1888–89	Football League	16	3	0	0	0	0	16	3
Stoke	1888–89	Football League	2	0	0	0	0	0	2	0
Stoke	1889–90	Football League	14	1	0	0	0	0	14	1
Stoke	Total		16	1	0	0	0	0	16	1
Preston North End	1889–90	Football League	1	0	0	0	0	0	1	0
Preston North End	1890–91	Football League	14	0	1	0	0	0	15	0
Preston North End	Total		15	0	1	0	0	0	16	0
Sheffield United	1890–91	Midland League	7	0	0	0	1 (Note: Appearance(s) in Wharncliffe Charity Cup)	0	8	0
Sheffield United	1891–92	Northern League	15	0	5	0	3 (Note: Two appearances in Sheffield Challenge Cup; one appearance in Wharncliffe Charity Cup)	0	23	0
Sheffield United	1892–93	Second Division	20	2	2	0	9 (Note: One appearance in Football League test matches; eight appearances in Northern League)	0	31	2
Sheffield United	1893–94	First Division	29	0	1	0	5 (Note: Four appearances in United Counties League; one appearance in Wharncliffe Charity Cup)	0	35	0
Sheffield United	1894–95	First Division	20	1	0	0	2 (Note: Appearance(s) in United Counties League)	1	22	2
Sheffield United	Total		91	3	8	0	20	1	119	4
Dundee	1895–96	Scottish Division One	16	0	2	0	0	0	18	0
Bury	1896–97	First Division	8	1	2	0	0	0	10	1
Career total			162	8	13	0	20	1	195	9

== Honours ==
Sheffield United

- Second Division: Runners Up – 1893

== Bibliography ==
- Clarebrough, Denis. From The past. Sheffield United matchday programme, 10 January 1986.
