= Frank Gamble =

Frank Gamble may refer to:

- Frank Gamble (footballer, born 1871) (1871–?), English footballer for Sheffield United
- Frank Gamble (footballer, born 1961), English footballer for Derby County and Rochdale

== See also ==
- Frank Gambale, Australian jazz fusion guitarist
