= Tom Lee =

Tom Lee may refer to:

== Sports ==
- Tom Lee (baseball) (1862–1886), baseball player in 1884
- Tom Lee (footballer, born 1874) (1874–?), Australian rules footballer for Collingwood
- Tom Lee (footballer, born 1991), Australian rules footballer for St Kilda

== Other people ==
- Tom Lee (gang leader) (c. 1837–1918), American gang leader
- Tom Lee (New Mexico politician) (1920–1986), first Navajo member of the New Mexico Senate
- Tom J. Lee (1923–1996), member of the Texas House of Representatives
- Tom Stewart Lee (born 1941), U.S. federal judge
- Tom Lee (Florida politician) (born 1962), Republican politician, former president of the Florida Senate
- Tom Lee, the main character of the play Tea and Sympathy and the film adaptation

== Places ==
- Tom Lee Music, a music superstore in Hong Kong and Canada
- Tom Lee Park, in Memphis, Tennessee

== See also ==
- Thomas Lee (disambiguation)
- Tommy Lee (disambiguation)
- Tom Lea (disambiguation)
- Tom Leigh (disambiguation)
