= Hugh Gallacher (footballer, born 1870) =

Scottish footballer

Personal information
- Full name: Hugh Morgan Gallacher
- Date of birth: 11 May 1870
- Place of birth: Galston, Scotland
- Date of death: 20 May 1941 (aged 71)
- Place of death: Girvan, Scotland
- Position: Winger

Senior career*
Years	Team	Apps	(Gls)
- Maybole
1889–1890	Celtic	1	(0)
1890–1892	Preston North End	55	(12)
1892–1894	Sheffield United	40	(8)
1894–1896	Leicester Fosse	47	(11)
1896	Nelson		
1897–1899	New Brompton		
Medal record
Sheffield United
Runner-up	Second Division	1893
- * Club domestic league appearances and goals

Hugh Morgan 'Paddy' Gallacher (11 May 1870 – 20 May 1941) was a Scottish footballer who played in the Football League for Leicester Fosse, Preston North End and Sheffield United. Born in Galston in East Ayrshire he started his career with local side Maybole and had a spell at Celtic before moving to play in England. After leaving Leicester Fosse he spent time with Nelson and New Brompton before retiring.

== Career ==
Having started his career with Maybole Gallagher moved to Celtic in the summer of 1889, where he played in their second ever league game against Cambuslang. Having failed to find a regular place in Celtic's team he moved to Preston North End in September 1890 where he found appearances easier to come by and his six goals that season left him as North End's top scorer.

After a couple of seasons with Preston, Gallacher signed for Sheffield United in January 1893. United were halfway through their first season in the Football League and Gallacher scored twice on his debut against Burton Swifts, and became part of the side that finished second in the Division. He played in the side that beat Accrington in the test-match that sealed promotion to the First Division and missed only one game of United's first season in the top flight.

In August 1894 Gallacher moved to Leicester Fosse where he spend two years, playing 47 games in the Football League, before spells at Nelson and New Brompton.

== Playing style ==
Described by United trainer George Waller as 'a fine outside left', Gallacher was known for chewing an ounce of twist tobacco during every game.

== Honours ==
Sheffield United

- Second Division
  - Runners–up: 1892–93
