= Arthur F. Wright =

American sinologist (1913–1976)

- Born: December 3, 1913; Portland, Oregon, U.S.
- Died: August 11, 1976 (aged 62); New London, Connecticut, U.S.
- Education: Stanford University (BA); University of Oxford (MA); Harvard University (MA, PhD)
- Scientific career
- Fields: Sinology
- Institutions: Yale University
- Doctoral students: Jonathan Spence, Thomas Hong-Chi Lee

Arthur Frederick Wright (December 3, 1913 – August 11, 1976) was an American sinologist and historian. He was a professor of Chinese history at Yale University. He specialized in Chinese social and intellectual history of the pre-modern period.

== Early life and education ==
Wright earned his undergraduate degrees at Stanford University and the University of Oxford. He then earned his master's degree in Chinese in 1940 and his Ph.D. in Chinese in 1947 from Harvard University.

== Career ==
Wright and his wife, Mary C. Wright, joined the faculty of Stanford University in 1947; and both were made full professors in 1958. In 1959, Wright and his wife joined the faculty at Yale. In 1961, Wright became the Charles Seymour Professor of History at Yale.

Wright believed that the scholar "should occasionally stand back and contemplate the whole continuum of time and of problems which give meaning to his specialized studies."

== Selected works ==
In a statistical overview derived from writings by and about Arthur Wright, OCLC/WorldCat encompasses roughly 70+ works in 200+ publications in 6 languages and 8,800+ library holdings.

- Studies in Chinese Thought (1953)
- Buddhism in Chinese History (1957)
- Arthur F. Wright, Denis Twitchett, ed. (1962). Confucian Personalities. Stanford University Press. ISBN 1-896951-88-0.
- Confucianism and Chinese civilization (1964)
- Perspectives on the Tʻang (1973)
- The Sui Dynasty (1978)
- The Confucian Persuasion (1980)
- Studies in Chinese Buddhism (1990)
