= Walter Hill (footballer) =

English footballer

Personal information
- Full name: Walter Hill
- Place of birth: England
- Position: Defender

Senior career*
Years	Team	Apps	(Gls)
- Grimesthorpe
1891–1899	Sheffield United	16	(0)
Medal record
Sheffield United
Runner-up	Second Division	1893
- * Club domestic league appearances and goals

Walter Hill (date of birth unknown) was an English footballer who played as a defender for Sheffield United in The Football League.

Hill was signed from Grimeshorpe's local team in the summer of 1891 but despite spending almost eight years registered with Sheffield United he spent the majority of that time in the reserves and never played more than five consecutive games for the first team. He did play fifteen times in The Football League, playing his last competitive match in February 1896, but featured in only a handful of friendly fixtures after that. Despite this United retained his league registration until the summer of 1899 after which his contract with the club was terminated.

== Honours ==
Sheffield United

- Football League Division Two
  - Runner-up: 1892–93
