= Harry Cookson =

English footballer

Harry "Gyp" Cookson
Personal information
- Full name: James Henry Cookson
- Date of birth: 28 January 1869
- Place of birth: Blackpool, England
- Date of death: 27 May 1922 (aged 53)
- Place of death: Blackpool, England
- Position: Forward

Youth career
- South Shore

Senior career*
Years	Team	Apps	(Gls)
1887–1888	Burslem Port Vale	0	(0)
1888–1890	South Shore		
1890–1892	Blackpool		
1892–1893	Accrington	27	(14)
1893–1896	Blackpool		
- * Club domestic league appearances and goals

James Henry Cookson (28 January 1869 – 27 May 1922), better known as Harry "Gyp" Cookson, was an English professional footballer. A forward, he played for South Shore, Burslem Port Vale, Blackpool, and Accrington.

== Career ==
Cookson began his career with South Shore (a club that merged with Blackpool in 1900), making his debut on 11 September 1886 before joining Burslem Port Vale in late August 1887, along with his teammate Richard Elston. Cookson scored 23 goals in 33 friendlies to become the club's top scorer in the 1887–88 season. Both Cookson and Elston returned to South Shore in the summer of 1888 and were members of the team that beat Fleetwood Rangers 6–1 to win the Fylde Cup in 1888.

He fell out with South Shore at the end of the 1889–90 season and signed with non-League Blackpool on 2 April. He made his debut for the "Seasiders" at the start of the following 1890–91 campaign, in a 5–1 defeat at Heywood Central on 6 September. By December, he had been re-signed for another season for 15 shillings a week.

In May 1892, he joined Accrington (in part-exchange for full-back Jerry Morgan) for £40. His first official game was against the club he had just left on 1 September; Blackpool won 4–2. He made a further 26 league appearances, scoring 14 goals. He played in the test match defeat to Sheffield United at Trent Bridge that saw Accrington relegated out of the First Division. This was his final appearance for the club.

In May 1893, he returned to Blackpool. His first comeback game for the club was against Accrington, a 3–1 victory on 2 September. He scored over twenty goals during the 1893–94 season. He played his final game for Blackpool on 25 April 1896, in a 3–1 defeat to Darwen.

== Career statistics ==
Appearances and goals by club, season and competition
Club	Season	League			FA Cup		Other		Total	
Club	Season	Division	Apps	Goals	Apps	Goals	Apps	Goals	Apps	Goals
Accrington	1892–93	First Division	27	14	2	1	1	0	30	15

== Personal and later life ==
Outside of football, Cookson was a builder and contractor. His father, Thomas, built the Clifton Arms Hotel, among other things.

Cookson married Polly Castle at South Shore's Holy Trinity Church on 28 January 1895, and they honeymooned later the same day in London.

Cookson died in 1922, aged 53. He was survived by his wife, two sons and two daughters. He was buried at Layton cemetery. After his death, his widow became vice-chairman of South Shore, and one of his sons played for the club.
