= Rotherham Swifts F.C. =

19th-century football club in Yorkshire, England

Rotherham Swifts
- Full name: Rotherham Swifts Football Club
- Nickname: The Swifts
- Founded: 1888
- Dissolved: 1891
- Ground: The Holmes
- Capacity: 4,000
- Secretary: Fred Mickelthwait
Home colours

Rotherham Swifts F.C. was an association football club from Kimberworth, near Rotherham, Yorkshire, England, active in the 19th century.

== History ==
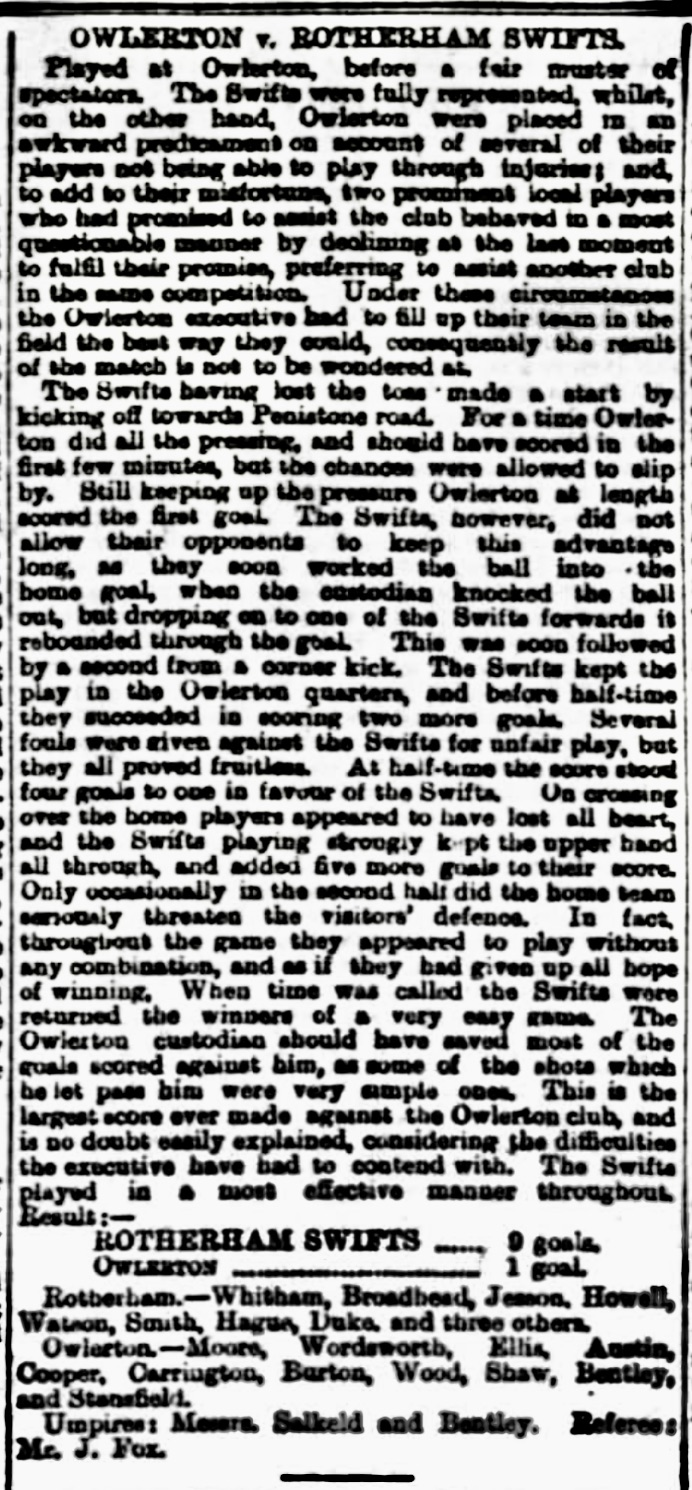
1889–90 FA Cup 1st Qualifying Round, Owlerton 1–9 Rotherham Swifts, Sheffield Daily Telegraph, 7 October 1889

The first reference to the club is from July 1888, when a representative attended a meeting of 22 clubs to arrange fixtures before the 1888–89 season. The club had enough members to field two XIs on its first match weekend in September 1888 (helped by recruiting several players from Ecclesfield), the first XI losing at Eckington Works, and the second XI beating Junior Cup champions Carbrook Church at home.

It also entered the FA Cup that season, although the competition now had qualifying rounds, and the Swifts were eliminated in the first qualifying round at Park Grange. The club finished its first season with a £3 profit on income of £110.

The Swifts' best run in the national cup came in 1889–90; after hammering an under-strength Owlerton 9–1 - away from home - in the first qualifying round and going nap at Whitby in the second, it was drawn to host the senior club in Rotherham, Rotherham Town, in the third. The tie ended goalless, an attempt to play 30 minutes of extra-time being curtailed when darkness fell after 10; the replay also went to extra-time, Town this time apparently winning 2–1.

However the match had ended 6 minutes early, and a successful Swifts protest saw the final 6 minutes being played off on 2 December, as a curtain-raiser to the Sheffield Football Association match against the Cheshire Football Association, which fortuitously had already been arranged to take place at Town's Clifton Lane ground; owing to injuries both sides only fielded 10 men, and Town scored a third goal in the extra time. Several of the players - the Swifts' Pearce, Whittam, Howell, and Watson, and Town's Rodgers, Cross, Longden, and Bridgewater - played in the main event for the Sheffield FA.

The Rotherham sides also met in the third round of the Sheffield and Hallamshire Senior Cup the same season, Town this time winning at the first time of asking, 3–2 at the Swifts' Holmes ground.

The club was a founder member of the Midland Alliance, a competition at a level below the Midland League (in which Rotherham Town played), in 1890. However, after three games, the Swifts withdrew, finding the costs of travel to be too great, and, before its resignation was accepted, applied to join the Sheffield & District League. Its Alliance record of one win, one draw, and one defeat was expunged.

The obvious problem for the club was that Town had already secured the support of Rotherham, and, when the clubs played home matches on the same day, the crowds headed for Town rather than Swifts. The club duly dissolved before the 1891–92 season. There was a sad aftermath in May 1892, when former goalkeeper Thomas Pearce drowned himself in the canal near the Swifts' ground; a verdict of suicide by temporary insanity (blamed on being "troubled about his love affairs") was returned.

== Colours ==
The club wore blue and amber stripes.

== Ground ==
The club's first home match was played at the Richmond Park Ground in Kimberworth. From November 1888 it played at the Holmes, which hosted the replay of the Sheffield Cup in 1890, won by Rotherham Town. The Swifts used the Pigeon Cote Inn on Steel Street for facilities.

The highest recorded attendance at the ground was 4,000, for the FA Cup qualifying tie with Rotherham Town on 16 November 1889.

== Notable players ==
- Walter Broadhead, who played in the club's first match, and who later joined Rotherham Town, playing for Town in the Football League.
- Rab Howell, Arthur Watson, and Michael Whitham - all recruited from Ecclesfield as the first Swifts players.
