= William Mellor (footballer) =

English footballer

Billy Mellor
Personal information
- Full name: William Mellor
- Position: Defender

Youth career
- Heywood Central
- Sheffield Exchange
- Melville

Senior career*
Years	Team	Apps	(Gls)
1892–1893	Sheffield United	4	(0)
1893–1895	The Wednesday	1	(0)
1895–1896	Loughborough Town	3	(0)
1896–1897	Oldham County		
1897–1898	Swindon Town		
1898–1899	Wigan County		
1899–1900	Darwen		
Medal record
Sheffield United
Runner-up	Second Division	1893
- * Club domestic league appearances and goals

William "Billy" Mellor (date and place of birth unknown) was a footballer who played as a defender.

Having played as a young amateur for teams in Sheffield, Mellor was spotted by Sheffield United and offered a professional contract in the summer of 1892. United had been accepted into Football League Division Two for the following season and Mellor struggled to meet the standard required, making only four league appearances for the club.

Mellow was transferred to local rivals The Wednesday in December 1893 where he spent a further eighteen months, but only managed one more league appearance. From there he moved to Loughborough Town in May 1895, whom he also represented in The Football League.

Mellor then dropped out of league football and had spells with Oldham County, Swindon Town and Wigan County before finishing his career with Darwen.

== Honours ==
Sheffield United

- Football League Division Two
  - Runner-up: 1892–93
