= Thomas Legh =

Thomas Legh may refer to:

- Sir Thomas Legh (lawyer) (c. 1510–1545), English ambassador to Denmark and jurist involved in Henry VIII's dissolution of the monasteries
- Thomas Legh (1593–1644), of Adlington, High Sheriff of Cheshire 1629 and 1643
- Thomas Legh (1614–1687), of Adlington, High Sheriff of Cheshire 1662
- Thomas Legh (1644–1691), of Adlington, High Sheriff of Cheshire 1688
- Thomas Legh (1636–1697), MP for Liverpool, 1685–1689
- Thomas Legh (1675–1717), MP for Newton, 1701–1713
- Thomas Peter Legh (1754–1797), MP for Newton, 1780–1797
- Thomas Legh (died 1857) (1793–1857), MP for Newton, 1814–1832
- Thomas Legh, 2nd Baron Newton (1857–1942), MP for Newton 1886–1898, Paymaster-General 1915–1916

== See also ==
- Thomas Legh Claughton (1808–1892), British academic, poet and clergyman
- Thomas Leigh (disambiguation)
