= Joseph Brody (disambiguation) =

Joseph or Joe Brody may refer to:

- Joseph Brody (1877–1937), American composer who taught George Gershwin composition
- Joe Brody, fictional character in the novel The Big Sleep and in its film adaptations
- Joe Brody, fictional character in Godzilla (2014 film)
- Joe Brody, character in Lunarcop played by Michael Paré

== See also ==
- Joe Brodie, drummer in Drowners
- Brody (disambiguation)
- Joseph Brady (disambiguation)
