= Sandy Wallace =

English footballer

Personal information
- Full name: Alexander Wallace
- Position: Forward

Senior career*
Years	Team	Apps	(Gls)
- Abercorn
1891–1893	Sheffield United	29	(9)
1893–1894	Middlesbrough Ironopolis		
Medal record
Sheffield United
Runner-up	Second Division	1893
- * Club domestic league appearances and goals

Alexander "Sandy" Wallace (date of birth unknown) was a footballer who played in various forward positions for Sheffield United and Middlesbrough Ironopolis in The Football League in the 1890s.

== Career ==
Wallace's first recorded club was Scottish side Abercorn and it was from here that he was signed by Sheffield United in December 1891. He scored on his United league debut in a 2–1 victory over Newcastle East End on Boxing Day, and repeated the feat on his FA Cup debut a few weeks later, this time netting twice in a 3–0 win over Blackpool.

Described as a 'quick and clever player' with 'an accurate shot' the local media also saw Wallace as 'a bit on the light side'. He played predominantly as an outside right during his first season at Bramall Lane but switched to that of inside right during his second year, whilst filling in at every other forward position at some point when required.

Wallace played regularly during his first season for United and retained his starting position when they were elected to The Football League for his second. His final game for United came in the end of season test match against Accrington, a game which United won 1–0 meaning they achieved promotion to the First Division.

Wallace was transferred in the summer of 1893 and joined Middlesbrough Ironopolis who had been elected to The Football League, but the club was beset by financial problems and folded a year later.

== Honours ==
Sheffield United

- Football League Division Two
  - Runner-up: 1892–93
