= Tommy Lee (disambiguation) =

Tommy Lee is an American heavy metal drummer for the band Mötley Crüe and the ex-husband of Pamela Anderson.

Tommy Lee may also refer to:

- Tommy Lee (footballer) (born 1986), English footballer
- Tommy Lee (rugby league) (born 1988), English rugby league footballer
- Tommy Lee (gridiron football) (born 1941), American former football player and coach
- "Tommy Lee" (song), a song by American rapper Tyla Yaweh featuring Post Malone
- Tommy Lee Sparta (born 1987), Jamaican dancehall musician
- Tommylee Lewis (born 1992), American football player

== See also ==
- Thomas Lee (disambiguation)
- Tom Lee (disambiguation)
