= Michael Whitham =

English footballer (1867–1924)

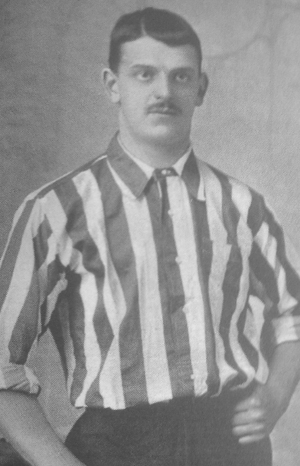
- Michael Whitham in his United kit

Personal information
- Full name: Michael Whitham
- Date of birth: 6 November 1867
- Place of birth: Ecclesfield, England
- Date of death: 6 May 1924 (aged 56)
- Place of death: London, England
- Position: Right back

Senior career*
Years	Team	Apps	(Gls)
1887–1890	Ecclesfield		
1887–1888	The Wednesday		
1889–1890	Rotherham Swifts		
1890–1897	Sheffield United	123	(1)

International career
1892	England	1	(0)

Managerial career
- 1911–1912: Gainsborough Trinity
Medal record
Sheffield United
Runner-up	Second Division	1893
- * Club domestic league appearances and goals

Michael Whitham (6 November 1867 – 6 May 1924) was an English international footballer, who played as a right back. Born in Ecclesfield, Sheffield he played for both The Wednesday and Sheffield United where he spent seven years. Whitham gained one cap for England and went on to become a trainer at a number of clubs following his retirement from playing as well as a brief spell as manager of Gainsborough Trinity.

== Playing career ==
Whitham started his career in and around the Sheffield area where he played semi-professionally for a number of clubs (often registered with more than one club during the same period as was allowed at the time.) After making one appearance for The Wednesday he turned fully professional and signed for Rotherham Swifts in 1889. The club were soon in financial trouble however and Whitham and two other players, Rab Howell and Arthur Watson were sold to newly formed Sheffield United in March 1890.

After his move to Bramall Lane Whitham was virtually ever present for the next six years, being a stalwart of the side as they were promoted into the First Division in 1892.

== International career ==
Whitham earned one cap for England in 1892, playing in a Home Championship game against Ireland in Belfast.

== Post-playing career ==
After seven years and with his fitness failing Whitham left United and spent time as a trainer Rotherham Town and Gainsborough Trinity where he also spent one season as manager. Two years as trainer at Huddersfield Town followed before he moved to Brentford in the same position in 1914 where he stayed until his death in 1924.

== Personal life ==
Whilst with Brentford Whitham married his duties as a trainer with a job working for Wilkinson Sword as a grinder. He became massively overweight in later years and died in 1924 from resultant health problems.

== Honours ==
Sheffield United

- Football League Division Two
  - Runner-up: 1892–93
