= Harry Lea =

English footballer

Personal information
- Full name: Harry Lea
- Place of birth: England
- Position: Inside forward

Senior career*
Years	Team	Apps	(Gls)
1892–1893	Accrington	28	(10)
1893	West Manchester		
- * Club domestic league appearances and goals

Harry Lea was an English footballer who played in the Football League for Accrington.
