= Bob Hill (footballer) =

Scottish footballer

Personal information
- Date of birth: 3 July 1867
- Place of birth: Forfar, Scotland
- Date of death: 3 October 1938 (aged 71)
- Place of death: Redcar, England
- Position: Forward

Youth career
- Black Watch

Senior career*
Years	Team	Apps	(Gls)
- Glentoran
1890–1893	Linfield		
1893–1895	Sheffield United	64	(20)
1895–1897	Ardwick	22	(9)
1898	Watford St. Marys		
1898–1899	Millwall		
1899–1900	Brighton United		
1900–1901	Dundee		
1901–?	Forfar Athletic		
Medal record
Sheffield United
Runner-up	Second Division	1893
- * Club domestic league appearances and goals

Robert Hill (3 July 1867 – 3 October 1938) was a Scottish footballer who played primarily as a centre or inside forward.

Born in Forfar, Scotland, Hill began his football career when he was a soldier and was spotted playing for his regimental team, Black Watch. After a brief spell at Glentoran, it was Irish League rivals Linfield who bought him out of his army contract and took him on as a player. Hill spent three successful seasons with the Belfast club, winning two Irish Cup and two League Champions medals with them.

In February 1893, Hill arrived at Sheffield United, scoring on his debut as a trialist and prompting United to sign him permanently. He soon established himself in United's first team and played in the 1893 test–match victory that saw them promoted to the First Division. Hill was a regular in the side for the following two seasons and despite starting the 1895–96 season as a first-choice striker, he was surprisingly transferred to Ardwick in November 1895 along with Joe Davies and Hugh Morris.

After two years at Ardwick, Hill spent a brief period with Watford St. Marys in 1898, before joining Millwall (1898–99) and then Brighton United (1899–1900). Then, Hill returned to his native Scotland to play for Dundee and finished his career with his home town club Forfar Athletic.

== Honours ==
Sheffield United

- Football League Division Two
  - Runner-up: 1892–93
