= Frank Gamble (footballer, born 1871) =

English footballer

Personal information
- Date of birth: 1871
- Place of birth: Worksop, England
- Position: Forward

Senior career*
Years	Team	Apps	(Gls)
1891–1893	Heeley		
1892–1893	→ Sheffield United (guest)	1	(0)
1893–1894	Worksop Town		
1894–1896	Sheffield United	3	(0)
1896	Oldham County		
1896–1897	Worksop Town		
1897–1898	Ilkeston Town		
1898–1899	Wombwell Town		
1899–1900	Mexborough		
- * Club domestic league appearances and goals

Frank Gamble (born 1871, date of death unknown) was a footballer who played in The Football League as an inside forward for Sheffield United.

Born in Worksop in Nottinghamshire, Gamble was playing for Sheffield side Heeley when he came to the attention of Sheffield United. United had just been accepted into the newly formed Second Division and registered Gamble as a guest player for the 1892–93 season. He made little impact, spending most of his time either in the reserves or playing for his parent club, making only one competitive start for the Blades in a Northern League fixture against Stockton.

Gamble was not retained by either United or Heeley at the end of that season and he subsequently spent a year playing for his home town club Worksop Town. Despite his lack of impact during his previous spell with Sheffield United they signed him for a second time in the summer of 1894, this time on a permanent contract. He spent two further seasons with the club but once again failed to make much impact, playing only three league games in two years. United lost all four competitive fixtures that Gamble had played for them in his two spells and his career at Bramall Lane was curtailed when he missed the train to Birmingham having been selected to play in a fixture there, after which he made only one more reserve appearance before being released.

Leaving United once more Gamble drifted back into the amateur game with short spells at Oldham County and a brief return to Worksop Town. He then spent a season at each of Ilkeston Town, Wombwell Town and Mexborough before retiring.
