= Joe Brady (footballer) =

English footballer

Personal information
- Full name: Joseph Brady
- Position: Midfielder

Senior career*
| Years | Team | Apps | (Gls) |
- Renton
| 1892–1893 | Sheffield United | 1 | (0) |
- * Club domestic league appearances and goals

Joseph Brady was an English professional footballer who played as an outside left or right for Sheffield United during the 1892–93 season. Registered at the start of the club's first campaign in The Football League, he struggled to break into the first team and made only ten appearances in total during the course of the season, although most of these were in friendlies. His only competitive games were against Newcastle United in the Northern League and against Sunderland in the FA Cup. Lacking the quality needed to play in the Football League, he was released in the summer of 1893.
