= Frederick H. Davies =

English footballer

Fred Davies
Personal information
- Full name: Frederick Hale Davies
- Date of birth: 1871
- Place of birth: Welshpool, Montgomeryshire
- Place of death: Brentford, Canada
- Position: Inside forward

Senior career*
Years	Team	Apps	(Gls)
- Ardwick
1891–1894	Sheffield United	21	(7)
1895	Baltimore Orioles		
- * Club domestic league appearances and goals

Frederick H. Davies was an English footballer who played as an inside forward for Sheffield United between 1891 and 1894.

Sheffield United signed Davies from the reserves of Lancashire side Ardwick in the summer of 1891 and despite featuring in some pre-season games Davies had to wait until April the following year to make his competitive debut for United in a Northern League match against Lincoln City.

Having played little during his first season at Bramall Lane he was to fare better the following term as he played regularly during United's first season in The Football League and was part of the side that finished second in the newly formed Second Division and gained promotion to the First Division.

With United now playing at the highest level of English football Davies found himself back in the reserves and with few first team opportunities. He opted to leave The Blades in October 1894 and decided to emigrate to the US with a number of other former Ardwick players to 'teach football'. In 1895 he signed for The Baltimore Orioles who played in the American League but the league quickly collapsed and the Orioles disbanded with the season uncompleted.
