= Joe Brady (snooker player) =

Irish snooker player

Joe Brady was an Irish player of English billiards and snooker. He held the Irish billiards championship title from 1908 to 1920, and played in the 1927 World Snooker Championship.

== Biography ==
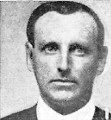
Brady

Brady was born in Belfast in 1877 to Henry, a labourer, and Eliza (née McKee) and was the youngest of nine siblings. He started playing English billiards when he was about 13. He became a billiard marker, and started playing exhibition matches. In 1908 he won the Irish championship, and held it until 1920. During World War I he served in the Royal Dublin Fusiliers, and participated in the Gallipoli campaign, being wounded in 1915. From 1918 to 1924 he managed the billiard hall at The Piccadilly Hotel, then moved to manage Claude Falkiner's billard hall in Liverpool.

Brady entered the 1927 World Snooker Championship. In the tournament, he faced Joe Davis on 29 and 30 December 1926 at Cable Street, Liverpool. Davis won all four frames in the afternoon and led 5–3 at the end of the first day. The match ended 10–5 on the second day, with Davis having achieved a winning margin at 8–5.
