= Thomas Lee (analyst) =

American businessman

Thomas Jong Lee
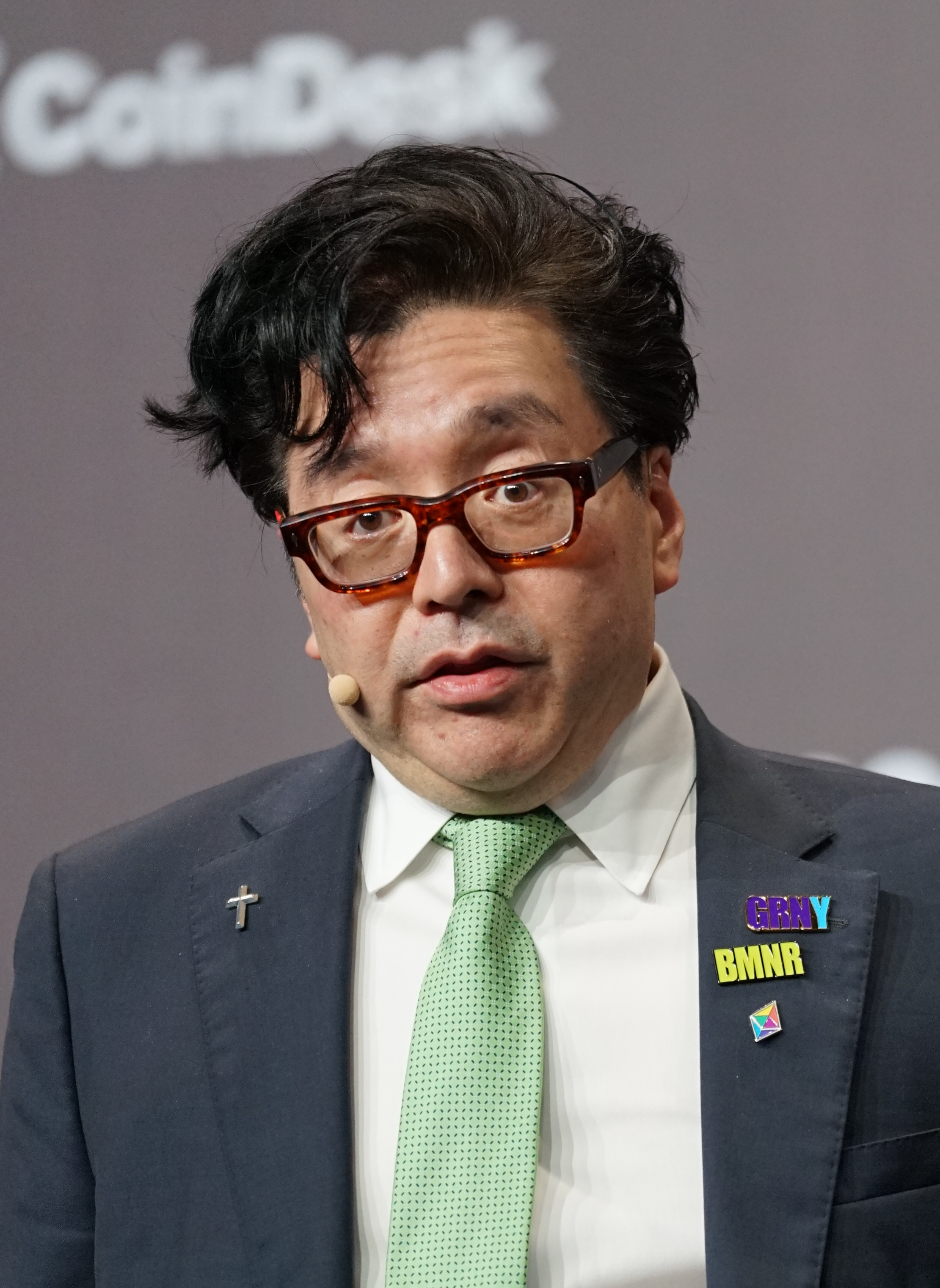
- Lee at Consensus HK 2026
- Born: Westland, Michigan
- Other name: Tom Lee
- Education: Wharton School of the University of Pennsylvania
- Occupations: Financial analyst and businessman
- Children: 3
- Website: www.fundstrat.com

Thomas Jong Lee, commonly known as Tom Lee, is an American financial analyst, businessman, and contributor on CNBC.

== Early life and education ==
Lee was born in Westland, MI, the third child of four siblings of Korean immigrant parents. His father was a retired psychiatrist and his mother a homemaker turned Subway franchise owner.

Lee received his BS in Economics from the Wharton School at the University of Pennsylvania with concentrations in Finance and Accounting. At UPenn, he joined Delta Upsilon Fraternity. He is a CFA charterholder.

== Business career ==
Lee started his career in the early 1990s at Kidder, Peabody & Company then later at Salomon Smith Barney. In 1999, he joined J.P. Morgan Chase & Co as chief equity strategist.

While at J.P. Morgan, Lee's research attracted critics. In 2002, a publicly listed company Nextel was critical of Lee's research. This discord gained national media attention and was profiled in the November 22, 2002 Wall Street Journal article, Unhappy Firm Bites Back: Nextel Says, Analyze This.

In 2014, Lee left J.P Morgan to start his own research boutique advisory firm.. He is the first major Wall Street Strategist to provide formal research coverage of Bitcoin to his clients which was covered by the media at that time and he has appeared on CNBC, Fox Business, Bloomberg, Yahoo Finance, and CNN among others.

Lee's retweets from James Todaro in early August 2020 sparked controversy as highlighted by the September 9, 2020 CNN article, A New Front in Coronavirus Disinformation: Wall Street Research stating Lee's retweets of Todaro's tweets as alleged coronavirus misinformation.

In 2021, Lee was profiled by national media including the Wall Street Journal which featured Lee as the cover article, Thomas Lee Said 'Buy' as COVID-19 Caused Stock Market Meltdown based on the investor response to several high-profile investment calls he made in 2020.

On June 30, 2025, Lee became chairman of the board of directors of BitMine Immersion Technologies, Inc.
