= Harry Hammond (footballer) =

English footballer

Personal information
- Full name: Walter Henry Hammond
- Date of birth: 1868
- Place of birth: Chorlton-cum-Hardy, Manchester, England
- Date of death: December 1921 (aged 52–53)
- Place of death: Bolton, England
- Position: Outside left

Senior career*
Years	Team	Apps	(Gls)
- Edge Hill
1889–1891	Everton	1	(0)
1891–1897	Sheffield United	132	(62)
1897–1900	New Brighton Tower	58	(29)
1900–1901	Leicester Fosse	4	(1)
Medal record
Sheffield United
Runner-up	Second Division	1893
- * Club domestic league appearances and goals

Walter Henry Hammond (1868 – December 1921) was an English footballer who played as an outside left. Born in Chorlton-cum-Hardy, Manchester he played for Everton, Sheffield United, New Brighton Tower and Leicester Fosse in The Football League between 1889 and 1901.

== Playing career ==
Hammond was a short-statured but dangerous outside left who started his career with non-league Edge Hill. He was signed by Everton in 1889, but only made one league appearance for the Merseyside team; playing against West Bromwich Albion in March 1890.

It was from Everton that Hammond signed for Sheffield United in the summer of 1891. United were looking for players to improve their squad for their first season in the Northern League and Hammond fitted the bill, appearing and scoring regularly in his first season with the club. By his second season United had been elected to The Football League and Hammond continued his successful run, retaining his place and scoring the side's first ever league hat-trick against Lincoln City in September 1892. He was to better that feat when he scored five goals in a league fixture with Bootle in November of the same year.

Hammond was a determined centre forward and was United's top scorer in three out of the club's first four Football League campaigns. He was also the first United player to receive a red card during a league fixture; although having been dismissed in an away fixture with Crewe in April 1892 Hammond actually believed his life was in danger and fled from the ground, hiding at Crewe station until the rest of the United party arrived. Hammond went on to score 64 goals from 142 league and cup games for United and represented the Football League against the Irish league whilst with the club.

In August 1897 Hammond signed for New Brighton Tower, representing them in the Lancashire League as they became champions, and representing them the following season after their election into the Football League. He made 58 appearances and scored 29 goals for New Brighton Tower before moving to Leicester Fosse in May 1900 where he finished his career. Hammond missed the majority of his time at Leicester after contracting typhoid fever, scoring once from only 4 league matches before retiring.

== Later career ==
After he finished playing football Hammond became a publican in Bolton where it was reported he died whilst playing billiards in his pub.

== Honours ==
Sheffield United

- Football League Division One
  - Runner-up: 1896–97
- Football League Division Two
  - Runner-up: 1892–93
