= Thomas Lee (footballer) =

English footballer

Personal information
- Date of birth: 1876
- Place of birth: Alnwick, England
- Height: 5 ft 8 in (1.73 m)
- Position: Wing half

Senior career*
Years	Team	Apps	(Gls)
1896–1897	Alnwick Town		
1897–1899	Sunderland	2	(0)
1899–1900	Bristol Rovers		
1900–1901	Hebburn Argyle		
1901–1902	South Shields		
1902–1903	Bristol Rovers		
1903–1904	Hebburn Argyle		
1904–1905	Millwall Athletic		
1905–19??	Ashington		
- * Club domestic league appearances and goals

Thomas Lee (born 1876) was an English professional footballer who played as a wing half for Sunderland.
