= Billy Croxon =

English footballer

Personal information
- Full name: William James F. Croxon
- Date of birth: 1871
- Place of birth: West Ham, Essex, England
- Date of death: 1949 (aged 78)
- Place of death: Sheffield, England
- Position: Midfielder

Senior career*
Years	Team	Apps	(Gls)
1891	Royal Arsenal		
1891–1892	Millwall		
1892	Illford		
1892–1894	Sheffield United	4	(0)
1894–1895	Rotherham Town	9	(0)
Medal record
Sheffield United
Runner-up	Second Division	1893
- * Club domestic league appearances and goals

William James F. Croxon (1871–1949) was an English footballer who played in The Football League for Sheffield United and Rotherham Town. Born in West Ham he played as an outside right and also had spells at Royal Arsenal and Millwall. Signed by United in the autumn of 1892, Croxon struggled to break into the first team as they played their first season in the Football League. He made his league debut in November 1892 in a game against Darwen, but played only three further league games in his two-year spell. Croxon moved to Rotherham Town in the summer of 1894, for whom he played nine league games before retiring.

In later life Croxon worked as a clerk in a Sheffield school and played cricket for Shiregreen.

== Honours ==
Sheffield United

- Football League Division Two
  - Runner-up: 1892–93
