= Arthur McCabe (footballer) =

English footballer

Personal information
- Full name: Arthur McCabe
- Date of birth: 1871
- Place of birth: Sheffield, England
- Date of death: 22 April 1930 (aged 59)
- Place of death: Eyam, England
- Position: Forward

Youth career
- Heeley

Senior career*
Years	Team	Apps	(Gls)
1891–1892	Rotherham Town		
1892–1895	Sheffield United	1	(0)
1895–1896	Rotherham Town	18	(0)
1896	Manchester City	1	(0)
1896–1897	Ilkeston Town		
- * Club domestic league appearances and goals

Arthur McCabe (1871 – 22 April 1930) was an English footballer who played as an outside left. Born in Sheffield, McCabe started his career with local side Heeley before spending time with Rotherham Town.

It was from Rotherham that his home town club Sheffield United signed him in July 1892. United were now a Football League side and McCabe was unable to break into the first team, spending the majority of his time at Bramall Lane playing in the reserves. His only competitive start for the Blades came in a Northern League fixture in January 1893, but despite this he remained with the club until July 1895.

United allowed McCabe to return to Rotherham Town, for whom he made 18 league appearances before joining Manchester City in January 1896. His time with Manchester City was unsuccessful and he made only one further league appearance for the Lancashire club before joining Ilkeston Town the following summer.

In his later years, McCabe operated hotels in Sheffield. In 1930, McCabe was found dead with a self-inflicted stab wound to his throat in his home. He was found with a razor in his hand.
