= Croxon, Jones & Co (Old Bank) Ltd =

- Trade name: Croxon, Jones & Co (Old Bank) Ltd; Oswestry Old Bank
- Company type: Private company
- Industry: Financial services
- Predecessor: Gibbons & Coit
- Founded: 1792
- Defunct: 1894
- Fate: Merger
- Successor: Parr’s Banking Co & Alliance Bank Ltd
- Headquarters: Oswestry, United Kingdom
- Area served: England and Wales
- Products: Lending and deposits
- Services: Banking services
- Website: RBS archives

Croxon, Jones & Co (Old Bank) was a British private bank established in Oswestry. It operated between 1792 and 1894.

== History ==
It was originally known as Gibbons & Coit and, in 1893, was converted into a joint-stock company with limited liability and a paid-in capital of £35,000. Upon conversion the bank was renamed Croxon, Jones & Co (Old Bank) Ltd.

The bank went through a number of name changes during its 100-year history:

- Gibbons & Coit from 1792
- Croon & Sheppard by 1812
- Croxon & Co by 1814
- Croxon, Longueville, Jones, Croxon & Gibbons by 1829
- Croxon, Longueville & Co by 1834
- Swete, Roberts & Longueville by 1887
- Croxon, Jones & Co in 1893

The bank was also known as Oswestry Old Bank.

In 1894 the bank was acquired by Parr's Banking Co & Alliance Bank Ltd of Warrington and the bank subsequently became a past constituent of NatWest.

The bank's archives are held by RBS and Shropshire Archives.
