= Rab Howell =

English footballer (1867–1937)

- Rab Howell

Personal information
- Full name: Rabbi Howell
- Date of birth: 25 October 1867
- Place of birth: Dore, Sheffield, England
- Date of death: 21 July 1937 (aged 69)
- Place of death: Preston, Lancashire, England
- Height: 5 ft 5 in (1.65 m)
- Position: Centre half

Youth career
- 1887–1889: Ecclesfield

Senior career*
Years	Team	Apps	(Gls)
1889–1890	Rotherham Swifts		
1890–1898	Sheffield United	192	(8)
1898–1901	Liverpool	59	(0)
1901–1903	Preston North End	60	(1)

International career
1895–1899	England	2	(1)
Medal record
Sheffield United
Runner-up	Second Division	1893
Runner-up	First Division	1897
Winner	First Division	1898
- * Club domestic league appearances and goals

Rabbi "Rab" Howell (12 October 1867 – 21 July 1937) was a nineteenth-century professional footballer who played for Sheffield United and Liverpool primarily as a defender. Born in Dore in Sheffield, he was of Romani descent and was the first Romani to play for England, winning two caps.

== Club career ==
=== Sheffield United ===
Howell was a highly skilled player despite his small size (5 feet 5 inches or 1.65 metres), playing as a nippy half-back or inside right. He began his career with the Sheffield club Ecclesfield and also played for Rotherham Swifts before signing along with two other Swifts players, Arthur Watson and Michael Whitham for newly formed Sheffield United in March 1890. Although he made his debut as a striker Howell was soon moved to defence where he played for the remainder of his career. He won promotion with the Blades to the First Division in 1893, and, in 1897–98, a Championship medal.

"Rab Howell," observed the player's Sheffield United teammate Ernest Needham,

"a gypsy by birth, perhaps owes some of his inexhaustible vitality to his lucky parentage. Certain it is that no man is more untiring. In his right-hand position this light-weight player (9st.12lbs or 57.3 kg.) always excels. He rejoices at meeting the best of forward wings, and should the outside man indulge in dribbling he sticks to him like a leech. Many duels have I seen between him and Fred (Spiksley of The Wednesday), and generally Howell has come off best. Unfortunately he is a little too fond of keeping the ball too long, and loses many opportunities."

Howell often fell foul of the club hierarchy who imposed strict codes of conduct on their players, and regularly appeared in front of the Football Committee on charges of 'misconduct' although this often resulted in him being offered a pay increase and asked to 'mend his ways'. More serious allegations were to be levelled at him however, as in his final season at the club he was believed to have attempted to throw a game against rivals for the Championship Sunderland, scoring two own goals. No charges were ever brought but Howell only played one more game for United before being quietly sold to Liverpool. He left Bramall Lane having played for 5 years, making over 200 appearances for the club. There is no evidence of match fixing, however. A more likely explanation for his sudden departure is his extra-marital affair: he set up another family in Lancashire after he left for Liverpool. Such a scandal in Victorian times would have been hushed up.

=== Liverpool and Preston North End ===
In April 1898 Howell was transferred to Liverpool for a fee of £200, making his debut for the club in a game against Aston Villa. He played 68 times for Liverpool, scoring no goals. Three years later he moved on to Preston North End, where his career was ended by broken leg in 1903.

== International career ==
Howell scored once for the national team, on his debut in a 9–0 rout of Ireland in April 1895. His second and last appearance came in a win against Scotland four years later.

=== International goals ===
#	Date	Venue	Opponent	Result	Competition	Scored
1	9 March 1895	County Cricket Club, Derby	Ireland	9–0	Home Championship	1

== Honours ==
Sheffield United

- Football League champions: 1897–98

== Personal life ==
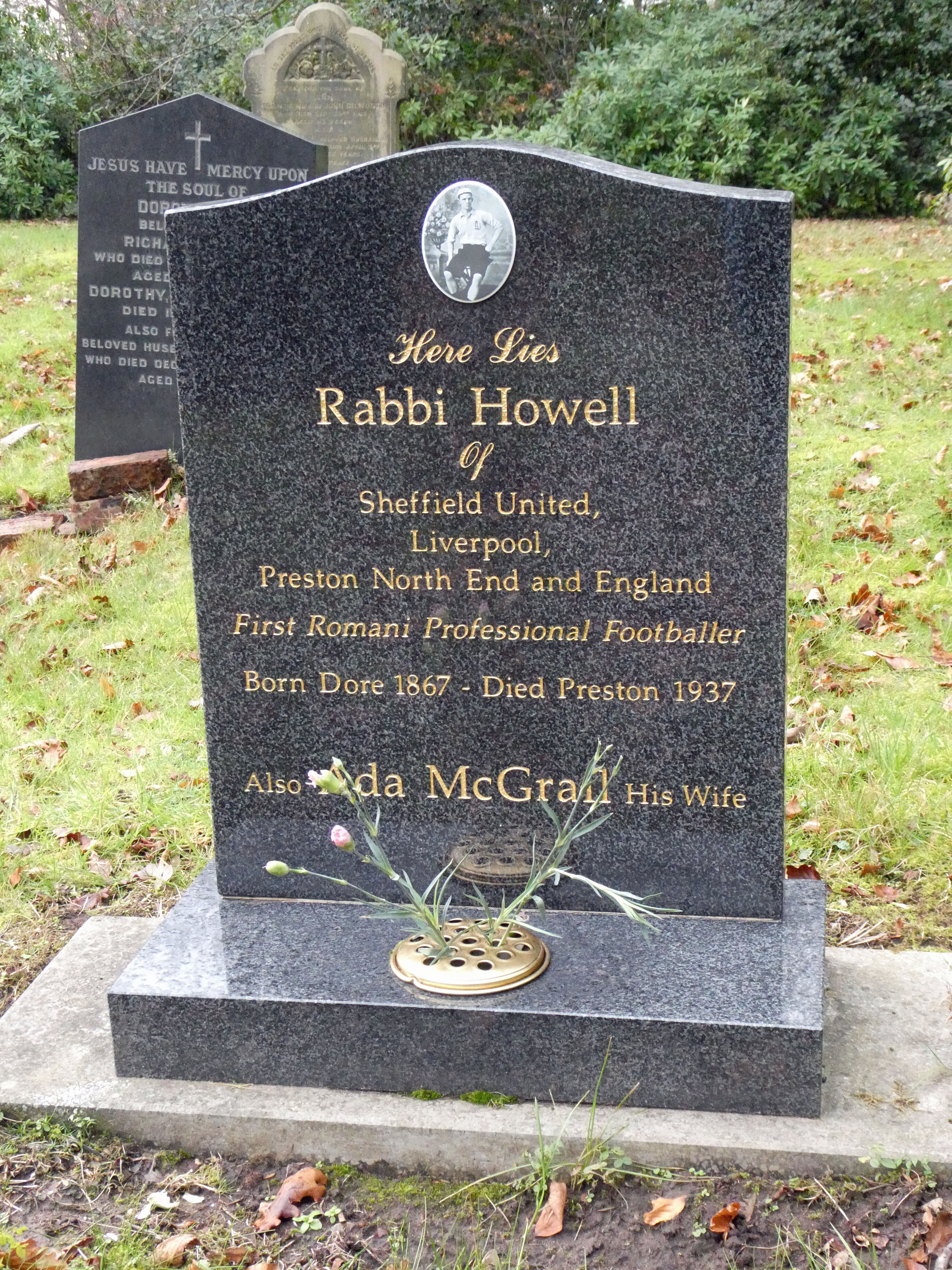
Gravestone of Rabbi Howell at Preston Old Cemetery.

It seems likely that Howell was born, and lived as a child, in a Romani encampment in Sheffield. His father's profession is listed on his birth certificate as a "besom-maker." By the time of the 1871 census, however, the family were living in a house in Stocks Hill in Ecclesfield. Some of the misinformation about Rab comes from people believing an interview he gave to a match day programme in 1897 where he says amongst other things, spinning people along, that he lived in a caravan: which he clearly did not as census returns show.

== Death ==
After giving up football, Howell worked as a general labourer and night watchman, retiring c. 1931. By late 1936 he was in poor health and almost blind, but maintained a keen interest in football and had sports news read to him by members of his family. He died on 21 July 1937 at his home in Preston, aged 69. Howell was buried in an unmarked grave at Preston Old Cemetery, however in 2015 a headstone was unveiled during a ceremony following a campaign to raise money.
