= Arthur Watson (footballer, died 1931) =

English footballer

Personal information
- Full name: Arthur Watson
- Date of birth: 1870
- Place of birth: Ecclesfield, Sheffield, England
- Date of death: 3 June 1931 (aged 60–61)
- Place of death: Sheffield, England
- Position: Inside left

Senior career*
Years	Team	Apps	(Gls)
1887–1889	Ecclesfield		
1889–1890	Rotherham Swifts		
1890–1896	Sheffield United	93	(31)
1896–1898	West Bromwich Albion	26	(2)
1898–1899	Lincoln City		
1899–1900	Sheffield United	0	(0)
Medal record
Sheffield United
Runner-up	Second Division	1893
- * Club domestic league appearances and goals

Arthur Watson (1870 – 3 June 1931) was an English footballer who played the majority of his career at Sheffield United as an inside left. Born in Ecclesfield in Sheffield, he also had spells at his local side Ecclesfield as well as Rotherham Swifts, West Bromwich Albion and Lincoln City.

== Playing career ==
Watson started his career playing for his local team in his home parish of Ecclesfield. From there he transferred to Rotherham Swifts in the summer of 1889. The Swifts found themselves in financial difficulties over the course of the season and Watson was sold, along with fellow former Ecclesfield players Rab Howell and Michael Whitham, to recently formed Sheffield United in March 1890.

Small, fast and with a hard shot Watson was a regular in the Blades side for the following three seasons as the side first entered The Football League. He played in the test match with Accrington Stanley in 1893, which having won saw the Blades promoted to Division One for the first time in their history. Injuries unfortunately kept Watson sidelined for the entire of the following season but he returned to action by August 1894 and was again virtually ever present for another two years.

Having been released by United Watson was signed by West Bromwich Albion with whom he spent two seasons and represented them in The Football League. A season at Lincoln City followed before recurring injuries all but forced him to retire from first team football. He did return to Sheffield United for a further season, offering to play for the reserves without pay with only a benefit match as compensation - an offer United accepted, the game taking place in January 1900.

== Honours ==
Sheffield United

- Football League Division Two
  - Runner-up: 1892–93
