= Samuel Dobson =

English footballer

Personal information
- Full name: Samuel Dobson
- Place of birth: Preston, England
- Positions: Inside left; inside right

Senior career*
Years	Team	Apps	(Gls)
1889–1890	Crewe Alexandra		
1890–1891	Preston North End		
1891–1893	Sheffield United	29	(13)
Medal record
Sheffield United
Runner-up	Second Division	1893
- * Club domestic league appearances and goals

Samuel Dobson also known as Sammy Dobson was an English footballer who played as an inside left or inside right. Born in Preston he appeared for Crewe Alexandra, Preston North End and Sheffield United.

== Playing career ==
=== Club career ===
Dobson made his senior debut for Crewe Alexandra in the Football Alliance, scoring in his first game against Walsall Swifts in September 1889. After one season with Crewe he moved to his home town club of Preston North End in the summer of 1890. It was with Preston that he made his Football League debut; a 3–1 victory over Derby County on 20 September 1889; again scoring in his first game.

In the spring of 1891, Dobson was one of three players signed at the instigation of Sheffield United chairman Charles Stokes who wished to use the club's relative financial power to build a strong professional team capable of success in league football. Dobson's first competitive game for The Blades came on 23 March 1891 in a 2–2 draw with Burton Wanderers. Considered a fine shot, Dobson was a regular during the 1891–92 season during which United competed in the Northern League and appeared in The Blades' first ever Football League game the following season. His appearances became more infrequent however and his last game came in October 1893. It is thought that United retained Dobson's registration until 1895, but he had retired through injury and returned to Preston where he became a groundsman at Deepdale.

=== International career ===
Dobson was selected for an England trial in February 1892 but did not attend due to illness.

== Professional Baseball ==
In 1890 Dobson played centre field professionally for Preston North End Baseball Club. in the National League of Baseball of Great Britain.

== Honours ==
Sheffield United

- Football League Division Two
  - Runner-up: 1892–93
