= George Waller (footballer) =

English footballer and cricketer

Personal information
- Date of birth: 3 December 1864
- Place of birth: Pitsmoor, Sheffield, England
- Date of death: 10 December 1937 (aged 73)
- Place of death: Ecclesfield, Sheffield, England
- Height: 5 ft 10 in (1.78 m)
- Positions: Half back; goalkeeper

Youth career
- Pitsmoor Christ Church
- 1883–1884: Pyebank

Senior career*
Years	Team	Apps	(Gls)
1885–1890	The Wednesday		
1890–1892	Middlesbrough		
1892–1915	Sheffield United	10	(2)
Medal record
Sheffield United
Runner-up	Second Division	1893
- * Club domestic league appearances and goals

George Waller (3 December 1864 – 11 December 1937) was an English footballer and first-class cricketer. Born in Pitsmoor, Sheffield Waller played for both The Wednesday (with whom he played in the 1890 FA Cup final) and Sheffield United in his home town, as well as a spell with Middlesbrough. He was appointed as first team trainer at Sheffield United in 1894, helping the team to one championship and four FA Cup victories in a 36-year tenure. Waller also played cricket for Sheffield United Cricket Club and a number of matches for Yorkshire.

== Football career ==
=== Playing career ===
Having started his playing career with his local church, Waller was signed by Sheffield's leading side The Wednesday in 1885. He played regularly, spending five years with the club, culminating in an appearance in the 1890 FA Cup final. This was to prove his last game for the club and, with his contract expired, he intended to sign for newly formed Sheffield United. Issues with the paperwork and his registration, however, meant that the deal fell through and instead he joined Middlesbrough where he played for a further two seasons.

Waller finally joined United in August 1892, signed as captain of the reserves; the Sheffield Strollers. Despite his role in the reserves Waller regularly played for the first team during his first two seasons, usually in friendly fixtures but he did also play a number of games in The Football League. Primarily a defender, Waller agreed to play in goal in March 1894 for a fixture against Newton Heath due to an injury crisis. United won the fixture 2–0 and Waller impressed to the point that he was selected in goal for the next two fixtures, despite experienced keepers being available once more.

He began to play more infrequently over the following seasons, but despite wearing borrowed boots, he did score in his last league appearance. Concentrating on his role as club trainer, Waller remained registered by United as a player until 1915 and made occasional appearances for the Strollers.

=== Coaching career ===
For almost the first 45 years of its existence, Sheffield United did not employ what would be described in the modern game as a manager. Instead the duties associated with a manager were split across a number of people, in the same structure utilised by Sheffield United Cricket Club from where the football club had grown. The team was selected by a committee, while transfers, dealings with the FA and the day-to-day running of the club were undertaken by the club secretary. The players were coached by a trainer, and it was this position that was offered to George Waller in the close season of 1894.

The club had been impressed by Waller's fitness, his knowledge of the game and his willingness to learn, and his appointment would soon reap dividends. Using his experience of football and cricket he quickly became respected as one of the foremost – what would now be termed – physiotherapists operating in the game. His use of science and modern techniques led players to refer to his as having 'magic hands' and he would often be consulted by sportsmen, athletes and dancers from across the country.

Waller's other role was, alongside the team captain, to train the players and work on matchday tactics, and under his tutelage the team achieved a sustained period of success. The First Division championship was achieved in 1898 and the club won the FA Cup in 1899 and 1902, along with a losing final appearance in 1901, and United could field a team packed with internationals.

Waller was a tactical innovator, and introduced the idea of using one inside forward to play in a deeper role, capable of accurate passing, who could bring faster wide men into play, often with long cross–field balls. This would remain United's style of play well into the 1930s and only began to change following Waller's departure in 1930.

=== Honours ===
Sheffield United

- Football League Division Two
  - Runner-up: 1892–93

== Cricket career ==
Waller played three matches for Yorkshire County Cricket Club in 1893 and 1894. He took four wickets with his right arm medium pace at 17.50, and he scored seventeen runs at 4.25, with a best innings score of 13. He played for the Yorkshire Second XI, and for Yorkshire in some non-first-class games, from 1893 to 1897.

== Personal life ==
Waller ran a sports shop near Bramall Lane in his later years and died in Sheffield in December 1937.
