= William Shuttleworth (footballer) =

English footballer (1868–1929)

Personal information
- Full name: William Shuttleworth
- Date of birth: 1868
- Place of birth: Kelbrook, England
- Date of death: 1929 (aged 60–61)
- Position: Wing half

Senior career*
Years	Team	Apps	(Gls)
1890–1893	Accrington	39	(0)
- * Club domestic league appearances and goals

William Shuttleworth (1868–1929) was an English footballer who played in the Football League for Accrington.
