= Thomas Leigh =

Thomas Leigh, Tommy Leigh, or Tom Leigh may refer to:

- Sir Thomas Leigh (died 1545), English ambassador and lawyer
- Thomas Leigh (Lord Mayor) (c. 1509–1572), Lord Mayor of London in 1558
- Thomas Leigh (MP for Bedford) (1512–1571), MP for Bedford, 1553–1559, Sheriff 1571
- Thomas Leigh, 1st Baron Leigh (1595–1672), English politician who sat in the House of Commons from 1628 to 1629
- Thomas Pemberton Leigh, 1st Baron Kingsdown (1793–1867), eldest son of Thomas Pemberton
- Tommy Leigh (footballer, born 1875) (1875–1914), English footballer
- Tommy Leigh (footballer, born 1877) (1877-1914), English footballer, see List of Fulham F.C. players (1–24 appearances)
- Tom Leigh (RAF officer) (1919–1944), Australian-born airman
- Tommy Leigh (footballer, born 2000), English footballer

== See also ==
- Thomas Lee (disambiguation)
- Thomas Legh (disambiguation)
