= John Drummond (footballer) =

Scottish footballer

Personal information
- Date of birth: 15 March 1869
- Place of birth: Edinburgh, Scotland
- Position: Midfielder

Senior career*
| Years | Team | Apps | (Gls) |
| 1889–1890 | Partick Thistle | | |
| 1890–1891 | Preston North End | | |
| 1891–1894 | Sheffield United | 70 | (20) |
| 1894–1895 | Liverpool | 14 | (1) |
| 1895–1897 | Barnsley St. Peter's | | |
Medal record
Sheffield United
| Runner-up | Second Division | 1893 |
- * Club domestic league appearances and goals

John Drummond (born 15 March 1869 - living 1947) was a Scottish footballer who played as a midfielder. Born in Edinburgh, Scotland he had spells with Partick Thistle, Preston North End, Sheffield United, Liverpool and Barnsley St. Peter's before retiring.

== Playing career ==
Drummond began his career at Scottish club Partick Thistle in 1889 before moving South of the border to sign for Lancashire club Preston North End, with whom he made a scoring debut in The Football League against West Bromwich Albion on 13 September 1890.

Drummond was one of three players signed from Preston by Sheffield United in the spring of 1891 after chairman Charles Stokes decided the club needed to use its financial position to attract more capable players as the club looked for election to the Football League. He became a regular in the side for the following seasons and at the end of the 1892–93 season he scored the only goal as United took on Accrington in a test match which saw The Blades promoted to Division One for the first time in their history. Anecdotal reports of the match said that the pitch was in a terrible state and Drummond was almost the only player to be able to keep his feet, something that he attributed to painting the soles of his boots with black lead to prevent the mud from sticking. He went on to make 89 competitive appearances for the club and scored 24 goals.

Drummond joined Liverpool in the summer of 1884 for whom he made 18 appearances in total, scoring one goal. After one season on Merseyside he returned to Yorkshire to sign for Barnsley St. Peter's where he saw out the remainder of his career.

== Personal life ==
Drummond had been an apprentice shipyard carpenter as a boy and returned to work in the Dumbarton shipyards after his retirement from football, reportedly working until the age of 78.

== Professional baseball ==
Drummond played Second base for Preston North End Baseball Club in the 1890 1890 National League of Baseball of Great Britain, spending most of his time in the amateur team, who won the amateur national championship.

== Honours ==
Sheffield United

- Football League Division Two
  - Runner-up: 1892–93
