= Tom Lea (footballer) =

English footballer

Personal information
- Full name: Thomas Lea
- Place of birth: England
- Position: Winger

Senior career*
Years	Team	Apps	(Gls)
1892–1893	Accrington	29	(6)
1893	West Manchester		
- * Club domestic league appearances and goals

Thomas Lea was an English footballer who played in the Football League for Accrington.
