= Thomas Hong-Chi Lee =

Taiwanese-American historian (born 1945)

- Born: 5 March 1945 (age 81); Tainan, Taiwan
- Citizenship: American
- Education: National Taiwan University (BA); Yale University (PhD)
- Spouse: Nina Lee
- Scientific career
- Fields: Chinese history
- Workplaces: City College of New York
- Thesis: Education in Northern Sung China (1974)
- Doctoral advisor: Arthur F. Wright
- Other academic advisors: Jonathan Spence

Chinese name
- Traditional Chinese: 李弘祺
Transcriptions
Standard Mandarin
- Hanyu Pinyin: Lǐ Hóngqí
- Wade–Giles: Li^{3} Hung^{2}-chi^{2}
Southern Min
- Hokkien POJ: Li Hông-kî

Thomas Hong-Chi Lee (Chinese: 李弘祺; Pe̍h-ōe-jī: Li Hông-kî; born March 5, 1945) is a Taiwanese-American historian of Chinese education and related aspects of traditional Chinese culture. He has taught world history and early modern European intellectual history in the US, as well as in Taiwan and in China.

== Early life and education ==
Lee was born in Tainan, Taiwan. After graduating from National Tainan First Senior High School in 1962, he studied electrical engineering at National Cheng Kung University, but transferred to National Taiwan University in 1964 to study history. After receiving his bachelor's degree in 1968, he completed doctoral studies in the United States, earning his Ph.D. in history in 1974 from Yale University, where he worked mainly with Arthur F. Wright, but also took courses from Jonathan Spence, Franklin L. Baumer, Jaroslav Pelikan, and Peter Gay. His doctoral dissertation was titled, "Education in northern Sung China".

== Career ==
He taught at the Chinese University of Hong Kong, from 1974 to 1991. After 1991 he taught at the City College of New York, and the Graduate Center, both of The City University of New York until he took an early retirement to return to Taiwan (in 2007). He served as a visiting professor in Taiwan, China, and Germany, and has given lectures in China, Japan, Korea, Germany, as well as the US and Taiwan. He retired from National Tsing Hua University of Taiwan in 2015.

== Publications ==
His major publications include two books on Chinese education, each on the Song dynasty, and on traditional China (from the first millennium BCE to the 17th century CE). Both are in English and then translated into Chinese. The Chinese version of the latter has been awarded the “Outstanding Achievement in Sinology” Prize (2015) and then “Wenjin" Prize of the National Library of China (2017). This work is also widely circulated in Japan, where he has been acclaimed as “The first person today in the scholarship of Chinese education and examinations.”

Lee has also published on Song Chinese historical thought and on Sino-European cultural relations, as well as many articles in academic journals. After retirement in 2015, he has been writing as a public intellectual, and has given three Lecture Series on modern European thought in the prestigious TSMC Foundation Lecture Series (2014, 2015 and 2017) in Taiwan. His essays on contemporary intellectual matters in Taiwan and China are regularly featured in Alumni Bimonthly of National Taiwan University and in the web-journal, Voicettank.org (思想坦克).

== Bibliography ==
=== Books ===
- Government Education and Examinations in Sung China. Chinese University Press. 1985. ISBN 978-962-201-302-5.
- Education in Traditional China: A History. BRILL. 2000. ISBN 978-90-04-10363-4.

=== As editor ===
- China and Europe: Images and Influences in Sixteenth to Eighteenth Centuries. Chinese University Press. 1991. ISBN 978-962-201-465-7.
- The New and the Multiple: Sung Senses of the Past. Chinese University Press. 2004. ISBN 978-962-996-096-4.

=== Chinese publications ===
- 宋代教育散論 (in Chinese (Taiwan)). 東昇出版事業公司. 1980.
- 讀史的樂趣. 允晨文化實業股份有限公司. 1992. ISBN 9789579027465.
- 宋代官學教育與科舉 (in Chinese (Taiwan)). 聯經出版事業公司. 1994. ISBN 9570808845.
- 面向世界：現代性、歷史與最後的真理 (in Chinese (Taiwan)). 允晨文化實業股份有限公司. 2002. ISBN 9570329300.
- 學以為己：傳統中國的教育 (in Chinese). 香港中文大學出版社. 2012. 華東師範大學. 2017 ISBN 9787567532656.
- 卷里營營: 歷史, 教育與文化演講集 (in Chinese (Taiwan)). 允晨文化實業股份有限公司. 2012. ISBN 978-986-6274-67-1.
- 想象⌈音辨才博⌋，李弘祺談史、論藝、述學集 (in Chinese (Taiwan)). 商周出版. 2022. ISBN 978-626-318-217-2.

==== As editor ====
- 史學與史學方法論集 (in Chinese (Taiwan)). 食貨出版社. 1980.
- 中國教育史英文著作評介 (in Chinese (Taiwan)). 臺灣大學出版中心. 2005. ISBN 978-986-00-2373-2.

==== As translator ====
- 中國的自由傳統 (The Liberal Tradition of China) by Wm. Theodore de Bary (in Chinese (Taiwan)). 香港中文大學出版社. 2015.
- 人的現象（The Phenomenon of Man; Le Phénomène Humain）by Pierre Teilhard de Chardin. 臺北聯經出版社. 1983.
