= Edward Diggle =

English billiards player (1864–1934)

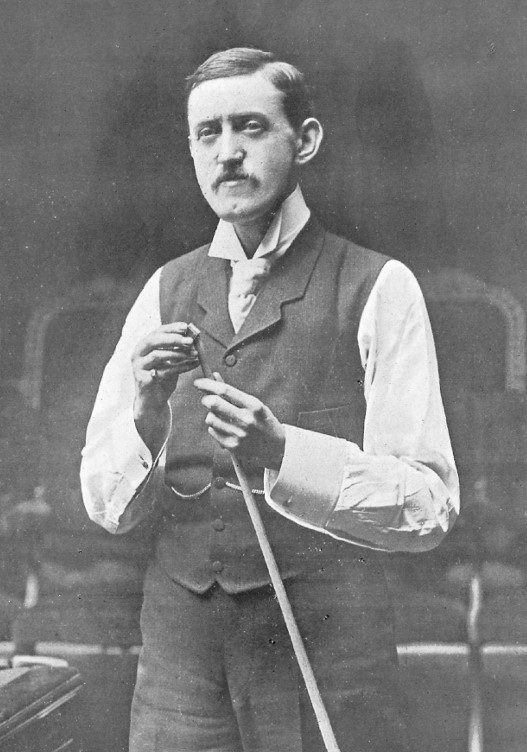
Diggle

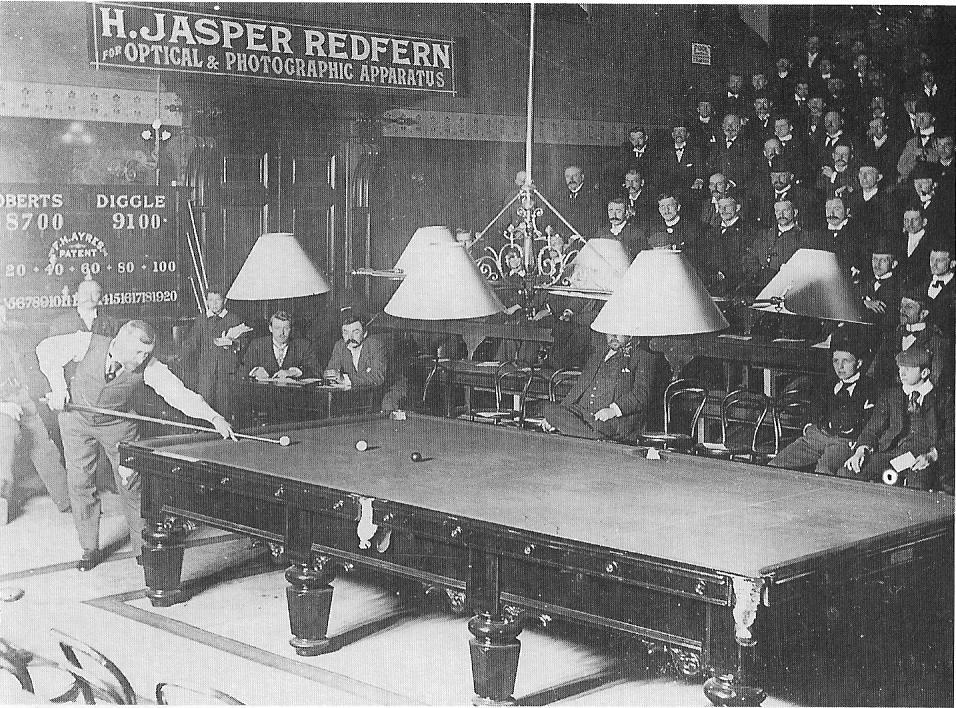
A billiards match between Diggle and John Roberts Jr.

Edward Diggle (1864–1934) was an English billiards player, known as "The Mechanical Methodical Mancunian".

Diggle was a protégé of John Roberts Jr., and became his regular practice partner. He is described by cue sports historian Clive Everton as "a languid, wry man with a casual, half upright [playing] style with both legs inelegantly bent." In 1895, Diggle set the record for the break on a standard billiard table when he compiled a 985 against Roberts. Willie Smith credited Diggle's top of the table, a method to increase breaks, as being an integral part of his own style.
