= 1890–91 Sheffield United F.C. season =

Sheffield United
1890–91 season
- Chairman: Michael Ellison
- Secretary: Joseph Wostinholm
- Midland Counties League: 5th
- FA Cup: First round (eliminated by Notts County)
- Sheffield Challenge Cup: Runners up (beaten by Doncaster Rovers)
- Wharncliffe Charity Cup: Semi-final (eliminated by The Wednesday
- Top goalscorer: League: Watson (10); All: Watson (13)
- Highest home attendance: League: 5,700 (v Derby Junction); Friendly: 14,000 (v The Wednesday)
- Lowest home attendance: League: 500 (v Kidderminster)
- Average home league attendance: 3,244 (League)
Home colours

The 1890–91 season was Sheffield United's second, and their first and only season playing in the newly formed Midland Counties League, as the club sought to establish itself as a major footballing force. The team was selected by the club's football committee and coached by a trainer, but day-to-day affairs were overseen by club secretary Joseph Wostinholm. The club saw a large influx of players during the season as it continued to bolster its numbers with amateurs loaned or signed from other teams in the local area, a policy that resulted in an unsettled side, indifferent league results, and a mid-table finish.

United (nicknamed the Blades) entered the FA Cup once more but were lucky to reach the first round proper, losing to Burton Swifts during qualifying only to see the Staffordshire club disqualified. They also competed in the Wharncliffe Charity Cup and the Sheffield Challenge Cup, in which they were beaten finalists for the second year in succession.

The development of the playing squad continued with the signings of John Drummond and Billy Hendry from Preston North End, who brought experience and a solid professionalism. Harry Lilley was recruited in the early part of the season, and became a regular in United's defence for several seasons.

== Background ==
After a first season of mixed fortunes on the field the football committee recognised the appetite amongst the Sheffield public for the game, as attendances at Bramall Lane had steadily increased. They recognised that league football was essential to grow that interest and offer a better standard of opposition, and had therefore joined the recently created Midland Counties League, although still insisting on organising numerous friendly fixtures. The committee continued to select the team, although J. B. Wostinholm oversaw the day–to–day running of the club.

== Kit ==
Although United's jersey remained predominantly white, thin red vertical stripes were introduced for the first time, which evolved into the solid red and white stripes that the team still plays in today. The team retained the blue shorts and socks worn in the previous season.

== Season overview ==
=== Midland Counties League ===
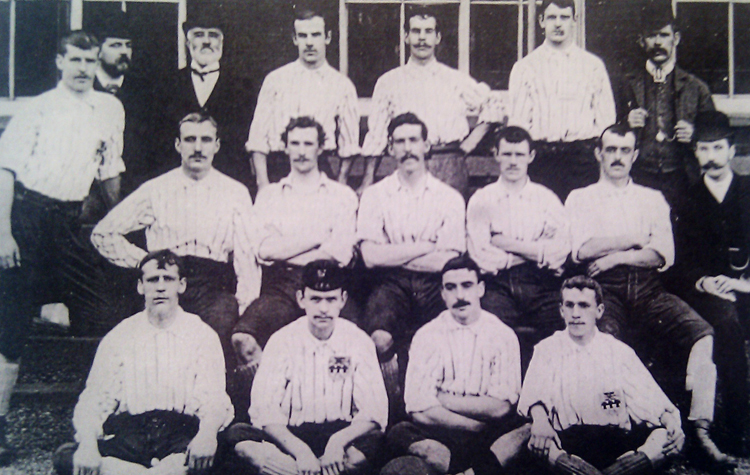
The United squad from 1890 to 1891. Pictured are: [rear] Harry Lilley, Charles Stokes (Chairman of Football Committee), JB Wostinholm (Club Secretary), Will Lilley, Charlie Howlett, Mick Whitham, Jack Houseley (trainer) [centre]: Unknown, Unknown, Unknown, Rab Howell, Unknown, H. Stones (Assist. Secretary) [Front]: Unknown, Unknown, Arthur Watson, Unknown

The previous season had been considered reasonably successful, but United still looked to improve the quality of players in the squad. The players recruited from Scotland during the previous summer had failed to live up to expectations and the majority of them were released; only Calder and Robertson were retained. Billy Bridgewater and Edward Cross were signed from nearby Rotherham Town, and Harry Lilley arrived from Staveley during the close season, but the Blades persisted with their policy of utilising guest amateur players from the local area.

United were now playing in the Midland Counties League but results were indifferent, with the Blades winning only twice in their opening eight fixtures. Their fortunes began to improve in November and December however as they registered a series of victories including an impressive 4–0 win over Kidderminster at Bramall Lane and a 5–2 victory at Derby Midland. Despite the relative failure of their previous recruitment in Scotland, by the end of the year United had signed Gavin Crawford and Harry Munro from north of the border as the Blades entered 1891 in more positive form.

Following a league fixture break during January 1891 United resumed their campaign in February, but the form they had shown in the run up to Christmas deserted them, and results were inconsistent. In the midst of congested fixture list the Blades finished the season fifth in the league (out of ten sides) and once again resolved to improve the quality of players by recruiting established professionals ahead of the next season. They duly negotiated the transfers of John Drummond, Billy Hendry and Samuel Dobson from Preston North End, then one of the top sides in the country, and they arrived over a number of weeks through February and March to bolster United's first team options. The most significant signing during the season was that of a young Ernest Needham from Staveley in February 1891. Although he did not play for United in the 1890–91 season he went on to become one of the club's greatest players, making more than 500 appearances.

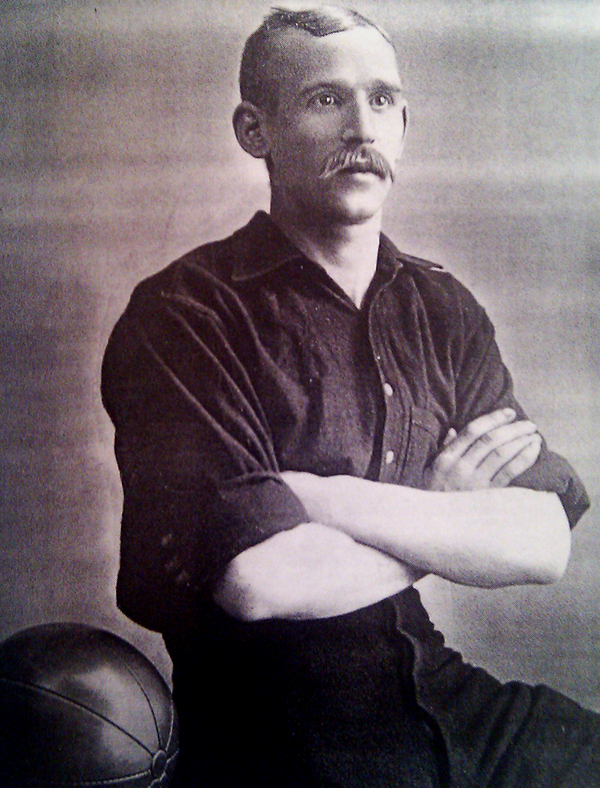
Gavin Crawford arrived from Farfield Rangers in Scotland in November 1890 to bolster the attack.

=== FA Cup ===
Having had relative success during their first FA Cup campaign the previous season United struggled to replicate that form and were fortunate to make it past the qualifying rounds in 1890. Having narrowly defeated Derby Junction they lost 2–1 to Burton Swifts in the next game, but the Staffordshire club was subsequently disqualified for fielding an ineligible player. Matlock and Loughborough were then easily despatched as United reached the first round proper of the cup for the second time. This was as far as the Blades would progress however, as they met Notts County at Bramall Lane in mid–January only to be trounced 9–1 by the visitors, a result that remains the club's worst in the competition.

=== Local cups ===
United once again entered the Sheffield Challenge Cup and reached the final for the second season in succession. After a straightforward 7–1 victory over Attercliffe in round one the Blades made their way past Kilnhurst in the semi-final at the second time of asking. On 21 March they met near neighbours Doncaster Rovers in the final, but despite having home advantage, with the game being played at Bramall Lane, United lost 2–1.

The team entered the Wharncliffe Charity Cup at the semi-final stage but were drawn against established cross-city rivals The Wednesday. Despite increasing rivalry between the clubs, a relatively small crowd of just over 3,000 spectators were present at Wednesday's Olive Grove ground to watch them beat United 2–1.

=== Friendlies ===
Despite now playing competitive league football United continued to fill the fixture list with numerous friendlies, which ultimately led to them playing 64 first-team games over the course of eight months. There was a noticeable improvement in the quality of opposition however, as a number of the more established professional teams visited Bramall Lane during the first half of the season, drawing reasonable crowds in the process. Although there were early season losses to Everton and Preston North End, United secured victories against Bolton Wanderers and Derby County, both at the time members of the Football League First Division.

The second half of the season saw a continued run of exhibition games but the quality of opposition was, at times, not as high. Despite lesser opposition, results tailed off as the fixture congestion these games created began to take its toll on the squad, most notably at the point when United's involvement in the Sheffield Challenge Cup meant that they had two first-team games scheduled for the same day. Rather than cancelling the pre-arranged friendlies the Blades went ahead with both fixtures, splitting the first team between them. The highlight of the fixture calendar did result from a friendly match however, as a then record 14,000 Sheffielders were present at Bramall Lane in January to watch United beat local rivals The Wednesday for the first time, running out 3–2 victors. January also saw United take on their first ever non–English team when they played Scottish side Linthouse, although the match was limited to only 35 minutes each way owing to poor light.

== Squad ==
=== First team ===
Note: Flags indicate national team as defined under FIFA eligibility rules; some limited exceptions apply. Players may hold more than one non-FIFA nationality.

Pos.	Nation	Player
FW	ENG	Billy Bairstow
FW	ENG	Billy Bridgewater
DF	ENG	L. Brownlow
FW	SCO	William Calder
MF	SCO	Gavin Crawford
GK	ENG	R. Creighton (guest player from Sheffield Club)
DF	ENG	Edward Cross
MF	ENG	Samuel Dobson
FW	SCO	John Drummond
GK	ENG	Richard Fenwick (guest player from Sheffield Club)
FW	ENG	William Getliff
MF	ENG	George Groves (captain)

Pos.	Nation	Player
DF	ENG	A. Hemmingfield
DF	SCO	Billy Hendry
DF	ENG	Rab Howell
GK	ENG	Charlie Howlett
DF	ENG	Jack Hudson
DF	ENG	Harry Lilley
DF	SCO	Harry Munro
DF	ENG	Ernest Needham
FW	SCO	W. Robertson
DF	ENG	Ned Stringer
FW	ENG	Arthur Watson
DF	ENG	Michael Whitham

=== Players leaving before end of the season ===
Note: Flags indicate national team as defined under FIFA eligibility rules; some limited exceptions apply. Players may hold more than one non-FIFA nationality.

Pos.	Nation	Player
FW	ENG	A.D. Barber (guest player from Sheffield Club)
FW	ENG	T.B.A. Clarke
FW	ENG	A.R. Elliman

Pos.	Nation	Player
DF	ENG	J. Jeeves (guest player from Sheffield Club)
FW	ENG	Bernard Shaw (guest player from Sheffield Club)
DF	ENG	Harry Thickett (guest player from Hexthorpe Wanderers)

== Transfers ==
=== In ===
Position	Player	Transferred from	Fee	Date	Source
FW	(England) Billy Bridgewater	Rotherham Town	Signed	August 1890	
DF	(England) Edward Cross	Rotherham Town	Signed	August 1890	
DF	(England) A. Hemmingfield	Doncaster Rovers	Signed	August 1890	
DF	(England) Harry Lilley	Staveley	Signed	August 1890	
FW	(Scotland) Gavin Crawford	Fairfield Rangers	Signed	November 1890	
DF	(Scotland) Harry Munro	Somerton Athletic	Signed	December 1890	
FW	(England) William Getliff	Darnall	Signed	January 1891	
MF	(Scotland) John Drummond	Preston North End	Signed	February 1891	
DF	(Scotland) Billy Hendry	Preston North End	Signed	February 1891	
DF	(England) Ernest Needham	Staveley	Signed	February 1891	
DF	(England) George Groves	Sheffield Club	Signed	March 1891	
MF	(England) Samuel Dobson	Preston North End	Signed	14 March 1891	

=== Out ===
Position	Player	Transferred to	Fee	Date	Source
FW	(Scotland) James Duncan	Released	Free	June 1890	
MF	(Scotland) Donald Fraser	Released	Free	June 1890	
FW	(Scotland) Dugald Galbraith	Released	Free	June 1890	
DF	(Scotland) L. Gilmartin	Released	Free	June 1890	
DF	(England) Walter Hobson	Owlerton	Free	June 1890	
DF	(England) S. Mack	Crewe Alexandra	Free	June 1890	
FW	(England) Billy Mosforth	Released	Retired	June 1890	
FW	(England) T.B.A. Clarke	Sheffield Club	Free	December 1890	

== League table ==
Pos	Team	Pld	W	D	L	GF	GA	GD	Pts
3	Lincoln City	18	7	6	5	34	21	+13	20
4	Derby Midland	18	8	4	6	28	28	0	20
5	Sheffield United	18	8	3	7	32	25	+7	19
6	Burton Wanderers	18	7	4	7	25	33	−8	18
7	Rotherham Town	18	7	4	7	20	28	−8	18

== Squad statistics ==
=== Appearances and goals ===
As of the end of the season

No.	Pos	Nat	Player	Total		Midland Counties League		FA Cup	
No.	Pos	Nat	Player	Apps	Goals	Apps	Goals	Apps	Goals
	FW	(England) ENG	Billy Bairstow	14	3	14	3	0	0
	FW	(England) ENG	Billy Bridgewater	22	9	18	9	4	0
	FW	(Scotland) SCO	William Calder	16	4	12	2	4	2
	MF	(Scotland) SCO	Gavin Crawford	5	4	5	4	0	0
	GK	(England) ENG	R. Creighton	1	0	1	0	0	0
	DF	(England) ENG	Edward Cross	21	0	16	0	5	0
	MF	(England) ENG	Samuel Dobson	5	1	5	1	0	0
	FW	(Scotland) SCO	John Drummond	5	1	5	1	0	0
	GK	(England) ENG	Richard Fenwick	1	0	1	0	0	0
	FW	(England) ENG	William Getliff	1	0	0	0	1	0
	MF	(England) ENG	George Groves	13	0	10	0	3	0
	DF	(Scotland) SCO	Billy Hendry	7	0	7	0	0	0
	DF	(England) ENG	Jack Houseley (Note: Jack Houseley was a former player in the Sheffield area who was acting as United's trainer. He played one Midland Counties League game as an emergency stand in because both Edward Cross and Harry Lilley had missed their train and were unable to play.)	1	0	1	0	0	0
	DF	(England) ENG	Rab Howell	23	2	18	2	5	0
	GK	(England) ENG	Charlie Howlett	24	0	19	0	5	0
	DF	(England) ENG	Jack Hudson	2	0	1	0	1	0
	DF	(England) ENG	Harry Lilley	20	0	15	0	5	0
	DF	(Scotland) SCO	Harry Munro	1	0	1	0	0	0
	FW	(Scotland) SCO	W. Robertson	20	5	16	3	4	2
	DF	(England) ENG	G. Smith (Note: There are no surviving records as to the identity of G. Smith or whether he was registered by United or a triallist. It is possible that he may be Thomas Smith who played for the Blades the following season.)	2	0	2	0	0	0
	DF	(England) ENG	Ned Stringer	5	0	5	0	0	0
	FW	(England) ENG	Arthur Watson	24	13	19	10	5	3
	DF	(England) ENG	Michael Whitham	26	0	21	0	5	0
Players who left before the end of the season:
	FW	(England) ENG	A.D. Barber	1	0	1	0	0	0
	FW	(England) ENG	T.B.A. Clarke	5	0	3	0	2	0
	DF	(England) ENG	J. Jeeves	3	0	2	0	1	0
	FW	(England) ENG	Bernard Shaw	16	2	11	0	5	2
	DF	(England) ENG	Harry Thickett	1	0	1	0	0	0

=== Top scorers ===
Place	Nation	Position	Name	Midland Counties League	FA Cup	Total
1	(England)	FW	Arthur Watson	10	3	13
2	(England)	FW	Billy Bridgewater	9	0	9
3	(Scotland)	FW	W. Robertson	3	2	5
4	(Scotland)	FW	William Calder	2	2	4
4	(Scotland)	MF	Gavin Crawford	4	0	4
5	(England)	FW	Billy Bairstow	3	0	3
6	(England)	DF	Rab Howell	2	0	2
6	(England)	FW	Bernard Shaw	2	0	2
7	(England)	MF	Samuel Dobson	1	0	1
7	(Scotland)	FW	John Drummond	1	0	1
Totals:				35	9	44

== Results ==
=== Key ===
Win Draw Loss Void

=== Midland Counties League ===
13 September 1890	Burton Wanderers	1–1	Sheffield United	Derby Turn
			Howell ( )	Attendance: 'Large'

20 September 1890	Sheffield United	3–0	Rotherham Town	Bramall Lane
	Unknown ( ) Bridgewater ( )			Attendance: 5,500

27 September 1890	Sheffield United	0–1	Long Eaton Rangers	Bramall Lane
				Attendance: 3,000

18 October 1890	Lincoln City	2–1	Sheffield United	John O'Gaunts
			Unknown ( )	Attendance: 2,000

27 October 1890	Sheffield United	1–1	Burslem Port Vale	Bramall Lane
	Robertson ( )		C.Davies	Attendance: 2,000

1 November 1890	Sheffield United	4–0	Kidderminster	Bramall Lane
	Robertson ( ) Watson ( ) Clader ( )			Attendance: 500

8 November 1890	Gainsborough Trinity	4–1	Sheffield United	The Northolme
			Robertson ( )	Attendance: 2,000

22 November 1890	Sheffield United	2–1	Lincoln City	Bramall Lane
	Bairstow ( ) Watson ( )			Attendance: 1,500

20 December 1890	Derby Midland	2–5	Sheffield United	?
			Calder ( ) Bridgewater ( ) Watson ( )	Attendance: 'Good'

25 December 1890	Sheffield United	2–0	Derby Junction	Bramall Lane
	Bridgewater ( ) Unknown ( )			Attendance: 5,700

27 December 1890	Kidderminster	0–2	Sheffield United	Chester Road
			Bridgewater ( ) Watson ( )	Attendance: 2,000

10 February 1891	Staveley	2–0	Sheffield United	?
				Attendance: 3,000

21 February 1891	Sheffield United	0–1	Derby Midland	Bramall Lane
				Attendance: 4,000

28 February 1891	Derby Junction	1–3	Sheffield United	Derby Arboretum
			Crawford ( ) Drummond ( )	Attendance: 2,000

7 March 1891	Sheffield United	2–1	Gainsborough Trinity	Bramall Lane
	Bairstow ( ) Crawford ( )			Attendance: 4,500

23 March 1891	Sheffield United	2–2	Burton Wanderers	Bramall Lane
	Howell ( ) Munro ( )			Attendance: 1,500

27 March 1891	Rotherham Town	0–1	Sheffield United	Clifton Lane
				Attendance: 4,500

28 March 1891 (Note: United played with 10 men after Edward Cross and Harry Lilley missed their train to the game.)	Long Eaton Rangers	2–3	Sheffield United	Long Eaton Stadium
			Watson ( ) Bridgewater ( )	Attendance: 2,000

4 April 1891	Sheffield United	5–0	Staveley	Bramall Lane
	Dobson ( ) ( ) Bridgewater ( ) Watson ( ) Crawford ( )			Attendance: 1,000

13 April 1891	Burslem Port Vale	3–1	Sheffield United	Athletic Ground
	C.Davies; Elson other		Watson ( )	Attendance: 2,000

=== FA Cup ===
4 October 1890 First qualifying round	Derby Junction	0–1	Sheffield United	Derby Arboretum
			Clarke ( )	Attendance: 2,000

25 October 1890 (Note: Although United lost the fixture Burton Swifts were disqualified for fielding an ineligible player meaning their place in the next round was handed to the Blades.) Second qualifying round	Burton Swifts	2–1	Sheffield United	Peel Croft
			Watson ( )	Attendance: 3,500

15 November 1890 Third qualifying round	Sheffield United	3–0	Matlock Town	Bramall Lane
	Unknown ( ) Shaw ( )			Attendance: 2,000

6 December 1890 (Note: Originally to be played in Loughborough but switched to Bramall Lane.) Fourth qualifying round 3	Sheffield United	6–1	Loughborough	Bramall Lane
	Robertson ( ) Watson ( ) Unknown ( ) Calder ( )			Attendance: 2,800

17 January 1891 Round 1	Sheffield United	1–9	Notts County	Bramall Lane
	Calder ( )			Attendance: 9,500

=== Sheffield Challenge Cup ===
11 January 1891 Round 1	Sheffield United	7–1	Attercliffe	Bramall Lane
	Bairstow ( ) Clarke ( ) Watson ( ) Shaw ( )			Attendance: 2,000

31 January 1891 Semi-final	Sheffield United	3–3	Kilnhurst	Bramall Lane
	Bairstow ( ) Robertson ( )			Attendance: 4,500

14 March 1891 (Note: United played two first team fixtures on the same day) Semi-final replay	Sheffield United	4–1	Kilnhurst	Bramall Lane
	Robertson ( ) Howell ( ) Watson ( )			Attendance: 3,500

21 March 1891; Final	Sheffield United	1–2	Doncaster Rovers	Bramall Lane
	Howell ( )			Attendance: 3,500

=== Wharncliffe Charity Cup ===
23 April 1891 Semi-final	The Wednesday	2–1	Sheffield United	Olive Grove
			Drummond ( )	Attendance: 3,250

=== Friendlies ===
1 September 1890	Sheffield United	9–0	Sheffield Club	Bramall Lane
	Bridgewater ( ) Clarke ( ) Watson ( ) Calder ( )			Attendance: 2,000

11 September 1890	Sheffield United	2–0	Incogniti	Bramall Lane
	Clarke ( ) Robertson ( )			Attendance: 850

22 September 1890	Sheffield United	0–3	Preston North End	Bramall Lane
				Attendance: 3,500

29 September 1890	Sheffield United	1–2	Nottingham Forest	Bramall Lane
	Watson ( )			Attendance: 2,500

6 October 1890	Sheffield United	1–2	Everton	Bramall Lane
	Robertson ( )			Attendance: 2,500

11 October 1890	Sheffield United	5–1	Birmingham St. George's	Bramall Lane
	Shaw ( ) ( ) Watson ( ) Bridgewater ( ) Robertson ( )			Attendance: 2,250

20 October 1890	Sheffield United	4–1	Derby County	Bramall Lane
	Robertson ( ) Bridgewater ( ) Shaw ( )			Attendance: 3,000

5 November 1890	Sheffield United	4–2	Ardwick	Bramall Lane
	Howell ( ) Robertson ( ) Watson ( ) Unknown ( )			Attendance: 3,500

17 November 1890	Sheffield United	2–1	Bolton Wanderers	Bramall Lane
	Watson ( ) Bridgewater ( )			Attendance: 2,500

8 December 1890	Sheffield United	3–2	Middlesbrough Ironopolis	Bramall Lane
	Watson ( ) Robertson ( )			Attendance: 1,500

15 December 1890	The Wednesday	2–1	Sheffield United	Olive Grove
			Robertson ( )	Attendance: 10,000

30 December 1890	Sheffield United	7–0	Casuals	Bramall Lane
	Bairstow ( ) Clarke ( ) Watson ( ) Shaw ( )			Attendance: 2,000

2 January 1890 (Note: Only 35 minutes played in each half due to failing light)	Sheffield United	2–1	(Scotland) Linthouse	Bramall Lane
	Calder ( ) Unknown ( )			Attendance: 1,250

3 January 1891	Darlington St. Augustine's	1–5	Sheffield United	?
			Bridgewater ( ) Own goal ( ) Robertson ( )	Attendance: 'few'

5 January 1891	Sheffield United	2–3	Corinthians	Bramall Lane
	Calder ( ) Watson ( )			Attendance: 3,500

12 January 1891	Sheffield United	3–2	The Wednesday	Bramall Lane
	Watson ( ) Howell ( ) Calder ( )			Attendance: 14,000

24 January 1891	Middlesbrough	2–1	Sheffield United	Linthorpe Road
			Watson ( )	Attendance: 1,500

26 January 1891	Sheffield United	0–1	Grimsby Town	Bramall Lane
				Attendance: 3,000

7 February 1891	Newcastle East End	4–0	Sheffield United	Stanley Street
				Attendance: 800

9 February 1891	Sheffield United	6–4	Heanor Town	Bramall Lane
	Bairstow ( ) Whitham ( ) Elliman ( )			Attendance: 1,000

14 February 1891	Derby County	3–2	Sheffield United	Racecourse Ground
			Drummond ( ) Bridgewater ( )	Attendance: 1,000

16 February 1891	Sheffield United	3–0	Rotherham Town	Bramall Lane
	Watson ( ) Crawford ( )			Attendance: 2,000

2 March 1891	Sheffield United	1–4	Nottingham Forest	Bramall Lane
	Robertson ( )			Attendance: 3,000

14 March 1891	Attercliffe	1–4	Sheffield United	Old Forge Ground
			Crawshaw ( ) Shaw ( ) Bridgewater ( ) ( )	Attendance: 'Large'

21 March 1891	Royal Arsenal	1–1	Sheffield United	Kennington Oval
			Getliffe ( )	Attendance: 3,800

30 March 1891	Sheffield United	3–1	Darlington St. Augustine's	Bramall Lane
	Getliff ( ) Watson ( )			Attendance: 'Not large'

1 April 1891	Middlesbrough Ironopolis	4–0	Sheffield United	Paradise Ground
				Attendance: 900

6 April 1891	Ardwick	4–1	Sheffield United	Hyde Road
			Watson ( )	Attendance: 2,300

11 April 1891	Sheffield United	2–2	Newcastle East End	Bramall Lane
	Crawford ( ) Bridgewater ( )			Attendance: 3,000

18 April 1891	Lincoln	0–1	Sheffield United	John O'Gaunts
			Crawford ( )	Attendance: 1,000

18 April 1891	Matlock	3–2	Sheffield United	Causeway Lane
			Cheffins ( ) Anon ( )	Attendance: 'Poor'

25 April 1891	Stockton	3–0	Sheffield United	?
				Attendance: 2,000

== Notes ==
Source:

== Bibliography ==
- Clarebrough and Kirkham (2008). Sheffield United Who's Who. Hallamshire Press. ISBN 978-1-874718-69-7.
