= 1891–92 Sheffield United F.C. season =

Sheffield United
1891–92 season
- Chairman: Michael Ellison
- Secretary: Joseph Wostinholm
- Northern League: 3rd
- FA Cup: Second Round (eliminated by Wolverhampton Wanderers)
- Sheffield Challenge Cup: Winners (beat Wednesday Wanderers)
- Wharncliffe Charity Cup: Winners (beat Attercliffe)
- Top goalscorer: League: Dobson (10); Hammond (10); All: Dobson (13)
- Highest home attendance: League: 7,750 (vs Stockton); Friendly: 22,900 (vs The Wednesday)
- Lowest home attendance: 2,000 (vs Sunderland Albion)
- Average home league attendance: 4,781
Home colours

The 1891–92 season was the third in existence for Sheffield United. This was their first season playing in the recently formed Northern League as the club sought to establish itself as a major footballing force. The Blades had a reasonably successful season, finishing third in the league, and registering some comprehensive victories along the way. They improved on the previous season by reaching the second round proper of the FA Cup and were victorious in the local cup competitions, winning both the Sheffield Challenge Cup and the Wharncliffe Charity Cup for the first time.

Under the stewardship of Joseph Wostinholm, United continued to recruit more experienced players. Bob Cain was signed from Bootle and Harry Hammond arrived from Everton, both players cementing their place in United's first team for several years to come. Most significant however was the emergence of a young Ernest Needham who made his United debut in the early part of the season and would go on to be one of the club's greatest ever players and ultimately captain England. The season did see the first United players to gain international caps with both Harry Lilley and Michael Whitham appearing for England on 5 March, (although in different matches as England played two different games concurrently on that day.)

== Background ==
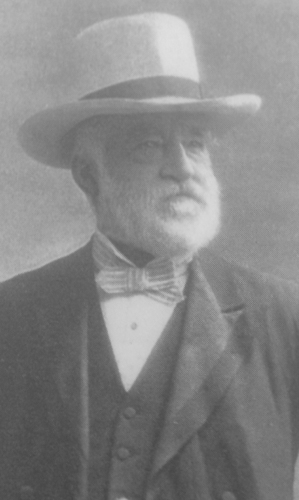
J.B. Wostinholm was the club secretary and responsible for football matters

Football was developing and match referees were introduced for the first time for the 1891–92 season. Previously both sides had provided an umpire who jointly officiated the game and consulted with a third official should they be unable to agree. Penalty kicks were also introduced to penalise fouls made within eighteen yards of the goal, and United used nets in the goals at Bramall Lane for the first time.

The previous season had been a mixed one, with an improvement in the quality of players and increasing attendances for home games, but a mid–table finish in the Midland Counties League had been the result. Under the guidance of club secretary J.B. Wostinholm, the football committee still wanted to improve the standard of matches played by United and so opted to leave the Midland Counties League and seek election to The Football League instead. They were unsuccessful in their attempt, amidst accusations that local rivals The Wednesday had voted against their acceptance and had even petitioned other clubs to vote against their entry. Instead United joined the newly formed Northern League which comprised mainly teams from the north–east, meaning that their nearest away match in the league was at Darlington, some 85 miles away from Sheffield.

Despite now being focussed on league football, the club also arranged a large number of friendly fixtures throughout the season which resulted in a congested fixture list and United playing 75 first team games in the space of eight months. This season also saw the introduction of an official reserve side for United, dubbed The Sheffield Strollers, who played a number of fixtures in addition to those played by the first team.

== Kit ==
United dropped the thin red vertical stripes that had been introduced the previous season, reverting to a plain white shirt along with blue shorts and socks. This season saw the introduction of a club crest (or badge) on the shirts for the first time, utilising a red heraldic shield emblazoned with three sheaves of wheat and a lions head, along with the letters SUFC.

== Season overview ==
=== Northern League ===
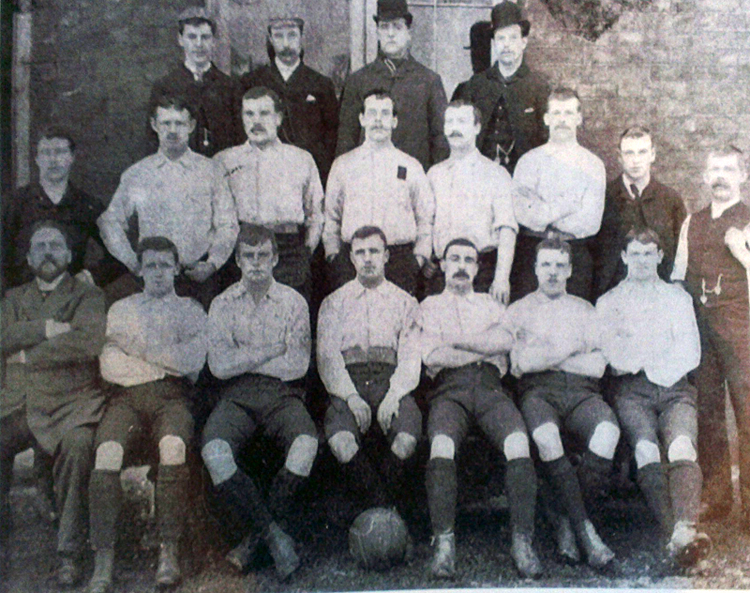
1891-92 Sheffield United F.C. first team. Pictured (left to right) – Rear: Fred Davies, Harry Stones (assistant secretary), John Scott, Will Lilley Middle: W. Patterson, Rab Howell, Bob Cain, Charlie Howlett, Billy Hendry, Harry Lilley, W. Nesbitt, Fred Housley (trainer) Front: Charles Stokes (football committee chairman), Sandy Wallace, Samuel Dobson, Harry Hammond, Arthur Watson, John Drummond, Michael Whitham

United continued with a sizable turnover of playing staff but were now focusing on using their financial position to target experienced professionals rather than relying on the untried talents of previous seasons. Bob Cain and Harry Hammond arrived in August, recruited from Bootle and Everton respectively, while previous stalwarts like Edward Cross, Billy Bridgewater and W. Robertson were allowed to leave. A young Ernest Needham was promoted to the first team and began to feature regularly as the season progressed; he would eventually go on to make over 450 league appearances for the Blades and to captain England during his career.

The league season started well as United registered a 4–2 away victory over Sunderland Albion followed by two comprehensive home wins; beating Darlington 7–1 and South Bank 6–0. It was not until early November that the Blades dropped points, suffering a 3–0 home defeat by Middlesbrough before a 2–0 reverse at the hands of struggling Darlington.

United continued to add to the squad, signing keeper Will Lilley from Staveley, before registering a string of victories until the end of the year, culminating in a 6–0 win over Stockton at the end of December. The league then took a winter break of almost three months, not resuming until almost the end of March. The club continued to strengthen their attacking options by recruiting three additional forwards from Scotland; Sandy Wallace, John Scott and resigning former player James Duncan. William Calder and Harry Munro were both allowed to join Gainsborough Trinity, before United resumed their league campaign with a 4–3 loss away at Newcastle West End who were struggling at the bottom of the table. This signalled a down–turn in form and inconsistent results until the end of the season meant that United lost touch with the top of the table and eventually finished third.

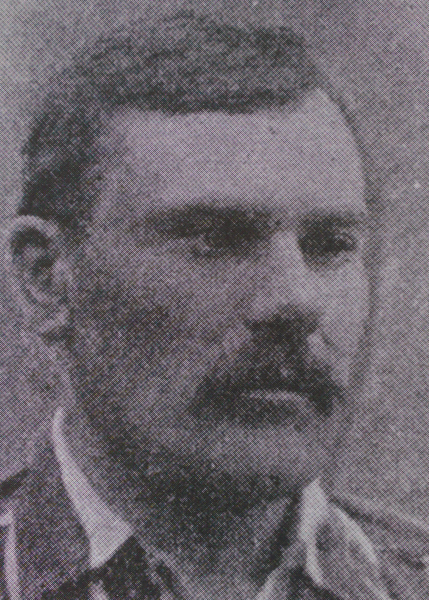
Bob Cain joined United from Bootle in August 1891

United's growing reputation was such that their players were beginning to come to the attention of the FA and both Michael Whitham and Harry Lilley received an England call–up in March 1892. Both players made their debut on 5 March, Whitham in a Home Championship game against Ireland in Belfast, and Lilley in a friendly against Wales. (Note: England played two games concurrently against different opposition, splitting the squad between the two.)

The club's organising football committee were still determined to gain entry to The Football League and applied for election for the second year in succession. On this occasion however United were successful and were given entry into the newly formed Second Division for the 1892–93 season. Cross–town rivals The Wednesday had also been accepted into the Football League, but had been placed in the First Division, much to the annoyance of United's board of directors. United asked to review the ballot papers upon which this decision had been based but were told that they had been destroyed, angering the club's directors still further.

=== FA Cup ===
As in previous years United had to play a number of qualifying rounds against local opposition before they gained entry to the FA Cup proper. Lincoln City were dispatched 4–1 at Bramall Lane, before much closer games against Grimsby and Gainsborough Trininty saw the Blades reach the first round proper. United travelled to Blackpool in the First Round, coming away comfortable 3–0 winners to secure a place in Round Two for only the second time. They met an experienced Wolverhampton Wanderers side at Molineux Stadium but were to progress no further, losing 3–1 to their Midlands opponents.

=== Local cups ===
As football in the area developed, so the standing of the local cups diminished amongst the area's leading sides. United entered the Sheffield Challenge Cup at the third round stage and comfortably saw off Doncaster Rovers 4–0 at Bramall Lane. The semi-final saw an away trip to Kilnhurst, who the Blades beat by the same 4–0 scoreline to secure a place in the final for the second year in succession. United faced local rivals The Wednesday at Bramall Lane, but the opposition had fielded their reserve side during the competition and as such a largely second–string United side beat the Wednesday Wanderers 2–1 to lift the club's first ever trophy.

The Wharncliffe Charity Cup garnered even less attention this season and United were given an automatic place in the final where they faced Attercliffe at the Olive Grove ground, beating them 2–0 at the end of March to win their second trophy in a month.

=== Friendlies ===
As in the previous two seasons, the football committee filled the fixture list by arranging a large number of friendlies and exhibition games throughout the year. The results of these games were mixed and mirrored the team's performance in the league; starting promisingly in the Autumn but tailing off after the turn of the year. United began the programme well, gaining victories against emerging Woolwich Arsenal, and the established Notts County and Bolton Wanderers, in the early part of the season. From October onwards the results became less consistent with the Blades suffering heavy defeats at the hands of Grimsby Town and Birmingham St. George's. It wasn't until February that United's form improved, beating Burnley and Everton twice in consecutive games, running out 5–0 victors over the Merseyside club at Bramall Lane. Another run of poor results followed until the Blades registered their most comprehensive victory of the season at the end of March, beating Burnley 8–1.

For the second season in succession the highlights of the fixture list were the games against local rivals The Wednesday, with a record 22,900 supporters attending Bramall Lane to see the Blades record a 5–0 victory at the end of October. Just under a month later United lost the return fixture at Olive Grove 4–1 in front of a more modest crowd of just under 12,000.

== Squad ==
=== First team ===
Rab Howell was a mainstay of the United defence throughout the season.

Note: Flags indicate national team as defined under FIFA eligibility rules; some limited exceptions apply. Players may hold more than one non-FIFA nationality.

Pos.	Nation	Player
FW	ENG	Billy Bairstow
DF	ENG	Edgar Benson (Note: Edgar C. Benson was a local left back who played for Sheffield Club but was also registered with The Football League by United between August 1892 and June 1895. During that time he only made five appearances for the Blades and his only competitive start came in a Northern League game against Sunderland Albion in 1892.) (guest from Sheffield FC)
FW	ENG	John Brookes (Note: John Arthur Brookes was an outside right registered by United in 1891 and stayed linked with the club until June 1895. During that period he made only three competitive appearances, his only league game being against South Bank in the Northern League.)
DF	SCO	Bob Cain
FW	ENG	Fred Davies
MF	ENG	Samuel Dobson
FW	SCO	John Drummond
FW	SCO	James Duncan
FW	ENG	William Getliff
MF	ENG	George Groves
FW	ENG	Harry Hammond
DF	SCO	Billy Hendry (captain)
DF	ENG	Walter Hill

Pos.	Nation	Player
DF	ENG	Rab Howell
GK	ENG	Charlie Howlett
DF	ENG	Harry Lilley
GK	ENG	Will Lilley
DF	ENG	Ernest Needham
DF	ENG	W. Nesbitt
MF	SCO	W. Patterson
FW	SCO	John Scott
FW	ENG	Thomas Smith
DF	ENG	Ned Stringer
FW	ENG	Sandy Wallace
FW	ENG	Arthur Watson
DF	ENG	Michael Whitham

=== Players leaving before the end of the season ===
Note: Flags indicate national team as defined under FIFA eligibility rules; some limited exceptions apply. Players may hold more than one non-FIFA nationality.

Pos.	Nation	Player
FW	SCO	William Calder
GK	ENG	Richard Fenwick (guest player from Sheffield Club)

Pos.	Nation	Player
DF	SCO	Harry Munro
FW	WAL	John Thomas

== Transfers ==
=== In ===
Position	Player	Transferred from	Fee	Date	Source
FW	(Wales) John Thomas	Gainsborough Trinity	Signed	5 May 1891	
FW	(England) John Brooks	Unknown	Signed	August 1891	
DF	(Scotland) Bob Cain	Bootle	Signed	August 1891	
FW	(England) Fred Davies	Ardwick	Signed	August 1891	
FW	(England) Harry Hammond	Everton	Signed	August 1891	
DF	(England) Walter Hill	Grimethorpe	Signed	August 1891	
DF	(England) W. Nesbitt	Unknown	Signed	August 1891	
GK	(England) Will Lilley	Staveley	Signed	November 1891	
FW	(England) Thomas Smith	Unknown	Signed	November 1891	
FW	(Scotland) James Duncan	Unknown	Signed	December 1891	
DF	(Scotland) W. Patterson	Unknown	Signed	December 1891	
FW	(Scotland) John Scott	Leith Athletic	Signed	December 1891	
FW	(England) Sandy Wallace	Abercorn	Signed	December 1891	

=== Out ===
Position	Player	Transferred to	Fee	Date	Source
DF	(England) Edward Cross	Northwich Victoria	Free	May 1891	
FW	(England) Billy Bridgewater	Doncaster Rovers	Free	June 1891	
DF	(England) L.Brownlow	Gainsborough Trinity	Free	June 1891	
FW	(Scotland) Gavin Crawford	Woolwich Arsenal	Free	June 1891	
DF	(England) A. Hemmingfield	Released	Free	June 1891	
DF	(England) Jack Hudson	The Wednesday	Free	June 1891	
FW	(Scotland) W. Robertson	Gainsborough Trinity	Free	June 1891	
FW	(Wales) John Thomas	Gainsborough Trinity	Free	October 1891	
FW	(Scotland) William Calder	Gainsborough Trinity	Free	January 1892	
DF	(Scotland) Harry Munro	Gainsborough Trinity	Free	March 1892	

== League table ==
Northern League
Pos	Team	Pld	W	D	L	GF	GA	GD	Pts
1	Middlesbrough Ironopolis	16	14	1	1	49	13	+36	29
2	Middlesbrough	16	13	0	3	33	13	+20	26
3	Sheffield United	16	10	2	4	49	21	+28	22
4	Newcastle East End	16	9	2	5	37	20	+17	20
5	Stockton	16	6	2	8	31	34	−3	14

== Squad statistics ==
=== Appearances and goals ===
As of the end of the season

No.	Pos	Nat	Player	Total		Northern League		FA Cup	
No.	Pos	Nat	Player	Apps	Goals	Apps	Goals	Apps	Goals
	FW	(England) ENG	Billy Bairstow	0	0	0	0	0	0
	DF	(England) ENG	Edgar Benson	1	0	1	0	0	0
	FW	(England) ENG	John Brookes	1	0	1	0	0	0
	DF	(Scotland) SCO	Bob Cain	19	0	14	0	5	0
	FW	(Scotland) SCO	Fred Davies	1	0	1	0	0	0
	MF	(England) ENG	Samuel Dobson	20	13	15	10	5	3
	FW	(Scotland) SCO	John Drummond	19	8	15	8	4	0
	FW	(Scotland) SCO	James Duncan	2	1	2	1	0	0
	FW	(England) ENG	William Getliff	0	0	0	0	0	0
	MF	(England) ENG	George Groves	1	0	1	0	0	0
	FW	(England) ENG	Harry Hammond	21	11	16	10	5	1
	DF	(Scotland) SCO	Billy Hendry	20	0	15	0	5	0
	DF	(England) ENG	Walter Hill	1	0	1	0	0	0
	DF	(England) ENG	Rab Howell	17	0	12	0	5	0
	GK	(England) ENG	Charlie Howlett	11	0	8	0	3	0
	DF	(England) ENG	Harry Lilley	15	0	10	0	5	0
	GK	(England) ENG	Will Lilley	10	0	8	0	2	0
	DF	(England) ENG	Ernest Needham	16	4	13	3	3	1
	DF	(England) ENG	W. Nesbitt	7	0	5	0	2	0
	FW	(Scotland) SCO	W. Patterson	3	0	3	0	0	0
	FW	(Scotland) SCO	John Scott	11	3	9	2	2	1
	FW	(England) ENG	Thomas Smith	0	0	0	0	0	0
	DF	(England) ENG	Ned Stringer	0	0	0	0	0	0
	FW	(England) ENG	Sandy Wallace	8	4	6	2	2	2
	FW	(England) ENG	Arthur Watson	12	7	9	6	3	1
	DF	(England) ENG	Michael Whitham	12	0	9	0	3	0
Players who left before the end of the season:
	FW	(Scotland) SCO	William Calder	2	0	1	0	1	0
	GK	(England) ENG	Richard Fenwick	0	0	0	0	0	0
	DF	(Scotland) SCO	Harry Munro	0	0	0	0	0	0
	FW	(Wales) WAL	John Thomas	1	1	1	1	0	0

== Results ==
=== Key ===
Win Draw Loss

=== Northern League ===
12 September 1891 (Note: This game saw the first ever penalty kick awarded against United. The referee awarded the goal during the game, completing the match at 3–4, but afterwards decided that the infringement had not taken place within the penalty area and so rescinded the goal retrospectively. Some newspaper reports carried the 3–4 scoreline.)	Sunderland Albion	2–4	Sheffield United	Blue House Field, Sunderland
			Thomas ' Watson ', ' Drummond '	Attendance: 3,000

26 September 1891	Sheffield United	7–1	Darlington	Bramall Lane, Sheffield
	Watson ', ' Dobson ', ' Hammond ' Needham ' McGregor ' (o.g.)			Attendance: 7,500

10 October 1891 (Note: This was the first game at Bramall Lane to use goal nets.)	Sheffield United	6–0	South Bank	Bramall Lane, Sheffield
	Hammond ' Drummond ', ' Dobson ', ' Needham '			Attendance: 2,500

17 October 1891	Middlesbrough	1–2	Sheffield United	Linthorpe Road, Middlesbrough
			Drummond ' Hammond '	Attendance: 4,000

7 November 1891	Sheffield United	0–3	Middlesbrough	Bramall Lane, Sheffield
				Attendance: 6,000

21 November 1891	Darlington	2–0	Sheffield United	Feethams, Darlington
				Attendance: 2,000

28 November 1891	South Bank	0–5	Sheffield United	Normanby Road, Middlesbrough
			Dobson ', ' Hammond ', ' Anderson ' (o.g.)	Attendance: 500

19 December 1891	Sheffield United	5–1	Newcastle West End	Bramall Lane, Sheffield
	Scott ' Drummond ' Needham ' Dobson ', '			Attendance: 3,000

26 December 1891	Newcastle East End	1–2	Sheffield United	Stanley Street, Newcastle upon Tyne
			Drummond ' Wallace '	Attendance: 3,500

29 December 1891	Sheffield United	6–0	Stockton	Bramall Lane, Sheffield
	Unknown ' Hammond ', ' Dobson ', ', '			Attendance: 7,750

26 March 1892	Newcastle West End	4–3	Sheffield United	St James' Park, Newcastle upon Tyne
			Scott ' Watson ', '	Attendance: 1,000

2 April 1892	Sheffield United	2–2	Middlesbrough Ironopolis	Bramall Lane, Sheffield
	Hammond ' Drummond '			Attendance: 6,500

11 April 1892	Sheffield United	2–1	Sunderland Albion	Bramall Lane, Sheffield
	Wallace ' Hammond '			Attendance: 2,000

16 April 1892	Sheffield United	3–0	Newcastle East End	Bramall Lane, Sheffield
	Duncan ' Hammond ' Dobson '			Attendance: 3,000

18 April 1892	Stockton	1–1	Sheffield United	?, Stockton-on-Tees
			Hammond '	Attendance: 2,700

30 April 1892	Middlesbrough Ironopolis	2–1	Sheffield United	Paradise Ground, Middlesbrough
			Drummond '	Attendance: 3,000

=== FA Cup ===
24 October 1891 Second qualifying round	Sheffield United	4–1	Lincoln City	Bramall Lane, Sheffield
	Needham ' Watson ' Hammond ' Neill ' (o.g.)			Attendance: 10,000

14 November 1891 Third qualifying round	Grimsby Town	1–2	Sheffield United	Abbey Park, Grimsby
			Hammond ' Dobson '	Attendance: 4,500

5 December 1891 Fourth qualifying round (Note: United had been drawn as the away side for this fixture but it was switched to Bramall Lane.)	Sheffield United	1–0	Gainsborough Trinity	Bramall Lane, Sheffield
	Dobson '			Attendance: 7,000

16 January 1892 First Round	Blackpool	0–3	Sheffield United	Raikes Hall, Blackpool
			Scott ' Wallace ', '	Attendance: 2,800

30 January 1892 Second Round	Wolverhampton Wanderers	3–1	Sheffield United	Molineux Stadium, Wolverhampton
			Dobson '	Attendance: 5,000

=== Sheffield Challenge Cup ===
23 January 1892 Third Round	Sheffield United	4–0	Doncaster Rovers	Bramall Lane, Sheffield
	Dobson ', ' Watson ' Scott '			Attendance: 2,500

27 February 1892 (Note: The Kilnhurst side left the pitch in protest on 61 minutes, unhappy with the referee. The game was not re-started and the win was awarded to United.) Semi Final	Kilnhurst	0–4 (Abdn. 61)	Sheffield United	?, Carbrook
			Billy Bairstow ' Scott ', ' Smith '	Attendance: 600

12 March 1892 (Note: The Wednesday entered their reserve team (Wednesday Wanderers) in the competition. United had entered their first team but the player selected for the final were largely a second string side.) Final	Sheffield United	2–1	Wednesday Wanderers	Bramall Lane, Sheffield
	Scott ', '			Attendance: 5,000

=== Wharncliffe Charity Cup ===
31 March 1892 First round	Sheffield United	2–0	Attercliffe	Olive Grove, Sheffield
	Billy Bairstow ' Dobson '			Attendance: 2,000

=== Friendlies ===
1 September 1891	Sheffield United	5–1	Middlesbrough Ironopolis	Bramall Lane, Sheffield
	Langley ' (o.g.); Watson ', ' Thomas ' Drummond '			Attendance: 3,000

3 September 1891	Millwall Athletic	0–2	Sheffield United	The Athletic Ground, London
			Hammond ' Drummond '	Attendance: 1,500

5 September 1891	Woolwich Arsenal	0–2	Sheffield United	Invicta Ground, London
			Watson ' Drummond '	Attendance: 11,000

7 September 1891	Sheffield United	4–1	Notts County	Bramall Lane, Sheffield
	Dobson ' Thomas ' Hammond ', '			Attendance: 4,000

15 September 1891	Bootle	1–3	Sheffield United	Hawthorne Road, Bootle
			Watson ', ' Dobson '	Attendance: 2,000

19 September 1891	Middlesbrough Ironopolis	2–2	Sheffield United	Paradise Ground, Middlesbrough
			Hammond ' Drummond '	Attendance: 3,000

21 September 1891	Sheffield United	4–3	Bolton Wanderers	Bramall Lane, Sheffield
	Hammond ', ' Watson ', '			Attendance: 3,500

28 September 1891	Sheffield United	1–2	Preston North End	Bramall Lane, Sheffield
	Watson '			Attendance: 8,700

3 October 1891	Burton Swifts	0–2	Sheffield United	Peel Croft, Burton upon Trent
			Unknown ' Watson '	Attendance: 'good'

12 October 1891	Sheffield United	3–0	Grimsby Town	Bramall Lane, Sheffield
	Watson ', ' Hammond '			Attendance: 6,000

19 October 1891	Sheffield United	4–2	Canadians	Bramall Lane, Sheffield
	Dobson ', ' Whitham ' Watson '			Attendance: 3,000

26 October 1891	Sheffield United	5–0	The Wednesday	Bramall Lane, Sheffield
	Brandon ' (o.g.); Hammond ', ' Dobson ', '			Attendance: 22,900

29 October 1891	Grimsby Town	5–1	Sheffield United	Abbey Park, Grimsby
			Watson '	Attendance: 3,000

31 October 1891	Casuals	3–0	Sheffield United	Kennington Park Oval, London
				Attendance: 2,000

2 November 1891	Sheffield United	4–1	Derby County	Bramall Lane, Sheffield
	Drummond ' Dobson ', ' Hammond '			Attendance: 3,500

5 November 1891	Sheffield United	1–3	Bootle	Bramall Lane, Sheffield
	Bairstow '			Attendance: 2,000

16 November 1891	The Wednesday	4–1	Sheffield United	Olive Grove, Sheffield
			Needham '	Attendance: 11,500

23 November 1891	Sheffield United	3–2	Newton Heath	Bramall Lane, Sheffield
	Hammond ', ' Watson '			Attendance: 3,000

12 December 1891	Walsall Town Swifts	2–0	Sheffield United	?, Walsall
				Attendance: 550

25 December 1891 (Note: Match abandoned on 75 minutes due to fog.)	Sheffield United	3–0 (abdn. 75 min)	Woolwich Arsenal	Bramall Lane, Sheffield
	Scott ' Hammond ' Howell '			Attendance: 2,000

30 December 1891	Sheffield United	7–2	Casuals	Bramall Lane, Sheffield
	Hendry ' Dobson ', ' Hammond ' Scott ', ', '			Attendance: 2,500

1 January 1892	Sheffield United	4–3	Rotherham Town	Bramall Lane, Sheffield
	Duncan ' Davies ' Needham ', '			Attendance: 2,500

2 January 1892	Bolton Wanderers	3–3	Sheffield United	Pikes Lane, Bolton
			Dobson ' Watson ', '	Attendance: 900

4 January 1892	Sheffield United	3–0	Burton Swifts	Bramall Lane, Sheffield
	Hammond ', ' Watson '			Attendance: 5,250

9 January 1892	Birmingham St Georges	8–2	Sheffield United	?, Birmingham
			Davies ' Wallace '	Attendance: 200

1 February 1892	Sheffield United	2–4	Aston Villa	Bramall Lane, Sheffield
	Dobson ' Drummond '			Attendance: 3,500

4 February 1892	Woolwich Arsenal	1–4	Sheffield United	Invicta Ground, London
			Rankin ' (o.g.); Watson ' Scott ' Wallace '	Attendance: 3,000

6 February 1892	Chatham	1–0	Sheffield United	Maidstone Road Ground, Chatham
				Attendance: 3,250

8 February 1892	Sheffield United	3–1	Staveley	Bramall Lane, Sheffield
	Scott ' Hendry ' Watson '			Attendance: 2,500

13 February 1892	Sheffield United	0–0	Notts County	Bramall Lane, Sheffield
				Attendance: 5,500

15 February 1892	Sheffield United	2–2	Sunderland	Bramall Lane, Sheffield
	Hammond ' Dobson '			Attendance: 2,000

20 February 1892	Sheffield United	0–1	Preston North End	Bramall Lane, Sheffield
				Attendance: 4,700

22 February 1892	Burnley	0–1	Sheffield United	Turf Moor, Burnley
			Jeffrey ' (o.g.)	Attendance: 'fair'

27 February 1892	Everton	0–2	Sheffield United	Anfield, Liverpool
			Watson ', '	Attendance: 7,000

29 February 1892	Sheffield United	5–0	Everton	Bramall Lane, Sheffield
	Scott ', ' Watson ' Davies ' Needham '			Attendance: 4,000

5 March 1892	Gainsborough Trinity	0–1	Sheffield United	The Northolme, Gainsborough
			Davies '	Attendance: 2,000

7 March 1892	Sheffield United	3–1	Walsall Town Swifts	Bramall Lane, Sheffield
	Whitham ' Watson ' Scott '			Attendance: 3,000

12 March 1892	Derby County	3–2	Sheffield United	Racecourse Ground, Derby
			Watson ' Dobson '	Attendance: 3,000

14 March 1892	Chesterfield	4–3	Sheffield United	Saltergate, Chesterfield
			Watson ' Scott ' Bairstow '	Attendance: 2,000

17 March 1892	Notts County	2–0	Sheffield United	Trent Bridge, Nottingham
				Attendance: 2,500

18 March 1892	Sheffield United	2–2	Lincoln City	Bramall Lane, Sheffield
	Dobson ' Scott '			Attendance: 5,000

21 March 1892	Rotherham Town	3–0	Sheffield United	Clifton Lane, Rotherham
				Attendance: 3,500

28 March 1892	Sheffield United	8–1	Burnley	Bramall Lane, Sheffield
	Scott ', ', ', ', ' Wallace ' Watson ', '			Attendance: 1,000

4 April 1892 (Note: Only 40 minutes were played in each half.)	Newton Heath	2–1	Sheffield United	North Road, Manchester
			Hammond '	Attendance: 3,000

9 April 1892	Sheffield United	3–1	Accrington	Bramall Lane, Sheffield
	Unknown ' Dobson ' Wallace '			Attendance: 1,000

15 April 1892	Sheffield United	3–0	Millwall	Bramall Lane, Sheffield
	Dobson ' Scott ', '			Attendance: 3,500

19 April 1892	Sheffield United	3–0	West Bromwich Albion	Bramall Lane, Sheffield
	Dobson ' Scott ' Needham '			Attendance: 7,500

21 April 1892	Sheffield United	1–3	Casuals	Bramall Lane, Sheffield
	Hammond '			Attendance: 800

24 April 1892	Lincoln City	2–2	Sheffield United	John O'Gaunts, Lincoln
			Dobson ' Wallace '	Attendance: 1,100

== Notes ==
Source:

== Bibliography ==
- Clarebrough and Kirkham (2008). Sheffield United Who's Who. Hallamshire Press. ISBN 978-1-874718-69-7.
- Clarebrough and Kirkham (1999). A Complete Record of Sheffield United Football Club 1889–1999. Hallamshire Press. ISBN 0-9508588-2-X.
