= Spoors =

Spoors is a surname. Notable people with the surname include:

- Jack Spoors (1886–1963), English rugby union player
- Jacobus Spoors (1751–1833), Dutch politician
- Jimmy Spoors (1880s–1960), English footballer and manager
- Lucy Spoors (born 1990), New Zealand rower
- Matthew Spoors (born 1999), Canadian cricketer
- Phoebe Spoors (born 1993), New Zealand rower

== See also ==
- Spoor (surname)
- Spoor (disambiguation)
