= Spoor =

Spoor may refer to:

== Animals ==
- Spoor (animal), anything that shows signs of an animal

== People ==
- Spoor (surname), people with the surname Spoor

== Entertainment ==
- Spoor (album), a 1994 compilation album by Thin White Rope
- Spoor (comics), a Marvel Comics character
- Spoor (film), a 2017 Polish film

== Places ==
- Spoor, Michigan, a ghost town

== See also ==
- Spoors (surname)
- Spoo (disambiguation)
- Poors (disambiguation)
- Spur
- SPQR
