= 1920 in Wales =

- Centuries: 18th; 19th; 20th; 21st
- Decades: 1900s; 1910s; 1920s; 1930s; 1940s
- See also: List of years in Wales; Timeline of Welsh history 1920 in The United Kingdom Scotland Elsewhere

This article is about the particular significance of the year 1920 to Wales and its people.

== Incumbents ==
- Archdruid of the National Eisteddfod of Wales – Dyfed
- Lord Lieutenant of Anglesey – Sir Richard Henry Williams-Bulkeley, 12th Baronet
- Lord Lieutenant of Brecknockshire – Joseph Bailey, 2nd Baron Glanusk
- Lord Lieutenant of Caernarvonshire – John Ernest Greaves
- Lord Lieutenant of Cardiganshire – Herbert Davies-Evans
- Lord Lieutenant of Carmarthenshire – John Hinds
- Lord Lieutenant of Denbighshire – Lloyd Tyrell-Kenyon, 4th Baron Kenyon
- Lord Lieutenant of Flintshire – Henry Gladstone, later Baron Gladstone
- Lord Lieutenant of Glamorgan – Robert Windsor-Clive, 1st Earl of Plymouth
- Lord Lieutenant of Merionethshire – Sir Osmond Williams, 1st Baronet
- Lord Lieutenant of Monmouthshire – Ivor Herbert, 1st Baron Treowen
- Lord Lieutenant of Montgomeryshire – Sir Herbert Williams-Wynn, 7th Baronet
- Lord Lieutenant of Pembrokeshire – John Philipps, 1st Viscount St Davids
- Lord Lieutenant of Radnorshire – Arthur Walsh, 3rd Baron Ormathwaite
- Archbishop of Wales – Alfred George Edwards, Bishop of St Asaph (elected 7 April 1920)

== Events ==
- 22 January - Grant of the royal charter founding the University of Wales, Swansea.
- 31 March - The Welsh Church Act 1914 and Welsh Church (Temporalities) Act 1919 come into force, resulting in the creation of the Church in Wales after disestablishment, and appointment of the first Archbishop of Wales. The new Diocese of Monmouth is created.
- September - Report of the departmental committee on the organisation of secondary education in Wales, chaired by William Napier Bruce.
- 9 November - In a notorious murder trial at Carmarthen, solicitor Harold Greenwood is found not guilty of poisoning his wife.
- 3 December - Five crew members from the Rhoscolyn lifeboat are lost off Llanddwyn, Anglesey.
- 21 December - 1920 Rhondda West by-election: William John retains the seat for Labour after the resignation of William Abraham.
- Mortimer Wheeler becomes Director of the National Museum of Wales.
- More people are employed in the coal industry in Wales in this year than ever before or since.
- Opening of the Queen's Dock at Swansea Docks.
- Explorer Edgeworth David and civil servant George Lewis Barstow are knighted.
- Hugh Evan-Thomas becomes an admiral.
- Sale of the Downing Hall estate at Whitford, the former home of Thomas Pennant.

== Arts and literature ==
- January - Y Winllan is launched, with Edward Tegla Davies as editor.
- Ifan ab Owen Edwards becomes editor of the children’s paper, Cymru’r Plant, originally launched by his father Owen Morgan Edwards.
- Controversy arises when T. H. Parry-Williams is appointed to the new Chair of Welsh Language at the University of Wales, because of his history of pacifism.
- Margaret Haig Thomas launches the periodical Time and Tide.

=== Awards ===
- National Eisteddfod of Wales (held in Barry)
- National Eisteddfod of Wales: Chair - withheld
- National Eisteddfod of Wales: Crown - James Evans

=== New books ===
- Caradoc Evans - My Neighbours
- John Jenkins (Gwili) - Poems
- Thomas Mardy Rees - Difyrwch Gwyr Morgannwg
- Thomas Frederick Tout - The Captivity and Death of Edward of Caernarvon

=== Music ===
- Evan Thomas Davies becomes the first director of music at University of Wales, Bangor.
- Margaret Hughes sings at the Aeolian Hall under her stage name of "Leila Megane".

== Film ==
- Ivor Novello appears in Miarka: The Daughter of the Bear

== Broadcasting ==
- 22 March - A full duplex commercial service begins operating from the Towyn radio receiving station, and C. S. Franklin develops an improved anti-interference antenna design.

== Sport ==
- Rugby Union
  - 17 January - In a 19-5 win over England, Jerry Shea achieves the first international scoring "Full House"; try, penalty goal, conversion and drop goal. A feat not repeated until 1950.
  - 17 February - Wales beat France 6–5 at the Stade Colombes in Paris

== Births ==
- 16 January – Walley Barnes, footballer (d. 1975)
- 23 February – Ron Berry, writer (d. 1997)
- 25 March – Arthur Lever, international footballer (d. 2004)
- 12 April – The Cox Twins, music hall entertainers (d. (Frank) 2007 and (Fred) 2013)
- 5 May – Sir Glanmor Williams, historian (d. 2006)
- 7 May – Tommy Davies, middleweight boxer (d. 1998)
- 13 May – Gareth Morris, flautist, brother of Jan Morris (d. 2007)
- 12 July – Howell Witt, bishop in Australia (d. 1998)
- 6 September – Trevor Morris, football player and manager (d. 2003)
- 7 September – Harri Webb, poet (d. 1994)
- 24 September – Gweneth Lilly, writer and teacher (d. 2004)
- 8 October – Frank Herbert, science fiction novelist of Welsh ancestry (d. 1986)
- 31 October – Dick Francis, jockey and crime novelist (d. 2010)
- 10 November – Peter Philp, antiques expert and dramatist (d. 2006)
- 11 November – Roy Jenkins, politician (d. 2003)
- 20 November – Len Blyth, Wales international rugby player (d. 1995)
- 2 December – George Edwards, international footballer (d. 2008)
- 23 December – Tommy Best, footballer (d. 2018)
- 18 December – Merlyn Rees, politician (d. 2006)

== Deaths ==
- 11 January – Pryce Pryce-Jones, entrepreneur, 85
- 16 January – Evan Rowland Jones, politician, 79
- 21 February – Anna Thomas (Morfudd Eryri), poet and campaigner for the Eisteddfod, 81
- March – John Thomas, footballer, age unknown
- 11 March – Daniel James (Gwyrosydd), poet, 73
- 14 March – Owen Owen, educationist, 69/70
- 5 May – Robert Bryan, poet and composer, 61
- 15 May – Owen Morgan Edwards, historian and educationist, 61
- 5 June – Rhoda Broughton, novelist, 79
- 7 June – Hugh Ellis-Nanney, politician, 75
- 9 August – Samuel Walker Griffith, prime minister of Queensland, 75
- 1 September – Frederick Rutherfoord Harris, politician, 64
- 30 November – John Meredith, Wales national rugby player, 57

== See also ==
- 1920 in Ireland
