= Edward Cross =

Edward Cross may refer to:

- Edward Cross (footballer) (fl. 1890s), English footballer
- Edward Cross (politician) (1798–1887), American judge, surveyor and politician
- Edward Cross (zoo proprietor) (1774–1854), English zoo proprietor and dealer in animals
- Edward E. Cross (1832–1863), newspaperman and Union Army general during the American Civil War
- Edward Makin Cross (1880–1965), bishop of Spokane in the Episcopal Church
