= W. Patterson =

Scottish footballer

Personal information
- Place of birth: Edinburgh, Scotland
- Position: Defender

Senior career*
Years	Team	Apps	(Gls)
1891–1892	Sheffield United	4	(0)
1893–1894	Gainsborough Trinity		
- * Club domestic league appearances and goals

W. H. Patterson (date of birth unknown) was a Scottish footballer who played in The Football League for Sheffield United between 1891 and 1892. Primarily a defender he also filled in on various positions during his time at Bramall Lane.

Patterson (or Pattison as he was referred to on occasions) was simply described as being "from Edinburgh" by the local press on his signing by United in December 1891. He featured only irregularly in the first team and played just a handful of competitive games. By 1892 and with United now in The Football League more first team chances looked beyond him and it was announced he had left the club by December of that year. He went on to play for Gainsborough Trinity.

== Career statistics ==
Appearances and goals by club, season and competition
Club	Season	League			FA Cup		Other		Total	
Club	Season	Division	Apps	Goals	Apps	Goals	Apps	Goals	Apps	Goals
Sheffield United	1891–92	Northern League	3	0	0	0	2 (Note: One appearance in Sheffield Challenge Cup; one appearance in Wharncliffe Charity Cup)	0	5	0
Sheffield United	1892–93	Division Two	1	0	0	0	0	0	1	0
Career total			4	0	0	0	2	0	6	0
