= W. Nesbitt =

English footballer

Personal information
- Place of birth: England
- Position(s): Defender

Senior career*
| Years | Team | Apps | (Gls) |
| 1891–1891 | Sheffield United | 5 | (0) |
- *Club domestic league appearances and goals

W. Nesbitt, occasionally referred to as Nisbitt in some reports, was a footballer who played for Sheffield United as a defender during the 1891–92 season. Little else is known about him, with no surviving contemporary records or documents as to his full identity. Nesbitt was registered by United in the summer of 1891 and played in 29 games during the course of the season, although the majority of them were friendly fixtures. He did make five competitive starts in the Northern League and a further two in the FA Cup before being released the following summer.
