= John Thomas (Welsh footballer) =

Welsh footballer

Personal information
- Full name: John William Thomas
- Place of birth: Wales
- Date of death: March 1920 (aged 54)
- Place of death: Gainsborough, England
- Position: Outside right

Senior career*
Years	Team	Apps	(Gls)
1889–1890	Gainsborough Trinity		
1891	Sheffield United	1	(1)
1891–1893	Gainsborough Trinity		
- * Club domestic league appearances and goals

John William Thomas (date of birth unknown) was a Welsh footballer who played as an outside right for Sheffield United and Gainsborough Trinity.

== Football career ==
The Welshman (as he was referred to in the local press) was signed by Sheffield United on 5 May 1891 from Gainsborough Trinity. Gainsborough had just won the Midland Counties League and Thomas was signed to bring added potency to United's attack. Thomas started the first seven of United's games in the 1891–92 season including scoring in their first ever game in the Northern League against Sunderland Albion. Despite this he then lost his place to a young Ernest Needham and, unable to reclaim his position in the side, Thomas returned to Gainsborough Trinity in December 1891.
