= Tom Hay =

Late 19th-early 20th century English footballer

Thomas Hay (July 1858 – 10 January 1940) was an English goalkeeper born in Staveley, Derbyshire. He played in the Football League for Accrington and Burton Swifts, and also played for Staveley, Bolton Wanderers, Great Lever, Halliwell, Burslem and Newton Heath LYR.
