= John Scott (footballer, born 1872) =

Scottish footballer

Jack Scott
Personal information
- Date of birth: 1 January 1872
- Place of birth: Edinburgh, Scotland
- Height: 5 ft 10 in (1.78 m)
- Position: Forward

Youth career
- Cameron Highlanders

Senior career*
Years	Team	Apps	(Gls)
- Leith Athletic
1891–1892	Sheffield United	17	(5)
1892–1900	Gainsborough Trinity	92	(20)
- * Club domestic league appearances and goals

John C. Scott (born 1 January 1872, date of death unknown) was a Scottish footballer who played as a forward. Born in Edinburgh he played for Leith Athletic in his native Scotland before spells with Sheffield United and Gainsborough Trinity in England.

== Career ==
Scott played for Cameron Highlanders as a youth, before coming to prominence with local club Leith Athletic. It was here that he was spotted by English side Sheffield United who signed him in December 1891 to play in the Northern League. Scott scored on his league debut in a 5–1 victory over Newcastle West End a few days later and would go on to also score on his debut in both the FA Cup (during a 3–0 victory over Blackpool a month later) and on his Football League debut (in a 2–0 victory over Small Heath in September 1892). Described by United trainer George Waller (regarded as an excellent judge of players) during a contemporary interview as "one of the best", Scott played regularly until his was surprisingly transferred in December 1892, a year after his arrival.

Spending almost eight years at Gainsborough Trinity, Scott became a mainstay of their side, making 92 appearances in The Football League and scoring 20 goals for the Lincolnshire club. He played little during his final season with Trinity and it was reported that as a reservist he had been called up to fight in South Africa in the Second Boer War.
