= Walkley F.C. =

- Full name: Walkley Football Club
- Founded: 1870
- Dissolved: 1890
- Ground: Old Grindstone
- Secretary (1889–90): George Willey
Home colours

Walkley Football Club was an association football club from Sheffield, Yorkshire.

== History ==
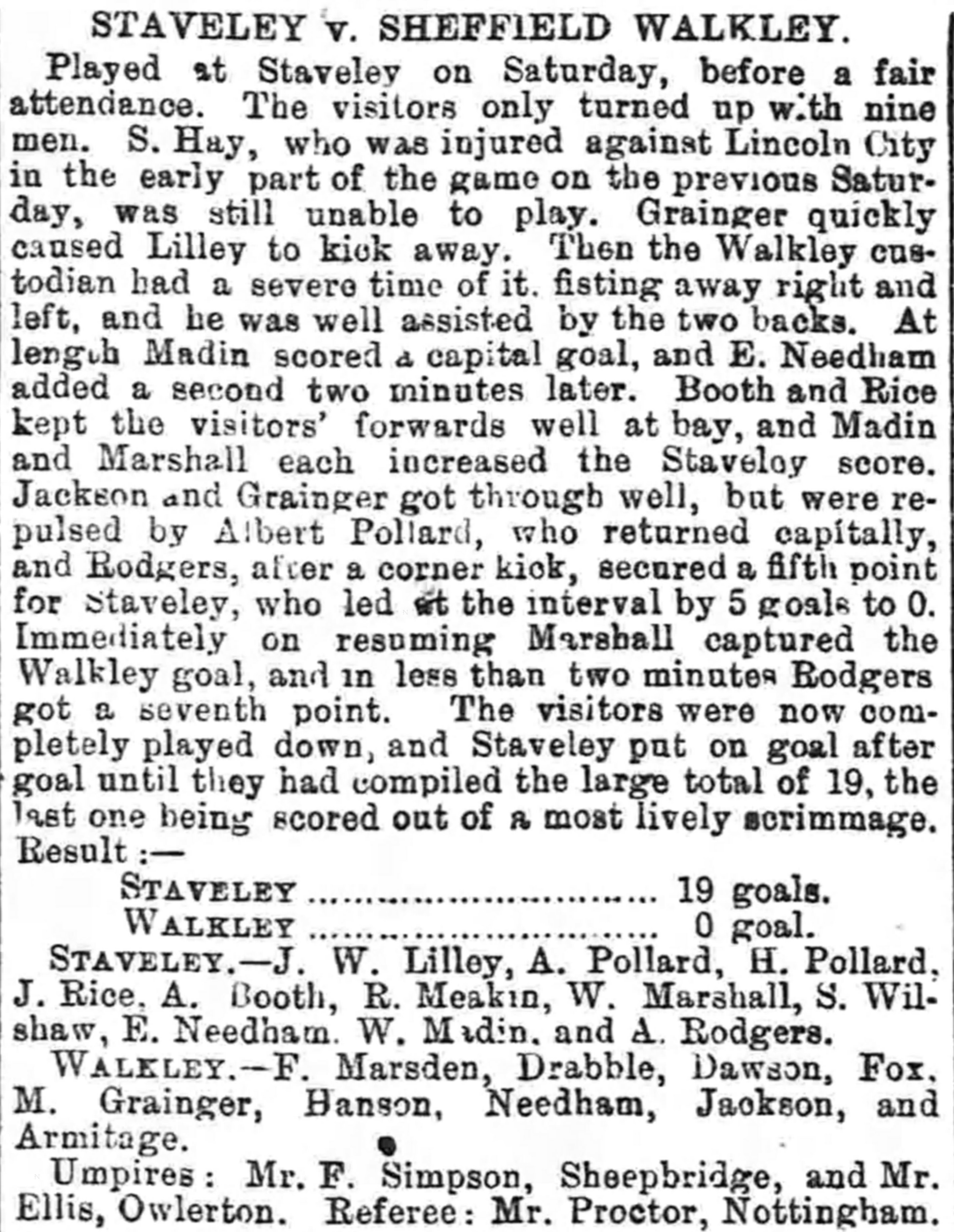
Walkley's 19–0 defeat at Staveley in the 1890–91 FA Cup qualifying, Sheffield Independent, 6 October 1890

The club was formed in 1870, originally playing under the Sheffield rules. The club's record in its first season was an equable 5 wins, 6 draws, and 5 defeats.

Walkley was an entrant to the first Sheffield Association Cup in 1876–77; it lost in the first round at Kimberworth by 2 goals to 0, with Kimberworth goalkeeper Taylor not having a save to make.

Although the club was a consistent competitor in the 1870s and 1880s, at one point being severely critical of the Sheffield Football Association for not notifying it of a replay in the Sheffield Senior Cup in 1884, it was consistently unsuccessful, never making the final stages of the local competitions, other than losing to Carbrook Church in the 1887–88 Sheffield & Hallamshire Minor Cup final at Bramall Lane, the tie going to a replay after Carbrook equalized in the original match at Sheaf House with the last kick of the game.

The club took a step up in 1889–90, by becoming a founder member of the Sheffield & District Football League and entering the FA Cup for the first time. In the 1889–90 FA Cup qualifying rounds, it lost 2–0 at Sheffield F.C. at the first time of asking, both Sheffield goals coming in extra-time after a Walkley second-half goal was chalked off for offside, and finished mid-table in the League. There were however already signs of difficulties - the club's home first round Sheffield Association Cup tie with Heeley only attracted 150 spectators, and the visitors won 8–0 after Walkley went down to 10 men at half-time through injury.

However, although the club re-entered the Sheffield & District League for 1890–91, the club very quickly fell apart. It lost its ground, thus having to play all matches away from home; it then failed to turn up for its first League match at Kilnhurst, blaming a missed train. For the tie at Staveley in the first of the 1890–91 FA Cup qualifying rounds, Walkley only turned up with 9 players, and was demolished 19–0, with 4 further home goals disallowed. The club recovered enough to lose to the same side by a mere 4–0 in the League the following week, with a different goalkeeper and full-backs playing, but that was the club's last recorded game - the last action of the club was scratching to the Eckington Works side in the Sheffield Association Cup later in October. Ironically the League shield had been donated by the League secretary, George Willey, who was also the Walkley secretary.

== Colours ==
The club's colours were scarlet and white.

== Ground ==
The club originally played at Hillsborough. In 1877, it moved to a new ground at Penistone Road, and in 1888 to a new, enclosed, ground behind the Old Grindstone Inn at Crookes.

== Notable players ==
- Ernest "Nudger" Needham, future England international, who played in the club's final season, including the 19–0 defeat at Staveley
