= Jimmy Spoors =

English footballer and manager

Personal information
- Full name: James Spoors
- Date of birth: 1887 or 1888
- Place of birth: Gingling Gate, Jarrow, England
- Date of death: 1960
- Position: Defender

Senior career*
Years	Team	Apps	(Gls)
1908–1916	Sheffield Wednesday	235	(5)
1916	→ Rotherham County (loan)		
1916–1920	Sheffield Wednesday	18	(1)
1920–1922	Barnsley	23	(10)
1922–	Worksop Town		
- * Club domestic league appearances and goals

James Spoors (1880s–1960) was an English professional footballer and manager, who played for Sheffield Wednesday, Barnsley, and Rotherham County, as well as Worksop Town.

== Sheffield Wednesday ==
Spoors joined Sheffield Wednesday in 1908 and played there for twelve years, with a brief period on loan to Rotherham County in 1916, helping them to defeat Sheffield United for the second time that season.

== First World War ==
After initially working in a munitions factory Spoors served with the 4th Depot, 302nd Battery Royal Garrison Artillery in France and Italy during the First World War, he was a qualified mechanic. He also represented the army at football when in service.

== Barnsley ==
In June 1920 Spoors moved to Barnsley, overcoming a serious knee injury which appeared to have curtailed his playing career, at Sheffield Wednesday. Spoors played primarily at Barnsley as a defender but was unorthodoxly occasionally played as a centre forward, in an experimental capacity by the club, with quite prolific results. Alongside his duties as a player Spoors managed the reserve team, in the Midland League.

== Post-retirement ==
After retiring from football, Spoors became a talented bowls player, winning the Brewers Bowl in 1933. Spoors was also a licensed victualler and associate member of the Sheffield, Rotherham and District Licensed Victuallers Association, running the Old Blue Ball on Bradfield Road, Hillsborough.

== Family ==
Parish records show that on 14 May 1914 Spoors married Winifred, the daughter of former England and Sheffield Wednesday footballer Jack Hudson. They gave their address as the Castle Inn, Dykes Hall Road, Hillsborough, the public house run by Hudson. Military records show that they had a daughter, Annie Margaret.
