= Paradise Ground =

Former football ground in Middlesbrough, England

- Interactive map of Paradise Ground
- Location: Middlesbrough, England
- Coordinates: 54.5641°N 1.2456°W
- Surface: Grass
- Record attendance: 14,000

Construction
- Opened: 1889

Tenant
- Middlesbrough Ironopolis

The Paradise Ground was a football ground in Middlesbrough in England. It was the home ground of Middlesbrough Ironopolis.

== History ==
The Paradise Ground was initially a field behind Oldgate Farm to the south-west of Middlesbrough town centre. When Middlesbrough Ironopolis began using the ground in 1889, there were no spectator facilities. However, later developments included small covered stands being built on three sides of the pitch and some uncovered seating. However, players and officials had to change at the County Hotel, which was far enough away to require transport to be provided to reach the ground.

The ground's record attendance of 14,000 was set on 18 February 1893 for an FA Cup match against Preston North End. Later in the year Ironopolis were elected to the Second Division of the Football League, and the first Football League game was played at the Paradise Ground on 2 September 1893, with Ironopolis losing 2–0 to Liverpool in front of 2,000 spectators. However, attendances began to drop rapidly, with only around 200 watching the 25 November match against Small Heath, well below the official lowest Football League attendance of 469 set by Thames in 1930. Ironopolis resigned from the league at the end of the season and subsequently folded. The last Football League game at the ground was played on 3 March 1894, with Ironopolis beating Northwich Victoria 2–1 in front of 2,000 spectators.

The north-west corner of the site was used to build Middlesbrough F.C.'s Ayresome Park ground in the early 1900s, whilst the rest of the site was used for housing.
