= J. Jeeves =

English footballer

Personal information
- Position: Defender

Senior career*
Years	Team	Apps	(Gls)
- Sheffield Club
1890–1891	→ Sheffield United (guest)	2	(0)
- * Club domestic league appearances and goals

J. Jeeves was an English footballer who played as a defender for Sheffield United.

== Playing career ==
Jeeves was an amateur player registered with Sheffield Club when he began appearing as a guest player for Sheffield United towards the end of their first season in existence. Although primarily appearing in friendly fixtures Jeeves did play for The Blades in both the FA Cup and the Midland Counties League.
