= Jack Hudson (English footballer) =

English footballer

Personal information
- Full name: John Hudson
- Date of birth: 11 October 1860
- Place of birth: Sheffield, England
- Date of death: 21 November 1941 (aged 81)
- Place of death: Worksop, England
- Position: Half back

Senior career*
Years	Team	Apps	(Gls)
1878–1884	Heeley		
1879–1880	Providence		
1880	Owlerton		
1880–1883	Sheffield		
1880–1885	The Wednesday	0	(0)
1882	Walkley		
1886	Blackburn Olympic		
1889–1891	Sheffield United	1	(0)

International career
1883	England	1	(0)
- * Club domestic league appearances and goals

John Hudson (11 October 1860 – 21 November 1941) was an English footballer who played as a half back. Born in Sheffield, Hudson played for hometown clubs Sheffield, The Wednesday and Sheffield United; he also represented England at international level.

== Career ==
=== Club career ===
Hudson played most of his club football in the Sheffield area, starting out with Heeley before joining Sheffield. As a semi-professional Hudson played for a number of different teams in this period, as allowed by FA rules.

He joined The Wednesday in 1880, making his debut that December. While at Wednesday, Hudson made 16 appearances in the FA Cup, before the advent of the Football League. During his time with Wednesday, Hudson was briefly club secretary and a committee man. He left The Wednesday in 1885 after taking a benefit match and then spent a short time with Blackburn Olympic.

Hudson answered the advertisement from new club Sheffield United asking for players for their inaugural season and was one of the first individuals signed by the club. He played in the club's very first match in September 1889, a friendly against Nottingham Rangers and served as team captain during that first season, in which he was virtually ever present. The following year however he was plagued by injuries and made only six appearances, eventually retiring to take up a position of trainer at The Wednesday.

=== International career ===
He also earned one international cap for England in February 1883. In his solitary international appearance, he was appointed captain and led his country to a 7–0 victory over Ireland.

== Personal life ==
In the 1881 census, Hudson was described as a "German Silver Caster", and was living with his mother at School Lane, Sheffield. Following his retirement from playing Hudson became the licensee of the Castle Inn in Sheffield, and married Annie Mellor in September 1888. Hudson was the father in law of Sheffield Wednesday footballer Jimmy Spoors.
