= Bernard Shaw (footballer, born before 1900) =

English footballer

Personal information
- Place of birth: England
- Position: Forward

Youth career
- Hallam

Senior career*
Years	Team	Apps	(Gls)
- Sheffield Club
- → The Wednesday (guest)
1890–1891	→ Sheffield United (guest)	11	(0)
1891–1893	→ Woolwich Arsenal (guest)		
- * Club domestic league appearances and goals

Bernard L. Shaw was an English footballer who played for Sheffield United as a forward. Born 'locally' Shaw was an amateur player who guested for both The Wednesday and Sheffield United on occasions as allowed by FA rules at the time. Although more often used in friendly fixtures he did represent United in both the FA Cup and the Midland Counties League.

Work took Shaw to London in 1891 after which he made occasional guest appearances for Woolwich Arsenal over the following two seasons.
