= Spoo =

Spoo may refer to:

- Bob Spoo (1937–2018), American college football coach
- Caspar Mathias Spoo (1837–1914), Luxembourgish industrialist and politician
- Robert Spoo (born 1957), American legal scholar and educator
- Spoo (food), a fictional food in the Babylon 5 science fiction television series

== See also ==
- Spoo Ness, a land feature in Unst Island, Shetland Islands - see North Sea#Extent
