= Will Lilley =

English footballer

Personal information
- Full name: William James Lilley
- Date of birth: 1885
- Place of birth: Staveley, England
- Position: Goalkeeper

Youth career
- 1887: Staveley Lowgates

Senior career*
Years	Team	Apps	(Gls)
1887–1890	Staveley		
1890–1894	Sheffield United	25	(3)
1894–1895	Rotherham Town	9	(0)
Medal record
Sheffield United
Runner-up	Second Division	1893
- * Club domestic league appearances and goals

William James Lilley (born 1885, date of death unknown) was a footballer who played as a goalkeeper for both Sheffield United and Rotherham Town in The Football League.

== Career ==
Born in Staveley in Derbyshire, England he began his career alongside his older brother Harry with local side Staveley Lowgates in 1887 and would go on to follow his sibling from club-to-club until 1894. The pair moved to the town's senior side Staveley with whom Will played for three years, appearing in the Midland Counties League for the club.

Harry left for Sheffield United in the summer of 1890 but Will remained at Staveley for a further season. He was eventually transferred in November 1891 and had been intending to join The Wednesday who had offered him a contract, but influenced by his brother he instead opted to join him at their cross-city rivals Sheffield United when the opportunity arose.

Lilley competed with established keeper Charlie Howlett for a starting position in the first team but more often than not lost out to his rival. Despite this he remained with United for two and a half seasons and had the distinction of being in goal for their first ever game in The Football League against Lincoln City in September 1892.

Both Lilley and his older brother Harry played their final first team game for United in April 1894 with Will having played in 25 league and three FA Cup games for the club, and remarkably for a keeper having scored three goals. Older brother Harry opted to retire from football at that point but Will played on for another season, transferring to Rotherham Town for whom he played nine times in The Football League.

== Honours ==
Sheffield United

- Football League Division Two
  - Runner-up: 1892–93
