= Ned Stringer =

English footballer

Personal information
- Position: Fullback

Senior career*
Years	Team	Apps	(Gls)
- Ecclesfield
- Lockwood Brothers
1889–1892	Sheffield United	5	(0)
- * Club domestic league appearances and goals

E 'Ned' Stringer was an English footballer who played for Sheffield United from 1889 to 1892 as a fullback.

Stringer was a well known player in the local area when he signed for Sheffield United at the start of their inaugural season. He had played regularly for both Ecclesfield and Lockwood Brothers before he arrived at Bramall Lane having responded to the advert asking for players that the club had placed in the local press.

Virtually ever-present in that first season, he appeared in the club's debut FA Cup campaign although the majority of the other fixtures were friendly matches. He remained at United for the following two seasons. although with the club now playing League football he was used mainly in reserve games.

After his playing contract was terminated at the end of the 1891–92 season he retained connections with the club, undertaking scouting duties and acting as a match official in some fixtures.
