= Harry Lilley =

English footballer (1868–1900)

Personal information
- Full name: Henry Edward Lilley
- Date of birth: 1868
- Place of birth: Staveley, England
- Date of death: 30 August 1900 (aged 31–32)
- Place of death: Worksop, England
- Position: Left back

Youth career
- 1887: Staveley Lowgates

Senior career*
Years	Team	Apps	(Gls)
1887–1890	Staveley		
1890–1894	Sheffield United	52	(0)

International career
1892	England	1	(0)
Medal record
Sheffield United
Runner-up	Second Division	1893
- * Club domestic league appearances and goals

Henry Edward Lilley (1868 – 30 August 1900) was an English international footballer. Born in Staveley, he played his league football as a left back for Sheffield United.

== Career ==
=== Club career ===
Lilley started his career playing for his home-town club of Staveley before he was signed by Sheffield United in the summer of 1890. He played regularly for the Blades for two seasons but once they were elected to the Football League his appearances became less frequent. He remained with the club for another two seasons although became prone to knee injuries and was released in 1894. Shortly after his death in 1900 a writer in the Sheffield Daily Telegraph issue of 28 September 1900 commented on him being a "very fine and scrupulously fair back."

=== International career ===
Along with fellow United player Michael Whitham, Lilley was selected for an international trial in February 1892 and made his one and only appearance for England the following month against Wales.

== Personal life ==
He was not well during the last few months of his life, losing sight in one eye because of an accident at Christmastime 1899, and suffering from consumption, and effects of an abdominal injury suffered late in his playing career. Lilley was the brother of goalkeeper and fellow Sheffield United player Will Lilley.

== Honours ==
Sheffield United

- Football League Division Two
  - Runner-up: 1892–93
