= Spoor (surname) =

Spoor is a surname. Notable people with the surname include:

- Ben Spoor (1878–1928), British politician
- George Kirke Spoor (1871–1953), American film producer and executive
- Leslie Spoor (1910–2011), Scottish politician and activist
- Nathan Spoor, American artist and writer
- Newcomb Spoor (1852–1935), American politician
- Rudolf Spoor (1938–2024), Dutch television director
- Ryk E. Spoor, American author
- Simon Spoor (1902–1949), Dutch military officer
- Winanda Spoor (born 1991), Dutch cyclist

== See also ==
- Spoors
