= Gavin Crawford (footballer) =

Scottish footballer

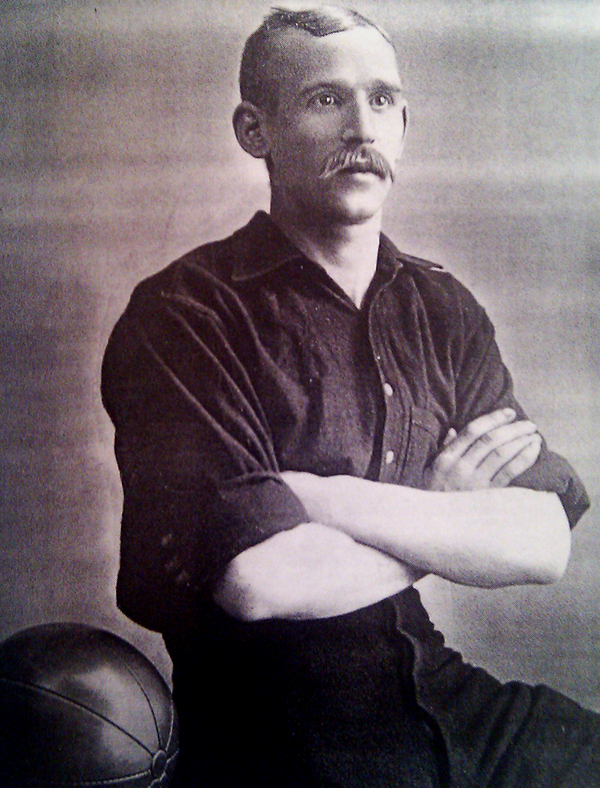
- Contemporary portrait of Gavin Crawford

Personal information
- Date of birth: 24 January 1869
- Place of birth: Galston, Scotland
- Date of death: 2 March 1955 (aged 86)
- Place of death: Plumstead, London, England
- Height: 5 ft 9 in (1.75 m)
- Position: Midfielder

Youth career
- Ash Lea

Senior career*
Years	Team	Apps	(Gls)
1887–1890	Fairfield Rangers		
1890–1891	Sheffield United	5	(4)
1891–1898	Woolwich Arsenal	122	(14)
1898–1899	Millwall		
1899–1900	Queens Park Rangers	24	(1)
- * Club domestic league appearances and goals

Gavin Crawford (24 January 1869 – 2 March 1955) was a Scottish footballer who played as a winger or midfielder. Crawford had spells at clubs Woolwich Arsenal, Sheffield United, Millwall and Queens Park Rangers.

== Playing career ==
Crawford started playing for Glasgow side Fairfield Rangers, with whom he won the Scottish Junior Cup. Onward he moved to join in 1890 Sheffield United of the Midland Counties League. He stayed at Bramall Lane for just over half of a season, playing in eight competitive fixtures altogether.

After leaving the Blades, Crawford moved to London to join Woolwich Arsenal, becoming the first professional player for the side. Crawford at first played for Arsenal in the role of a right-winger only to alter his position to be a midfielder. He at once became a regular as the club joined the Football League in 1893. Crawford scored on his League debut for Arsenal in a Second Division match against Walsall Town Swifts on 11 September 1893.

He was continually present for Arsenal, becoming club captain after the death of Joe Powell in 1896. However, injury wrecked his 1897–98 season, and he lost his regular place within the side. All in all, he played 211 times for Woolwich Arsenal in pre-league, league and cup games, scoring 18 goals altogether.

Crawford was one of the longest-surviving members of Arsenal's first professional side, along with Bill Julian and Jack McBean. The three stalwarts were reunited at an Arsenal game against Chelsea on 20 March 1948.

After leaving the Manor Ground Crawford moved on to Millwall in 1898. He later had a stint with Queens Park Rangers where together with Adam Haywood, Alex McConnell and William White he formed a quartet of ex Gunners. After retiring from football, he became head groundsman at Charlton Athletic, a role that he held until 1947.
