= Charlie Howlett =

English footballer

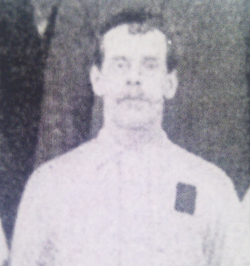
- Charlie Howlett from a squad photo circa 1891

Personal information
- Date of birth: September 1864
- Place of birth: Glanford, England
- Date of death: 17 August 1906 (aged 41)
- Place of death: Gainsborough, England
- Height: 5 ft 8 in (1.73 m)
- Position: Goalkeeper

Youth career
- Gainsborough Victoria

Senior career*
Years	Team	Apps	(Gls)
- Gainsborough Trinity
1889–1894	Sheffield United	71	(0)
1894–1903	Gainsborough Trinity		
Medal record
Sheffield United
Runner-up	Second Division	1893
- * Club domestic league appearances and goals

Charles Howlett (September 1864 – 17 August 1906) was an English footballer who played for Sheffield United as a goalkeeper in The Football League, with whom he made over 100 competitive appearances. Born in Glanford he also had two spells at Gainsborough Trinity.

== Playing career ==
Howlett started his career in Gainsborough, Lincolnshire but was living in Grenoside near Sheffield when Sheffield United placed adverts in the local press announcing the formation of the club and asking for players. Responding to the appeal he was selected as the side's first goalkeeper and remained with the club for five seasons. He appeared in the club's first ever game against Notts Rangers and in their debut FA Cup campaign which saw both the team's biggest ever victory and heaviest ever defeat in the competition, a 13–0 defeat at the hands of Bolton Wanderers.

Howlett had poor eyesight and needed to wear glasses during games and as a consequence tried to avoid being charged by opposition players, often punching away shots instead of catching them, including shots along the ground. During the FA Cup game against Bolton it was reported that he had spent most of the game searching for his glasses in the muddy goalmouth.

Despite this Howlett remained first choice keeper for the club's first three seasons but shared goalkeeping duties with Will Lilley for the following two. Following his departure from Bramall Lane Howlett returned to his previous club Gainsborough Trinity where he played for another nine seasons before retiring.

== Honours ==
Sheffield United

- Football League Division Two
  - Runner-up: 1892–93

== Personal life ==
After retiring from playing Howlett settled in Birmingham before returning to live in Gainsborough following the death of his wife.
