= Joseph Wostinholm =

Football club secretary

J.B. Wostinholm
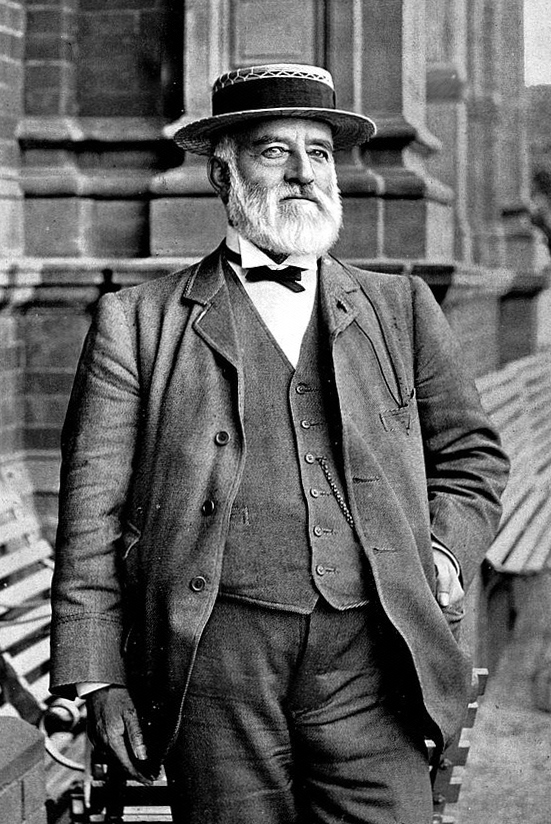
- Wostinholm c. 1895
- Born: Joseph Beckett Wostinholm; 1836; Sheffield, England
- Died: April 1909 (aged 72–73); Sheffield, England
- Other names: John Wostinholm
- Occupations: Yorkshire County Cricket Club secretary from 1864 to 1902; Club Secretary at Sheffield United from 1889 to 1899

Joseph Beckett Wostinholm (1836 – April 1909) was the club secretary of Sheffield United from its formation in 1889 until 1899. Sometimes referred to as 'John' or 'J.B.' Wostinholm, he was also secretary of the Yorkshire County Cricket Club from 1864 until 1902.

Wostinholm was a charted accountant, stockbroker and estate agent who worked out of offices on Bramall Lane in Sheffield. He took the position of secretary of the Bramall Lane Cricket Ground in 1862 and was responsible for the ground's development into a top class cricket venue. He also became secretary of the recently formed Yorkshire County Cricket Club and worked to establish Yorkshire as the leading county.

In 1889 he was instrumental in the formation of a new football team to play at the Bramall Lane ground during the winter months and became the club secretary of Sheffield United at their inception. Although the team was selected by a committee and coached by a trainer, Wostinholm undertook many of the duties currently associated with that of a football manager including player transfers and dealing with The Football Association.

Retiring from Bramall Lane in 1899 and Yorkshire in 1902 Wostinholm died in 1909 at the age of 73.

== See also ==
- List of English football championship winning managers
