= Billy Bridgewater =

English footballer

Personal information
- Full name: William Bridgewater
- Date of birth: 14 September 1886
- Place of birth: Parkgate, Rotherham, England
- Date of death: 21 March 1941 (aged 54)
- Place of death: Doncaster, England
- Positions: Inside right; centre forward

Youth career
- 1885–1886: Rawmarsh United

Senior career*
Years	Team	Apps	(Gls)
1886–1887	Doncaster Rovers		
1887–1888	Newton Heath		
1887–1888	→ Oldham Olympic Athletic (guest)		
1887–1888	→ Gainsborough Trinity (guest)		
1888–1889	Doncaster Rovers		
1888–1889	→ Hexthorpe Wanderers (guest)		
1889–1890	Rotherham Town		
1890–1891	Sheffield United	18	(9)
1891–1893	Doncaster Rovers		(7)
1893–1894	Hexthorpe Wanderers		
- * Club domestic league appearances and goals

William Bridgewater was an English footballer who played as a forward. Born in Parkgate, Rotherham he began his career with a short spell at Doncaster Rovers before moving across the Pennines to play for Newton Heath. Still an amateur whilst in Manchester he also appeared for Oldham Olympic and Gainsborough Trinity as a guest player during this period (as was allowed under FA rules) before returning to Doncaster Rovers.

Bridgewater was signed on professional terms by Rotherham Town in 1889 but was transferred to nearby Sheffield United in September 1890. Scoring a hat-trick in his debut game, he would go on to play in the Midland Counties League and the FA Cup for the Yorkshire club. After one season at Bramall Lane he returned to Doncaster Rovers in the summer of 1891 before finishing his playing career at Hexthorpe, although he retained his links with United, acting as a scout for several years after his departure. Bridgewater was also a professional boxer but injuries brought about his retirement from both boxing and football. He subsequently opened a gym in Doncaster where he became a boxing and wrestling promoter, managing two British boxing champions.
