= William Calder (footballer) =

Scottish footballer

Personal information
- Date of birth: 1868
- Place of birth: Edinburgh, Scotland
- Date of death: 24 May 1936 (aged 67)
- Place of death: Doncaster, England
- Positions: Outside left; outside right

Senior career*
Years	Team	Apps	(Gls)
1889–1891	Sheffield United	13	(2)
1892–1893	Gainsborough Trinity		
1893–?	Barnsley St. Peter's		
1893–1897	Doncaster Rovers		(5)

Managerial career
- 1920: Doncaster Rovers
- * Club domestic league appearances and goals

William Calder (1868 – 24 May 1936) was a Scottish footballer who played as a forward for Sheffield United, Gainsborough Trinity, Barnsley St. Peter's and Doncaster Rovers.

== Playing career ==
Born in Edinburgh, Calder was the first new player to sign for Sheffield United after the initial formation of the club. He was signed in December 1889 after responding to the club's advertisements for players which had been published in Scotland. He played seven games for the Blades in the FA Cup and a handful of times in the Midland Counties League and the Northern League before being released in December 1891.

Calder then signed for Gainsborough Trinity in 1892 and also had a spell with Barnsley St. Peter's. He moved to play for Doncaster Rovers in 1893, remaining at the club till some time in the 1896−97 season when they won the Midland League, however he only played 3 times that season and didn't receive a medal.

== Management career ==
Following his retirement from the game as a player, he settled in the town and in June 1920, as Rovers reformed following the war period, Calder offered them his services as "Honorary Manager", creating a team from the applications that had come in. This was the first time the term manager had been applied to a Rovers official.

Calder died suddenly at his Doncaster home in 1937, aged 67.
