= Harry Munro (footballer) =

Scottish footballer

Personal information
- Place of birth: Scotland
- Position: Defender

Senior career*
Years	Team	Apps	(Gls)
- Somerton Athletic
1890–1892	Sheffield United	1	(1)
1892–1899	Gainsborough Trinity	89	(2)
1899–1900	South Shields Adelaide		
- * Club domestic league appearances and goals

Harry Munro was a Scottish footballer who played for Sheffield United and Gainsborough Trinity as a defender . Born in Scotland, Munro had been playing for Somerton Athletic when he was recruited by Sheffield United in December 1890. His appearances were mainly limited to the large number of friendlies that the club still played at that time but he did also represent the club in the FA Cup and the Midland Counties League

Munro was released after just over a year at United and moved to Gainsborough Trinity where he enjoyed much more success, captaining the side and making 89 appearances in the English Football League for the Lincolnshire club.
