= Billy Bairstow =

English footballer

Personal information
- Full name: William Bairstow
- Place of birth: Sheffield, England
- Place of death: Barnsley, England
- Positions: Inside right; inside left

Senior career*
Years	Team	Apps	(Gls)
- Engineer Wanderers
1889–1890	Sheffield Club		
1890–1892	Sheffield United	14	(3)
1892–1893	Penistone		
1893–1895	Barnsley St. Peter's		
- * Club domestic league appearances and goals

William Bairstow was an English footballer who played for Sheffield United and Barnsley St. Peter's as an inside right or inside left. Born in Sheffield Bairstow had been playing for Sheffield Club when he was signed by newly formed Sheffield United in March 1890. He spent just over two years at Bramall Lane but as the team became more successful his appearances were limited to the large number of friendlies that the club still played at that time.

Bairstow was eventually released and played for local side Penistone before joining Barnsley St. Peter's for whom he was a regular and made his FA Cup debut. He was later reported to have died in Barnsley of typhoid.

There appears to have been some confusion over Bairstow's family name as in early match reports the local press would often use a variety of spellings including Bairstoe, Bairsto, Baisto, Bastoe and Bastow.
