= Ernest Needham =

English footballer and cricketer

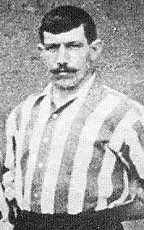

Personal information
- Date of birth: 21 January 1873
- Place of birth: Whittington Moor, Chesterfield, England
- Date of death: 8 March 1936 (aged 63)
- Place of death: Chesterfield, England
- Position: Left half

Youth career
- Walkley
- Staveley Wanderers

Senior career*
Years	Team	Apps	(Gls)
1889–1891	Staveley		
1891–1909	Sheffield United	477	(55)

International career
1894–1902	England	16	(3)
- * Club domestic league appearances and goals

Ernest Needham (21 January 1873 – 8 March 1936) was an English footballer and cricketer. He played in sixteen international football matches for England and captained the side in 1901.

He was an outstanding left half who played for Sheffield United from 1891 until 1910. He was instrumental in their promotion campaign of 1892–93 and then captained their team from 1895 to 1905. Under his captaincy, United won the Football League First Division in 1898 and the FA Cup in 1899 and 1902.

He also played first-class cricket for Derbyshire from 1901 to 1912.

== Football career ==
=== Early career ===
Needham was born at Newbould Moor, Chesterfield. Having previously played as a forward for Walkley F.C. and Staveley Wanderers, Needham agreed to sign for United when they met his club, Staveley F.C., on 10 February 1891.

=== Sheffield United ===
Needham made his debut for the Blades on 5 September 1891, in a pre-season game against Woolwich Arsenal. Originally a right winger, injuries during his first season saw him move to left half.

Short yet solidly built and blessed with immense stamina, he was fast, resolute and brave. His consistently accomplished and energetic displays made him the star of the side and won him the title, 'the prince of half backs'. Writer Alfred Gibson made the following comments about Needham in 1906:

"There is one thing which has made Earnest Needham stand out of the common run of halves; he is neither a constructive nor a destructive half-back alone; he is both at once. One moment you will see him falling back to the defence of his own goal, or checking the speedy rush of his wing; the next, he is up with his forwards, feeding them to a nicety, and always making the best of every opening. Where he gets his pace from is a mystery. He never seems to be racing, yet he must be moving at racing pace; he never seems to be exhausted, yet in a big game he is practically doing three men's work."

A fine shot, Needham possessed great ball control: "This is one of the secrets of his greatness for very seldom when he has the ball is he deprived of it, whilst the accuracy of his wing passes, and the telling force of his punches straight across the field to an unprotected wing, spell danger to any kind of defence."

After 551 appearances, including 464 Football League games and 49 FA Cup ties, Needham retired from football. His final game for United came on 22 January 1910 against Bolton Wanderers, and with Needham having played in every season in the Football League that United had played, it marked the end of a golden era for the Blades that they have never since matched.

Although Needham was missed by his native club Derby County, his nephew George Wright Needham did play a few games for The Rams.

=== International career ===
Needham made his debut for England against Scotland in April 1894. He was an England regular for many years and the first Sheffield United player to captain the England national side. He represented England 16 times, and the Football League ten times.

== Cricket career ==
Needham was a left-hand batsman who played 340 innings in 186 first-class matches. He scored 6550 runs at 20.15, including seven centuries with a top score of 159. He was an occasional wicket-keeper, and as a right-arm medium pace bowler bowled 21 overs without taking a wicket.

Before playing for Derbyshire, Needham is recorded playing in a match for Liverpool and District against Cambridge University in 1898. He made his debut for Derbyshire in June 1901 against a South African team, and scored 57 in his first innings but was out for a duck in the second. He played regularly every season until 1911. In 1903 he made his first century against Hampshire. He scored 47 in his one innings in the game at Chesterfield in 1904 when visitors Essex set an unwanted record by losing despite amassing 597 in their first innings. In 1907 Needham scored 119 against Hampshire and in 1908 scored three centuries. He scored 104 against Worcestershire and in one match against Essex scored 107 and 104, although this was not enough to stave off defeat. In 1910 he made his top score of 159 against Leicestershire and in 1911 he made 103 against Nottinghamshire. In 1912 he played only three games for Derbyshire.

== Author ==
Needham wrote a ninety-page brochure titled "Association Football" which was published in 1901. From practical experience, Needham offered his own opinions on tactics and formation. It was well received upon publication. One periodical described it as a "valuable book by a practical expert."

== Career statistics ==
Appearances and goals by club, season and competition
Club	Season	League			FA Cup		Other		Total	
Club	Season	Division	Apps	Goals	Apps	Goals	Apps	Goals	Apps	Goals
Sheffield United	1891–92	Northern League	13	3	3	1	0	0	16	4
Sheffield United	1892–93	Second Division	20	5	2	2	10 (Note: One appearance in Football League test matches; nine appearances one goal in Northern League)	1	32	8
Sheffield United	1893–94	First Division	28	5	1	0	7 (Note: Six appearances in United Counties League; one appearance in Wharncliffe Charity Cup)	0	36	5
Sheffield United	1894–95	First Division	26	0	3	0	3 (Note: Appearance(s) in United Counties League)	0	32	0
Sheffield United	1895–96	First Division	24	3	3	2	3 (Note: Appearance(s) in Birmingham Senior Cup)	0	30	5
Sheffield United	1896–97	First Division	29	6	0	0	—		29	6
Sheffield United	1897–98	First Division	29	8	2	1	2 (Note: Appearance(s) in Sheriff of London Charity Shield)	0	31	9
Sheffield United	1898–99	First Division	29	6	9	3	—		38	9
Sheffield United	1899–1900	First Division	25	0	5	2	—		32	2
Sheffield United	1900–01	First Division	23	3	7	0	—		30	3
Sheffield United	1901–02	First Division	26	1	8	1	—		34	2
Sheffield United	1902–03	First Division	26	1	1	1	—		27	2
Sheffield United	1903–04	First Division	26	2	1	0	—		27	2
Sheffield United	1904–05	First Division	33	2	1	0	—		34	2
Sheffield United	1905–06	First Division	27	2	0	0	—		27	2
Sheffield United	1906–07	First Division	33	4	1	0	—		34	4
Sheffield United	1907–08	First Division	32	3	2	0	—		34	3
Sheffield United	1908–09	First Division	24	0	0	0	—		24	0
Sheffield United	1909–10	First Division	4	1	0	0	—		4	1
Sheffield United	Total		477	55	49	13	25	1	551	69

== Honours ==
Sheffield United

- Football League Division One: 1897–98; runner-up: 1896–97, 1899–1900
- Football League Division Two runner-up: 1892–93
- FA Cup: 1899, 1902; runner-up 1901

== Bibliography ==
- Needham, Ernest (1901). Association Football. Soccer Books Ltd. ISBN 978-1-86223-083-5
- Clarebrough, Denis (1989). Sheffield United F.C., The First 100 years. Sheffield United Football Club. ISBN 0-9508588-1-1.
- Young, Percy A. (1962). Football in Sheffield. Stanley Paul & Co Ltd. ISBN 0-9506272-4-0.

Sporting positions
Preceded by William Oakley	England football captain 1901	Succeeded by G.O. Smith
