= W. Robertson =

Scottish footballer

Personal information
- Place of birth: Dundee, Scotland
- Position: Forward

Youth career
- Boys of Dundee

Senior career*
Years	Team	Apps	(Gls)
- Strathmore
1889–1891	Sheffield United	16	(3)
- * Club domestic league appearances and goals

'W. Robertson was a Scottish footballer who played as a forward for Sheffield United.

== Playing career ==
Reported as 'hailing from' Dundee, Robertson was one of a number of Scots who travelled South to sign for Sheffield United in 1889 following the club's advertisements for players published in the Scottish press earlier that year. Signed by the club following a trail, Robertson played in all of United's first 84 games although the majority of these were friendly fixtures. He also scored the club's first goal (in their first ever fixture against Notts Rangers in September 1889), was the first player to score a hat-trick for the club (October 1889 against Sheffield Exchange) and was the first United player to be sent off (March 1890 against Rotherham Town.)

During the club's second season Robertson played fewer and fewer games and was released in the summer of 1891 although there were no contemporary reports in the local media as to what happened to him after that.

== Post-playing career ==
It was reported in 1908 that Robertson was then residing in Haileybury in Ontario, Canada where he was coaching football.
