= William Getliff =

English footballer

Personal information
- Full name: William Henry Getliff
- Date of birth: 1869
- Place of birth: Shustoke, Warwickshire, England
- Date of death: 1955 (aged 85–86)
- Place of death: Shireoaks, Nottinghamshire, England
- Position: Forward

Senior career*
Years	Team	Apps	(Gls)
- Darnall
1891–1892	Sheffield United	0	(0)
- * Club domestic league appearances and goals

William Henry Getliff (1869–1955) was an English footballer who played as a forward. Born in Shustoke Getliff was sometimes referred to as 'Catliff', 'Gatliffe', 'Getliffe' and 'Getcliffe' in differing reports and documents. He was an amateur player playing for Darnall in Sheffield when he was spotted by Sheffield United and offered a professional contract. Getliff duly signed for the club but rejected professional terms, preferring to remain as an amateur and continue teaching. As such he made infrequent appearances, usually in friendly games. His one competitive fixture came in January 1881 when he played in an FA Cup first round fixture against Notts County.

After leaving Bramall Lane in 1892 Getliff became headmaster of St Luke's School in Shireoaks where he lived until his death having spent 31 years at the school. He was also the President of Bassetlaw Cricket League having played cricket for Owlerton in Sheffield in his younger days.
