= Thomas Smith (English footballer) =

English footballer

Personal information
- Full name: Thomas Smith
- Date of birth: 1869
- Place of birth: Ecclesfield, Sheffield, England
- Positions: Outside right; inside right

Senior career*
Years	Team	Apps	(Gls)
1889–1890	Ecclesfield		
1891–1892	Sheffield United	0	(0)
1892–1900	Barnsley	11	(0)
- * Club domestic league appearances and goals

Thomas Smith (1869 – after 1900) was a footballer who played as an outside right or inside right for both Sheffield United and Barnsley in the nineteenth century.

Born in Ecclesfield on the outskirts of Sheffield, Smith had played for his local side from 1889 until around 1890. He was signed by Sheffield United in November 1891 but failed to break into the first team and left the following summer. He moved to Barnsley where he played regularly for several seasons and featured in their first season in the Football League, making eleven appearances in the competition all together.
