= Richard Fenwick (footballer) =

English footballer

Personal information
- Full name: Richard A. Fenwick
- Place of birth: England
- Position: Goalkeeper

Senior career*
Years	Team	Apps	(Gls)
- Sheffield Club
1890–1891	→ Sheffield United (guest)	1	(0)
1893−1894	Doncaster Rovers		(0)
- * Club domestic league appearances and goals

Richard A. Fenwick (occasionally referred to as Fenwicke in some reports) was an English footballer who played as a goalkeeper. An amateur player with Sheffield Club Fenwick began assisting nearby Sheffield United as a guest player in January 1890, as allowed under FA rules at the time. He played in several games during United's inaugural season and remained connected to the club for the following two years. His one competitive game came in the Midland Counties League against Derby Midland in February 1881.

He later joined Doncaster Rovers in the Midland League, signing as an amateur for the 1893−94 season and leaving by the end of that season.
