= George Groves (footballer) =

English footballer and cricketer

Personal information
- Full name: George Jasper Groves
- Date of birth: 19 October 1868
- Place of birth: Nottingham, England
- Date of death: 18 February 1941 (aged 72)
- Place of death: Newmarket, England
- Position: Defender

Senior career*
Years	Team	Apps	(Gls)
1888	Heeley		
1888–1891	Sheffield Club		
1889–1891	→ Sheffield United (guest)	0	(0)
1891–1896	Sheffield United	12	(0)
1892–1896	→ Woolwich Arsenal (guest)		
- * Club domestic league appearances and goals

George Jasper Groves (19 October 1868 – 18 February 1941) was an English footballer who played as a defender, primarily for Sheffield United. He also played first-class cricket for Nottinghamshire.

== Football career ==
Born in Nottingham Groves was an amateur player who played regularly in the Sheffield area from around 1888 when he represented Heeley. He moved to Sheffield Club later the same year but almost immediately began guesting for nearby Sheffield United (as allowed by FA rules regarding amateurs). After appearing regularly in friendly and exhibition fixtures he was signed on a permanent basis by United in March 1891 and remained with the club until the summer of 1896.

Known as 'Mr. Groves' in match reports he was initially a regular for United and was usually named captain but less than a year after joining he moved to London and from then on would only make irregular appearances for the club. He would also appear as a guest for Woolwich Arsenal during the same period but with the game becoming increasingly professional he drifted away from league football.

== Cricket career ==
Groves played in 17 first-class cricket matches for Nottinghamshire in 1899 and 1900, playing as a lower-middle-order right-handed batsman.

== Personal life ==
Groves was a journalist, covering numerous sports in particular cricket and horse racing. Groves retired to Newmarket after his playing career was over, where he continued to write for the Sporting Chronicle until his death. Groves was killed when the Chronicle's offices were hit by a German bomb while he was working on 18 February 1941.
