= Edward Cross (footballer) =

English footballer

Personal information
- Place of birth: Northwich, England
- Position: Right back

Youth career
- Northwich Victoria

Senior career*
| Years | Team | Apps | (Gls) |
| 1889–1890 | Rotherham Town | | |
| 1890–1891 | Sheffield United | 16 | (0) |
| 1891–1892 | Northwich Victoria | | |
| 1892–1893 | Rotherham Town | | |
| 1893–1894 | Chesterfield | | |
| 1894–1895 | Rotherham Town | 2 | (0) |
- * Club domestic league appearances and goals

Edward E. Cross was an English footballer who played as a defender. Born in Northwich he started out with local side Northwich Victoria before moving across the Pennines to play for Rotherham Town. After a season at Town he moved to nearby Sheffield United with whom he played in the Midland Counties League and the FA Cup. After just one season at Bramall Lane he returned to former club Northwhich Victoria before rejoining Rotherham Town.

A brief spell at Chesterfield followed, from whom he was dismissed for not turning up to play the scheduled Easter fixtures, before finishing his career with a third spell with Rotherham Town where he was to make his Football League debut.
