= Staveley F.C. =

- Full name: Staveley Football Club
- Nicknames: Old Foot & Mouth, the Staveleyites
- Founded: 1875
- Dissolved: 1892
- Ground: Recreation Ground
Home colours

Staveley F.C. was a football club in Staveley, a village in Derbyshire, England.

== History ==
The club was founded in 1875 and originally played under the Sheffield rules. The first known matches for the club were in 1876. Key players for the club from its earliest days were the Hay brothers; George as goalkeeper, William as back-up goalkeeper, Sammy as half-back, and Jack as forward, plus later Tom Hay.

Staveley was nicknamed 'Old Foot and Mouth' by opponents due to the highly competitive and hard tackling nature of their players (who would "get a foot in") and the vociferously partisan nature of their supporters.

The club's first success was in the Sheffield Senior Cup in 1879–80, beating Heeley in the final 3–1; the result was considered a shock, with Heeley being 1/4 favourites.

=== FA Cup surprises ===
The club first entered the FA Cup in 1880–81, beating Spilsby 5–1 in the first round, in front of over one thousand spectators. Staveley took the much bigger Sheffield Wednesday club to two replays in the third round, losing at the Lockwood Brothers ground at the third time of asking.

Staveley's two best runs in the Cup were both ended by the professionals of Blackburn Rovers. In 1883–84, the club beat Middlesbrough and gained revenge on Wednesday, helped by Wednesday's Mosforth injuring himself on the railway line before the match, and then beating Lockwood Brothers in the third round before a 2,000 crowd said to be the biggest ever at the Recreation Ground. In the fourth round at Cup holders Blackburn, Staveley took the lead, before Rovers turned the game around.

In 1885–86, the club had a tough first round tie with Mexborough, which went to a replay; however Mexborough scratched from the competition on the morning of the match, because the Sheffield Football Association demanded a local cup tie with Owlerton take place on the same day, requiring Staveley to arrange a friendly against a local side (Lowgates F.C.) at short notice. The club unexpectedly beat both Long Eaton Rangers and Nottingham Forest – in the latter game, relying on time-wasting to run the clock down, "repeatedly kicking out, and the ball was carried into neighbouring streets by the strong wind". Forest protested against the Staveley tactics but the Football Association dismissed the protest. The tactic was so notorious that supporters in the region would shout "Play up, Staveley!" whenever another team adopted the same stratagem.

Staveley had gone over 30 matches in the season without defeat before meeting Blackburn Rovers again in the fifth round, but the repeat holders proved too strong for the club.

=== Local success and tragedy ===
The club was the most successful in Derbyshire in the 1880s, reaching five consecutive Derbyshire Cup finals, albeit helped by Derby County boycotting the competition for part of the period. However Staveley was not considered for Football League membership, given the small size of the village and the low crowds that were likely.

Staveley also entered the Birmingham Senior Cup from 1883–84 to 1885–86, its best run coming in 1884–85. The club reached the quarter-final, and almost pulled off an almighty shock, drawing 1–1 with holders and eventual winners Aston Villa at the Aston Lower Grounds, but, with the replay taking place at the same venue, and Staveley being forced to do without Wilshaw in the replay, it could not repeat the feat.

While playing for Staveley, on 12 January 1889 against Grimsby Town at Clee Park, Lincolnshire, William Cropper collided with Dan Doyle, the Grimsby rightback, after fifteen minutes. He was badly injured by Doyle's knee in his abdomen and left the field in obvious distress. The collision resulted in a ruptured bowel and he died in the dressing room at Grimsby in the arms of his Staveley and Derbyshire County Cricket Club teammate George Hay.

=== Midland League ===
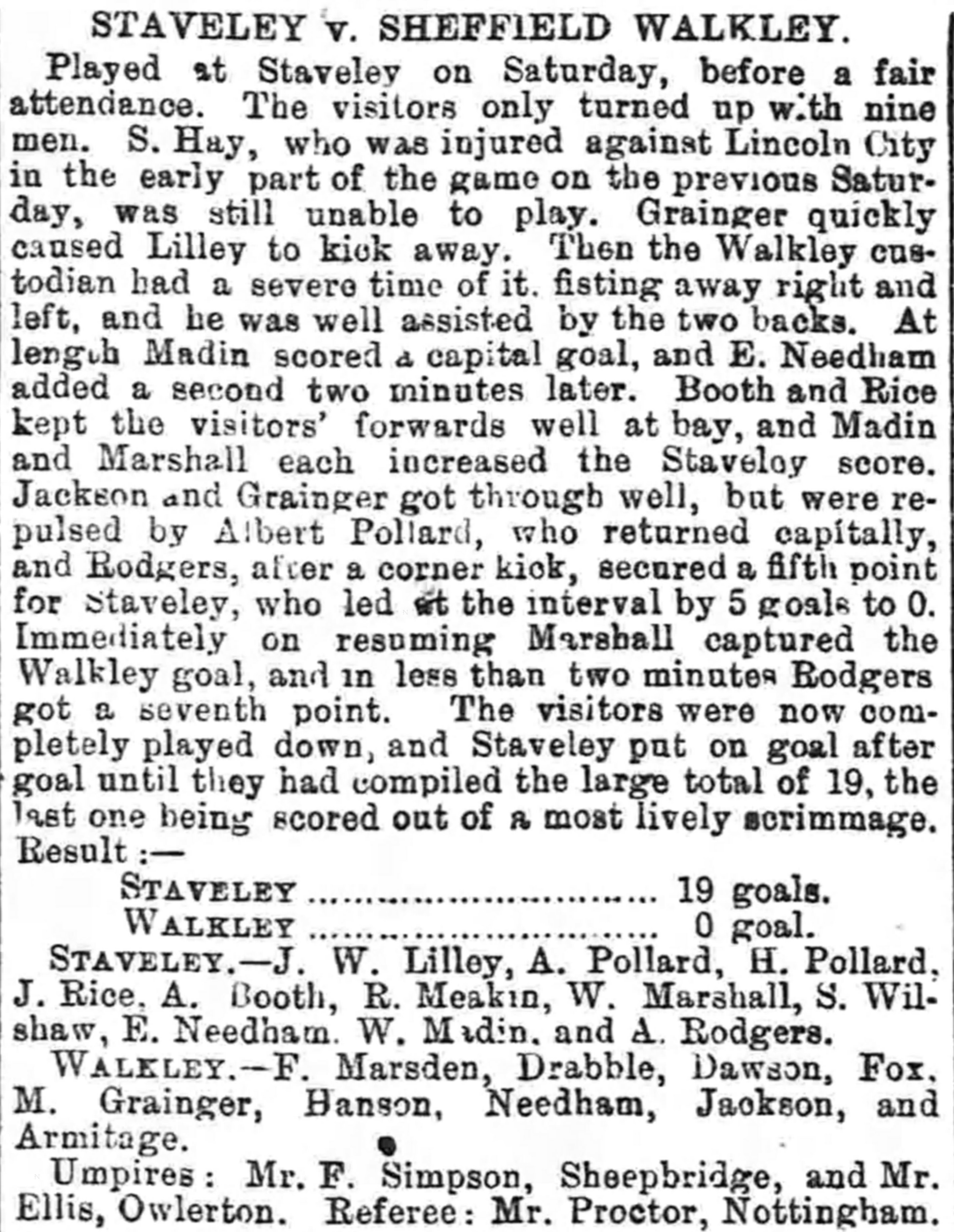
Staveley's record win, 19–0 over Walkley in the 1890–91 FA Cup 1st qualifying round, Sheffield Independent, 6 October 1890

The club was a founder member of the Midland League, but the club did not survive three seasons, given the difficulties of a village side in the professional era. Staveley finished mid-table in 1889–90, but was bottom in 1890–91, in part because of the resignation of Warwick County and Kidderminster, who would both have finished below the club.

Despite the balance sheet at the end of the 1890–91 season being in a "satisfactory condition", the club went bust in 1891 and its fixtures were expunged from the league; at the time the club was bottom of the table, with 1 win and 1 draw from 8 fixtures, the final match being an 8–0 defeat at Burton Wanderers on 5 December.

The club intended to complete its Cup fixtures, and played its Derbyshire Senior Cup semi-final at Derby County reserves on 2 January 1892, but lost 10–0, with many of its regular players declining to play, and George Hay watching from the pavilion. The club's debts of over £30 were cleared by a benefit match played at Bramall Lane, but the club remained in abeyance for the rest of the season, the club secretary Captain Turner attending the Derbyshire FA end of season meeting to bemoan the rise of professionalism that had been "the ruin of the Staveley club". The club did not renew its membership of the Derbyshire FA for the 1892–93 season and was therefore defunct.

A club of the same name briefly re-emerged later in the decade, playing junior football only, but again involving the Hay family.

== Colours ==
The club originally played in amber with a black hoop, switching to navy in 1881. At some point before 1885 they had changed to red and black quarters (the contemporary term for halves).

== Grounds ==
The club's first ground was the Recreation Ground, near the Crown Inn. The ground was described as "rather peculiar in shape and size", giving Staveley a considerable home advantage.

The club's final match at the Recreation was a 2–1 defeat to Gainsborough Trinity on 19 April 1890, in front of 1,000 spectators, as the MS&L railway from Beighton to Chesterfield was due to run through part of the ground. The club planned to move to a new ground for the 1890–91 season after the sale of part of the Recreation, but as it was not ready, the club played at the Staveley Works Cricket Ground. The new ground was meant to be ready for the ill-fated 1891–92 season but it never seems to have been completed.

== Honours ==
- FA Cup
  - Best season: last 16, 1883–84 (4th round), 1885–86 (5th round)
- Derbyshire Senior Cup
  - Winners: 1883–84, 1884–85, 1886–87, 1888–89
  - Runners-up: 1885–86, 1887–88
- Derbyshire Charity Cup
  - Winners 1885
- Sheffield Association Cup
  - Winners: 1879–80

== Records ==
- Record victory: 19–0 v Walkley, 1890–91 FA Cup 1st qualifying round

== Notable players ==
- Ernest Needham
- William Cropper
- James Beresford
