= 1889–90 Sheffield United F.C. season =

Sheffield United
1889–90 season
- Chairman: Michael Ellison
- Secretary: Joseph Wostinholm
- FA Cup: Second round (eliminated by Bolton Wanderers)
- Sheffield Challenge Cup: Runners up (beaten by Rotherham Town)
- Wharncliffe Charity Cup: Semi-final (eliminated by Staveley)
- Top goalscorer: League: None; All: Galbraith (4)
- Highest home attendance: 3,000 (FA Cup vs. Heeley)
- Average home league attendance: 2,250 (FA Cup)
Home colours

The 1889–90 season was the first in existence for Sheffield United. Having not been elected to any organised league at that point they predominantly played friendly fixtures but did enter the FA Cup for the first time as well as locally arranged cup competitions The Sheffield Challenge Cup and the Wharncliffe Charity Cup. The club did not employ a manager in this period; tactics and team selection were decided by The Football Committee and the players were coached by a trainer. J.B. Wostinholm held the position of club secretary, dealing with player transfers and contracts, arranging matches and dealing with the FA. The first season was deemed a reasonable success with steady attendances to home games and progress in the FA Cup although the fluctuating nature of the team meant that consistency was never really achieved.

As the season progressed it became obvious that a better standard of player would be required to succeed in League Football and the club began to recruit new players in the spring, notably signing Rab Howell, Mick Whitham and Arthur Watson from nearby Rotherham Swifts who were in financial difficulties. United eventually reached the second round proper of the FA Cup where they were comprehensively beaten by the more experienced Bolton Wanderers and finished the season having been accepted to play in the newly formed Midland Counties League the following term.

== Background ==
Sheffield United had been formed earlier in 1889 by the organising committee of the Sheffield United Cricket Club in response to the growing popularity of the game. They viewed a football team as a means of generating extra revenue and a greater utilisation of the club facilities, particularly in the winter months. The initial plan was to sign a core squad of players and augment them with the best amateur players from the region as guests. The club had duly advertised for players in the local press and in Glasgow as it was considered that Scotland was an untapped pool of talent. Respondents were invited for trials and a basic squad were offered contracts.

== Kit ==
For their first season the team wore a plain white 'jersey' and blue 'knickers' and socks. The club would not adopt its now traditional red and white stripes until the following season.

== Season overview ==
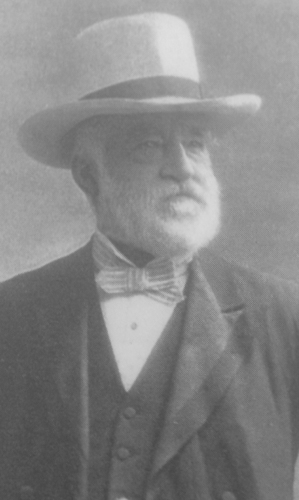
J.B. Wostinholm was the club secretary and responsible for football matters

With a team assembled over the summer months, United played their first ever fixture against Notts Rangers on 7 September 1889, a game which they lost 4–1. As they were not part of any organised league the club arranged a series of friendly and exhibition games to fill the schedule of their fledgling club. Their opponents were drawn both from the local area (Sheffield having a number of established teams at this time) and from further afield, particularly the North-West and West Midlands.

The establishment of a new, well-financed, football team in the city had caused some consternation amongst the local FA and United undertook a low-key start, not playing their first game at Bramall Lane until the end of September, against Birmingham St. George's. The team continued to play regularly and attendances at Bramall Lane steadily increased as interest in the new side grew. The team performed well against local sides but the fluctuating nature of the squad during this period meant there was little consistency in results. By December however, it had become clear that better quality of players would be required if the club was to develop and take on the more established sides playing in the Football League. The initial plan of maintaining a core of players that would be boosted from the ranks of the local amateur game had not borne fruit as the players who appeared were often ageing and past their best. Similarly the players recruited from Scotland had largely failed to impress and so the football committee looked to bring in fresh players to strengthen the team.

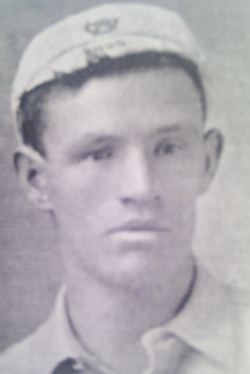
Rab Howell was signed from Rotherham Swifts in March 1890

Ironically, their first two new signings were a Scot, William Calder, and another local amateur, T.B.A. Clarke, who both arrived in December 1889 but the team was beginning to take on a more professional image. The team continued their campaign of friendly fixtures into 1890, with varying degrees of success, whilst competing in the FA Cup for the first time. With the club hoping to be accepted into the newly formed Midland Counties League for the following season the committee made a number of additions to the squad in March, signing Billy Bairstow from local side Sheffield Club but more significantly signing a trio of players from nearby Rotherham Swifts. Rab Howell, Arthur Watson and Michael Whitham would all become stalwarts of the team in the coming seasons, with both Howell and Whitham subsequently going on to represent England. They represented United's first reported entry into the transfer market, arriving for a combined fee of £200, and signalled a new era of full professionalism for the club.

=== FA Cup ===
United made their debut in the FA Cup in an away fixture against Scarborough on 7 October 1889, a game which they comprehensively won 6–1. Required to play a number of qualifying games they went on to play various local sides before reaching the First round proper when they took on Burnley in January 1990. Having dispatched the Clarets, United were drawn against another Lancashire side in the next round – Bolton Wanderers. Giving up home advantage in return for a payment of £40 (a practice that was actually against the rules of the competition) they travelled across the Pennines only to be trounced 13–0, a result that remains United's worst ever cup defeat.

=== Local cup competitions ===
United entered both the Sheffield Challenge Cup and the Wharncliffe Charity Cup during the course of the season. Both competitions were ratified by the Sheffield FA and as such were viewed as fully competitive fixtures within the local area. United progressed through three early rounds of the Challenge Cup, beating Sheffield Exchange, Heeley and Attercliffe before facing Staveley at Bramall Lane in the semi-final. A 2–0 victory was enough to see them progress to the team's first ever 'cup final' where they took on an experienced Rotherham Town side over two legs. United were held to a 0–0 draw in the first fixture at Bramall Lane but succumbed to a single goal in the return leg which was played at the ground of Rotherham Swifts.

The Wharncliffe Cup was a smaller affair and The Blades needed only to beat Doncaster Rovers in a home game to progress to the semi-final. They travelled to Staveley but were beaten 2–1 by their hosts.

== Squad ==
=== First team ===
Note: Flags indicate national team as defined under FIFA eligibility rules; some limited exceptions apply. Players may hold more than one non-FIFA nationality.

Pos.	Nation	Player
FW	ENG	Billy Bairstow
FW	SCO	William Calder
FW	ENG	T.B.A. Clarke
FW	SCO	James Duncan
GK	ENG	Richard Fenwick (guest player from Sheffield Club)
MF	SCO	Donald Fraser (Note: Fraser was listed as 'Donald' (implying that it was his family name) in match reports for the first half of the season for reasons unknown.)
FW	SCO	Dugald Galbraith
DF	SCO	L. Gilmartin
DF	ENG	George Groves (guest player from Sheffield Club)
DF	ENG	Walter Hobson

Pos.	Nation	Player
DF	ENG	Rab Howell
GK	ENG	Charlie Howlett
DF	ENG	Jack Hudson (captain)
DF	ENG	J. Jeeves (guest player from Sheffield Club)
DF	ENG	S. Mack
FW	ENG	Billy Mosforth
FW	SCO	W. Robertson
DF	ENG	Ned Stringer
FW	ENG	Arthur Watson
DF	ENG	Michael Whitham

=== Players leaving before end of the season ===
Note: Flags indicate national team as defined under FIFA eligibility rules; some limited exceptions apply. Players may hold more than one non-FIFA nationality.

Pos.	Nation	Player
MF	ENG	George Aizlewood (Note: George H. Aizlewood was an amateur Sheffield Club forward who had previously played for Park Friendly, Attercliffe and Collegiate. He was United's first substitute as he arrived late for his debut, with Billy Mosforth playing until he arrived.) (guest player from Sheffield Club)
DF	SCO	Robert Gordon (Note: Robert Gordon was a Scottish full back who was one of the first players signed by United. He had played for Glanfield in Glasgow and captained Northern Glasgow. He played in only one friendly game for United.)

Pos.	Nation	Player
FW	ENG	Billy Madin
MF		'T. Wilson'

=== Other players ===
During this season a number of other players played first team games for United during their various fixtures. They were either triallists who were not retained or local players drawn from neighbouring clubs as 'guests'. The only guest player to feature in a competitive fixture was 'T. Wilson' who played in the FA Cup first round match against Burnley. 'Wilson' was most likely a pseudonym and his true identity remains unknown.

== Transfers ==
=== In ===
Position	Player	Transferred from	Fee	Date	Source
DF	(England) Jack Hudson	Unknown	Signed	30 May 1889	
DF	(England) S. Mack	(England) Gainsborough Trinity	Signed	30 May 1889	
FW	(England) Billy Mosforth	(England) Owlerton	Signed	30 May 1889	
FW	(Scotland) James Duncan	(Scotland) Boys of Dundee	Signed	1 August 1889	
FW	(Scotland) Donald Fraser	Unknown	Signed	1 August 1889	
FW	(Scotland) Dugald Galbraith	Unknown	Signed	1 August 1889	
DF	(Scotland) L. Gilmartin	Unknown	Signed	1 August 1889	
DF	(Scotland) Robert Gordon	Unknown	Signed	1 August 1889	
DF	(England) Walter Hobson	(England) Owlerton	Signed	1 August 1889	
GK	(England) Charlie Howlett	(England) Gainsborough Trinity	Signed	1 August 1889	
FW	(England) Billy Madin	(England) Staveley	Signed	1 August 1889	
FW	(Scotland) W. Robertson	(Scotland) Strathmore	Signed	1 August 1889	
DF	(England) Ned Stringer	(England) Ecclesfield	Signed	1 August 1889	
FW	(Scotland) William Calder	Unknown	Signed	5 December 1899	
FW	(England) T.B.A. Clarke	Wentworth	Signed	20 December 1899	
FW	(England) Billy Bairstow	(England) Sheffield Club	Signed	1 March 1890	
DF	(England) Rab Howell	(England) Rotherham Swifts	£200 (combined)	24 March 1890 (Note: The three players were initially signed on trial and a full transfer was completed some time later in the season for a combined fee of £200.)	
DF	(England) Arthur Watson	(England) Rotherham Swifts	£200 (combined)	24 March 1890	
DF	(England) Michael Whitham	(England) Rotherham Swifts	£200 (combined)	24 March 1890	

=== Out ===
Position	Player	Transferred to	Fee	Date	Source
DF	(Scotland) Robert Gordon	Released	Free	September 1889	
FW	(England) Billy Madin	(England) Staveley	Free	15 April 1890	

== Appearances and goals ==
As of the end of the season

No.	Pos	Nat	Player	Total		FA Cup	
No.	Pos	Nat	Player	Apps	Goals	Apps	Goals
	FW	(Scotland) SCO	William Calder	2	0	2	0
	FW	(Scotland) SCO	James Duncan	7	1	7	1
	FW	(Scotland) SCO	Donald Fraser	5	3	5	3
	FW	(Scotland) SCO	Dugald Galbraith	7	4	7	4
	DF	(Scotland) SCO	L. Gilmartin	7	0	7	0
	DF	(England) ENG	Walter Hobson	7	0	7	0
	GK	(England) ENG	Charlie Howlett	7	0	7	0
	DF	(England) ENG	Jack Hudson	6	0	6	0
	DF	(England) ENG	S. Mack	7	0	7	0
	FW	(England) ENG	Billy Madin	3	0	3	0
	FW	(England) ENG	Billy Mosforth	4	2	4	2
	FW	(Scotland) SCO	W. Robertson	7	2	7	2
	DF	(England) ENG	Ned Stringer	7	0	7	0
	MF		'T. Wilson' (Note: The scorer 'T. Wilson' was a trialist, most likely a pseudonym as it was against the rules of the competition to field non-registered players. Agreement must have been reached with Burnley to allow him to play. There is no indication he ever played for United again under any other name.)	1	1	1	1

== Results ==
=== Key ===
Win Draw Loss

=== FA Cup ===
5 October 1889 First qualifying round	Scarborough	1–6	Sheffield United	Recreation Ground
			Galbraith ( ) Fraser ( ) Robertson ( ) Mosforth ( )	Attendance: 'Very good'

26 October 1889 (Note: The tie was originally drawn as an away fixture for United but switched to Bramall Lane.) Second qualifying round	Sheffield United	1–0	Heeley	Bramall Lane
	Stokes ( )			Attendance: 3,000

11 November 1889 Third qualifying round	Sheffield United	3–0	Sheffield Club	Bramall Lane
	Fraser ( ) Willey ( ) Duncan ( )			Attendance: 2,000

7 December 1889 Fourth qualifying round	Rotherham Town	2–2	Sheffield United	Clifton Lane
			Galbraith ( ) Unknown ( )	Attendance: 1,500

21 December 1889 Fourth qualifying round replay	Sheffield United	2–1	Rotherham Town	Bramall Lane
	Mosforth ( ) Galbraith ( )			Attendance: 2,000

18 January 1890; First round	Sheffield United	2–1	Burnley	Bramall Lane
	Robertson ( ) 'Wilson' ( )			Attendance: 2,000

1 February 1890 (Note: The tie had been drawn to be played at Bramall Lane but was switched to Bolton for a payment of £40, an arrangement against the rules of the competition. There had been heavy rain previously and the pitch was in a bad condition. Anecdotal reports of the time suggest that Howlett, the United goalkeeper who had poor eyesight, lost his glasses early on in the game and spent much of the match searching for them in the muddy goal mouth.) Second round	Bolton Wanderers	13–0	Sheffield United	Pike's Lane
				Attendance: 3,750

=== Sheffield Challenge Cup ===
19 October 1889 First round	Sheffield United	7–0	Exchange	Bramall Lane
	Hudson ( ) Robertson ( ) Fraser ( ) Unknown ( )			Attendance: 3,750

2 December 1889 Second round	Sheffield United	1–0	Heeley	Bramall Lane
	Unknown ( )			Attendance: 500

27 January 1890 Third round	Sheffield United	6–0	Attercliffe	Bramall Lane
	Calder ( ) Galbraith ( ) Hudson ( ) Duncan ( ) Hobson ( )			Attendance: 650

8 February 1890 Semi-final	Sheffield United	2–0	Staveley	Bramall Lane
	Anonymous ( ) Calder ( )			Attendance: 4,500

15 March 1890 Final	Sheffield United	0–0	Rotherham Town	Bramall Lane
				Attendance: 5,500

22 March 1890 (Note: Played at the ground of Rotherham Swifts. Robertson was sent off – becoming the first United player ever to be dismissed.) Final replay	Rotherham Town	1–0	Sheffield United	The Holmes, Rotherham
			W. Robertson (red card) '	Attendance: 5,000

=== Wharncliffe Charity Cup ===
26 December 1889 First round	Sheffield United	2–1	Doncaster Rovers	Bramall Lane
	Mosforth ( )			Attendance: 3,000

17 March 1990 Semi-final	Staveley	2–1	Sheffield United	Recreation Ground, Chesterfield
			Mosforth ( )	Attendance: 4,000

=== Friendlies ===
7 September 1889	Notts Rangers	4–1	Sheffield United
			Robertson ( )	Attendance: 1,000

14 September 1889	Heeley	1–2	Sheffield United	Sheaf House, Sheffield
			Duncan ( ) Mack ( )	Attendance: 2,200

21 September 1889	Lincoln City	0–1	Sheffield United	John O'Gaunts
			Duncan ( )	Attendance: 1,900

28 September 1889	Sheffield United	0–4	Birmingham St. George's	Bramall Lane
				Attendance: 3,000

30 September 1889	Sheffield United	3–1	Grimsby Town	Bramall Lane
	Mosforth ( ) Fraser ( ) Galbraith ( )			Attendance: 1,500

3 October 1889	Sheffield United	7–1	King's Own Light Infantry	Bramall Lane
	Duncan ( ) Fraser ( ) Robertson ( ) Galbraith ( )Unknown ( )			Attendance: 300

12 October 1889 (Note: Match consisted of only 30 minutes each way)	Grimsby Town	3–1	Sheffield United	Abbey Park Stadium
			Unknown ( )	Attendance: 750

14 October 1889	Sheffield United	3–1	Lincoln City	Bramall Lane
	Mosforth ( ) Fraser ( ) Robertson ( )			Attendance: 2,000

21 October 1889	Sheffield United	2–3	Notts County	Bramall Lane
	Mosforth ( ) Duncan ( )			Attendance: 2,000

28 October 1889	Sheffield	1–1	Sheffield United	?
			Unknown ( )	Attendance: 'Moderate'

2 November 1889	Sheffield United	3–0	Doncaster Rovers	Bramall Lane
	Galbraith ( ) Robertson ( ) Fraser ( )			Attendance: 1,250

9 November 1889	Staveley	7–0	Sheffield United	?
				Attendance: 'Good'

16 November 1889	Newton Heath	7–1	Sheffield United	North Road
			Hobson ( )	Attendance: 2,000

18 November 1889 (Note: The match was floodlit using Wells light. Aizlewood was selected but missed his train and was late arriving. Mosforth played for the first few minutes until Aizlewood had changed and the players were then substituted. This was a considerable time before substitutes were officially allowed during a match.)	Sheffield United	0–2	Bolton Wanderers	Bramall Lane
				Attendance: 3,000

23 November 1889	Sheffield United	1–1	Rotherham Town	Bramall Lane
	Unknown ( )			Attendance: 2,200

25 November 1889 (Note: 'Jones' the goal scorer was an alias for a Scottish player on trial who, along with a fellow Scot (referred to as 'Smith'), played in this and the previous game. There is no record of who these players were, although 'Jones' may have been William Calder who was signed by the club a few weeks later.)	Sheffield United	2–0	Nottingham Forest	Bramall Lane
	'Jones' ( ) Duncan ( )			Attendance: 500

9 December 1889 (Note: The scorer George Bakewell was on trial from Derby County.)	Sheffield United	1–6	Everton	Bramall Lane
	Bakewell ( )			Attendance: 1,000

23 December 1889	Casuals	1–0	Sheffield United	Kennington Oval
				Attendance: 'Small'

25 December 1889	Lincoln City	5–1	Sheffield United	John O'Gaunts
			Unknown ( )	Attendance: 3,500

27 December 1889	Sheffield United	3–3	Casuals	Bramall Lane
	Duncan ( ) Galbraith ( )			Attendance: 2,000

28 December 1889 (Note: Match abandoned on 80 minutes due to failing light.)	Doncaster Rovers	2–0 (abnd. 80 mins)	Sheffield United	Intake Ground
				Attendance: 1,000

4 January 1890	Sheffield United	2–1	Gorton Villa	Bramall Lane
	Clarke ( ) Robertson ( )			Attendance: 2,000

6 January 1890	Sheffield United	1–3	Corinthians	Bramall Lane
	Clarke ( )			Attendance: 1,500

8 January 1890 (Note: Played in the evening under floodlights.)	Everton	5–2	Sheffield United	Anfield
			Clarke ( ) Robertson ( )	Attendance: 5,000

11 January 1890	Derby Midland	2–1	Sheffield United	?
			Madin ( )	Attendance: 1,500

25 January 1890	Sheffield United	3–1	Derby Midland	Bramall Lane
	Duncan ( ) Storer ( )			Attendance: 3,000

15 February 1890	Grimsby Town	7–0	Sheffield United	Abbey Park Stadium
				Attendance: 300

22 February 1890	Middlesbrough	6–4	Sheffield United	Linthorpe Road
			Galbraith ( ) Robertson ( ) Duncan ( ) Calder ( )	Attendance: 3,000

24 February 1890	Sheffield United	4–0	Sheffield	Bramall Lane
	Galbraith ( ) Robertson ( )			Attendance: 'Meagre'

1 March 1890	Sheffield United	1–2	Nottingham Forest	Bramall Lane
	Robertson ( )			Attendance: 2,500

3 March 1890	Sheffield United	2–1	Newton Heath	Bramall Lane
	Galbraith ( ) Robertson ( )			Attendance: 1,000

8 March 1890	Sheffield United	2–1	Warwick County	Bramall Lane
	Calder ( ) Hudson ( )			Attendance: 'Good'

24 March 1890	Sheffield United	1–1	Halliwell	Bramall Lane
	Howell ( )			Attendance: 1,000

29 March 1890	Doncaster Rovers	1–1	Sheffield United	Intake Ground
			Charlton ( ) (Charlton was a trialist)	Attendance: 1,500

4 April 1890	Rotherham Town	1–2	Sheffield United	Clifton Lane
			Howell ( ) Robertson ( )	Attendance: 5,000

5 April 1890	Sheffield United	2–1	Staveley	Bramall Lane
	Watson ( ) Howell ( )			Attendance: 1,000

7 April 1890 (Note: The match was abandoned on 75 minutes following consultation with both teams and the match umpires due to excessive rain)	Sheffield United	1–1 (abnd. 75 min.)	Crewe Alexandra	Bramall Lane
	Bairstow ( )			Attendance: 1,000

8 April 1890	Sheffield United	3–2	Stoke	Bramall Lane
	Bairstow ( ) Clarke ( ) Watson ( )			Attendance: 1,000

12 April 1890	Gorton Villa	2–2	Sheffield United	?
			Bairstow ( ) Clarke ( )	Attendance: 2,000

14 April 1890	Staveley	2–1	Sheffield United	?
			Clarke ( )	Attendance: 'Good'

19 April 1890	Newcastle East End	2–0	Sheffield United	Chillingham Road
				Attendance: 1,000

== Notes ==
Source:

== Bibliography ==
- Clarebrough and Kirkham (2008). Sheffield United Who's Who. Hallamshire Press. ISBN 978-1-874718-69-7.
- Clarebrough and Kirkham (1999). A Complete Record of Sheffield United Football Club 1889–1999. Hallamshire Press. ISBN 0-9508588-2-X.
