= List of Sheffield United F.C. seasons =

Graph showing Sheffield United's final league position in every season since joining the Football League

This is a list of seasons played by Sheffield United Football Club from 1889 (when Sheffield United first competed in the FA Cup) to the present day. It details the club's achievements in major competitions, and the top scorers for each season.

== Seasons ==
As of match played 02 May 2026

Season (Note: Until 2012, season performance sourced from Clarebrough & Kirkham (2012), Sheffield United: The Complete Record. After 2012, sourced from Soccerbase.)	League									FA Cup	League Cup	Other		Top goalscorer(s) (Note: For each season, goals in all the competitions listed are included. Until 2012, League & FA Cup goals sourced from the English National Football Archive (subscription required), other competitions sourced from Clarebrough & Kirkham (2012), Sheffield United: The Complete Record. After 2012, all competitions sourced from Soccerbase.)	
Season	Division	Pld	W	D	L	GF	GA	Pts	Pos	FA Cup	League Cup	Other		Player(s)	Goals
1889–90										R2		Sheffield Challenge Cup Wharncliffe Charity Cup	RU SF	Dugald Galbraith W. Robertson	5
1890–91	Midland League	18	8	3	7	32	25	19	5th	R1		Sheffield Challenge Cup	RU	Arthur Watson	14
1891–92	Northern League	16	10	2	4	49	21	22	3rd	R2		Sheffield Challenge Cup	W	Sammy Dobson	15
1892–93	Division 2 (2)	22	16	3	3	62	19	35	2nd	R2		Test Match Northern League Wharncliffe Charity Cup	W 3rd W (Note: Shared with Sheffield Wednesday, after a 0–0 draw.)	Harry Hammond	22
1893–94	Division 1 (1)	30	13	5	12	47	61	31	10th	R1		United Counties League Wharncliffe Charity Cup	GS W	Bob Hill	11
1894–95	Division 1 (1)	30	14	4	12	57	55	32	6th	R2				Harry Hammond	15
1895–96	Division 1 (1)	30	10	6	14	40	50	26	12th	R2		Birmingham Cup Birmingham Charity Cup	RU RU	Harry Hammond	12
1896–97	Division 1 (1)	30	13	10	7	42	29	36	2nd	R1				Fred Priest	12
1897–98	Division 1 (1)	30	17	8	5	56	31	42	1st	R1		Sheriff of London Charity Shield	W (Note: Shared with Corinthian, after a 0–0 and 1–1 draw.)	Walter Bennett	12
1898–99	Division 1 (1)	34	9	11	14	45	51	29	16th	W				George Hedley	12
1899–1900	Division 1 (1)	34	18	12	4	63	33	48	2nd	QF				Billy Beer	15
1900–01	Division 1 (1)	34	12	7	15	35	52	31	14th	RU				Walter Bennett	12
1901–02	Division 1 (1)	34	13	7	14	53	48	33	10th	W				Fred Priest	21
1902–03	Division 1 (1)	34	17	5	12	58	44	39	4th	R2				Fred Priest	10
1903–04	Division 1 (1)	34	15	8	11	62	57	38	7th	QF				Arthur Brown	20
1904–05	Division 1 (1)	34	19	2	13	64	56	40	6th	R1				Arthur Brown	22
1905–06	Division 1 (1)	38	15	6	17	57	62	36	13th	R2				Arthur Brown	19
1906–07	Division 1 (1)	38	17	11	10	57	55	45	4th	R1				Arthur Brown	22
1907–08	Division 1 (1)	38	12	11	15	52	58	35	17th	R1				Arthur Brown	16
1908–09	Division 1 (1)	38	14	9	15	51	59	37	12th	R1				Wally Hardinge	11
1909–10	Division 1 (1)	38	16	10	12	62	41	42	6th	R1				Joe Kitchen	21
1910–11	Division 1 (1)	38	15	8	15	49	43	38	9th	R1				Joe Kitchen	18
1911–12	Division 1 (1)	38	13	10	15	63	56	36	14th	R1				Bobby Evans	12
1912–13	Division 1 (1)	38	14	6	18	56	70	34	15th	R1				Wally Hardinge	11
1913–14	Division 1 (1)	38	16	5	17	63	60	37	10th	SF				Stan Fazackerley	23
1914–15	Division 1 (1)	38	15	13	10	49	41	43	6th	W				Joe Kitchen	16
No competitive football was played between 1915 and 1919 due to the First World War
1919–20	Division 1 (1)	42	16	8	18	59	69	40	14th	R2				Stan Fazackerley	15
1920–21	Division 1 (1)	42	6	18	18	42	68	30	20th	R1		County Cup	W	Harry Johnson	13
1921–22	Division 1 (1)	42	15	10	17	59	54	40	11th	R1		County Cup	SF	Harry Johnson	17
1922–23	Division 1 (1)	42	16	10	16	68	64	42	10th	SF		County Cup	SF	Harry Johnson	19
1923–24	Division 1 (1)	42	19	12	11	69	49	50	5th	R1		County Cup	W	Billy Gillespie Harry Johnson	16
1924–25	Division 1 (1)	42	13	13	16	55	63	39	14th	W		County Cup	SF	Harry Johnson	22
1925–26	Division 1 (1)	42	19	8	15	102	82	46	5th	R4		County Cup	W	Harry Johnson	27
1926–27	Division 1 (1)	42	17	10	15	74	86	44	8th	R3		County Cup	SF	Harry Johnson	24
1927–28	Division 1 (1)	42	15	10	17	79	86	40	13th	SF		County Cup	SF	Harry Johnson	43
1928–29	Division 1 (1)	42	15	11	16	86	85	41	11th	R3		County Cup	RU	Harry Johnson	31
1929–30	Division 1 (1)	42	15	6	21	91	96	36	20th	R4		County Cup	W	Jimmy Dunne	42
1930–31	Division 1 (1)	42	14	10	18	78	84	38	15th	R5		County Cup	W	Jimmy Dunne	50
1931–32	Division 1 (1)	42	20	6	16	80	75	46	7th	R4		County Cup	SF	Jimmy Dunne	35
1932–33	Division 1 (1)	42	17	9	16	74	80	43	10th	R4		County Cup	W	Jimmy Dunne	32
1933–34	Division 1 (1)	42	12	7	23	58	101	31	22nd	R3		County Cup	SF	Billy Boyd	17
1934–35	Division 2 (2)	42	16	9	17	79	70	41	11th	R4		County Cup	SF	Jock Dodds	19
1935–36	Division 2 (2)	42	20	12	10	79	50	52	3rd	RU		County Cup	RU	Jock Dodds	41
1936–37	Division 2 (2)	42	18	10	14	66	54	46	7th	R4		County Cup	RU	Jock Dodds	28
1937–38	Division 2 (2)	42	22	9	11	73	56	53	3rd	R4		County Cup	SF	Jock Dodds	23
1938–39	Division 2 (2)	42	20	14	8	69	41	54	2nd	R5		County Cup	W (Note: Shared with Sheffield Wednesday, after a 0–0 draw.)	Jock Dodds	20
No competitive football was played between 1939 and 1945 due to the Second World War
1945–46	n/a (Note: The FA Cup was contested in 1945–46 but The Football League did not resume until the following season.)									R4				Colin Collindridge	4
1946–47	Division 1 (1)	42	21	7	14	89	75	49	6th	QF				Colin Collindridge	18
1947–48	Division 1 (1)	42	16	10	16	65	70	42	12th	R3		County Cup	SF	Colin Collindridge	12
1948–49	Division 1 (1)	42	11	11	20	57	78	33	22nd	R4		County Cup	RU	Colin Collindridge	17
1949–50	Division 2 (2)	42	19	14	9	68	49	52	3rd	R4		County Cup	RU	Harold Brook	21
1950–51	Division 2 (2)	42	16	12	14	72	62	44	8th	R4		County Cup	SF	Jimmy Hagan	17
1951–52	Division 2 (2)	42	18	5	19	90	76	41	11th	QF		County Cup	W	Alf Ringstead	27
1952–53	Division 2 (2)	42	25	10	7	97	55	60	1st	R4		County Cup	W	Alf Ringstead	24
1953–54	Division 1 (1)	42	11	11	20	69	90	33	20th	R3		County Cup	W	Harold Brook Derek Hawksworth	14
1954–55	Division 1 (1)	42	17	7	18	70	86	41	13th	R3		County Cup	SF	Derek Hawksworth	14
1955–56	Division 1 (1)	42	12	9	21	63	77	33	22nd	R5		County Cup	RU	Bobby Howitt	14
1956–57	Division 2 (2)	42	19	8	15	87	76	46	7th	R3		County Cup	W	Derek Hawksworth	22
1957–58	Division 2 (2)	42	21	10	11	75	50	52	6th	R5		County Cup	W	Derek Pace	21
1958–59	Division 2 (2)	42	23	7	12	82	48	53	3rd	QF		County Cup	W	Derek Pace	31
1959–60	Division 2 (2)	42	19	12	11	68	51	50	4th	QF		County Cup	W	Derek Pace	33
1960–61	Division 2 (2)	42	26	6	10	81	51	58	2nd	SF	R2			Derek Pace	26
1961–62	Division 1 (1)	42	19	9	14	61	69	47	5th	QF	QF			Derek Pace	28
1962–63	Division 1 (1)	42	16	12	14	58	60	44	10th	R5	R3			Derek Pace	21
1963–64	Division 1 (1)	42	16	11	15	61	64	43	12th	R4	R2	County Cup	W	Derek Pace	15
1964–65	Division 1 (1)	42	12	11	19	50	64	35	19th	R4	R2	County Cup	W	Mick Jones	17
1965–66	Division 1 (1)	42	16	11	15	56	59	43	9th	R4	R2	County Cup	RU	Mick Jones	22
1966–67	Division 1 (1)	42	16	10	16	52	59	42	10th	R5	QF	County Cup	W	Mick Jones	21
1967–68	Division 1 (1)	42	11	10	21	49	70	32	21st	QF	R2	County Cup	SF	Gil Reece	13
1968–69	Division 2 (2)	42	16	11	15	61	50	43	9th	R3	R2	County Cup	W	John Tudor	16
1969–70	Division 2 (2)	42	22	5	15	73	38	49	6th	R4	R4	County Cup	SF	Alan Woodward	22
1970–71	Division 2 (2)	42	21	14	7	73	39	56	2nd	R3	R3	Watney Cup	SF	Alan Woodward	17
1971–72	Division 1 (1)	42	17	12	13	61	60	46	10th	R3	QF			Alan Woodward	20
1972–73	Division 1 (1)	42	15	10	17	51	59	40	14th	R4	R4	Texaco Cup Watney Cup County Cup	R1 RU RU	Bill Dearden	25
1973–74	Division 1 (1)	42	14	12	16	44	49	40	13th	R3	R2	Texaco Cup County Cup	R1 W	Alan Woodward	18
1974–75	Division 1 (1)	42	18	13	11	58	51	49	6th	R4	R4	Texaco Cup County Cup	GS RU	Alan Woodward	16
1975–76	Division 1 (1)	42	6	10	26	33	82	22	22nd	R3	R3	Anglo-Scottish Cup County Cup	GS RU	Chris Guthrie	15
1976–77	Division 2 (2)	42	14	12	16	54	63	40	11th	R3	R2	Anglo-Scottish Cup County Cup	GS RU	Keith Edwards	18
1977–78	Division 2 (2)	42	16	8	18	62	73	40	12th	R3	R2	Anglo-Scottish Cup County Cup	GS W	Keith Edwards	15
1978–79	Division 2 (2)	42	11	12	19	52	69	34	20th	R3	R3	Anglo-Scottish Cup	GS	Peter Anderson	12
1979–80	Division 3 (3)	46	18	10	18	60	66	46	12th	R2	R1	Anglo-Scottish Cup County Cup	SF W	Jeff Bourne	11
1980–81	Division 3 (3)	46	14	12	20	65	63	40	21st	R2	R1	Anglo-Scottish Cup County Cup	GS SF	Bob Hatton	23
1981–82	Division 4 (4)	46	27	15	4	94	41	96 (Note: The 1981–82 season saw the introduction of three points for a win.)	1st (Note: Won the Fourth Division, but as it was Sheffield United's only season in the fourth tier, it's officially the club's lowest league finish.)	R1	R2	Football League Group Cup County Cup	GS W	Keith Edwards	36
1982–83	Division 3 (3)	46	19	7	20	62	64	64	11th	R3	R3	Football League Trophy	GS	Keith Edwards	24
1983–84	Division 3 (3)	46	24	11	11	86	53	83	3rd	R3	R2	Associate Members' Cup	NSF	Keith Edwards	41
1984–85	Division 2 (2)	42	10	14	18	54	66	44	18th	R3	R2			Keith Edwards	15
1985–86	Division 2 (2)	42	17	11	14	64	63	62	7th	R4	R2	Full Members' Cup	GS	Keith Edwards	21
1986–87	Division 2 (2)	42	15	13	14	50	49	58	9th	R4	R3	Full Members' Cup	R2	Steve Foley	12
1987–88	Division 2 (2)	44	13	7	24	45	74	46	21st	R4	R2	Play-offs Full Members' Cup	SF R1	Tony Philliskirk	11
1988–89	Division 3 (3)	46	25	9	12	93	54	84	2nd	R5	R3	Associate Members' Cup Yorkshire & Humberside Cup	NR1 W	Tony Agana	31
1989–90	Division 2 (2)	46	24	13	9	78	58	85	2nd	QF	R1	Full Members' Cup Yorkshire & Humberside Cup	NR2 GS	Brian Deane	24
1990–91	Division 1 (1)	38	13	7	18	36	55	46	13th	R3	R4	Full Members' Cup	NQF	Brian Deane	17
1991–92	Division 1 (1)	42	16	9	17	65	63	57	9th	R5	R3	Full Members' Cup	NR2	Brian Deane	16
1992–93	Premier League (Note: The 1992–93 season saw the introduction of the Premier League, so Division 1 replaced Division 2, Division 2 replaced Division 3 and Division 3 replaced Division 4.) (1)	42	14	10	18	54	53	52	14th	SF	R3			Brian Deane	19
1993–94	Premier League (1)	42	8	18	16	42	60	42	20th	R3	R2			Jostein Flo	9
1994–95	Division 1 (2)	46	17	17	12	74	55	68	8th	R3	R3	Anglo-Italian Cup	GS	Nathan Blake	18
1995–96	Division 1 (2)	46	16	14	16	57	54	62	9th	R4	R2			Nathan Blake	12
1996–97	Division 1 (2)	46	20	13	13	75	52	73	5th	R3	R2	Play-offs	RU	Andy Walker	15
1997–98	Division 1 (2)	46	19	17	10	69	54	74	6th	SF	R3	Play-offs	SF	Brian Deane	13
1998–99	Division 1 (2)	46	18	13	15	71	66	67	8th	R5	R2			Marcelo	20
1999–2000	Division 1 (2)	46	13	15	18	59	71	54	16th	R4	R2			Marcus Bent	16
2000–01	Division 1 (2)	46	19	11	16	52	49	68	10th	R3	R3			Marcus Bent Paul Devlin David Kelly	8
2001–02	Division 1 (2)	46	15	15	16	53	54	60	13th	R4	R2			Carl Asaba	7
2002–03	Division 1 (2)	46	23	11	12	72	52	80	3rd	SF	SF	Play-offs	RU	Michael Brown	22
2003–04	Division 1 (2)	46	20	11	15	65	56	71	8th	QF	R2			Jack Lester	15
2004–05	Championship (Note: The 2004–05 season saw the rebranding of Divisions 1–3, so Division 1 became the Championship, Division 2 became League One and Division 3 became League Two.) (2)	46	18	13	15	57	56	67	8th	R5	R3			Andy Gray	18
2005–06	Championship (2)	46	26	12	8	76	46	90	2nd	R3	R3			Neil Shipperley	11
2006–07	Premier League (1)	38	10	8	20	32	55	38	18th	R3	R3			Rob Hulse	8
2007–08	Championship (2)	46	17	15	14	56	51	66	9th	R5	R4			James Beattie	22
2008–09	Championship (2)	46	22	14	10	64	39	80	3rd	R5	R3	Play-offs	RU	James Beattie	12
2009–10	Championship (2)	46	17	14	15	62	55	65	8th	R4	R1			Richard Cresswell	14
2010–11	Championship (2)	46	11	9	26	44	79	42	23rd	R3	R1			Ched Evans	9
2011–12	League One (3)	46	27	9	10	92	51	90	3rd	R4	R2	Football League Trophy Play-offs	NQF RU	Ched Evans	35
2012–13	League One (3)	46	19	18	9	56	42	75	5th	R4	R1	Football League Trophy Play-offs	NQF SF	Nick Blackman	14
2013–14	League One (3)	46	18	13	15	48	46	67	7th	SF	R1	Football League Trophy	NR2	Chris Porter	11
2014–15	League One (3)	46	19	14	13	66	53	71	5th	R4	SF	Football League Trophy Play-offs	NQF SF	Jose Baxter Marc McNulty	13
2015–16	League One (3)	46	18	12	16	64	59	66	11th	R3	R2	Football League Trophy	NQF	Billy Sharp	21
2016–17	League One (3)	46	30	10	6	92	47	100	1st	R2	R1	EFL Trophy	GS	Billy Sharp	30
2017–18	Championship (2)	46	19	8	15	57	49	65	10th	R5	R2			Leon Clarke	19
2018–19	Championship (2)	46	26	11	9	78	41	89	2nd	R3	R1			Billy Sharp	24
2019–20	Premier League (1)	38	14	12	12	39	39	54	9th	QF	R3			Oli McBurnie Lys Mousset	6
2020–21	Premier League (1)	38	7	2	29	20	63	23	20th	QF	R2			David McGoldrick	9
2021–22	Championship (2)	46	21	12	13	63	45	75	5th	R3	R3	Play-offs	SF	Billy Sharp	15
2022–23	Championship (2)	46	28	7	11	73	39	91	2nd	SF	R1			Oli McBurnie Iliman Ndiaye	15
2023–24	Premier League (1)	38	3	7	28	35	104	16	20th	R4	R2			Ben Brereton Díaz Oli McBurnie	6
2024–25	Championship (2)	46	28	8	10	63	36	90 (Note: Sheffield United were deducted two points for defaulting on payments to other clubs during the 2022–23 and 2023–24 seasons.)	3rd	R3	R2	Play-offs	RU	Tyrese Campbell	11
2025–26	Championship (2)	46	18	6	22	66	66	60	13th	R3	R1			Patrick Bamford	13

== Key ==
- Pld = Matches played
- W = Matches won
- D = Matches drawn
- L = Matches lost
- GF = Goals for
- GA = Goals against
- Pts = Points
- Pos = Final position
- N/A = Not applicable
- GS = Group stage
- R1 = Round 1
- R2 = Round 2
- R3 = Round 3
- R4 = Round 4
- R5 = Round 5
- QF = Quarter-finals
- SF = Semi-finals
- RU = Runners-up
- W = Winners

Winners	Runners-up	Play-offs	Promoted	Relegated

Note: Bold text indicates a competition won. Italics denotes the club is still a participant in that competition for the current season
Note 2: Where fields are left blank, the club did not participate in a competition that season.
