= Sheffield United F.C. league record by opponent =

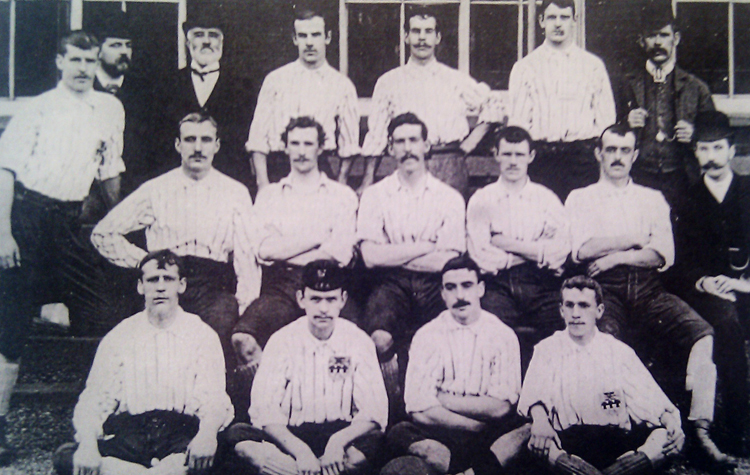
The United squad from the 1890–91 season, their first in league football

Sheffield United Football Club is an English association football club based at Bramall Lane in Sheffield, South Yorkshire, who currently compete in the EFL Championship. Founded in 1889, they played only friendlies during their first year in existence before being elected to the Midland Counties League for the 1890–91 season. The football committee (who ran the club at the time) were unhappy with the quality of the Midland Counties League and so resigned in the summer of 1891. However, United were refused entry into The Football League amidst an acrimonious dispute with local rivals The Wednesday who had lobbied against their application. Instead United joined the newly formed Northern League which mainly consisted of teams from the North East of England, resulting in their nearest away fixture being at Darlington, some 85 miles away. Sheffield United again applied for election to The Football League the following year, this time being successful, and were admitted to the new Second Division in 1892. Despite the club's desire to be part of the Football League some committee members felt it may not last and so United remained with the Northern League for one more season, thus competing in two leagues concurrently during the 1892–93 season. Since that time United have remained in either the Football League, or at times the Premier League (during the 1992–93, 1993–94 and 2006–07 seasons), although changing fortunes have meant that they have competed in all four of the top divisions in England at some stage.

Sheffield United played their inaugural league fixture as part of the Midland Counties League on 13 September 1890 against the now defunct Burton Wanderers. Since that game they have faced 115 different sides in league football with their most regular opponent having been Blackburn Rovers, against whom United have played on 142 occasions since their first meeting on 15 January 1894. As such United have registered more wins against the Lancashire side than any other, triumphing on 55 occasions. The most league defeats suffered by United have come against West Midlands team Aston Villa who have beaten them on 59 occasions, while the most draws have been registered against cross-city rivals Sheffield Wednesday with whom they have shared the points in 39 games. The most recent new league opponents for Sheffield United have been AFC Wimbledon, who they first met on 10 September 2016 in a League One fixture.

== Key ==
- The records include the results of matches played in the Midland Counties League (from 1890 to 1891), Northern League (from 1891 to 1893), the Premier League (from 1992 to 1994 and 2006 to 2007) and The Football League (all other seasons). Wartime matches are regarded as unofficial and are excluded, as are matches from the abandoned 1939–40 season. Test Matches and play-off games are also not included.
- For simplicity, clubs are listed under their name at the time of their last league fixture with United: for example, results against Ardwick are integrated into the records against Manchester City whilst the fixtures against Glossop are listed under the name the club had at the time rather than Glossop North End which they have subsequently become.
- † Teams with this background and symbol in the "Club" column are current divisional rivals of Sheffield United.
- ‡ Clubs with this background and symbol in the "Club" column are defunct.
- P = matches played; W = matches won; D = matches drawn; L = matches lost; F = Goals scored; A = Goals conceded; Win% = percentage of total matches won; First = Date of first league fixture; Last = Date of most recent league fixture

== All-time league record ==
Sheffield United's first team has competed in a number of nationally contested leagues, and its record against each club faced in these competitions is listed below.

Statistics are correct as of 28 January 2024.

Sheffield United F.C. league record by opponent
| Club | P | W | D | L | P | W | D | L | P | W | D | L | F | A | Win% | First | Last | Notes and refs |
| Club | Home | | | | Away | | | | Total | | | | | | Win% | First | Last | Notes and refs |
|---|---|---|---|---|---|---|---|---|---|---|---|---|---|---|---|---|---|---|
| AFC Wimbledon | 1 | 1 | 0 | 0 | 1 | 1 | 0 | 0 | 2 | 2 | 0 | 0 | 7 | 2 | 100% | 10 September 2016 | 4 February 2017 | |
| Aldershot ‡ | 2 | 2 | 0 | 0 | 2 | 0 | 1 | 2 | 4 | 2 | 1 | 1 | 4 | 2 | 50% | 5 December 1981 | 1 May 1989 | |
| Arsenal | 49 | 26 | 14 | 9 | 50 | 9 | 9 | 32 | 99 | 35 | 23 | 40 | 153 | 186 | 35% | 24 December 1904 | 28 October 2023 | (Note: Includes matches against Woolwich Arsenal, the name of the club until 1914.) |
| Aston Villa † | 65 | 30 | 17 | 18 | 65 | 8 | 16 | 42 | 131 | 38 | 33 | 60 | 181 | 244 | 29% | 2 October 1893 | 22 December 2023 | |
| Barnsley | 33 | 17 | 10 | 6 | 33 | 11 | 12 | 10 | 66 | 28 | 22 | 16 | 105 | 70 | 42% | 26 December 1934 | 19 March 2022 | |
| Birmingham City | 53 | 30 | 11 | 12 | 53 | 14 | 10 | 29 | 106 | 44 | 21 | 41 | 164 | 158 | 42% | 3 December 1892 | 8 May 2023 | (Note: Includes matches against Small Heath, the name of the club until 1904.) |
| Blackburn Rovers | 73 | 36 | 21 | 16 | 73 | 21 | 14 | 38 | 146 | 57 | 35 | 54 | 233 | 211 | 39% | 15 January 1894 | 4 March 2023 | |
| Blackpool | 32 | 17 | 8 | 7 | 32 | 10 | 9 | 13 | 64 | 27 | 17 | 20 | 104 | 91 | 42% | 25 December 1930 | 29 December 2022 | |
| Bolton Wanderers | 57 | 35 | 10 | 12 | 57 | 10 | 12 | 35 | 114 | 45 | 22 | 47 | 193 | 187 | 39% | 23 September 1893 | 2 February 2019 | |
| Bootle ‡ | 1 | 1 | 0 | 0 | 1 | 0 | 0 | 1 | 2 | 1 | 0 | 1 | 8 | 5 | 50% | 10 September 1892 | 26 November 1892 | |
| Bournemouth † | 10 | 5 | 3 | 2 | 9 | 5 | 3 | 1 | 19 | 10 | 6 | 3 | 26 | 16 | 53% | 28 November 1981 | 25 November 2023 | |
| Bradford City | 30 | 16 | 10 | 4 | 30 | 11 | 7 | 12 | 60 | 27 | 17 | 16 | 112 | 78 | 45% | 3 October 1908 | 17 April 2017 | |
| Bradford Park Avenue | 9 | 8 | 1 | 0 | 9 | 3 | 2 | 4 | 18 | 11 | 3 | 4 | 37 | 24 | 61% | 28 November 1914 | 11 March 1950 | |
| Brentford† | 17 | 7 | 6 | 4 | 16 | 5 | 3 | 8 | 33 | 12 | 9 | 12 | 50 | 46 | 36% | 22 December 1934 | 9 December 2023 | |
| Brighton & Hove Albion † | 14 | 9 | 2 | 3 | 15 | 4 | 6 | 5 | 29 | 13 | 7 | 8 | 42 | 31 | 45% | 30 March 1959 | 12 November 2023 | |
| Bristol City | 25 | 17 | 3 | 5 | 25 | 10 | 6 | 9 | 50 | 27 | 9 | 14 | 90 | 65 | 54% | 24 December 1906 | 18 April 2023 | |
| Bristol Rovers | 12 | 7 | 3 | 2 | 12 | 0 | 5 | 7 | 24 | 7 | 8 | 9 | 38 | 37 | 29% | 6 October 1956 | 14 February 2017 | |
| Burnley † | 57 | 35 | 17 | 5 | 58 | 12 | 11 | 35 | 115 | 47 | 28 | 39 | 177 | 164 | 41% | 25 December 1893 | 2 December 2023 | |
| Burton Albion | 2 | 1 | 0 | 1 | 2 | 1 | 1 | 0 | 4 | 2 | 1 | 1 | 5 | 2 | 50% | 29 September 2015 | 13 March 2018 | |
| Burton Swifts ‡ | 1 | 1 | 0 | 0 | 1 | 1 | 0 | 0 | 2 | 2 | 0 | 0 | 6 | 1 | 100% | 6 February 1893 | 1 April 1893 | |
| Burton Wanderers ‡ | 1 | 0 | 1 | 0 | 1 | 0 | 1 | 0 | 2 | 0 | 2 | 0 | 3 | 3 | 0% | 13 September 1890 | 23 March 1891 | |
| Bury | 42 | 27 | 11 | 4 | 42 | 16 | 8 | 18 | 84 | 43 | 19 | 22 | 172 | 107 | 51% | 21 September 1895 | 2 January 2017 | |
| Cambridge United | 1 | 0 | 1 | 0 | 1 | 0 | 0 | 1 | 2 | 0 | 1 | 1 | 3 | 4 | 0% | 30 December 1978 | 5 May 1979 | |
| Cardiff City | 37 | 19 | 8 | 9 | 37 | 9 | 12 | 16 | 74 | 29 | 20 | 25 | 95 | 96 | 39% | 11 March 1921 | 15 April 2023 | |
| Carlisle United | 12 | 6 | 4 | 2 | 12 | 5 | 1 | 6 | 24 | 11 | 5 | 8 | 26 | 21 | 46% | 9 November 1968 | 11 March 2014 | |
| Charlton Athletic | 30 | 19 | 6 | 5 | 30 | 5 | 9 | 16 | 60 | 24 | 15 | 21 | 92 | 78 | 40% | 16 November 1935 | 18 March 2017 | |
| Chelsea † | 39 | 20 | 5 | 14 | 40 | 7 | 11 | 22 | 79 | 27 | 16 | 35 | 110 | 132 | 34% | 7 September 1907 | 16 December 2023 | |
| Chester City ‡ | 3 | 2 | 1 | 0 | 3 | 1 | 1 | 1 | 6 | 3 | 2 | 1 | 13 | 6 | 50% | 25 August 1979 | 19 April 1989 | |
| Chesterfield | 13 | 8 | 2 | 3 | 13 | 5 | 1 | 7 | 26 | 13 | 3 | 10 | 45 | 30 | 50% | 7 November 1936 | 30 April 2017 | |
| Colchester United | 9 | 5 | 2 | 2 | 9 | 3 | 4 | 2 | 18 | 8 | 6 | 4 | 33 | 24 | 44% | 21 August 1979 | 16 January 2016 | |
| Coventry City | 32 | 14 | 10 | 8 | 32 | 9 | 8 | 15 | 64 | 23 | 18 | 23 | 78 | 79 | 36% | 28 November 1936 | 26 December 2022 | |
| Crawley Town | 3 | 1 | 1 | 1 | 3 | 2 | 1 | 0 | 6 | 3 | 2 | 1 | 7 | 4 | 50% | 22 December 2012 | 28 February 2015 | |
| Crewe Alexandra | 14 | 10 | 3 | 1 | 14 | 7 | 1 | 6 | 28 | 17 | 4 | 7 | 51 | 27 | 63% | 18 March 1893 | 25 March 2016 | |
| Crystal Palace † | 28 | 11 | 6 | 11 | 27 | 9 | 6 | 12 | 55 | 20 | 12 | 23 | 55 | 64 | 36% | 5 October 1968 | 12 August 2023 | |
| Darlington | 3 | 2 | 1 | 0 | 3 | 1 | 1 | 1 | 6 | 3 | 2 | 1 | 16 | 7 | 50% | 26 September 1891 | 15 May 1982 | |
| Darwen | 2 | 2 | 0 | 0 | 2 | 0 | 1 | 1 | 4 | 2 | 1 | 1 | 8 | 7 | 50% | 15 October 1892 | 6 January 1894 | |
| Derby County | 53 | 32 | 9 | 12 | 53 | 13 | 7 | 33 | 106 | 45 | 16 | 45 | 155 | 167 | 42% | 4 September 1893 | 15 January 2022 | |
| Derby Junction ‡ | 1 | 1 | 0 | 0 | 1 | 1 | 0 | 0 | 2 | 2 | 0 | 0 | 5 | 1 | 100% | 25 December 1890 | 28 February 1891 | |
| Derby Midland ‡ | 1 | 0 | 0 | 1 | 1 | 1 | 0 | 0 | 2 | 1 | 0 | 1 | 5 | 3 | 50% | 20 December 1890 | 21 February 1891 | |
| Doncaster Rovers | 14 | 8 | 5 | 1 | 14 | 4 | 6 | 4 | 28 | 12 | 11 | 5 | 43 | 26 | 43% | 1 January 1936 | 13 February 2016 | |
| Everton † | 63 | 26 | 22 | 15 | 62 | 18 | 9 | 35 | 125 | 44 | 31 | 50 | 158 | 187 | 35% | 2 September 1893 | 2 September 2023 | |
| Exeter City | 5 | 3 | 2 | 0 | 5 | 2 | 2 | 1 | 10 | 5 | 4 | 1 | 24 | 15 | 50% | 1 September 1979 | 5 May 2012 | |
| Fleetwood Town | 3 | 1 | 0 | 2 | 3 | 0 | 3 | 0 | 6 | 1 | 3 | 2 | 8 | 8 | 17% | 13 December 2014 | 24 January 2017 | |
| Fulham † | 30 | 17 | 7 | 6 | 31 | 8 | 6 | 17 | 61 | 25 | 13 | 23 | 81 | 96 | 41% | 19 April 1935 | 7 October 2023 | |
| Gainsborough Trinity | 1 | 1 | 0 | 0 | 1 | 0 | 0 | 1 | 2 | 1 | 0 | 1 | 3 | 5 | 50% | 8 November 1890 | 7 March 1891 | |
| Gillingham | 14 | 4 | 6 | 4 | 14 | 6 | 2 | 6 | 28 | 10 | 8 | 10 | 39 | 38 | 36% | 10 November 1979 | 21 January 2017 | |
| Glossop | 1 | 1 | 0 | 0 | 1 | 0 | 1 | 0 | 2 | 1 | 1 | 0 | 6 | 2 | 50% | 2 December 1899 | 7 April 1900 | |
| Grimsby Town | 25 | 16 | 5 | 4 | 25 | 15 | 3 | 7 | 50 | 31 | 8 | 11 | 94 | 60 | 62% | 27 September 1892 | 4 March 2003 | |
| Halifax Town ‡ | 1 | 0 | 1 | 0 | 1 | 1 | 0 | 0 | 2 | 1 | 1 | 0 | 7 | 3 | 50% | 2 January 1982 | 12 April 1982 | |
| Hartlepool United | 3 | 1 | 1 | 1 | 3 | 3 | 0 | 0 | 6 | 4 | 1 | 1 | 12 | 8 | 67% | 17 October 1981 | 29 December 2012 | |
| Hereford United | 2 | 0 | 2 | 0 | 2 | 0 | 2 | 0 | 4 | 0 | 4 | 0 | 6 | 6 | 0% | 28 August 1976 | 17 February 1982 | |
| Huddersfield Town | 45 | 13 | 15 | 17 | 45 | 11 | 15 | 19 | 90 | 24 | 30 | 36 | 105 | 130 | 27% | 29 December 1920 | 4 May 2023 | |
| Hull City | 27 | 16 | 7 | 4 | 27 | 11 | 10 | 6 | 54 | 27 | 17 | 10 | 105 | 57 | 50% | 8 December 1934 | 21 January 2023 | |
| Ipswich Town | 32 | 15 | 9 | 8 | 32 | 4 | 14 | 14 | 64 | 19 | 23 | 22 | 80 | 82 | 30% | 7 April 1958 | 27 April 2019 | |
| Leeds United | 38 | 16 | 12 | 10 | 38 | 9 | 10 | 19 | 76 | 25 | 22 | 29 | 97 | 115 | 33% | 8 November 1924 | 3 April 2021 | |
| Leicester City | 44 | 18 | 13 | 13 | 44 | 10 | 17 | 17 | 88 | 28 | 30 | 30 | 139 | 139 | 32% | 24 October 1908 | 14 March 2021 | (Note: Includes matches against Leicester Fosse, the name of the club until 1919.) |
| Leyton Orient | 16 | 7 | 4 | 5 | 16 | 4 | 7 | 5 | 32 | 12 | 11 | 9 | 53 | 44 | 38% | 27 October 1956 | 25 April 2015 | (Note: Includes matches against Clapton Orient, the name of the club until 1946, and against Orient which they were referred to as between 1967 and 1987.) |
| Lincoln City | 10 | 8 | 1 | 1 | 10 | 3 | 1 | 6 | 20 | 11 | 2 | 7 | 44 | 27 | 55% | 18 October 1890 | 7 February 1984 | |
| Liverpool † | 62 | 27 | 15 | 20 | 61 | 9 | 12 | 40 | 123 | 36 | 27 | 60 | 136 | 202 | 29% | 6 October 1894 | 6 December 2023 | |
| Long Eaton Rangers ‡ | 1 | 0 | 0 | 1 | 1 | 1 | 0 | 0 | 2 | 1 | 0 | 1 | 3 | 3 | 50% | 27 September 1890 | 28 March 1891 | |
| Luton Town† | 21 | 10 | 6 | 5 | 20 | 6 | 5 | 9 | 41 | 16 | 11 | 14 | 61 | 58 | 39% | 11 September 1937 | 26 December 2023 | |
| Manchester City † | 58 | 20 | 19 | 19 | 58 | 13 | 13 | 32 | 116 | 33 | 32 | 51 | 168 | 196 | 28% | 4 March 1893 | 30 December 2023 | (Note: Includes matches against Ardwick, the name of the club until 1894.) |
| Manchester United † | 47 | 22 | 10 | 15 | 46 | 12 | 6 | 28 | 93 | 34 | 16 | 43 | 133 | 156 | 37% | 25 November 1893 | 21 October 2023 | (Note: Includes results against Newton Heath, the name of the club until 1902.) |
| Mansfield Town | 4 | 3 | 0 | 1 | 4 | 2 | 2 | 0 | 8 | 5 | 2 | 1 | 15 | 8 | 63% | 8 October 1977 | 25 April 1988 | |
| Middlesbrough | 54 | 31 | 10 | 13 | 54 | 14 | 11 | 29 | 108 | 45 | 21 | 42 | 151 | 165 | 42% | 17 October 1891 | 15 February 2023 | |
| Middlesbrough Ironopolis ‡ | 2 | 0 | 2 | 0 | 2 | 0 | 0 | 2 | 4 | 0 | 2 | 2 | 3 | 5 | 0% | 2 April 1892 | 29 October 1893 | |
| Millwall | 28 | 13 | 7 | 8 | 28 | 9 | 3 | 16 | 56 | 22 | 10 | 24 | 75 | 74 | 39% | 15 October 1938 | 18 February 2023 | |
| Milton Keynes Dons | 5 | 2 | 1 | 2 | 5 | 2 | 0 | 3 | 10 | 4 | 1 | 5 | 8 | 7 | 40% | 25 October 2011 | 22 April 2017 | (Note: Wimbledon Football Club was moved by its owners to Milton Keynes in 2004 and re-formed as Milton Keynes Dons which is now considered a separate club.) |
| Newcastle United † | 60 | 37 | 13 | 10 | 59 | 11 | 14 | 34 | 119 | 48 | 27 | 43 | 173 | 176 | 40% | 19 December 1891 | 24 September 2023 | (Note: Includes fixtures against Newcastle East End and Newcastle West End who merged to form Newcastle United. The noted first league fixture was against their West End incarnation.) |
| Newport County | 3 | 3 | 0 | 0 | 3 | 1 | 0 | 2 | 6 | 4 | 0 | 2 | 9 | 7 | 67% | 14 October 1980 | 12 May 1984 | |
| Northampton Town | 4 | 3 | 1 | 0 | 4 | 4 | 0 | 0 | 8 | 7 | 1 | 0 | 21 | 8 | 88% | 9 October 1965 | 8 April 2017 | |
| Northwich Victoria | 1 | 0 | 1 | 0 | 1 | 1 | 0 | 0 | 2 | 1 | 1 | 0 | 4 | 2 | 50% | 23 January 1893 | 18 February 1893 | |
| Norwich City | 34 | 18 | 7 | 9 | 34 | 8 | 10 | 16 | 68 | 26 | 17 | 25 | 86 | 88 | 39% | 3 November 1934 | 1 April 2023 | |
| Nottingham Forest† | 53 | 22 | 14 | 17 | 54 | 13 | 15 | 26 | 107 | 35 | 29 | 42 | 132 | 154 | 33% | 18 November 1893 | 18 August 2023 | |
| Notts County | 38 | 25 | 6 | 7 | 38 | 17 | 6 | 15 | 76 | 42 | 12 | 22 | 140 | 98 | 55% | 1 January 1898 | 17 February 2015 | |
| Oldham Athletic | 30 | 21 | 6 | 3 | 30 | 10 | 10 | 10 | 60 | 31 | 16 | 13 | 101 | 72 | 52% | 26 December 1910 | 25 May 2017 | |
| Oxford United | 13 | 9 | 1 | 3 | 13 | 4 | 4 | 5 | 26 | 13 | 5 | 8 | 43 | 37 | 46% | 14 September 1968 | 7 March 2017 | |
| Peterborough United | 7 | 5 | 0 | 2 | 7 | 5 | 1 | 1 | 14 | 10 | 1 | 3 | 29 | 10 | 71% | 21 April 1982 | 29 January 2022 | |
| Plymouth Argyle | 22 | 15 | 4 | 3 | 22 | 5 | 6 | 11 | 44 | 20 | 10 | 14 | 52 | 43 | 45% | 27 October 1934 | 27 February 2010 | |
| Portsmouth | 36 | 26 | 4 | 6 | 36 | 11 | 6 | 19 | 72 | 37 | 10 | 25 | 123 | 100 | 51% | 2 January 1927 | 20 April 2013 | |
| Port Vale | 19 | 14 | 4 | 1 | 19 | 9 | 5 | 5 | 38 | 23 | 9 | 6 | 84 | 36 | 59% | 27 October 1890 | 14 April 2017 | (Note: Includes fixtures played against Burslem Port Vale, the name of the club until 1907.) |
| Preston North End | 55 | 36 | 11 | 8 | 55 | 13 | 18 | 25 | 110 | 49 | 29 | 33 | 164 | 144 | 45% | 20 November 1893 | 29 April 2023 | |
| Queens Park Rangers | 27 | 10 | 12 | 5 | 27 | 7 | 7 | 13 | 54 | 17 | 19 | 18 | 66 | 75 | 31% | 1 October 1949 | 2 January 2023 | |
| Reading | 22 | 10 | 6 | 6 | 22 | 11 | 1 | 10 | 44 | 21 | 7 | 16 | 67 | 44 | 48% | 13 October 1979 | 7 March 2023 | |
| Rochdale | 5 | 4 | 1 | 0 | 5 | 3 | 1 | 1 | 10 | 7 | 2 | 1 | 22 | 12 | 70% | 16 January 1982 | 4 March 2017 | |
| Rotherham Town ‡ | 1 | 1 | 0 | 0 | 1 | 0 | 0 | 1 | 2 | 1 | 0 | 1 | 3 | 1 | 50% | 20 September 1890 | 27 March 1891 | |
| Rotherham United | 17 | 11 | 1 | 5 | 17 | 7 | 7 | 3 | 34 | 18 | 8 | 8 | 60 | 40 | 53% | 13 October 1951 | 4 February 2023 | |
| Scunthorpe United | 13 | 8 | 2 | 3 | 13 | 2 | 7 | 4 | 26 | 10 | 9 | 7 | 42 | 34 | 38% | 11 October 1958 | 18 February 2017 | |
| Sheffield Wednesday | 59 | 25 | 23 | 11 | 59 | 18 | 16 | 25 | 118 | 43 | 39 | 36 | 161 | 149 | 36% | 16 October 1893 | 4 March 2019 | (Note: Includes matches against The Wednesday, the name of the club until 1929.) |
| Shrewsbury Town | 8 | 3 | 2 | 3 | 8 | 3 | 1 | 4 | 16 | 6 | 3 | 7 | 20 | 22 | 38% | 24 November 1984 | 19 November 2016 | |
| South Bank ‡ | 1 | 1 | 0 | 0 | 1 | 1 | 0 | 0 | 2 | 2 | 0 | 0 | 11 | 0 | 100% | 10 October 1891 | 28 November 1891 | |
| Southampton | 26 | 15 | 5 | 6 | 26 | 7 | 7 | 12 | 52 | 22 | 12 | 18 | 96 | 79 | 42% | 6 October 1934 | 6 March 2021 | |
| Southend United | 9 | 5 | 1 | 3 | 9 | 3 | 0 | 11 | 18 | 8 | 1 | 9 | 33 | 26 | 44% | 21 December 1979 | 7 January 2017 | |
| Staveley ‡ | 1 | 1 | 0 | 0 | 1 | 0 | 0 | 1 | 2 | 1 | 0 | 1 | 5 | 1 | 50% | 10 February 1891 | 4 April 1891 | |
| Stevenage | 3 | 2 | 1 | 0 | 3 | 0 | 1 | 2 | 6 | 2 | 2 | 2 | 8 | 9 | 33% | 5 November 2011 | 18 April 2014 | |
| Stockport County | 7 | 6 | 1 | 0 | 7 | 2 | 2 | 3 | 14 | 8 | 3 | 3 | 23 | 8 | 57% | 25 September 1937 | 2 March 2002 | |
| Stockton ‡ | 2 | 1 | 0 | 1 | 2 | 0 | 1 | 1 | 4 | 1 | 1 | 2 | 8 | 9 | 25% | 29 December 1891 | 30 January 1893 | |
| Stoke City | 52 | 26 | 15 | 11 | 52 | 15 | 14 | 23 | 104 | 41 | 29 | 34 | 146 | 151 | 39% | 16 December 1893 | 21 January 2023 | |
| Sunderland | 65 | 38 | 10 | 17 | 65 | 11 | 14 | 40 | 130 | 49 | 24 | 57 | 192 | 214 | 38% | 7 October 1893 | 15 March 2023 | |
| Sunderland Albion ‡ | 1 | 1 | 0 | 0 | 1 | 1 | 0 | 0 | 2 | 2 | 0 | 0 | 6 | 2 | 100% | 12 September 1891 | 11 April 1892 | |
| Swansea City | 21 | 13 | 6 | 2 | 21 | 8 | 4 | 9 | 42 | 21 | 10 | 11 | 83 | 50 | 50% | 8 September 1934 | 11 February 2023 | |
| Swindon Town | 17 | 13 | 3 | 1 | 17 | 4 | 5 | 8 | 34 | 17 | 8 | 9 | 59 | 34 | 50% | 11 October 1969 | 14 March 2017 | |
| Torquay United | 1 | 1 | 0 | 0 | 1 | 0 | 1 | 0 | 2 | 1 | 1 | 0 | 5 | 2 | 50% | 14 November 1981 | 3 April 1982 | |
| Tottenham Hotspur † | 43 | 22 | 14 | 7 | 44 | 5 | 11 | 28 | 87 | 27 | 25 | 34 | 143 | 162 | 31% | 27 November 1909 | 16 September 2023 | |
| Tranmere Rovers | 12 | 7 | 4 | 1 | 12 | 4 | 6 | 2 | 24 | 11 | 10 | 3 | 37 | 22 | 46% | 19 November 1938 | 21 April 2014 | |
| Walsall | 14 | 7 | 4 | 3 | 14 | 4 | 6 | 4 | 28 | 11 | 10 | 7 | 39 | 31 | 39% | 7 January 1893 | 14 January 2017 | (Note: Includes fixtures against Walsall Town Swifts, the name of the club until 1896.) |
| Watford | 19 | 8 | 6 | 5 | 19 | 7 | 5 | 7 | 38 | 15 | 11 | 12 | 47 | 40 | 39% | 30 August 1969 | 25 February 2023 | |
| West Bromwich Albion | 56 | 27 | 15 | 14 | 56 | 18 | 10 | 28 | 112 | 45 | 25 | 42 | 149 | 147 | 40% | 28 October 1893 | 26 April 2023 | |
| West Ham United † | 42 | 23 | 9 | 10 | 42 | 11 | 11 | 20 | 84 | 34 | 20 | 30 | 136 | 135 | 40% | 1 January 1924 | 21 January 2024 | |
| Wigan Athletic | 10 | 5 | 2 | 3 | 10 | 5 | 2 | 3 | 20 | 10 | 4 | 6 | 29 | 28 | 50% | 5 September 1981 | 7 April 2023 | |
| Wimbledon ‡ | 12 | 5 | 3 | 4 | 12 | 1 | 4 | 7 | 24 | 6 | 7 | 11 | 24 | 37 | 25% | 8 December 1979 | 12 April 2004 | |
| Wolverhampton Wanderers † | 53 | 27 | 16 | 10 | 52 | 10 | 18 | 24 | 105 | 37 | 34 | 34 | 161 | 170 | 35% | 30 September 1893 | 4 November 2023 | |
| Wrexham | 2 | 1 | 1 | 0 | 2 | 0 | 0 | 2 | 4 | 1 | 1 | 2 | 4 | 9 | 25% | 28 February 1979 | 26 February 1983 | |
| Wycombe Wanderers | 1 | 1 | 0 | 0 | 1 | 0 | 0 | 1 | 2 | 1 | 0 | 1 | 3 | 1 | 50% | 24 September 2011 | 11 February 2012 | |
| Yeovil Town | 3 | 2 | 0 | 1 | 3 | 2 | 0 | 1 | 6 | 4 | 0 | 2 | 8 | 3 | 67% | 27 August 2011 | 14 April 2015 | |
| York City | 1 | 1 | 0 | 0 | 1 | 1 | 0 | 0 | 2 | 2 | 0 | 0 | 8 | 3 | 100% | 3 October 1981 | 13 February 1982 | |
