= Len Badger =

English footballer (1945–2021)

Personal information
- Full name: Leonard Badger
- Date of birth: 8 June 1945
- Place of birth: Darnall, Sheffield, England
- Date of death: 20 May 2021 (aged 75)
- Height: 5 ft 8 in (1.73 m)
- Position: Right-back

Senior career*
| Years | Team | Apps | (Gls) |
| 1962–1976 | Sheffield United | 458 | (7) |
| 1976–1978 | Chesterfield | 46 | (0) |
| Total | | 504 | (7) |

International career
| | England U18 | 7 | (0) |
| 1964–1968 | England U23 | 13 | (0) |
- * Club domestic league appearances and goals

Leonard Badger (8 June 1945 – 20 May 2021) was an English footballer who played as a right-back. He spent the majority of his career at Sheffield United before moving on to a shorter spell at Chesterfield where he finished his career.

== Early life ==
Badger was born in the Darnall area of Sheffield on 8 June 1945. He played school football for both Sheffield Boys and England Schoolboys. He progressed through the junior ranks at Sheffield United and signed his first professional contract in August 1962.

== Professional career ==
=== Sheffield United ===
Badger made his league debut for the Blades first team against Leyton Orient at Bramall Lane on 26 April 1963. By the end of the 1963–64 season he established himself as first choice at right-back, replacing club stalwart Cec Coldwell and remained a regular there until 1975. He was appointed captain in 1968 by manager John Harris. This made him the youngest league captain in United history, and one of the youngest skippers in the league at the time. He served as captain for two years before relinquishing the role to Eddie Colquhoun. Badger's left-back colleagues of the early and mid-sixties included Graham Shaw and Bernard Shaw, but it was the arrival of Ted Hemsley in 1968 that provided him with his most fruitful partnership which continued through one of United's most successful post war periods from 1969 to 1972.

Badger's attacking instincts, along with those of Hemsley, showed well as United narrowly failed to win promotion in the 1969–70 season. Badger was an ever present in the Division Two promotion winning side of the 1970–71 season. Although he did not score a goal in that particular season, he was best remembered for buccaneering runs, crosses from the right-wing and for his occasional thunderous shot from 25 yards or more.

In his time with United Badger made 458 league appearances with seven goals.

=== Chesterfield ===
Badger left Bramall Lane soon after the arrival of new Blades manager Jimmy Sirrel, being sold to Chesterfield on 1 January 1976. He played for a further two seasons for the Spireites making 46 appearances before a series of knee injuries ended his career.

== International career ==
Badger played seven times for England Youths, thirteen times for England U23s and for the Football League side. He faced competition for a place on the England team from George Cohen and Keith Newton.

== Later life ==
After retiring from football, Badger became a publican in the Chesterfield area. He also served as a matchday host with Sheffield United.

Badger died on 20 May 2021. He was 75, and had undergone a complicated surgical procedure.

== Career statistics ==
Appearances and goals by club, season and competition
| Club | Season | League | | | FA Cup | | League Cup | | Other | | Total | |
| Club | Season | Division | Apps | Goals | Apps | Goals | Apps | Goals | Apps | Goals | Apps | Goals |
|---|---|---|---|---|---|---|---|---|---|---|---|---|
| Sheffield United | 1962–63 | Division One | 1 | 0 | 0 | 0 | 1 | 0 | — | | 2 | 0 |
| Sheffield United | 1963–64 | Division One | 7 | 0 | 1 | 0 | 1 | 0 | 1 (Note: Appearances in Sheffield & Hallamshire County Cup) | 0 | 10 | 0 |
| Sheffield United | 1964–65 | Division One | 36 | 0 | 3 | 0 | 1 | 0 | 0 | 0 | 40 | 0 |
| Sheffield United | 1965–66 | Division One | 41 | 1 | 2 | 0 | 1 | 0 | 1 | 0 | 45 | 1 |
| Sheffield United | 1966–67 | Division One | 35 | 0 | 4 | 0 | 3 | 0 | 3 | 0 | 45 | 0 |
| Sheffield United | 1967–68 | Division One | 42 | 0 | 4 | 0 | 1 | 0 | 2 | 0 | 49 | 0 |
| Sheffield United | 1968–69 | Division Two | 40 | 2 | 1 | 0 | 1 | 0 | 2 | 0 | 44 | 2 |
| Sheffield United | 1969–70 | Division Two | 42 | 2 | 2 | 0 | 3 | 0 | 2 | 0 | 49 | 2 |
| Sheffield United | 1970–71 | Division Two | 42 | 0 | 1 | 0 | 2 | 0 | 4 (Note: 2 appearances in Sheffield & Hallamshire County Cup, 2 appearances in Watney Cup) | 0 | 49 | 0 |
| Sheffield United | 1971–72 | Division One | 42 | 1 | 1 | 0 | 5 | 0 | — | | 48 | 1 |
| Sheffield United | 1972–73 | Division One | 35 | 0 | 2 | 0 | 5 | 0 | 4 (Note: 1 appearance in Sheffield & Hallamshire County Cup, 2 appearances in Texaco Cup, 1 appearance in Watney Cup) | 0 | 46 | 0 |
| Sheffield United | 1973–74 | Division One | 40 | 0 | 1 | 0 | 1 | 0 | 3 (Note: 2 appearances in Sheffield & Hallamshire County Cup, 1 appearance in Texaco Cup) | 0 | 45 | 0 |
| Sheffield United | 1974–75 | Division One | 37 | 1 | 2 | 0 | 4 | 0 | 3 (Note: 1 appearance in Sheffield & Hallamshire County Cup, 2 appearances in Texaco Cup) | 0 | 46 | 1 |
| Sheffield United | 1975–76 | Division One | 18 | 0 | — | | 1 | 0 | 4 (Note: 1 appearance in Sheffield & Hallamshire County Cup, 3 appearances and 1 goal in Anglo-Scottish Cup) | 1 | 23 | 1 |
| Sheffield United | Total | | 458 | 7 | 24 | 0 | 30 | 0 | 29 | 1 | 541 | 8 |
| Chesterfield | 1975–76 | Division Three | 15 | 0 | 0 | 0 | 0 | 0 | 0 | 0 | 15 | 0 |
| Chesterfield | 1976–77 | Division Three | 25 | 0 | 4 | 0 | 2 | 0 | 0 | 0 | 31 | 0 |
| Chesterfield | 1977–78 | Division Three | 6 | 0 | 1 | 0 | 0 | 0 | 0 | 0 | 7 | 0 |
| Chesterfield | Total | | 46 | 0 | 5 | 0 | 2 | 0 | 0 | 0 | 53 | 0 |
| Career total | | | 504 | 7 | 29 | 0 | 32 | 0 | 29 | 1 | 594 | 8 |
