= Marcus Bent =

English footballer (born 1978)

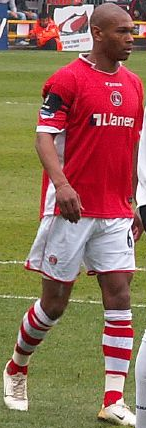
- Bent playing for Charlton Athletic in 2006

Personal information
- Full name: Marcus Nathan Bent
- Date of birth: 19 May 1978 (age 48)
- Place of birth: Hammersmith, London, England
- Height: 1.83 m (6 ft 0 in)
- Position: Forward

Youth career
- –1995: Brentford

Senior career*
Years	Team	Apps	(Gls)
1995–1998	Brentford	70	(8)
1998–1999	Crystal Palace	28	(5)
1999	Port Vale	23	(1)
1999–2000	Sheffield United	48	(20)
2000–2001	Blackburn Rovers	37	(8)
2001–2004	Ipswich Town	61	(21)
2003–2004	→ Leicester City (loan)	33	(9)
2004–2006	Everton	55	(7)
2006–2008	Charlton Athletic	46	(4)
2007–2008	→ Wigan Athletic (loan)	31	(7)
2008–2011	Birmingham City	33	(3)
2009–2010	→ Middlesbrough (loan)	7	(0)
2010	→ Queens Park Rangers (loan)	3	(0)
2010–2011	→ Wolverhampton Wanderers (loan)	3	(0)
2011	→ Sheffield United (loan)	11	(0)
2011–2012	Mitra Kukar	11	(4)
2017–2018	Wick	0	(0)
2020	Cornard United	1	(0)
Total		501	(97)

International career
1998	England U21	2	(1)
- * Club domestic league appearances and goals

Marcus Nathan Bent (born 19 May 1978) is an English retired professional footballer. A former England under-21 international, the journeyman striker played 573 games and scored 113 goals for 14 different clubs. His numerous transfer fees totalled over £10 million.

He began his career at Brentford in 1995 before he signed with Crystal Palace in 1998, where he made his Premier League debut. The next year, he joined Sheffield United via Port Vale. In 2000, he transferred to Blackburn Rovers, before he moved on to Ipswich Town in 2001. He spent 2003–04 on loan at Leicester City before he transferred to Everton in 2004.

Two years later, he was sold to Charlton Athletic. He spent the 2007–08 season on loan at Wigan Athletic before he moved on to Birmingham City in 2008. He spent three years with Birmingham, during which he spent time on loan at Middlesbrough, Queens Park Rangers, Wolverhampton Wanderers, and Sheffield United. After leaving the club, he spent six months in Indonesia with Mitra Kukar. After five years out of the game, during which time he faced legal issues, he then had brief spells in non-League football with Wick and Cornard United.

== Club career ==
=== Brentford ===
Bent graduated through the Brentford youth team ranks, usually playing as a forward. He broke into the first-team at Griffin Park in 1995–96 under manager David Webb, helping the Bees to a 15th-place finish in the Second Division. Bent was almost ever-present in a successful season that saw Brentford reach the play-offs in 1996–97 with a fourth-place finish. He played at Wembley in the play-off final defeat to Crewe Alexandra. He was substituted after 70 minutes for Scott Canham. Bent then scored five goals in 29 games in 1997–98, as the Bees struggled in vain to avoid relegation under Eddie May and then his replacement Micky Adams.

=== Crystal Palace ===
Though not a prolific striker for Brentford, Bent's potential was spotted by Crystal Palace manager Steve Coppell, who brought Bent to Selhurst Park for £300,000 on 8 January 1998. The Eagles were relegated out of the Premier League in last place in 1997–98. However, Bent had shown his ability with five goals in 16 games, including strikes at Stamford Bridge and Anfield. However, he remained goalless in 15 appearances in 1998–99, as Palace struggled under new boss Terry Venables. With the club heading for administration, he was sold to First Division rivals Port Vale for £300,000 on 15 January 1999, as one of long-term manager John Rudge's last purchases.

=== Port Vale ===
Rudge was unable to make the most of his new player, as chairman Bill Bell controversially sacked Rudge and hired Brian Horton. Played out of position on the left wing, Bent went 15 games without a goal for the Valiants in 1998–99. He played nine games in 1999–2000, scoring once against Grimsby Town in a 3–1 win at Vale Park. In October 1999, he was sold to league rivals Sheffield United for £375,000, with Bell eager to cash in on the £75,000 profit. He later described moving from Crystal Palace to Port Vale as "my dream blown up in my face" as he struggled to adapt to life outside London, referring to the culture shock he said "Someone said 'All right, Duck', which put me on my toes. I thought, 'Why are you calling me Duck?'

=== Sheffield United ===
Bent became the Blades top scorer in 1999–2000 with 15 league goals in 32 appearances, including a hat-trick past West Bromwich Albion in a 6–0 thrashing at Bramall Lane on 19 February. The club had struggled under Adrian Heath before finding an upturn in results after Neil Warnock stepped into the hot seat in December. He began the 2000–01 campaign in fine form, hitting a hat-trick past Lincoln City in a 6–1 win in the League Cup. Former club Crystal Palace reportedly targeted him for a swap deal of Clinton Morrison and £1.5 million; however, manager Alan Smith denied that he had made any such offer. He was instead sold to promotion-chasing Blackburn Rovers for £2 million in November 2000; the transfer was seen as good business for both clubs.

=== Blackburn Rovers ===
Bent scored his first goal for Rovers against bitter East Lancashire rivals Burnley in a 2–0 win at Turf Moor on 17 December 2000. He went on to hit 11 goals in 34 appearances in 2000–01, justifying Graeme Souness's fee, as the Ewood Park club won promotion back to the Premier League. He made ten goalless appearances in 2001–02, before he was sold to Ipswich Town for £3 million in November 2001, which was Town's fourth biggest transfer fee behind teammates Matteo Sereni, Hermann Hreiðarsson, and Finidi George.

=== Ipswich Town ===
"His goalscoring form has proved the £3m fee for Bent from Blackburn is money very well spent. It's no coincidence that Ipswich's change in form has followed him signing for them. His speed, pace and eye for goal have tormented some of the Premiership's best defences."

— Bent was named Premier League Player of the Month for January 2002.

Despite Bent scoring nine times in 22 league starts, the Blues were relegated from the Premier League at the end of the 2001–02 season. He stayed at Portman Road for the 2002–03 campaign, hitting 12 goals in 38 games, as the Tractor Boys missed out on the play-offs by one place and four points. However, Ipswich entered administration and were forced to sell talent such as Marcus Stewart, Titus Bramble, and Darren Ambrose; a relegation battle was only avoided after manager George Burley was replaced by Joe Royle. Ipswich then found another striking talent, Darren Bent (no relation). Bent joined newly promoted Premier League side Leicester City on loan for the 2003–04 campaign, in a move that reunited him with manager Micky Adams. Bent scored ten goals in 35 games, though the First Division beckoned for the Foxes, as the Walkers Stadium club finished six points behind 17th place Everton.

=== Everton ===
Unable to afford his £17,000-per-week contract, in June 2004, Ipswich sold Bent to Everton for a fee of £450,000; the Toffees manager David Moyes said that "he's got athleticism, he's quick, good in the air". He became a regular starter at Goodison Park in the lone centre-forward role (supported by Tim Cahill). He only managed seven goals in 2004–05, which were key in securing draws away to Southampton and at home to Aston Villa, as well as decisive goals against Middlesbrough and Manchester City. Despite having helped the club to secure a place in the Champions League, Bent became a more peripheral figure in 2005–06, having lost his first-team place to James Beattie.

=== Charlton Athletic ===
In January 2006, it was announced that Bent had signed for Charlton Athletic in a deal worth £2.3 million. He scored on his debut as a substitute against Premier League champions Chelsea in a 1–1 draw. Bent hit only two goals in 35 games in 2006–07, 13 fewer than strike partner Darren Bent, who had signed with Charlton from Ipswich. The club had collapsed following the departure of manager Alan Curbishley after his 15-year reign, and First Division football returned to The Valley despite the best efforts of Iain Dowie, Les Reed and Alan Pardew.

==== Loan to Wigan Athletic ====
Bent joined Wigan Athletic on Transfer Deadline Day (31 August 2007) on a season-long loan move, one of nine summer signings by boss Chris Hutchings. However, after a poor start to the campaign, Hutchings was replaced by Steve Bruce. Bent scored a hat-trick, his first in the Premier League, against former club Blackburn Rovers in a 5–3 win on 15 December; Roque Santa Cruz also scored a hat-trick in the game, the first time in the Premier League that two opposing players scored hat-tricks in the same match. Despite only hitting seven goals in 32 games, he still became the Latics's top scorer in 2007–08. At the end of the season, Wigan manager Steve Bruce chose not to make the deal permanent, feeling Bent was too similar in style to Emile Heskey; Bent subsequently returned to cash-strapped Charlton, where he was placed on the transfer list.

=== Birmingham City ===
Bent signed a three-year deal for Birmingham City in July 2008 for a fee in excess of £1 million, after rejecting the opportunity to join Cardiff City. He scored three goals from 16 starts and 17 substitute appearances as Alex McLeish got the club promoted to the Premier League with a second-place finish in 2008–09. He did not feature at the higher level for the Blues. Instead, he became Gordon Strachan's first signing for Middlesbrough when he joined on a two-month loan deal on 30 October 2009, later extended to 16 January 2010. He spent the final three months of the 2009–10 season on loan at a second Championship club, Queens Park Rangers, whom he joined in February 2010. Both clubs finished in mid-table, and Bent failed to find the net at either the Riverside Stadium or Loftus Road.

He was still out of the first-team plans at St Andrew's; he again moved on loan in August 2010, as he joined Mick McCarthy's Premier League side Wolverhampton Wanderers until 4 January 2011. He made five appearances without scoring, before joining Sheffield United on loan until the end of the 2010–11 season, teaming up with Micky Adams at a third different club. With the Blades in free-fall Bent made ten appearances, mainly from the bench, before returning early to Birmingham in mid-April having failed to score a goal. Birmingham decided against taking up the option of another season, and Bent was released when his contract expired at the end of the 2010–11 season.

=== Mitra Kukar ===
Bent signed a one-year contract with Indonesia Super League club Mitra Kukar on 3 November 2011. In doing so he rejected interest from clubs in England, choosing the Far East as he "didn't want to be based up north". He was released on 17 April 2012, with the club in mid-table.

=== Non-league football ===
On 13 September 2017, now aged 39, Bent signed a one-year contract with Southern Combination League Premier Division club Wick; club chairman Rodney Lampton said he and Bent had been childhood friends. However, Bent left the club without making an appearance. On 3 January 2020, he joined Eastern Counties League First Division North club Cornard United.

== International career ==
Bent represented his England at under-21 level in May 1998, in games against South Africa and Argentina.

== Personal life ==
Bent was born in Hammersmith, London, to parents of Jamaican origin. Before signing a scholarship with Brentford in 1994, he was named Marcus Lecky. He has a younger brother, Elliott, who is ten years his junior and is also a footballer. Elliott was a youth team player at Fulham, until injury saw him released in 2007. He dropped into non-League football and has played for Dorchester Town, Welling United and Hampton & Richmond Borough.

Bent had been engaged to Kelly Clark, with whom he has a daughter, but their relationship ended, and they split up. He has since been involved with model Danielle Lloyd and actress Gemma Atkinson, to whom he was briefly engaged. After his playing career ended, Bent entered the oil business. However, he left the industry and his life went into a steep decline as he struggled with mental health problems, using drugs to self medicate.

He was charged with affray and possession of a Class A drug in September 2015 after police used a taser whilst arresting him at his home in Esher, Surrey. He had called 999 after believing intruders were in his house, but was tasered by police responding to the call. In February 2016 he admitted to one charge of affray and possession of cocaine; he was given a suspended 12-month prison sentence, a two-month curfew and 200 hours of compulsory unpaid work. Four months later he was fined £385 with £85 costs after being found with cocaine at Chessington World of Adventures. He was declared bankrupt in January 2019.

== Career statistics ==
Appearances and goals by club, season and competition
Club	Season	League			FA Cup		League Cup		Other		Total	
Club	Season	Division	Apps	Goals	Apps	Goals	Apps	Goals	Apps	Goals	Apps	Goals
Brentford	1995–96	Second Division	12	1	4	3	0	0	1 (Note: Appearance in Football League Trophy)	0	17	4
Brentford	1996–97	Second Division	34	3	2	0	4	0	5 (Note: Three appearances and one goal in Second Division play-offs, two appearances in Football League Trophy)	1	45	4
Brentford	1997–98	Second Division	24	4	2	0	3	1	0	0	29	5
Brentford	Total		70	8	8	3	7	1	6	1	91	13
Crystal Palace	1997–98	Premier League	16	5	0	0	0	0	―		16	5
Crystal Palace	1998–99	First Division	12	0	1	0	2	0	―		15	0
Crystal Palace	Total		28	5	1	0	2	0	―		31	5
Port Vale	1998–99	First Division	15	0	0	0	0	0	―		15	0
Port Vale	1999–2000	First Division	8	1	0	0	1	0	―		9	1
Port Vale	Total		23	1	0	0	1	0	―		24	1
Sheffield United	1999–2000	First Division	32	15	3	1	0	0	―		35	16
Sheffield United	2000–01	First Division	16	5	0	0	5	3	―		21	8
Sheffield United	Total		48	20	3	1	5	3	―		56	24
Blackburn Rovers	2000–01	First Division	28	8	6	3	0	0	―		34	11
Blackburn Rovers	2001–02	Premier League	9	0	0	0	1	0	―		10	0
Blackburn Rovers	Total		37	8	6	3	1	0	―		44	11
Ipswich Town	2001–02	Premier League	25	9	2	1	0	0	0	0	27	10
Ipswich Town	2002–03	First Division	32	11	2	0	1	0	3 (Note: Appearances in UEFA Cup)	1	38	12
Ipswich Town	2003–04	First Division	4	1	0	0	1	0	0	0	5	1
Ipswich Town	Total		61	21	4	1	2	0	3	1	70	23
Leicester City (loan)	2003–04	Premier League	33	9	2	1	0	0	0	0	35	10
Everton	2004–05	Premier League	37	6	3	0	2	1	―		42	7
Everton	2005–06	Premier League	18	1	1	0	1	0	4 (Note: Two appearances in UEFA Champions League, two appearances in UEFA Cup)	0	24	1
Everton	Total		55	7	4	0	3	1	4	0	66	8
Charlton Athletic	2005–06	Premier League	13	2	0	0	0	0	―		13	2
Charlton Athletic	2006–07	Premier League	30	1	1	0	4	1	―		35	2
Charlton Athletic	2007–08	Championship	3	1	0	0	1	0	―		4	1
Charlton Athletic	Total		46	4	1	0	5	1	―		52	5
Wigan Athletic (loan)	2007–08	Premier League	31	7	1	0	0	0	0	0	32	7
Birmingham City	2008–09	Championship	33	3	1	0	1	0	0	0	35	3
Middlesbrough (loan)	2009–10	Championship	7	0	1	0	0	0	0	0	8	0
Queens Park Rangers (loan)	2009–10	Championship	3	0	0	0	0	0	0	0	3	0
Wolverhampton Wanderers (loan)	2010–11	Premier League	3	0	0	0	2	0	0	0	5	0
Sheffield United (loan)	2010–11	Championship	11	0	0	0	0	0	0	0	11	0
Mitra Kukar	2011–12	Indonesia Super League	11	4	―		―		―		11	4
Wick	2017–18	Southern Combination; Premier Division	0	0	0	0	―		0	0	0	0
Cornard United	2019–20	Eastern Counties League; Division One North	1	0	―		―		―		1	0
Career total			501	97	32	9	29	6	13	2	575	114

== Honours ==
Blackburn Rovers

- Football League First Division second-place promotion: 2000–01

Birmingham City

- Football League Championship second-place promotion: 2008–09

Individual

- Premier League Player of the Month: January 2002
