= Alan Woodward =

English footballer (1946–2015)

Personal information
- Date of birth: 7 September 1946
- Place of birth: Chapeltown, Sheffield, England
- Date of death: 21 May 2015 (aged 68)
- Place of death: Tulsa, Oklahoma, United States
- Position: Winger

Youth career
- Barnsley Boys, England Youth

Senior career*
Years	Team	Apps	(Gls)
1964–1978	Sheffield United	538	(158)
1979–1981	Tulsa Roughnecks	47	(12)
1979–1980	Tulsa Roughnecks (indoor)	23	(31)
Total		608	(201)
- * Club domestic league appearances and goals

Alan Woodward (7 September 1946 – 21 May 2015) was a professional footballer who played in the position of outside right for Sheffield United over a 16-year period between 1962 and 1978.

Woodward or Woody as he was nicknamed, will be best remembered for his powerful shots. He was also a dead-ball specialist, especially effective with corners, and scored directly from them on many occasions. Wearing the No.7 shirt; he possessed pace, power, and skill and was a local lad who, it is often said, missed out on international recognition because of his temperament. He played in the Sheffield United goal to cover for injuries.

His first appearances for Sheffield United came in their two County Cup (a regional competition for teams in South Yorkshire) fixtures of season 1963–64, against Rotherham United in the semi-final and Barnsley in the final. The County Cup competition was won by United 4–3 with Woodward scoring the first goal of the game and the first of his first team career.

His League debut came against Liverpool at Anfield on 7 October 1964 and his first goal came on 31 October against Leeds United at Elland Road. He scored 4 goals (including a penalty) in a 7–0 home victory against Ipswich Town on 27 November 1971. He left United at the start of season 1978–79, his final goal being a penalty against River Plate of Argentina, in order to play for the Tulsa Roughnecks, where he was nicknamed "the Boomer" for his strong, high arching and accurate passes and shots on goal, in the North American Soccer League.

He remains the Blades' leading post-war scorer and made a total of 538 league appearances for United.

After retirement Woodward remained in Oklahoma for the rest of his life. In 1984, he established the competitive youth soccer club, Tulsa Sheffield United FC. Throughout his long career whether playing, coaching, training, and volunteering he made a huge impact on youth soccer in Oklahoma. He also worked for American Airlines, retiring in 2009 after a 20 year career. He died on 21 May 2015 at his home in Tulsa, Oklahoma.

== Career statistics ==
Appearances and goals by club, season and competition
Club	Season	League			National cup		League cup		Other		Total	
Club	Season	Division	Apps	Goals	Apps	Goals	Apps	Goals	Apps	Goals	Apps	Goals
Sheffield United	1963–64	First Division	0	0	0	0	0	0	2 (Note: Appearance(s) in Sheffield & Hallamshire County Cup)	1	2	1
Sheffield United	1964–65	First Division	27	7	3	1	0	0	1	0	31	8
Sheffield United	1965–66	First Division	23	3	2	1	0	0	1	1	26	5
Sheffield United	1966–67	First Division	41	11	4	0	5	3	3	1	53	15
Sheffield United	1967–68	First Division	33	6	3	1	1	0	1	1	38	8
Sheffield United	1968–69	Second Division	42	12	1	0	1	0	3	0	47	12
Sheffield United	1969–70	Second Division	42	18	2	0	3	3	2	1	49	22
Sheffield United	1970–71	Second Division	42	15	1	0	2	0	4 (Note: Two appearances one goal in Sheffield & Hallamshire County Cup; two appearances two goals in Watney Cup)	3	49	18
Sheffield United	1971–72	First Division	40	15	1	0	5	5	—		46	20
Sheffield United	1972–73	First Division	39	10	1	0	5	1	4 (Note: Three appearances two goals in Watney Cup; one appearance in Texaco Cup)	2	49	13
Sheffield United	1973–74	First Division	42	17	1	0	1	1	4 (Note: Two appearances in Sheffield & Hallamshire County Cup; two appearances in Texaco Cup)	0	48	18
Sheffield United	1974–75	First Division	42	12	2	0	4	1	3 (Note: Appearance(s) in Texaco Cup)	2	51	15
Sheffield United	1975–76	First Division	41	10	1	0	2	0	7 (Note: Four appearances three goals in Sheffield & Hallamshire County Cup; three appearances two goals in Anglo-Scottish Cup)	5	51	15
Sheffield United	1976–77	Second Division	40	10	2	0	1	0	5 (Note: Two appearances in Sheffield & Hallamshire County Cup; three appearances in Anglo-Scottish Cup)	0	48	10
Sheffield United	1977–78	Second Division	39	12	1	0	1	0	4 (Note: One appearance in Sheffield & Hallamshire County Cup; three appearances in Anglo-Scottish Cup)	0	45	12
Sheffield United	1978–79	Second Division	5	0	0	0	1	0	3 (Note: Appearance(s) in Anglo-Scottish Cup)	0	9	0
Career total			538	158	25	3	32	14	47	17	642	192
