= Harold Brook =

English footballer

Personal information
- Date of birth: 15 October 1921
- Place of birth: Sheffield, England
- Date of death: 1998 (aged 76–77)
- Place of death: Sheffield, England
- Position: Forward

Youth career
- Woodbourn Alliance
- 1938–1939: Fulwood
- 1939: Hallam

Senior career*
Years	Team	Apps	(Gls)
1939–1954	Sheffield United	229	(89)
1954–1958	Leeds United	102	(46)
1958	Lincoln City	4	(1)
Total		335	(136)
- * Club domestic league appearances and goals

Harold Brook (15 October 1921 in Sheffield, England – 1998) was a footballer who played as an inside forward for Sheffield United and Leeds United in the 1940s and 1950s.
