= Walter Hobson =

English footballer

Personal information
- Place of birth: England
- Position: Centre half

Senior career*
| Years | Team | Apps | (Gls) |
- The Wednesday
| 1889–1891 | Owlerton | | |
| 1889–1890 | Sheffield United | 0 | (0) |
| 1890–1893 | Owlerton | | |
| 1893–1895 | Rotherham Town | 20 | (0) |
- * Club domestic league appearances and goals

Walter Hobson was an English footballer who played as a centre-half for Owlerton, Sheffield United, The Wednesday and Rotherham Town.

== Playing career ==
Hobson was amongst the first players to sign for the newly formed Sheffield United after responding to adverts placed in the local press. Having started his career at local rivals The Wednesday he was signed in August 1889 from another local side Owlerton, where he had been club captain. He was a regular in The Blades' first season which was primarily made up of friendly fixtures but he also played seven games in the FA Cup.

Leaving United only one year after signing Hobson returned to Owlerton until moving to Rotherham Town where he made his Football League debut in 1893, despite nearing the end of his career.
