= Arthur Brown (footballer, born 1885) =

English footballer

Personal information
- Full name: Arthur Samuel Brown
- Date of birth: 6 April 1885
- Place of birth: Gainsborough, England
- Date of death: 27 June 1944 (aged 59)
- Position: Forward

Senior career*
Years	Team	Apps	(Gls)
1901–1902	Gainsborough Trinity	3	(2)
1902–1908	Sheffield United	178	(95)
1908–1910	Sunderland	50	(21)
1910–1912	Fulham	41	(9)
1912	Middlesbrough	4	(0)
Total		276	(127)

International career
1904–1906	England	2	(1)
- * Club domestic league appearances and goals

Arthur Samuel Brown (6 April 1885 – 27 June 1944) was an English international footballer who played as a forward.

== Club career ==
Brown played in the Football League for Gainsborough Trinity, Sheffield United, Sunderland, Fulham and Middlesbrough.

== International career ==
Brown was capped on two occasions by the England national football team. He made hs debut during the 2–2 draw against Wales on 29 February 1904 at the age of 18 years, 10 months, 23 days.

== Career statistics ==
=== International ===
Appearances and goals by national team and year
National team	Year	Apps	Goals
England	1904	1	0
England	1905	0	0
England	1906	1	1
Total		2	1

Scores and results list England's goal tally first, score column indicates score after each Brown goal.

List of international goals scored by Arthur Brown
No.	Date	Venue	Cap	Opponent	Score	Result	Competition
1.	17 February 1906	Solitude, Belfast, Ireland	2	Northern Ireland	2–0	5–0	Friendly
