= Billy Madin =

English footballer

Personal information
- Full name: William Madin
- Place of birth: Sheffield, England
- Position: Forward

Senior career*
| Years | Team | Apps | (Gls) |
- Eckington
| 1887–1889 | Staveley | | |
| 1889–1890 | Sheffield United | 0 | (0) |
| 1890–1892 | Staveley | | |
| 1892–1893 | Eckington | | |
- * Club domestic league appearances and goals

William Madin was an English footballer who played for Sheffield United as a forward Signed in 1889 from Staveley he had answered United's advert in the local press asking for players to form a club, although he stayed with the Bramall Lane side for just their inaugural season which consisted mainly of friendly fixtures. Madin played three games for the Blades in the FA Cup, including their heaviest ever defeat; a 13–0 loss to Bolton Wanderers in February 1890. Madin left Bramall Lane not long after and returned to his former club Stavely before finishing his career with Eckington.
