= L. Gilmartin =

Scottish footballer

Personal information
- Place of birth: Scotland
- Position: Fullback

Senior career*
Years	Team	Apps	(Gls)
1889–1890	Sheffield United	0	(0)
- * Club domestic league appearances and goals

L. Gilmartin was a Scottish footballer who played as a fullback for Sheffield United in their inaugural season in 1889 to 1890.

Born in Scotland, Gilmartin was one of a number of Scots who travelled South to join the newly formed Yorkshire club after United had advertised for players in the Scottish press. He played regularly during his one season at Bramall Lane, making 41 appearances although the majority of these were friendly games. He also played in all of the games that made up United's first FA Cup campaign, including the record 13–0 loss to Bolton Wanderers.

With United looking to sign a better standard of player in order to compete in League football Gilmartin was released in the summer of 1890.
