= Donald Fraser (Scottish footballer) =

Scottish footballer

Personal information
- Place of birth: Scotland
- Position: Half back

Senior career*
Years	Team	Apps	(Gls)
1889–1890	Sheffield United	0	(0)
- * Club domestic league appearances and goals

Donald Fraser was a Scottish footballer who played for Sheffield United as a half back Signed in 1889 he had answered United's advert in the Scottish press asking for players to form a club, although he stayed with the Bramall Lane side for just their inaugural season which consisted mainly of friendly fixtures. Known as 'the little Scotsman' he played five games for the Blades in the FA Cup and scored in their first ever Cup game against Scarborough in September 1889.
