= James Duncan (football outside left) =

Scottish footballer

Personal information
- Place of birth: Scotland
- Position: Outside left

Youth career
- 1889: Strathmore

Senior career*
| Years | Team | Apps | (Gls) |
| 1889–1890 | Sheffield United | 0 | (0) |
| 1891–1893 | Sheffield United | 2 | (1) |
- * Club domestic league appearances and goals

James Duncan was a Scottish footballer who played for Sheffield United as an outside left Signed in 1889, he had answered United's advert in the Scottish press asking for players to form a club, playing regularly for the Bramall Lane side for their inaugural season which consisted mainly of friendly fixtures.

At the end of the first season it was suggested that he had returned to Scotland along with several of his team-mates. In December 1891 however he began to feature for The Blades once more, playing a number of games between then and the end of that season, although only making two league appearances. During the following summer the local press reported that he had again returned North of the border but the club continued to list him as a player, retaining his registration for another year, despite him making no further appearances.
