= Colin Collindridge =

English footballer (1920–2019)

Personal information
- Full name: Colin Collindridge
- Date of birth: 15 November 1920
- Place of birth: Barnsley, England
- Date of death: 14 April 2019 (aged 98)
- Height: 5 ft 10 1/2 in (1.79 m)
- Position: Forward

Youth career
- Barugh Green

Senior career*
Years	Team	Apps	(Gls)
1936–1937	Wombwell Main		
1937–1938	Rotherham United		
1938	Barugh Green		
1938–1950	Sheffield United	142	(52)
1940–1941	→ Chesterfield (guest)		
1942–1945	→ Notts County (guest)		
1944–1945	→ Lincoln City (guest)		
1945–1946	→ Oldham Athletic (guest)		
1950–1954	Nottingham Forest	151	(45)
1954–1956	Coventry City	34	(6)
1956–1957	Bath City		
1957–1958	Arnold St Mary's		
Total		327	(103)
- * Club domestic league appearances and goals

Colin Collindridge (15 November 1920 – 14 April 2019) was an English footballer who played either as an outside left or a centre forward. Born in Barnsley, the early part of his playing career coincided with World War II but he subsequently represented Sheffield United, Nottingham Forest and Coventry City in the Football League.

== Career ==
Collindridge was working as a miner and playing as an amateur for local side Wombwell Main when he was offered a trial with Wolverhampton Wanderers in 1937. Having failed to secure a contract with Wolves, Collindridge signed an amateur contract with Rotherham United the following summer, remaining with the Millers for a season before turning out for Barugh Green, his home-town side in 1938. It was here that Collindridge was spotted by Sheffield United, who signed him on amateur terms in December 1938, and professionally a month later in January 1939.

Collindridge was initially utilised in the reserves and did not make his first team debut until October 1939, by which time World War II had commenced and competitive football in England had been abandoned. Playing regularly for United in the wartime leagues, Collindridge also represented Chesterfield, Notts County, Lincoln City and Oldham Athletic as a guest player during the war. By the end of the war Collindridge was established as a first team choice for Sheffield United and he finally made his Football League debut in August 1946 in a 1–0 home loss to Liverpool. Initially deployed as an outside left Collindridge was increasingly asked to play as a centre forward during this period, despite it not being his preference.

In 1950 Collindridge rejected a move to Preston North End but did eventually sign for Nottingham Forest for £12,500 in August 1950. Winning a Third Division South championship medal in 1950–51, Collindridge remained with Forest for four years before joining Coventry City on a free transfer in June 1954. After a further two seasons with City, and with his career winding down, Collindridge joined non-league Bath City in 1956 before finishing his career with Arnold St Mary's.

== Personal life ==
Born in the Barugh Green area of Barnsley, Collindridge worked as a miner in Wombwell Main Colliery during his early playing days and continued this role during the early years of the Second World War. In 1941 however, Collindridge enlisted in the RAF and was employed as an armourer for the remainder of the conflict. After the end of his playing career Collindridge was involved in the catering trade before retiring to Newark-on-Trent.
