= S. Mack =

English footballer

Personal information
- Position: Defender

Senior career*
| Years | Team | Apps | (Gls) |
| 1887–1888 | Notts Rangers | | |
| 1888–1889 | Gainsborough Trinity | | |
| 1889–1890 | Sheffield United | 0 | (0) |
| 1890–1893 | Crewe Alexandra | 3 | (0) |
- * Club domestic league appearances and goals

S. Mack was an English footballer who played as a defender.

Having played for Notts Rangers and Gainsborough Trinity, Mack who was described as 'a rare good half back' was signed by newly formed Sheffield United in the summer of 1889 to play in their first ever season. He made 57 appearances for the Yorkshire club in his one-season, including seven in their inaugural FA Cup campaign but moved on to Crewe Alexandra in the following close season.

Whilst at Crewe Mack made his Football League debut but his first team career seems to have ended soon after.
