= T. B. A. Clarke =

English footballer

Personal information
- Full name: Thomas Bishop Andrews Clarke
- Date of birth: 5 October 1868
- Place of birth: Wentworth, West Riding of Yorkshire
- Date of death: 9 January 1909 (aged 40)
- Place of death: Wortley, Yorkshire
- Position: Striker

Senior career*
| Years | Team | Apps | (Gls) |
- Wentworth
| 1889–1890 | Sheffield United | 3 | (0) |
| 1890–? | Sheffield Club | | |
- * Club domestic league appearances and goals

Thomas Bishop Andrews Clarke (5 October 1868 – 9 January 1909) was an English footballer who played as a striker for Sheffield United and represented the Sheffield FA against Glasgow in 1890.

== Playing career ==
Clarke was an amateur player when he signed for Sheffield United midway through their first season of existence. He played occasionally for the club, possibly contracted on a part-time basis, for just over a year and captained the side on a number of occasions. Although the bulk of his appearances were in friendly fixtures Clarke did appear for the Blades in two FA Cup fixtures and a handful of games in the Midland Counties League.

Moving on to play for Sheffield Club in December 1890, Clarke remained part of Sheffield United, serving as a committee member during the 1891–92 season.

== Personal life ==
Clarke was born in Wentworth, Yorkshire, where he played 1889–90. He was the second son of Dr. William Clarke and Euphemia Baird Jamieson Andrews. His father was family physician to the Fitzwilliams at Wentworth Woodhouse. He was educated at Harrow, where he played football and cricket, and earned his B.A. from Trinity College, Cambridge in 1890. He worked as an electrical engineer, training with the General Electric Power and Traction Co. Ltd.

Prior to his death in 1909, Clarke and his brother held a patent for an electric coal cutter.
