= Billy Mosforth =

English footballer

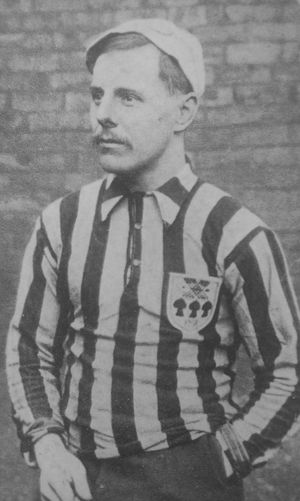
- Billy Mosforth in his United kit

Personal information
- Full name: William Mosforth
- Date of birth: 2 January 1858
- Place of birth: Sheffield, England
- Date of death: 11 July 1929 (aged 71)
- Place of death: Sheffield, England
- Positions: Inside left; outside left

Senior career*
Years	Team	Apps	(Gls)
1873–1879	Sheffield Albion		
1878–1888	The Wednesday		
1879	→ The Zulus	1	(0)
1875–1884	→ Hallam		
1883	→ Sheffield Rovers		
1884–1886	→ Heeley		
1886–1889	→ Lockwood Brothers		
1889–1890	Sheffield United	0	(0)

International career
1877–1882	England	9	(3)
- * Club domestic league appearances and goals

William Mosforth (2 January 1858 – 11 July 1929) was an English footballer who played either as an inside or outside left. Born in Sheffield he played for several Sheffield clubs but the majority of his career was spent at The Wednesday. He later joined Sheffield United, playing in their first season in existence before retiring in 1890. He won nine caps for England between 1877 and 1882, which was a record at the time, scoring three goals for his country.

== Club career ==
Playing in his home town of Sheffield for his entire career Mosforth was known as the 'Little Wonder' or 'The Sheffield Dodger' due to his small stature. He was often considered the best local player during his era with outstanding ball control, crossing ability and long dribbles, sometimes taking it the entire length of the pitch! He was also a leading exponent of the "screw shot" that allowed him to bend the ball in the air, a technique that was developed in Sheffield at the time and is now commonplace in the game.

Mosforth began his career at Sheffield Albion and made his debut at 14 but was famous for swapping sides and profiteering from his play. As an amateur player he was allowed to play for more than one club under FA rules at that time, although like many players Mosforth probably received some sort of payment for his services. One anecdotal story says that when he ran onto the pitch in Hallam colours someone in the crowd shouted "10 bob and free drinks, Billy, if you'll change your shirt". He promptly ran back to the dressing room and returned in a Sheffield Wednesday shirt. Despite this he was selected to play for the Sheffield Football Association in 1876 at the age of 18.

Signing for The Wednesday in 1878 Mosforth would remain with the club for almost a decade, scoring their first ever goal at their Olive Grove ground, but continued to play for a number of other local teams during that period. In 1879 he played for The Zulus a touring side created to aid families of casualties of the Zulu War. The side became embroiled in controversy when it was revealed that the players were to make money themselves (a practice illegal at the time). Like many of the Wednesday players who were involved in the Zulu team, Mosforth was also one of the players who pushed them into becoming professional team. He played for the break-away team (Sheffield Rovers) that intended to become Sheffield's first professional side, but he returned to the Wednesday fold after professionalism was agreed upon.

After leaving The Wednesday he was amongst the first players to answer the advertisement asking for players to form the new Sheffield United team that were placed in the local press. He duly signed for the new club and remained at Bramall Lane for one season (prior to their entry into The Football League), having the distinction of scoring United's first ever goal at the ground and of being one of the first players to play for both leading sides in the city. Mosforth was also the first Blades player to be 'substituted' during a match (before substitutes were permitted) when a teammate was late arriving for a game against Bolton Wanderers, coincidentally the first game to be played under floodlights, meaning that Mosforth was asked to fill in until his teammate arrived.

== International career ==
Mosforth made his debut for England in March 1877, appearing in a friendly against Scotland. He went on to play nine times for his country and scored three goals.

=== International goals ===
#	Date	Venue	Opponent	Result	Competition	Scored
1	5 April 1879	Kennington Oval, London	Scotland	5–4	Friendly	1
2	13 March 1880	Hampden Park, Glasgow	Scotland	4–5	Friendly	1
3	13 March 1882	Racecourse Ground, Wrexham	Wales	5–3	Friendly	1

== Records ==
Billy Mosforth holds a number of records in the game, these are as follows:

First player to play for both Sheffield Wednesday and Sheffield United.

First player to score for both Sheffield Wednesday and Sheffield United.

Scored the first goal at Sheffield United's ground Bramall Lane.

First Sheffield United player to be 'substituted'.

Record England Cap holder at the time.

Played in the first professional game to be played under floodlights.

Scored Sheffield Wednesday's first ever goal at the Olive Grove

== Personal life ==
Mosforth was an engraver by trade and was an all round athlete, competing in both flat and hurdle races and playing for Hallam Cricket Club. After he retired from playing Mosforth became a licensee in Sheffield.
