= Dugald Galbraith =

Scottish footballer

Personal information
- Place of birth: Scotland
- Positions: Inside right; inside left

Senior career*
Years	Team	Apps	(Gls)
1889–1890	Sheffield United	0	(0)
- * Club domestic league appearances and goals

Dugald Galbraith was a Scottish footballer who played for Sheffield United. Signed in 1889 having played local football in Dundee he stayed with the Bramall Lane club for just their inaugural season which consisted mainly of friendly fixtures. He played seven games for the Blades in the FA Cup and scored the team's first ever FA Cup goal against Scarborough in September 1889.
