= Sheffield & Hallamshire County Cup =

- Founded: 1920
- Abolished: 1998
- Most championships: Sheffield United (21 titles; plus 2 shared)

The Sheffield & Hallamshire County Cup was a county cup competition involving the professional sides within the Sheffield and Hallamshire County Football Association. It ran from 1920/21 to the mid-1990s, with several gaps between tournaments.

Eligible teams were - Barnsley, Doncaster Rovers, Rotherham County (until 1925), Rotherham United (from 1925), Sheffield United, Sheffield Wednesday.

== Finals ==
Season	Winner	Score	Runner-up	Venue	Notes
1920–21	Sheffield United	2 – 1	Sheffield Wednesday	Hillsborough	
1921–22	Barnsley	2 – 1	Sheffield Wednesday	Oakwell	
1922–23	Rotherham County	2 – 1	Barnsley	Hillsborough	
1923–24	Sheffield United	2 – 0	Sheffield Wednesday	Hillsborough	
1924–25	Barnsley	1 – 0	Rotherham County	Hillsborough	
1925–26	Sheffield United	3 – 1	Sheffield Wednesday	Bramall Lane	
1926–27	Sheffield Wednesday	4 – 1	Barnsley	Hillsborough	
1927–28	Sheffield Wednesday	5 – 2	Rotherham United	Hillsborough	
1928–29	Sheffield Wednesday	2 – 0	Sheffield United	Bramall Lane	
1929–30	Sheffield United	3 – 1	Sheffield Wednesday	Bramall Lane	
1930–31	Sheffield United	9 – 2	Barnsley	Bramall Lane	
1931–32	Sheffield Wednesday	3 – 0	Barnsley	Hillsborough	
1932–33	Sheffield United	4 – 2	Sheffield Wednesday	Bramall Lane	
1933–34	Sheffield Wednesday	3 – 0	Doncaster Rovers	Hillsborough	
1934–35	Barnsley	1 – 0	Rotherham United	Oakwell	
1935–36	Doncaster Rovers	2 – 1	Sheffield United	Belle Vue	
1936–37	Barnsley	3 – 2	Sheffield United	Oakwell	
1937–38	Doncaster Rovers	1 – 0	Barnsley	Belle Vue	
1938–39		0 – 0		Bramall Lane	Cup shared between Sheffield Wednesday and Sheffield United
1939–40					Suspended due to outbreak of World War II
1940–41	Doncaster Rovers	3 – 2	Rotherham United	Belle Vue	
1941–42	Barnsley	8 – 3 (agg)	Rotherham United	n/a	
1942–43	Barnsley	10 – 6 (agg)	Rotherham United	n/a	
1943–44	Rotherham United	4 – 2 (agg)	Sheffield United	n/a	All games doubled up as Football League North games
1944–45	Sheffield Wednesday	7 – 3 (agg)	Sheffield United	n/a	All games doubled up as Football League North games
1945–46	Sheffield Wednesday	2 – 1 (agg)	Barnsley	n/a	
1946–47	Barnsley	3 – 1	Rotherham United	Millmoor	
1947–48	Barnsley	3 – 1	Sheffield Wednesday	Hillsborough	
1948–49	Barnsley	1 – 0	Sheffield United	Oakwell	
1949–50	Sheffield Wednesday	1 – 0	Sheffield United	Hillsborough	
1950–51	Sheffield Wednesday	2 – 1	Doncaster Rovers	Hillsborough	
1951–52	Sheffield United	3 – 1	Rotherham United	Millmoor	
1952–53	Sheffield United	5 – 0	Rotherham United	Bramall Lane	
1953–54	Sheffield United	4 – 2	Rotherham United	Millmoor	
1954–55	Rotherham United	4 – 2	Sheffield Wednesday	Hillsborough	
1955–56	Doncaster Rovers	4 – 0	Sheffield United	Belle Vue	
1956–57	Sheffield United	3 – 1	Rotherham United	Millmoor	
1957–58	Sheffield United	3 – 0	Sheffield Wednesday	Hillsborough	
1958–59	Sheffield United	4 – 1	Sheffield Wednesday	Hillsborough	
1959–60	Sheffield United	2 – 1	Rotherham United	Bramall Lane	
1960–61					Not completed
1961–62					Not completed
1962–63					Not played
1963–64	Sheffield United	4 – 3	Barnsley	Oakwell	
1964–65	Sheffield United	4 – 0	Doncaster Rovers	Belle Vue	
1965–66	Rotherham United	1 – 0	Sheffield United	Millmoor	
1966–67	Sheffield United	3 – 2	Barnsley	Oakwell	Replayed; First game 1 – 1 at Oakwell
1967–68	Doncaster Rovers	1 – 0	Barnsley	Belle Vue	
1968–69	Sheffield United	2 – 0	Doncaster Rovers	Bramall Lane	Replayed; First game 0 – 0 at Belle Vue
1969–70	Rotherham United	1 – 0	Rotherham United	Millmoor	
1970–71					No completed, cup shared between Barnsley and Sheffield United
1971–72					Not played
1972–73	Sheffield Wednesday	0 – 0	Sheffield United	Hillsborough	Sheffield Wednesday won 4 – 3 on penalties
1973–74	Sheffield United	0 – 0	Rotherham United	Bramall Lane	Sheffield United won 4 – 2 on penalties
1974–75	Sheffield Wednesday	2 – 1	Sheffield United	Bramall Lane	
1975–76	Doncaster Rovers	2 – 1	Sheffield United	Bramall Lane	
1976–77	Rotherham United	1 – 0	Sheffield United	Bramall Lane	
1977–78	Sheffield United	4 – 1	Doncaster Rovers	Bramall Lane	
1978–79					Not completed
1979–80	Sheffield United	2 – 1	Sheffield Wednesday	Hillsborough	
1980–81	Rotherham United	2 – 1	Sheffield Wednesday	Millmoor	
1981–82	Sheffield United	3 – 2	Sheffield Wednesday	Bramall Lane	
1982–83					Not played
1983–84					Not played
1984–85					Not played
1985–86	Doncaster Rovers	1 – 0	Rotherham United	Belle Vue	
1986–87	Rotherham United	1 – 0	Doncaster Rovers	Belle Vue	
1987–88					Not played
1988–89					Not played
1989–90					Not played
1990–91					Not played
1991–92					Not played
1992–93	Barnsley	3 – 2	Doncaster Rovers	Oakwell	
1993–94					Not played
1994–95					Not played
1994–95					Not played
1995–96					Not played
1996–97					Not played
1997–98					Not played

=== Winners ===
- 21 wins - Sheffield United (plus 2 shared titles)
- 11 wins - Sheffield Wednesday (plus 1 shared title)
- 10 wins - Barnsley (plus 1 shared title)
- 7 wins - Doncaster Rovers, Rotherham United
- 1 win - Rotherham County

== See also ==
- Sheffield & Hallamshire Senior Cup
- Wharncliffe Charity Cup
- Sheffield & Hallamshire County Senior League
